= Social and Economic Council =

Dutch economic advisory body

The Social and Economic Council (Dutch: Sociaal-Economische Raad, SER) is a major economic advisory council to the cabinet of the Netherlands. Formally it heads a system of sector-based regulatory organisations. It represents the social partners trade unions and employers' organisations. It forms the core organisation of the corporatist and social market economy known as the polder model and the main platform for social dialogue.

== History ==
The SER was founded in 1950. It was founded after a long debate about the economic order of the Netherlands. The two main governing parties of the time, the Catholic People's Party (KVP) and the Labour Party (PvdA) had differing opinions on the subject. Both wanted to prevent the repetition of the Great Depression. The Labour Party preferred to grant the government an important regulatory role in the economy, while the KVP preferred to rely on the workings of a self-regulating market economy. A compromise was found in the corporatist model, in which both trade unions and employers' organisations would form sector-based regulatory organisations. The SER headed this structure and served as important partner for the national government. The SER was very important in the reconstruction of the Netherlands after the World War II.

In the 1950s and 60s, the SER was particularly successful in ensuring economic growth through close cooperation between government, trade unions and employers' organisations. In the 1970s, because of rising political polarisation and the 1973 oil crisis, the SER was unable to resolve economic problems. In the 1980s the SER returned to the centre of the economic policy making, as it was the platform for dialogue between the government and its social partners. In the 1990s, the role of the SER began to change. The role of the sector-based regulatory organisations began to decline and the SER increasingly took the role of an advisory council of government; in 1997 the Senate and House of Representatives were granted the right to submit enquiry commissions to the SER.

== Goals ==
The SER has three main goals for Dutch social-economic policy:

- To promote balanced and sustainable economic growth;
- To promote full employment;
- To promote a fair income distribution.

== Organisation ==
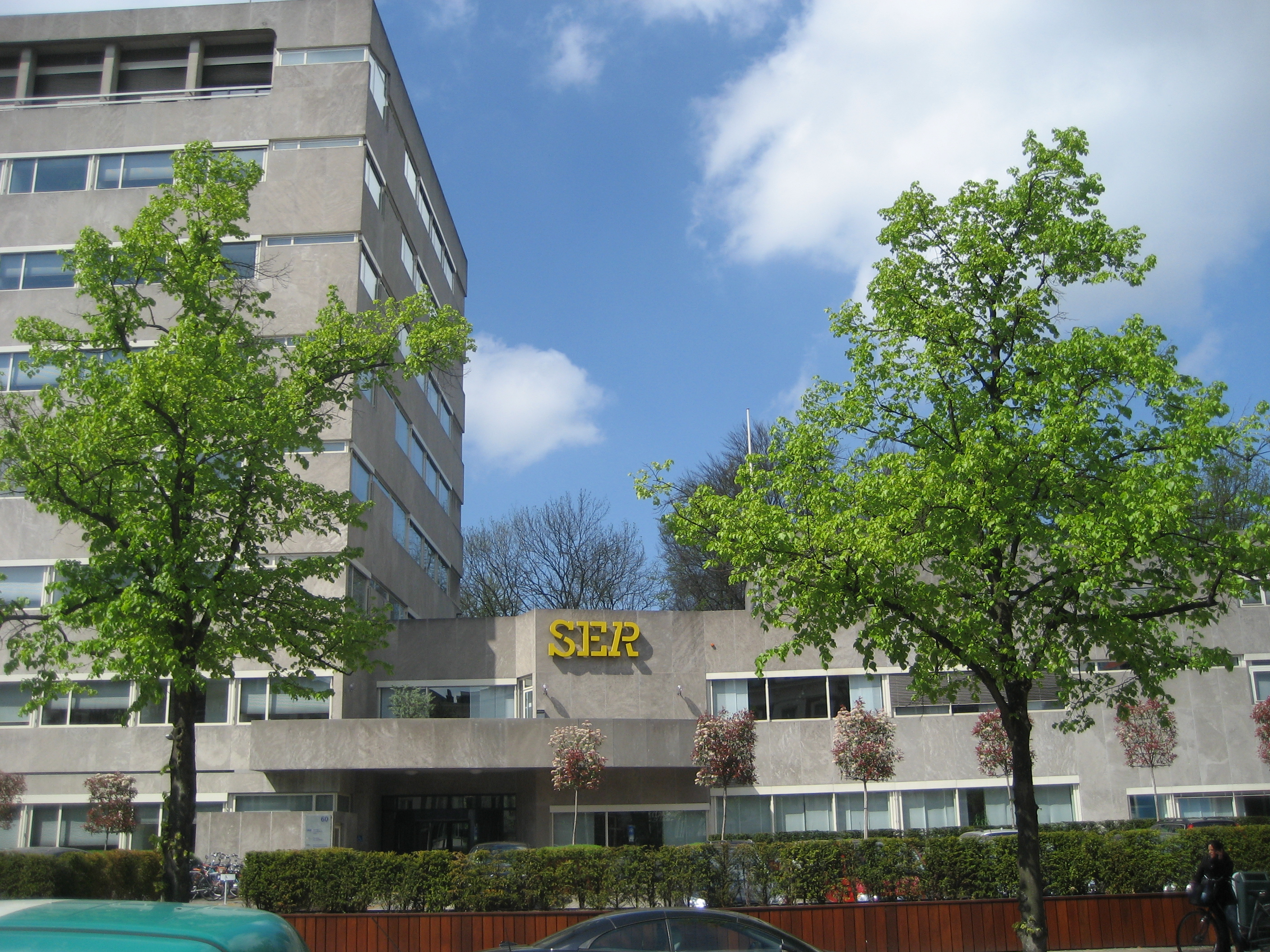
SER headquarters, The Hague

The SER has thirty-three members. It consists of three sections, which each have eleven members in the council. These sections are trade unions, employers' organisations and government-appointed members, the so-called Crown members. The trade union members are appointed from the three major unions: FNV (8), CNV (2) and the MHP (1). The members of the employers' organisations are representatives from the three major employers' organisations: VNO-NCW (7), MKB (3) and the LTO (1). The government-appointed members are normally professors of economics or related fields and they include representatives of the Bureau for Economic Policy Analysis (CPB) and the central bank, De Nederlandsche Bank. The board of the SER is formed by four members of each section. The chair of the organisation is always a government appointee.

The SER heads and oversees the system of sector-based regulatory organisations. These organisations can like other governments, provinces, water boards etc. enforce legislation for their members, in this case companies. The SER is financed by levies which companies pay to the chambers of commerce. It spends €14 million a year.

== Activities ==
The group has negotiated among other things, agreements in the textile sector, the banking sector and the gold sector. The SER also performs legal and administrative tasks. For example in the field of employee participation, healthy and safe working, employment inspections and pensions.

== List of chairs of the Social and Economic Council ==
Portrait	Name	Term of office	Previous experience	Party
Frans de Vries	Dr. Frans de Vries (1884–1958)	1 June 1950 – 15 June 1958 (8 years, 14 days)^{[Died]}	Professor of Economics at the Erasmus University Rotterdam (1918–1945); Rector Magnificus of the Erasmus University Rotterdam (1921–1922, 1928–1929, 1935–1936); Professor of Economics at the University of Amsterdam (1945–1954)	Independent
Gerard Verrijn Stuart	Dr. Gerard Verrijn Stuart (1893–1969)	1 July 1958 – 1 May 1964 (5 years, 305 days)	Professor of Economics at the University of Amsterdam (1952–1962)	Independent
Jan de Pous	Jan de Pous (1920–1996)	1 May 1964 – 1 February 1985 (20 years, 276 days)	Minister of Economic Affairs (1959–1963); Member of the Council of State (1958–1959)	Christian Historical Union (1964–1980)
Jan de Pous	Jan de Pous (1920–1996)	1 May 1964 – 1 February 1985 (20 years, 276 days)	Minister of Economic Affairs (1959–1963); Member of the Council of State (1958–1959)	Christian Democratic Appeal (1980–1985)
Theo Quené	Dr. Theo Quené (1930–2011)	1 February 1985 – 1 January 1996 (10 years, 334 days)	Director of the Scientific Council for Government Policy (1978–1985)	Labour Party
Klaas de Vries	Klaas de Vries (born 1943)	1 January 1996 – 3 August 1998 (2 years, 214 days)^{[Res]} ^{[Note]}	Member of the House of Representatives (1973–1988)	Labour Party
Herman Wijffels	Dr. Herman Wijffels (born 1942)	1 January 1999 – 1 April 2006 (7 years, 90 days)	CEO and Chairman of the Rabobank (1986–1999)	Christian Democratic Appeal
Alexander Rinnooy Kan	Dr. Alexander Rinnooy Kan (born 1949)	1 April 2006 – 1 September 2012 (6 years, 164 days)	Member of the Social and Economic Council (1991–1996); Chairman of VNO-NCW (1991–1996)	Democrats 66
Wiebe Draijer	Wiebe Draijer (born 1965)	1 September 2012 – 10 September 2014 (2 years, 9 days)^{[Res]} ^{[Note]}	CEO and Chairman of the McKinsey & Company Netherlands (2003–2012)	Independent
Mariëtte Hamer	Mariëtte Hamer (born 1958)	10 September 2014 – 1 April 2022 (7 years, 203 days)	Member of the House of Representatives (1998–2014)	Labour Party
Kim Putters	Kim Putters (born 1973)	16 September 2022 – Incumbent (3 years, 212 days)	Member of the Senate (2003–2013); Chairman of The Netherlands Institute for Social Research (2013–2022)	Labour Party

^{Resigned}
^{Died in office}
^{Resigned when he was appointed as Minister of Social Affairs and Employment in the Second Kok cabinet}
^{Resigned when he was appointed as CEO and Chairman of the Rabobank}

== Current Members of the Social and Economic Council ==
=== Appointed Members of the Social and Economic Council ===
Appointed Members
Member		Appointed	Other function(s)	Member		Appointed	Other function(s)
Mariëtte Hamer	Mariëtte Hamer (born 1958)^{[Chairwoman]}	10 September 2014 (11 years, 218 days)			Dr. Pieter Hasekamp (born 1965)	1 March 2020 (6 years, 46 days)	Director of the Bureau for Economic; Policy Analysis
	Luce van Kempen (born 1995)	1 April 2020 (6 years, 15 days)	Chairwoman of the Youth Council		Dr. Romke van der Veen (born 1958)	1 April 2012 (14 years, 15 days)	Professor of Social and Behavioral Sciences; Erasmus University Rotterdam
	Dr. Evert Verhulp (born 1960)	1 April 2012 (14 years, 15 days)	Professor of Labour Law; University of Amsterdam	Kim Putters	Dr. Kim Putters (born 1973)	1 February 2017 (9 years, 74 days)	Professor of Healthcare; Management; Erasmus University Rotterdam Director of the Institute for Social Research
Ed Nijpels	Ed Nijpels (born 1950)	15 August 2014 (11 years, 244 days)	Chairman of the Climate Council Chairman of the Environment Central; Foundation		Dr. Geert ten Dam (born 1958)	10 December 2015 (10 years, 127 days)	Professor of Pedagogy; Free University Amsterdam President of the Council of the University of Amsterdam
	Dr. Maarten Lindeboom (born 1960)	1 September 2018 (7 years, 227 days)	Professor of Economics; Free University Amsterdam		Femke Laagland (born 1979)	1 July 2020 (7 years, 227 days)	Professor of Labour Law; Radboud University Nijmegen
	Dr. Olaf Sleijpen (born 1975)	1 April 2020 (6 years, 15 days)	Chief Financial Officer; De Nederlandsche Bank				

^{Chairwoman}

=== Trade associations Members of the Social and Economic Council ===
Trade Associations Members
Member		Appointed	Represents	Member		Appointed	Represents
Hans de Boer	Hans de Boer (born 1955)^{[Vice Chairman]}	1 July 2014 (11 years, 319 days)	Industry and Employers; Confederation		Jacco Vonhof (born 1970)	1 August 2018 (11 years, 258 days)	Small and Medium- Sized Association
	Patricia Hoogstraaten (born 1959)	1 May 2006 (19 years, 350 days)	Retail; Association	Guido van Woerkom	Guido van Woerkom (born 1955)	1 October 2013 (12 years, 197 days)	Travelers; Association
	Chris Buijink (born 1954)	1 June 2013 (12 years, 319 days)	Banking; Association		Dirk Beljaarts (born 1978)	1 January 2019 (7 years, 105 days)	Hospitality; Association
	Fried Kaanen (born 1955)	1 April 2017 (9 years, 15 days)	Manufacturing; Association		Niels Louwaars (born 1958)	10 December 2019 (6 years, 127 days)	Horticulture; Association
	Roderik Pape (born 1969)	1 April 2020 (6 years, 15 days)	Freelancers; Association		Hans van Waayenburg (born 1957)	15 February 2019 (7 years, 60 days)	CEO of Capgemini Netherlands

Deputy Trade Associations Members
Member		Appointed	Represents	Member		Appointed	Represents
Ineke Dezentjé Hamming-Bluemink	Ineke Dezentjé; Hamming-Bluemink (born 1954)	1 January 2012 (14 years, 105 days)	Technology Industry; Association	Henk Kamp	Henk Kamp (born 1952)	1 February 2018 (8 years, 74 days)	Healthcare Providers; Association
Ad Melkert	Ad Melkert (born 1956)	1 April 2019 (7 years, 15 days)	Hospitals; Association	Maxime Verhagen	Maxime Verhagen (born 1956)	1 October 2015 (10 years, 197 days)	Construction; Association
	Richard Weurding (born 1961)	1 April 2006 (20 years, 15 days)	Insurance; Association		Leendert-Jan Visser (born 1971)	1 April 2020 (6 years, 15 days)	Small and Medium- Sized Association
	Elisabeth Post (born 1965)	1 June 2019 (6 years, 319 days)	Transport; Association		Henk den Boer (born 1963)	1 April 2020 (6 years, 15 days)	Maintenance; Association

^{Vice Chairman by Ex officio as Chairman of the Industry and Employers confederation}

=== Trade union Members of the Social and Economic Council ===
Trade union Members
Member		Appointed	Represents	Member	Appointed	Represents
Han Busker	Han Busker (born 1955)^{[Vice Chairman]}	1 May 2016 (9 years, 350 days)	Federation of Trade Unions	Willem Jelle Berg (born 1969)	1 April 2014 (12 years, 15 days)	National Federation of Christian Trade Unions
	Nic van Holstein (born 1963)	1 September 2015 (10 years, 213 days)	Trade Union of Professionals	Gerrit van de Kamp (born 1964)	1 April 2019 (7 years, 15 days)	Police Trade Union
	Jan de Jong (born 1955)	1 August 2016 (9 years, 258 days)	Federation of Trade; Unions for Seniors	Bas van Weegberg (born 1996)	1 Juli 2019 (6 years, 289 days)	Federation of Trade; Unions for Youth
	Arend van Wijngaarden (born 1954)	1 November 2012 (13 years, 166 days)	National Federation of Christian Trade Unions	Zakaria Boufangacha (born 1973)	1 July 2017 (9 years, 350 days)	Federation of Trade Unions
	Tuur Elzinga (born 1965)	1 July 2017 (8 years, 319 days)	Federation of Trade Unions	Kitty Jong (born 1961)	1 July 2017 (8 years, 319 days)	Federation of Trade Unions
	Judy Hoffer (born 1970)	1 March 2019 (7 years, 46 days)	Federation of Trade Unions			

^{Vice Chairman by Ex officio as Chairman of the Federation of Trade Unions}

== See also ==
- Economic and Social Committee of the European Union.
