= 2023–2024 Dutch cabinet formation =

Formation of the Schoof cabinet

Following the Dutch general election of 22 November 2023, a process of cabinet formation was started. This resulted in the formation of the Schoof cabinet on 2 July 2024, comprising the Party for Freedom (PVV), the People's Party for Freedom and Democracy (VVD), New Social Contract (NSC) and the Farmer–Citizen Movement (BBB). Despite intentions to form an extra-parliamentary cabinet, the cabinet was generally considered a parliamentary cabinet.

As the largest party, the PVV initially nominated Gom van Strien as scout, but he was replaced by Ronald Plasterk (PvdA) due to unrelated fraud allegations. NSC and VVD were hesitant to govern with the PVV because some of its positions conflicted with the rule of law. Plasterk, as informateur, held talks with these parties and the BBB about the rule of law and other issues. After a month and a half, tensions over financial disagreements led NSC to withdraw from the formation talks on 6 February.

In February, Kim Putters (PvdA) was appointed informateur to determine the best structure for a new cabinet. He recommended forming an extra-parliamentary cabinet with PVV, VVD, NSC, and BBB. Under the guidance of informateurs Elbert Dijkgraaf and Richard van Zwol, these parties reached an agreement on 15 May. Minister selection began on 23 May with formateur Van Zwol. On 28 May, civil servant Dick Schoof (independent) was nominated as Prime Minister after Plasterk withdrew over integrity concerns and seven other candidates declined. The 29 cabinet members were sworn in on 2 July.

== Background ==
The previous fourth Rutte cabinet, formed in January 2022 after the longest ever formation, included the People's Party for Freedom and Democracy (VVD), Democrats 66 (D66), Christian Democratic Appeal (CDA) and the Christian Union (CU). After surviving multiple crises over the regulation of nitrogen emissions, the cabinet faced a further crisis over asylum policy. The VVD's proposed stricter measures were unacceptable to CU, leading CU to break off negotiations. Prime minister Mark Rutte therefore offered the resignation of his cabinet on 7 July 2023. This was seen by some as a power play by the VVD to force elections around an issue that benefited them. Shortly after, Rutte announced he would not continue as VVD leader.

=== Campaign ===
The Farmer–Citizen Movement (BBB) became the largest party in the provincial elections of March 2023, and therefore in the 2023 Senate election. The party maintained its lead in the polls until the fall of the cabinet, though subsequently lost this position, partly because the nitrogen crisis was rarely discussed during the campaign. The leading position in the polls then alternated between VVD, New Social Contract (NSC) and GroenLinks–PvdA (GL-PvdA). PVV party leader Geert Wilders' more constructive tone and a successful debate at SBS6 contributed to his party taking the lead in a Peil.nl poll in the last week. This stimulated strategic voting on both the left and the right to respectively prevent or force a right-wing cabinet, from which GL-PvdA and PVV particularly benefited.

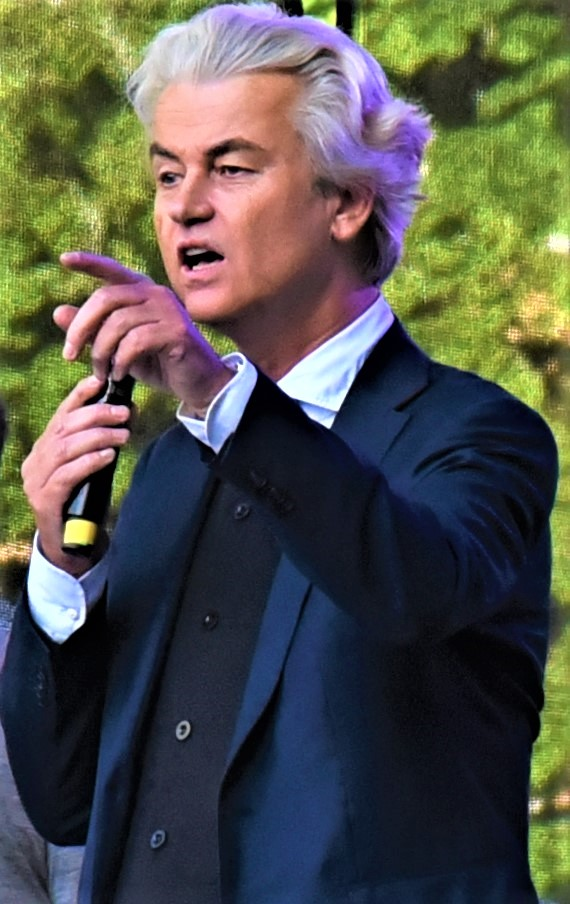
Leader of the PVV Geert Wilders, 2016

During the campaign, possible coalitions were discussed. GL-PvdA, D66, CDA and smaller parties continued to exclude the PVV. With the arrival of Dilan Yeşilgöz as party leader, the VVD did not rule out governing with the PVV for the first time since 2010. At the end of the campaign she partly reversed this, saying that she did not want to be in a cabinet in which Wilders' party was the largest. During the campaign, NSC leader Pieter Omtzigt remained vague about possible cooperation with the PVV. Towards the end indicated that he was not in favour, as he viewed some of the PVV's positions as contrary to the Constitution.

=== Election results ===
Composition of the elected House: SP: 5 PvdD: 3 Denk: 3 GL-PvdA: 25 Volt: 2 D66: 9 CU: 3 NSC: 20 VVD: 24 CDA: 5 BBB: 7 JA21: 1 SGP: 3 PVV: 37 FvD: 3

The PVV became the largest party in the elections with 37 seats. The coalition parties of the incumbent cabinet fell from 78 to 41 seats. Despite GL-PvdA becoming the second largest party, the left and progressive block as a whole fell from 63 to 47 seats. The three largest right-wing parties PVV, VVD and NSC got a majority of 81 seats in the House of Representatives. With only 14 seats in the Senate they were far removed from the 38 required for a majority. Supplemented with BBB, this combination resulted in 88 seats in the House and 30 in the Senate.

== Scout Van Strien ==
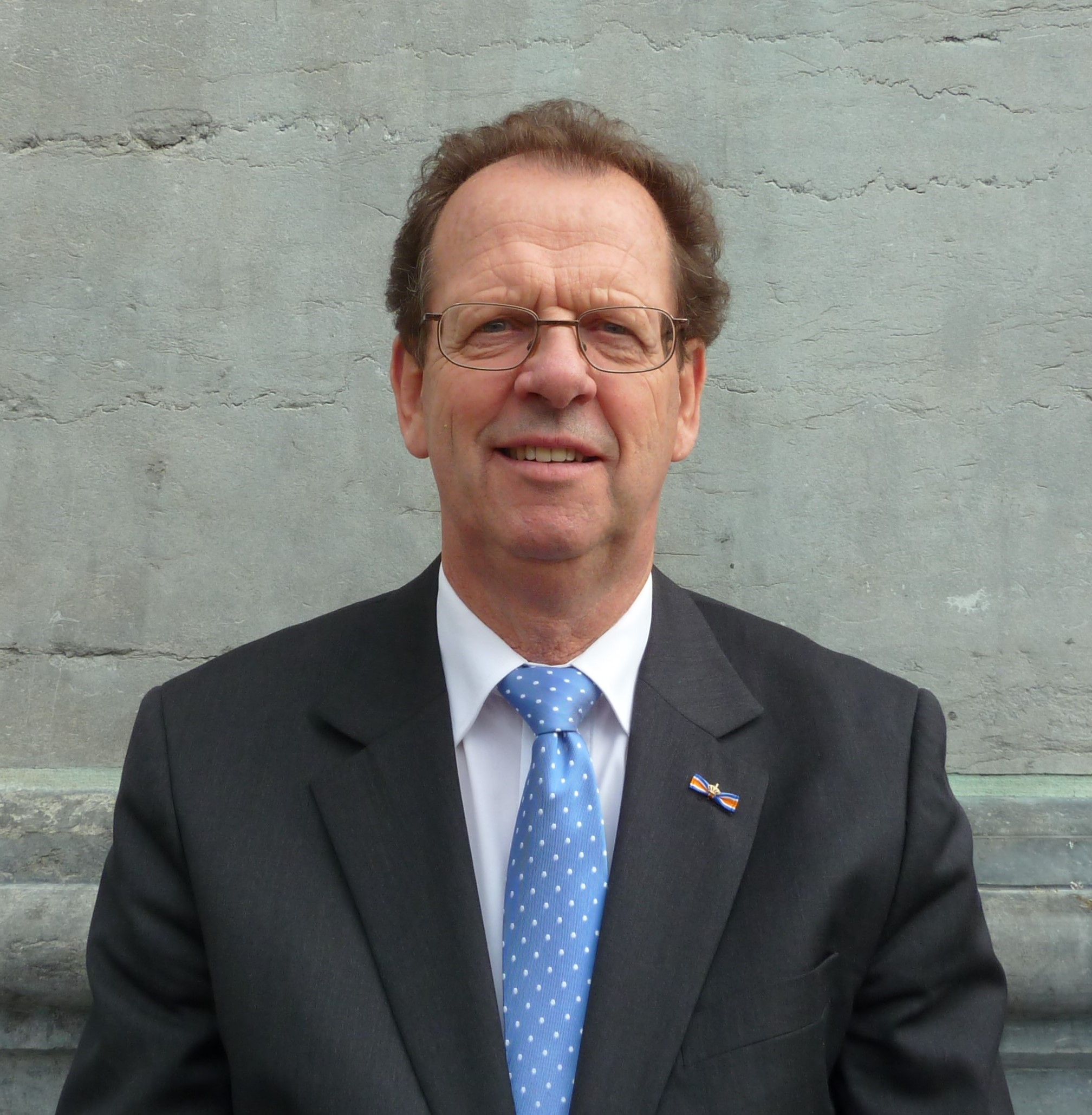
Scout Gom van Strien (PVV), 2014

On 24 November 2023, PVV Senator Gom van Strien was selected as scout, as proposed by Wilders. Van Strien's task was to explore "which coalition options can count on support based on the election results". Two days after the appointment, it became public that Van Strien was suspected of fraud. On 27 November, before meeting any party leaders, he resigned as scout.

== Scout Plasterk ==
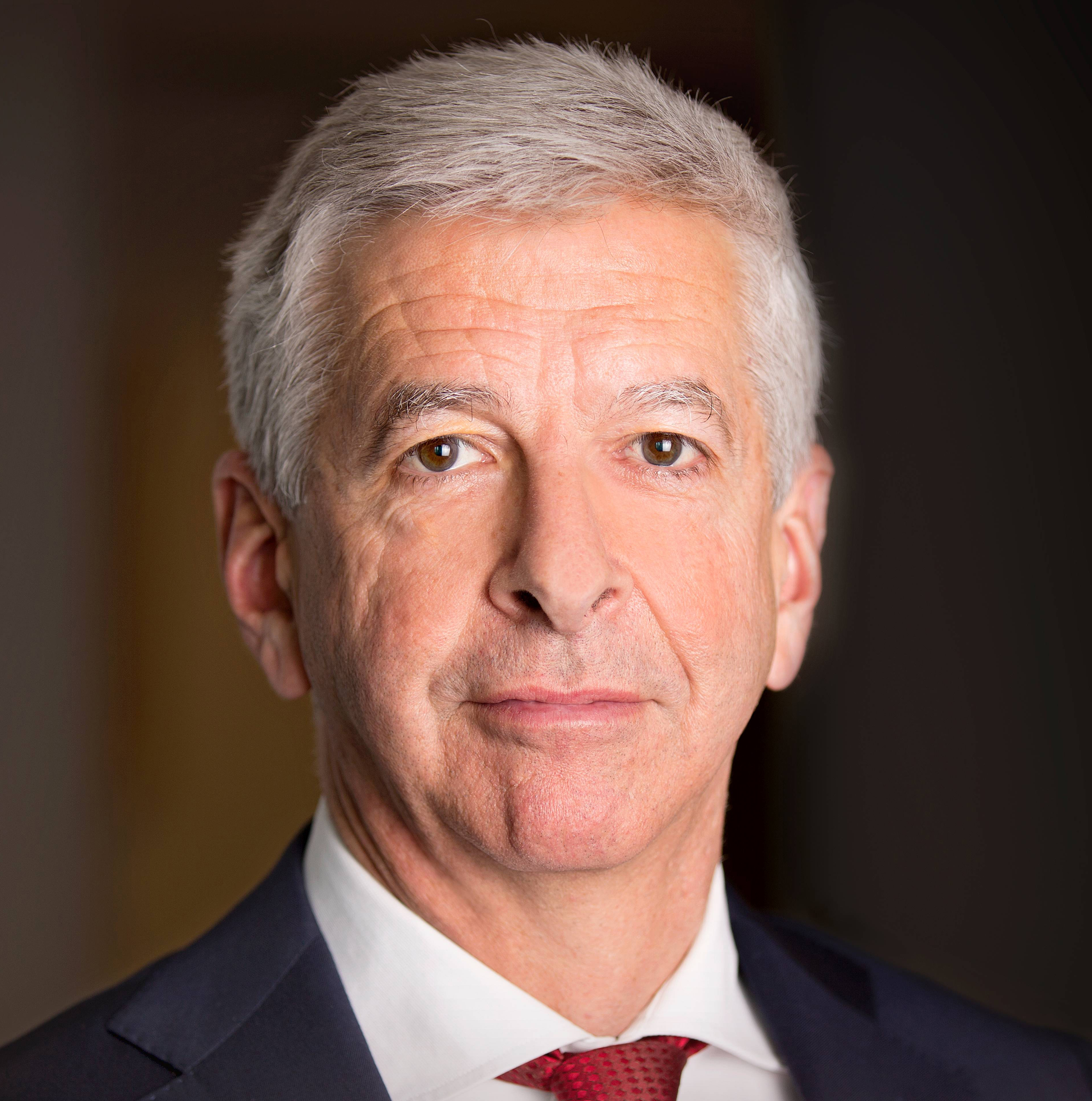
Scout and informateur Ronald Plasterk (PvdA), 2015

Wilders requested former VVD State Secretary Fred Teeven as a scout, but this was rejected by the other parties. Former CDA Minister Jan Kees de Jager was also asked, but he refused. On 28 November 2023, former PvdA Minister and Telegraaf columnist Ronald Plasterk was appointed as scout as proposed by Wilders. Shortly after the election, he had written in his column about a PVV, VVD, NSC, and BBB coalition: "All in all, there are no serious alternative coalitions. The formation process isn't terribly complicated and shouldn't take very long."

=== Coalition preferences ===
Coalitions acceptable to voters. Based on a poll from EenVandaag (23 November 2023)
Coalition	%
PVV + VVD + NSC + BBB	60
PVV + VVD + NSC	57
GL-PvdA + VVD + NSC + D66	26
GL-PvdA + NSC + D66 + PvdD + SP + CU	24

From 29 November until 1 December, Plasterk met with the party leaders. Wilders said he wanted to form a cabinet and proposed talks with VVD, NSC and BBB. BBB leader Caroline van der Plas also preferred this combination "if Geert [Wilders] moves along a bit". This combination was supported by FvD, SGP and JA21, who were open to supporting them in the Senate. VVD and NSC were more reluctant. Yeşilgöz stated just before Van Strien’s appointment that her party would not join the cabinet due to its electoral loss but would offer confidence and supply to a center-right government. In doing so, VVD claimed the position of confidence and supply, which was also sought by NSC.

Omtzigt told Plasterk that he was not ready to negotiate with the PVV because of concerns around the rule of law. He proposed that two informateurs would explore each party's preferred solutions to the problems under discussion. Wilders responded by reposting a column which called Omtzigt a "sneaky Catholic", and revealed that they had met in private two days before.

PvdD leader Esther Ouwehand wanted to hand the initiative to GL-PvdA and NSC and said that a coalition was possible "with many small parties in it, probably including ours". The other parties saw no role for themselves in this first phase. Timmermans called a cabinet with GL-PvdA and PVV a "no-go" and considered it "extremely unlikely" that there would be an opportunity for GL-PvdA to join a cabinet.

After the first round, Plasterk notified the House he would need another week. Between 4 and 7 December he met with pairs of party leaders from PVV, VVD, NSC and BBB. He met twice with Wilders and Omtzigt. After the first, they said that "some air had been cleared" between them.

=== Advice ===
On 11 December 2023, Plasterk handed his report to the Speaker of the House of Representatives. In it he recommended appointing an informateur to investigate whether an agreement can be reached between the PVV, VVD, NSC and BBB "on a joint baseline for guaranteeing the Constitution, fundamental rights and the democratic rule of law". The informateur should then explore whether there is a realistic prospect that the parties can reach agreement on a number of issues, including migration, good governance, climate, the nitrogen crisis and social security.

== Informateur Plasterk ==
During the debate on 13 December 2023 about the advice, the House appointed Plasterk as informateur. He started talks with the parties the next day. The parties agreed to keep 'radio silence'. The party leaders were accompanied by Sophie Hermans and Eelco Heinen (VVD), Eddy van Hijum (NSC), Mona Keijzer and Henk Vermeer (BBB), Gidi Markuszower and Fleur Agema (PVV).

Over the following weeks – with an interruption of the Christmas recess – the parties discussed the rule of law. During this time, Wilders withdrew a number of bills which, according to the Council of State, may have been contrary to the rule of law. On 10 January 2024, at the end of a three-day meeting on the De Zwaluwenberg estate, the parties concluded their discussions, agreeing, among other things, that the rule of law, the Constitution, judicial decisions and international treaties would be respected. Despite the agreement, the NSC told the other negotiators that it would only provide supply and confidence to a cabinet because of the 'rule of law distance' with the PVV.

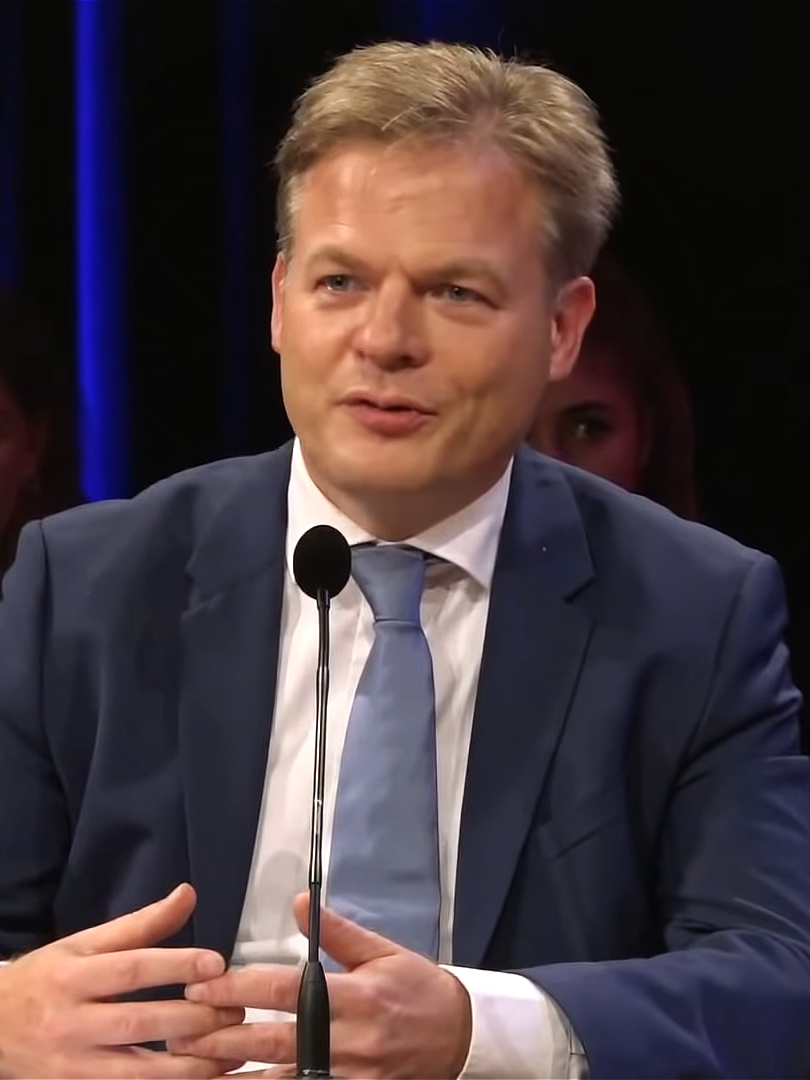
Party leader of NSC Pieter Omtzigt, 2021

Another topic of discussion was whether the parties could reach an agreement over finances. The parties were informed by the Ministry of Finance, De Nederlandsche Bank and the Central Planning Bureau, who had previously recommended cuts of 17 billion. VVD and NSC argued in favour of strict budget discipline, while BBB and PVV opposed major cuts. In addition, there were concerns about BBB's financial knowledge. At Omtzigt's insistence, all ministries were asked to inform the negotiators about possible financial setbacks.

=== Collapse of the negotiations ===
On 5 February, the negotiators met without Plasterk for an away-day at the Ministry of Justice and Security, where Yeşilgöz was minister. The atmosphere had deteriorated in the days before, as the parties publicly attacked each other. Omtzigt was hesitant and made "retreating movements" that day. A day later, the information about the possible financial setbacks, requested by Omtzigt, was shared. Omtzigt argued that Plasterk had shared this information too late, and criticized the attitude of the other parties towards the financial risks.

Omtzigt left the meeting in the afternoon and – borrowing the informateur's car and driver – returned to his hotel. He invited three journalists to inform them, under embargo, that this formation round was over for NSC. Before the embargo was over, and before he had informed the other parties, NSC's letter to its members about the news was leaked. Omtzigt therefore informed the co-negotiators and informateur via an app message. Plasterk invited NSC to the rest of the meetings that week, but Omtzigt did not respond.

On 12 February, Plasterk handed his report over to Speaker of the House of Representatives Martin Bosma. In the report, Plasterk concluded that despite NSC's departure, an agreement between the four parties "is not excluded and can very well be achieved". He advised appointing a new informateur to determine whether the parties could reach an agreement. During the debate on the final report on 14 February, Plasterk mentioned that Omtzigt had used the informateur's official car on 6 February to be driven to the hotel where he briefed the journalists.

== Informateur Putters ==
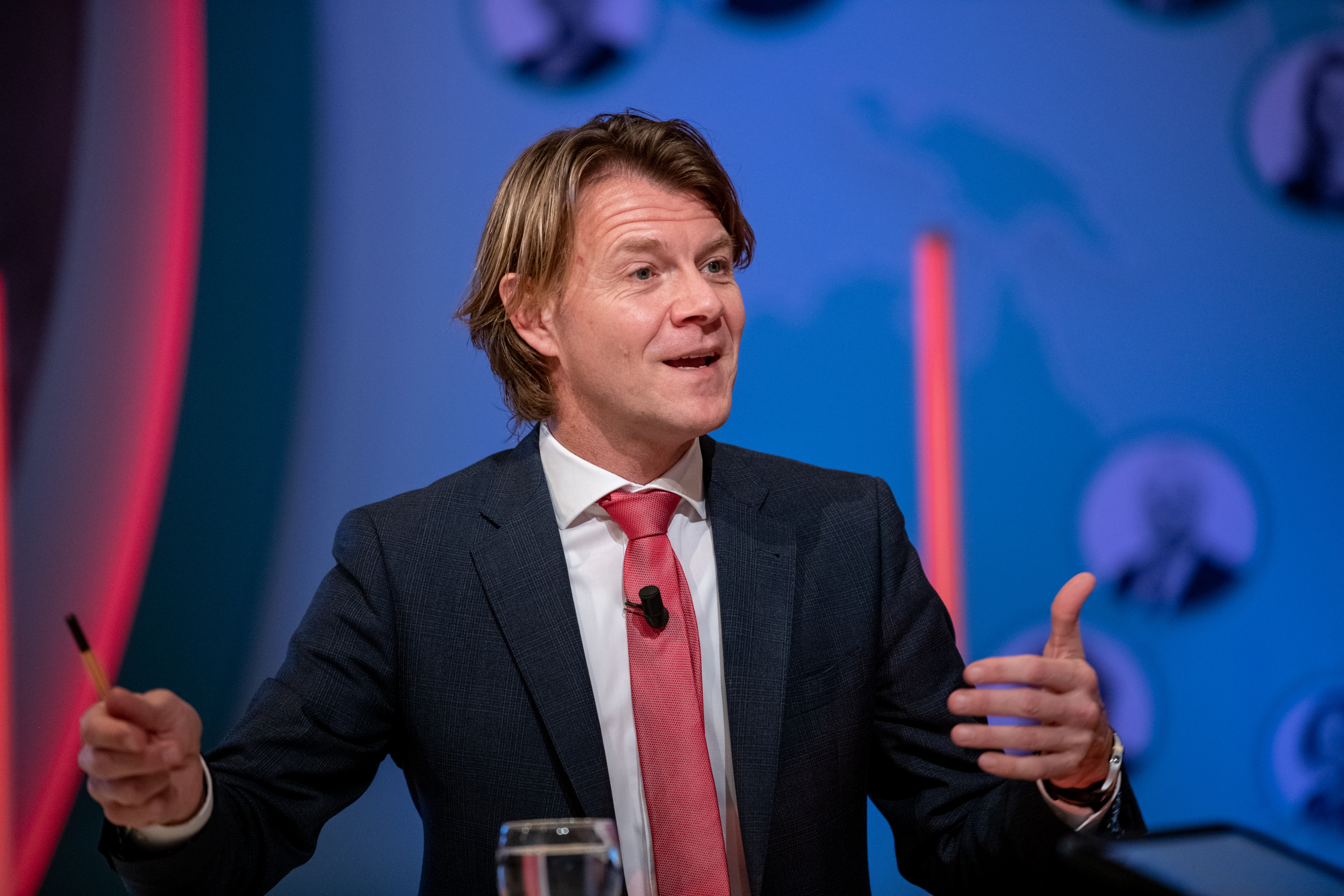
Kim Putters (PvdA), 2015

Wilders approached State Secretary for the CDA Marnix van Rij to replace Plasterk, but he refused. During the debate on 14 February 2024, Kim Putters, chairman of the Social and Economic Council and former PvdA senator, was appointed as informateur, based on a proposal by Wilders. His assignment was to investigate within four weeks what form a cabinet should take, such as a minority or extra-parliamentary cabinet. During the spring recess, Putters consulted with experts, such as former informateur Herman Tjeenk Willink and vice-president of the Council of State Thom de Graaf, and then invited all parliamentary leaders. From those conversations he concluded that neither a majority cabinet nor a cabinet with confidence and supply was possible, and began investigating whether it was possible to form an extra-parliamentary cabinet with PVV, VVD, NSC and BBB.

These four parties then entered into discussions with the informateur, alone and in pairs. On 1 March, De Telegraaf journalist Wouter de Winther reported that Omtzigt was regularly walking away from the negotiations crying, which he denied, and that other negotiators were complaining about his emotional and fickle behaviour. Omtzigt's behaviour and the atmosphere between the negotiators was subsequently said to improve.

On 11 and 12 March, the four party leaders met again at the De Zwaluwenberg estate. They again concluded that a majority cabinet with the four parties was not possible, and therefore agreed to form a variant of an extra-parliamentary cabinet, a so-called 'program cabinet'. Such a program cabinet must have an agreement in outline, which is then elaborated by the cabinet. The cabinet must contain ministers both with and without "political anchorage". The party leaders should not sit in such a cabinet, but remain in the House of Representatives. Wilders would therefore, at the insistence of NSC, not become prime minister. On 14 March, Putters submitted his advice with the recommendation to have the four parties substantively negotiate such a program cabinet.

== Informateurs Dijkgraaf and Van Zwol ==
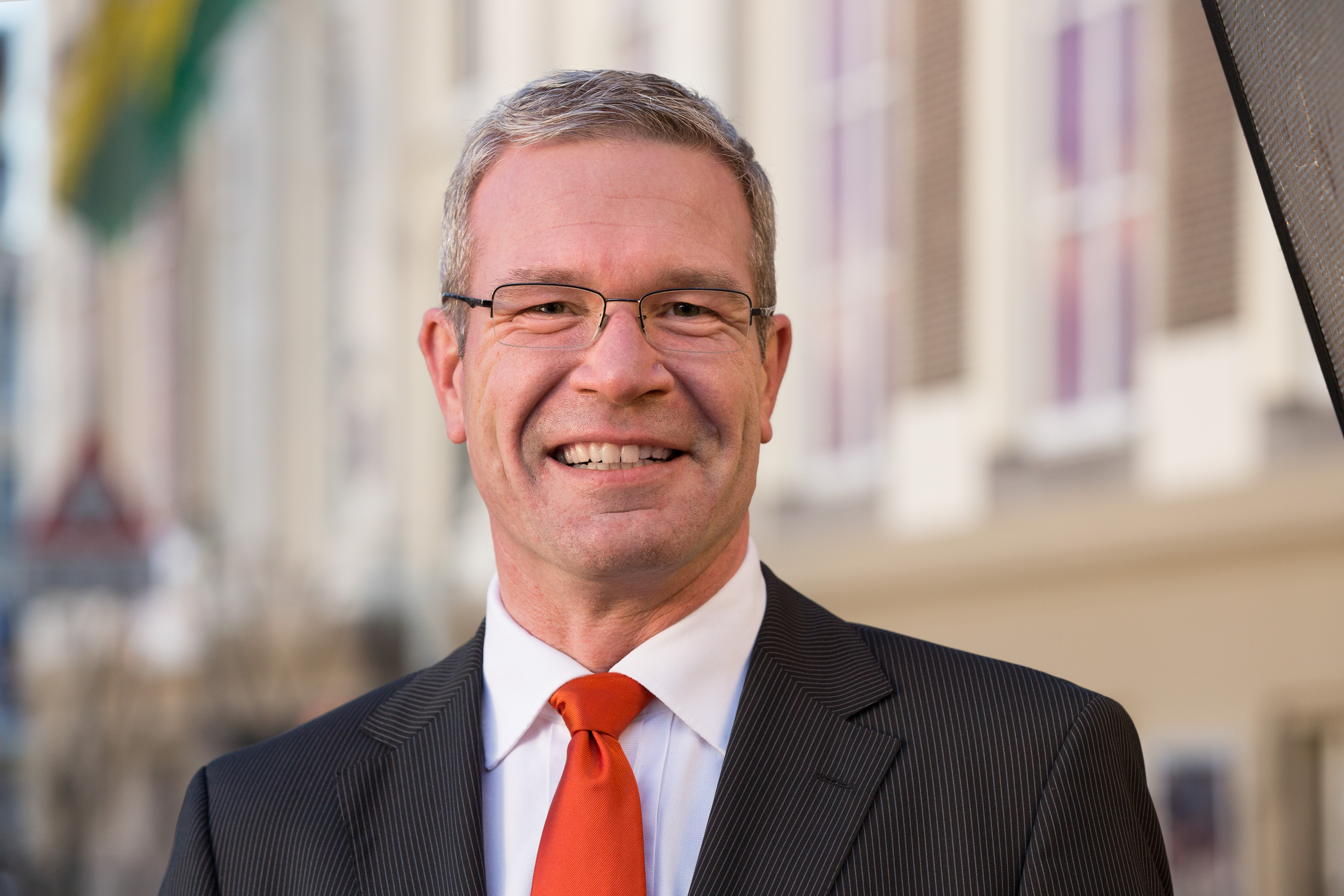
Informateur Elbert Dijkgraaf, 2016

During the debate on 20 March with Putters, the House of Representatives agreed to Wilders' proposal to appoint former MP Elbert Dijkgraaf (SGP) and member of the Council of State Richard van Zwol (CDA) to be appointed as informateurs for the negotiations between PVV, VVD, NSC and BBB. In the first two-week phase, they discussed all the topics which Putters had indicated would require broad agreement. A number of topics such as climate and education were added. After this round, they discussed the topics in depth.

Finances again proved to be a bottleneck, making negotiations difficult. Unusually for a negotiation phase, the informateurs held separate discussions with the parties between 4 and 10 April. A week later, migration emerged as a further bottleneck. On 15 April, Wilders left a meeting early, stating that he had received insufficient support from the other parties to limit the number of asylum seekers.

The informateurs worked towards a deadline of 15 May. From 6 May, decisions began to be made and long negotiation days were held. On the final day, which was intended to be dedicated to finalizing details, the negotiations dragged on because Omtzigt wanted to amend the Future Pensions Act. This was blocked by the VVD, as the matter had already been addressed, and in the end, pensions were not included in the agreement. By the end of the afternoon, the four parties reached a negotiation agreement (titled: Hope, Courage, and Pride), which was approved by their four parliamentary groups later that evening. MP Lilian Helder (BBB) did not support the agreement, but did not make that known until her resignation in early 2025. The informateurs then submitted their final report to the Speaker of the House in the night.

=== Prime ministerial candidate Plasterk ===
Wilders suggested nominating Plasterk as Prime Minister, though this was blocked by Omtzigt, due to the negative relationship between them since Plasterk's informateurship, and due to a possible integrity violation surrounding patents which came to light during the formation. It was thus recommended to appoint Van Zwol as formateur. On 17 May, a letter from Plasterk appeared in the De Telegraaf, in which he apologized for mentioning Omtzigt's use of his official car. On 20 May, Plasterk renounced his candidacy because of the accusations.

== Formateur Van Zwol ==
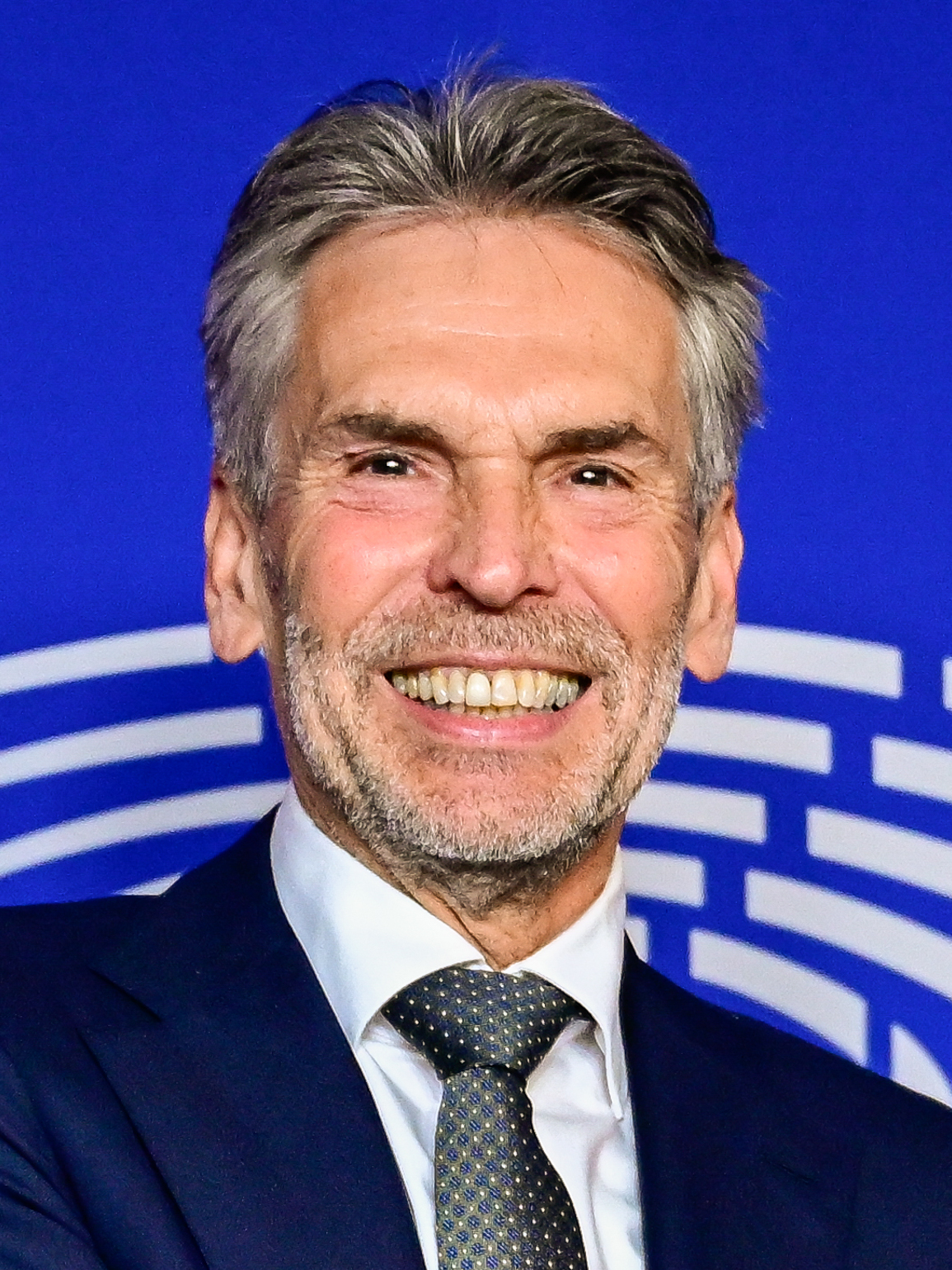
Dick Schoof, nominated as prime minister in 2024

On 22 May, Richard van Zwol was appointed formateur. The party leaders compiled a list of eight candidates for the position of prime minister. Former informateur Putters, informateur Van Zwol, former minister De Jager, former SGP leader Kees van der Staaij, and Speaker of the House Martin Bosma (PVV) all declined. Former informateur Dijkgraaf was ultimately not contacted, as it was assumed he would decline. Former state secretary Van Rij met with the leaders on 27 May, but declined the following day. The other candidate who was interviewed was Dick Schoof, secretary-general at the Ministry of Justice and Security, who had been recommended by his minister, Yeşilgöz. Schoof was a member of the PvdA until 2021 and had been independent since then. He was nominated by the four parties on 28 May.

After the nomination, the discussion moved to the allocation of other posts, which had not been discussed in previous phases. By custom, the second largest party nominates the powerful minister of Finance, thus the VVD planned to nominate Eelco Heinen. However, as the nominated prime minister was not a member of the largest party, the PVV also claimed the post. PVV eventually agreed to VVD's claim, and was compensated with another important post. BBB was unhappy that they were only allowed to appoint two ministers, including the limited portfolio of the Education, Culture and Science ministry. As a compromise, and following pressure on all parties from formateur Van Zwol, NSC gave the Ministry of Housing and Spatial Planning to BBB.

On 11 June, the four parties reached an agreement on who would be the ministers and state secretaries. Gidi Markuszower (PVV) was nominated as First Deputy Prime Minister of the Netherlands and Minister of Asylum and Migration. His nomination was withdrawn by Wilders on 13 June after a screening by the General Intelligence and Security Service. Instead, Wilders nominated Marjolein Faber, another MP. The next day Yeşilgöz called this nomination "not uncontroversial", because of statements made in the past by Faber. Yeşilgöz's comments led to a crisis meeting in the afternoon with party leaders, in which they decided to keep Faber as the nominee.

=== Hearings ===
For the first time in a Dutch cabinet formation, the House of Representatives held hearings with the candidates (except the prime minister) between 20 and 26 June. Candidates, grouped by ministry, introduced themselves and took questions from MPs. The House does not vote on candidates before appointment. Four opposition parties, CDA, CU, SGP and SP did not participate, as they argued the hearings would become a spectacle. Candidates were asked repeatedly about the previous statements of PVV candidates, such as comments by Faber and Reinette Klever on the white replacement conspiracy theory. To varying degrees, PVV candidates distanced themselves from their past statements. Seven months after the formation, the House of Representatives decided to remove the hearings from the procedure.

=== Finalization ===
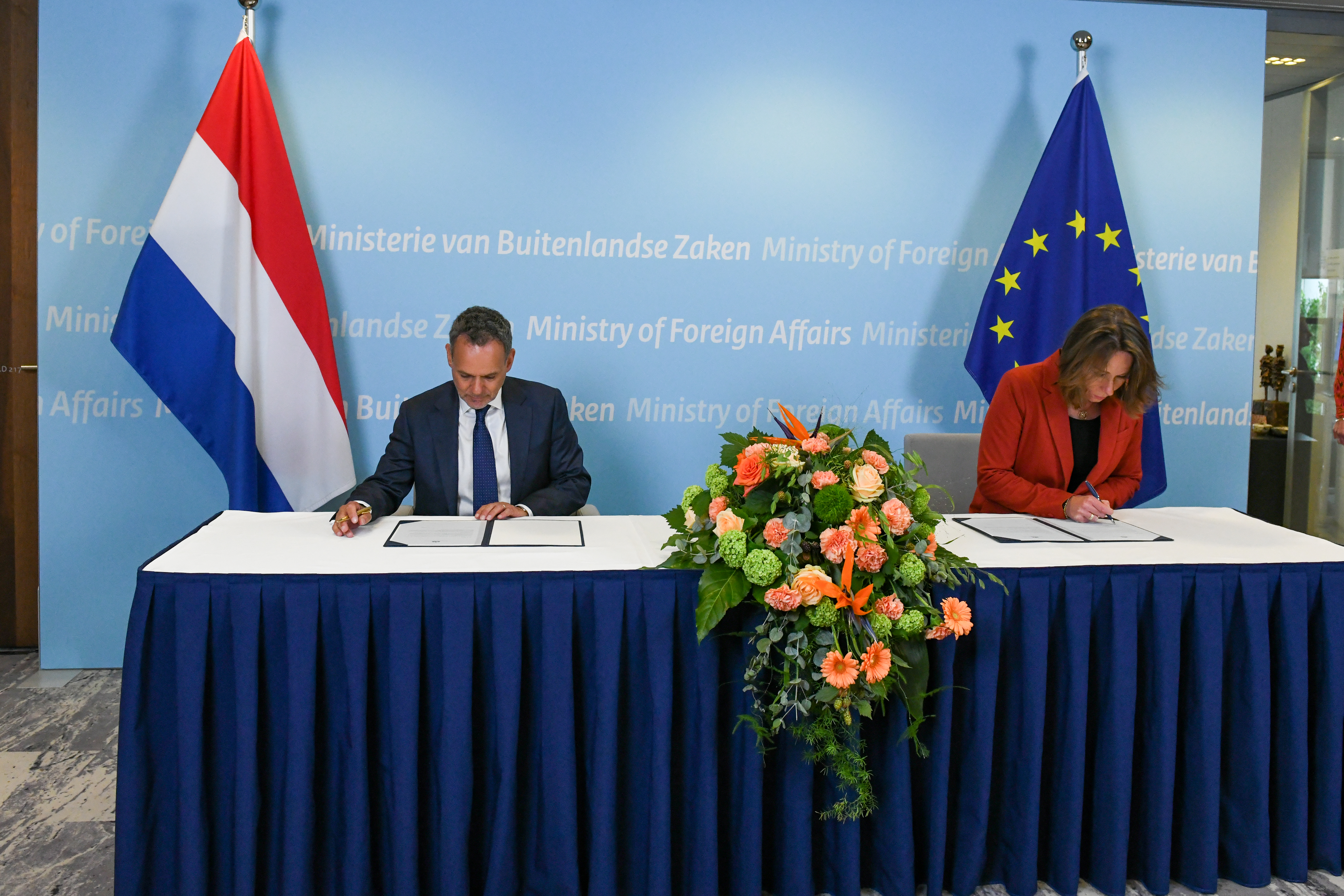
Incoming minister of Foreign Affairs Caspar Veldkamp (l) and outgoing minister Hanke Bruins Slot sign the transfer documents on 2 July 2024

On 1 July, the constitutive deliberation took place. Afterwards Van Zwol handed his final report to the Speaker of the House. On 2 July, the ministers and state secretaries of the Schoof cabinet were sworn in. The next day, Schoof delivered the government's policy statement. The subsequent debate was chaotic. PVV deputy prime minister Fleur Agema posted a tweet during the debate that seemed to contradict what Schoof was saying. Wilders also said that Schoof did not sufficiently stand up for ministers Klever and Faber, and called his response to questions about them "weak". The coalition leaders in the House were also regularly at odds. In the end, three separate motions of no confidence toward Faber, Klever, and the entire cabinet failed to obtain a majority.

== Sources ==
- Aharouay, Lamyae; De Koning, Petra (2025). Dick Schoof (in Dutch). Brooklyn. ISBN 978-94-92754-75-2.
- Vullings, Joost; Van der Wulp, Xander (2024). Het jaar van Caroline, Pieter en Geert. Een politieke aardverschuiving aan het einde van het Rutte-tijdperk (in Dutch). Nieuw Amsterdam. ISBN 978-90-468-3317-9.
