= Dutch National Youth Council =

Dutch youth umbrella organization

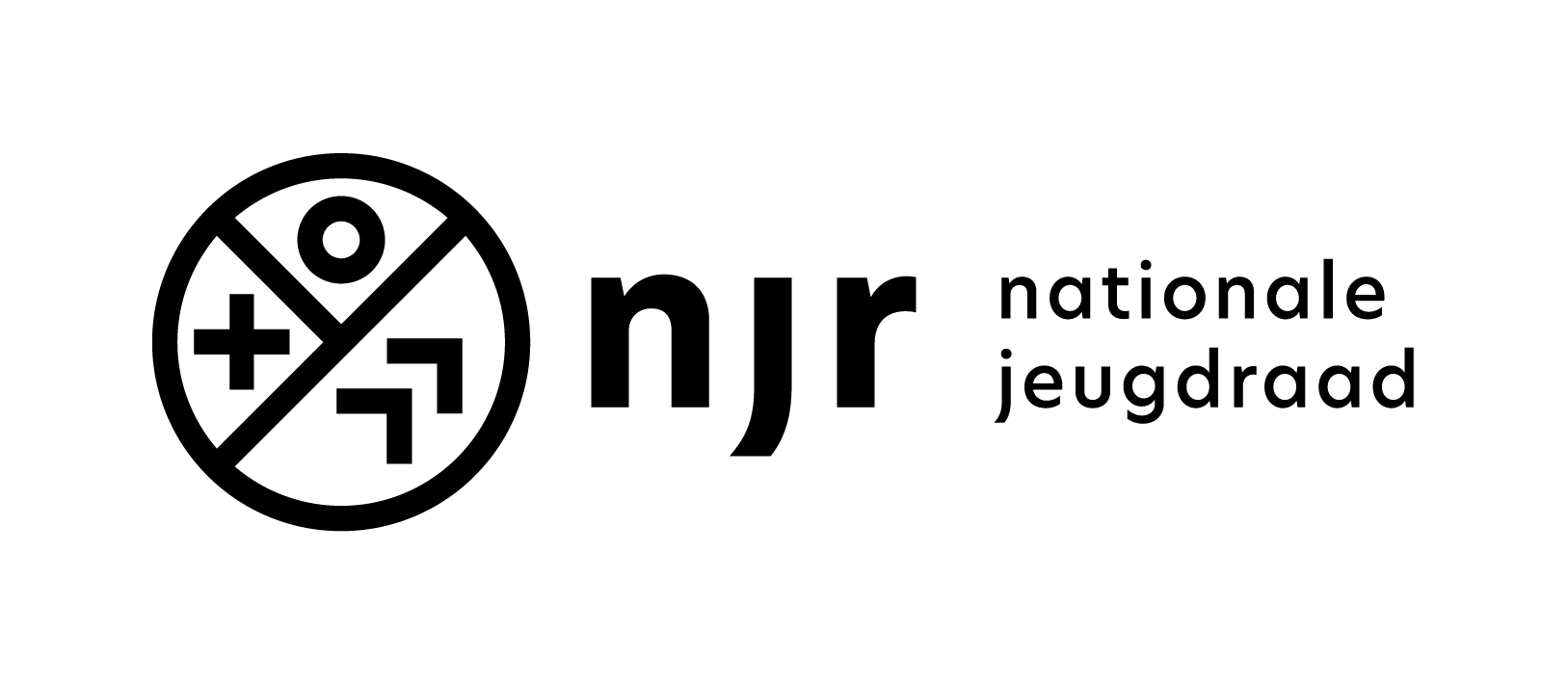
- Logo of the Dutch National Youth Council (NJR / DNYC)

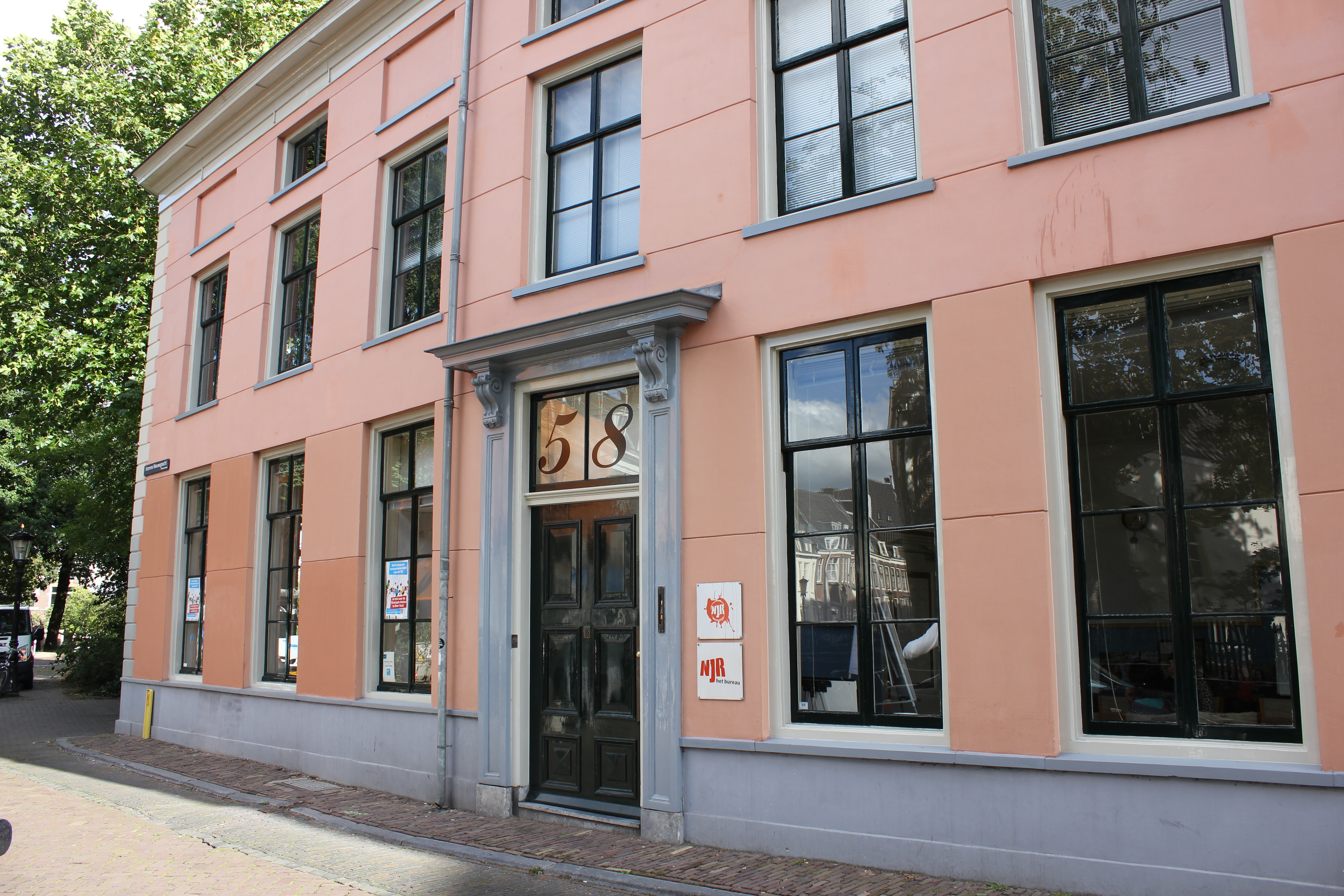
- NJR / DNYC headquarters in Utrecht, the Netherlands
- Abbreviation: NJR / DNYC
- Formation: June 11, 2001; 24 years ago
- Type: Youth organization
- Purpose: Offering opportunities to young people, ensuring others do the same, ensuring that this happens in the best way possible and inspiring young people to make use of those opportunities.
- Headquarters: Utrecht
- Location: Netherlands
- Affiliations: European Youth Forum
- Website: https://www.njr.nl/en/

The Dutch National Youth Council, abbreviated to NJR / DNYC, is an umbrella organization of Dutch national youth organizations for young people between the ages of 12 and 30. NJR / DNYC aims to encourage and support youth participation at all levels of society; ensure that young people know, develop and use their strengths for a better future for themselves and others. NJR / DNYC encourages young people to show what they are capable of, from their communities to the United Nations. In addition, the NJR / DNYC advises Dutch government bodies and other organizations on youth policy and stimulating youth participation.

The organization consists of a 7-member board and a work organization consisting of more than 40 employees and trainees.

== History ==
The NJR / DNYC was founded in June 2001. Participating organizations that fully or partially merged into NJR / DNYC were the Dutch National Youth Council for Environment and Development (NJMO), the Union 31, the Dutch Youth Group, the foundation National Youth Debate and the Youth Network of the Netherlands. The NJR / DNYC was given two tasks: stimulating and supporting youth participation and representing and bringing together young people and their organizations. It is also stipulated that the Dutch National Youth Council will not operate in place of well-functioning youth organizations, but will fulfill a coordinating and supporting role.

From 2009, the Dutch National Youth Council has been exclusively using the abbreviation NJR / DNYC in English and NJR in Dutch.

== Projects ==
The NJR / DNYC organizes various projects for and by young people. Through these projects, the NJR / DNYC ensures that young people are empowered, discover their strengths and, based on that, can contribute to society. In this way, young people can exert influence in their own neighbourhood, school, on a national level or even on an international level.

== Dutch Youth Representatives ==
Every year the NJR / DNYC organizes the election of the Dutch youth representatives. These are young people between the ages of 18 and 25 who represent their peers on four themes: Sustainable development, European affairs, Biodiversity & Food and Human rights & security. Two youth representatives are active per theme.

The eight youth representatives travel throughout the country to hear from young people what they consider important. The youth representatives take this with them to conferences and summits at home and abroad. Youth representatives work in pairs, according to a junior-senior system. Each year, a new representative is elected for two years for each of the four themes.

== Member organizations ==
More than 40 youth organizations come together at NJR / DNYC. These organizations represent diverse groups and interests.

== Board ==
The board of the NJR / DNYC consists of seven young people. The board changes annually, but according to the statutes board members may apply again for a term of one year after a term of one year.

== Board of Advisory ==
The Board of Advisory of the NJR / DNYC currently has eight members that frequently advise the board. The current members of the Board of Advisory are: Princess Laurentien of the Netherlands, Mariëtte Hamer, Kim Putters, Walter Groenen, Kim Heinz, Lisa Westerveld, Hans Gennissen and Farid Tabarki.
