= Richard van Zwol =

Dutch civil servant (born 1965)

- Born: 8 February 1965 (age 61); Amsterdam, Netherlands
- Education: Tilburg University
- Occupation: Civil servant
- Political party: Christian Democratic Appeal

Richard van Zwol (Dutch pronunciation: [ˈriɕɑrt fɑn ˈzʋɔl]; born 8 February 1965) is a Dutch civil servant who has been a member of the Council of State since 2017. He led three government ministries as secretary general: General Affairs (2007–2011), Finance (2011–2013) and Interior and Kingdom Relations (2013–2017). A member of the Christian Democratic Appeal (CDA), Van Zwol has been involved in several cabinet formations, including as formateur and informateur in 2023–2024.

== Career ==
Van Zwol studied legal public administration and public finance at Tilburg University. He was a close advisor to prime ministers Wim Kok, Jan Peter Balkenende, and Mark Rutte, leading newspaper NRC to call him a "hidden force of the Dutch government". He helped write the coalition agreement of the first Kok cabinet in 1994, reportedly due to him being the only civil servant with proficiency in the Microsoft Excel spreadsheet editor. Starting in 2007, Van Zwol consecutively served as secretary general of the Ministries of General Affairs, of Finance, and of the Interior and Kingdom Relations. He is a member of the Christian Democratic Appeal (CDA), and he was involved in the formation of the second, third, and fourth Balkenende cabinets as secretary.

He became a state councilor at the advisory division of the Council of State in October 2017. Concurrently, he served as chair of the CDA's think tank between 2018 and 2022, and he investigated the CDA's loss of seats in the 2021 general election. Van Zwol has argued that the rule of law and local governments would have to be strengthened to heal the relationship between the government and citizens. He has also stressed the importance of a service-oriented government. Van Zwol chairs the supervisory board of the Dutch branch of accounting firm EY, and he led the State Commission on Demographic Developments 2050, which published its conclusions in January 2024. It advised the Dutch government to reduce migration while still preventing a population decline.

On 20 March 2024 – as part of the 2023–2024 Dutch cabinet formation – PVV leader Geert Wilders selected Van Zwol to serve as informateur alongside Elbert Dijkgraaf. They were tasked with investigating a governing coalition with a concise agreement between the PVV, VVD, NSC, and BBB as recommended by their predecessor Kim Putters within eight weeks. The four party leaders had agreed that none of them would head a potential cabinet as prime minister. Van Zwol and Dijkgraaf managed to successfully facilitate the formation of a coalition, and they handed the agreement titled "Hope, Courage, and Pride" to the Speaker of the House of Representatives in the night of 16 May 2024 – two hours after the expiration of their deadline. Van Zwol was chosen to lead the next phase as formateur. He was charged with forming a cabinet, of which half its members are from outside the political sphere – as had been agreed upon by the four parties under informateur Putters. The Schoof cabinet, consisting of 29 members and headed by Dick Schoof, was sworn in on 2 July 2024. Van Zwol had declined to become prime minister himself. In a December 2024 interview, he told that he would have preferred Wilders as prime minister, arguing that the election winner had the clearest mandate.
