= Elbert Dijkgraaf =

Dutch economist and politician

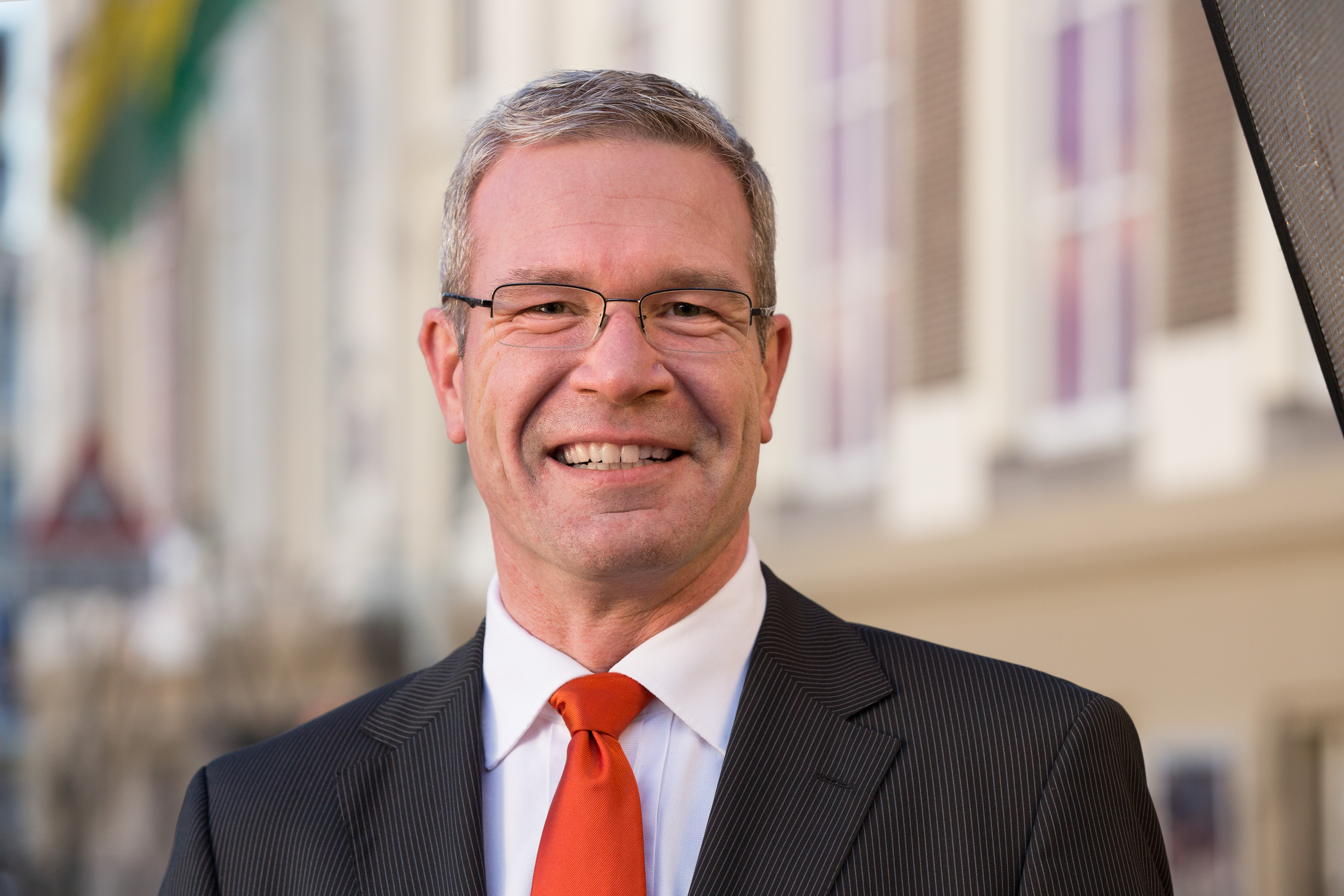

Member of the House of Representatives
- In office 17 June 2010 – 10 April 2018

Personal details
- Born: 6 January 1970 (age 56) Almelo, Netherlands
- Party: Reformed Political Party
- Spouse: Tamara van Ark (m. 2021)
- Children: 3
- Occupation: Politician; professor

Elbert Dijkgraaf (born 6 January 1970) is a Dutch economist and politician of the Reformed Political Party (SGP). He is professor at the Erasmus School of Economics where he holds the chair "Empirical economics of the public sector". He also is fellow of the Tinbergen Institute.

== Life ==
Dijkgraaf studied economics at Erasmus University Rotterdam and is a member of the Reformed Congregations. From 1999 to 2003, Dijkgraaf was chairperson of the Reformed Political Party Youth, and he ran unsuccessfully for the House of Representatives in the 2006 general election. He became a professor at his alma mater in 2009, and he researched the government's role in environmental matters such as climate and potable water.

He held a seat in the House of Representatives from 17 June 2010 until 10 April 2018. He focused on matters of financial, economic and social affairs, infrastructure, natural environment, education and culture. He expressed anti-abortion opinions, and he advocated for Sunday's significance as a day of rest. Following several months of absence due to exhaustion, Dijkgraaf decided to step down as a member of parliament in 2018 citing tensions in his marriage. After a divorce, he entered into a relationship with Tamara van Ark, who is a politician and former Minister for Medical Care for the People's Party for Freedom and Democracy (VVD). The couple later got married. Dijkgraaf also continued his academic career as an economics professor at Erasmus University, and he established his own consultancy practice. He served on government committees to research the nitrogen crisis in the Netherlands, the future of accountancy, and the effects of a shrinking population on secondary education. He was on the supervisory board of Wageningen University & Research and on the board of the Noaber Foundation, the family office of Paul Baan.

On 20 March 2024 – as part of the 2023–2024 cabinet formation – Dijkgraaf was selected by PVV leader Geert Wilders to serve as informateur alongside Richard van Zwol. They were tasked with investigating a governing coalition with a concise agreement between the PVV, VVD, NSC, and BBB as recommended by their predecessor Kim Putters within eight weeks. Dijkgraaf and Van Zwol managed to successfully facilitate the formation of a coalition, and they handed the agreement titled "Hope, Courage, and Pride" to the Speaker of the Speaker of the House of Representatives in the night of 16 May – two hours after the expiration of their deadline.
