= VNO =

VNO may mean:

- VNÖ (Verband der Naturparke Österreichs), the Association of Austrian Nature Parks
- V_{NO} speed, the maximum safe cruise speed of an aircraft
- Vilnius International Airport, Lithuania, IATA code
- Virtual network operator, a network service provider that does not own telecoms infrastructure
- Vomeronasal organ, an auxiliary olfactory sense organ in some tetrapods
- Vornado Realty Trust, a real estate investment trust

== See also ==
- VNO-NCW (Confederation of Netherlands Industry and Employers), a Dutch employers' federation
