= Henk Leenders =

Dutch politician

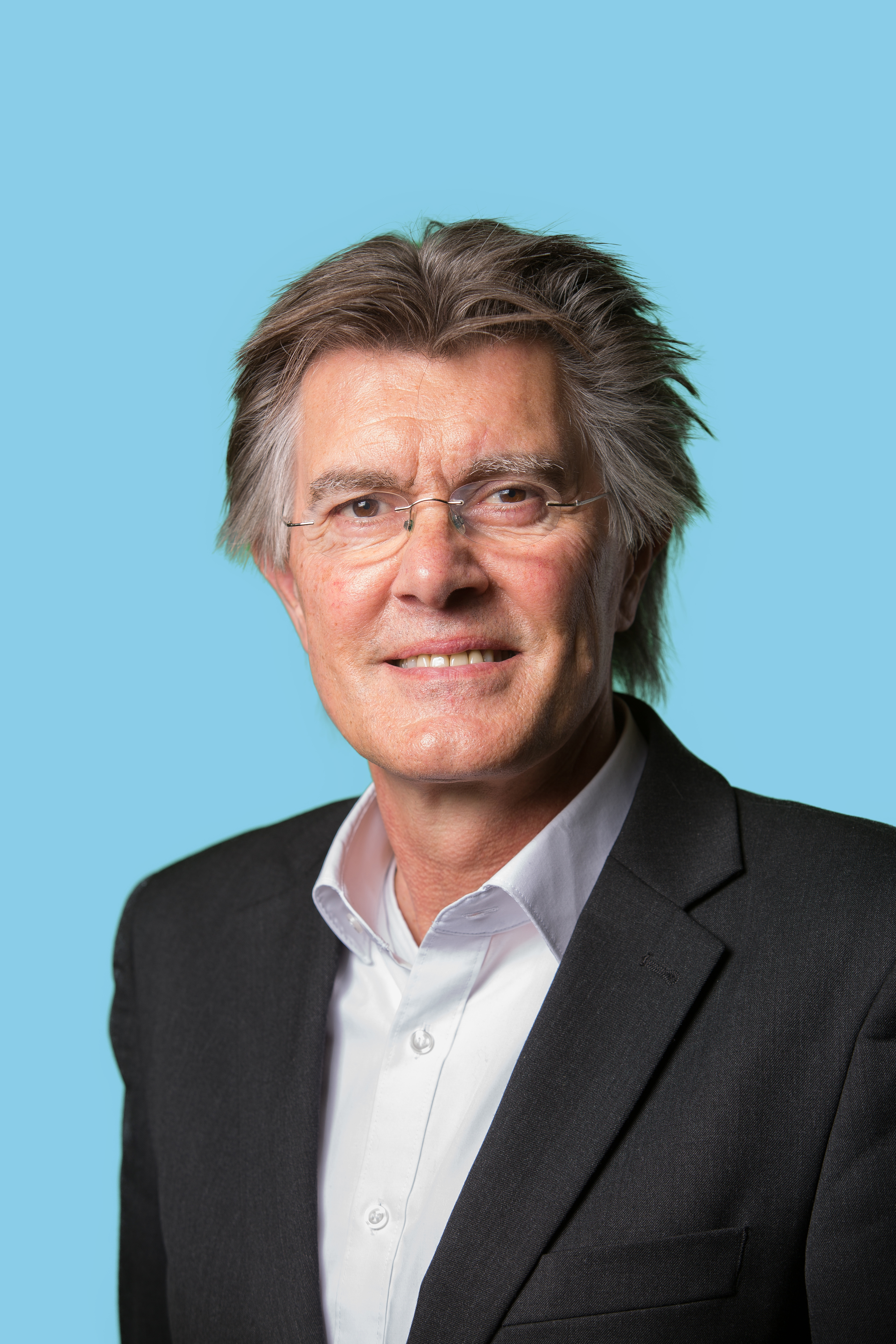

Member of the House of Representatives of the Netherlands
- In office 10 September 2014 – 23 March 2017

Member of the House of Representatives of the Netherlands
- In office 3 September 2013 – 11 December 2013

Personal details
- Born: 28 January 1955 (age 70) Elst, Netherlands
- Political party: Labour Party

Henk Leenders (born 28 January 1955) is a Dutch politician.

Leenders studied nursing at the Canisius Wilhelmina Hospital in Nijmegen between 1972 and 1976, he followed this up with a study of management at the HAN University of Applied Sciences between 1979 and 1981. He studied health sciences at Maastricht University between 1989 and 1992.

He was member of the municipal council of Breda 16 March 2006 and 11 March 2010. He was a member of the States of North Brabant between 10 March 2011 and 3 October 2014, where he served as party leader.

On 3 September 2013 he was installed as member of the Dutch House of Representatives as a temporary replacement for Yasemin Çegerek, who went on pregnancy leave. His temporary term lasted from 3 September until 11 December 2013.

He returned to the House of Representatives on 10 September 2014 when he succeeded Mariëtte Hamer who became chair of the Social-Economic Council. His term in the House ended on 23 March 2017.
