= List of rectores magnifici of the Erasmus University Rotterdam =

A rector of a Dutch university is called a rector magnificus. The following people have been rector magnificus of the Erasmus University Rotterdam:

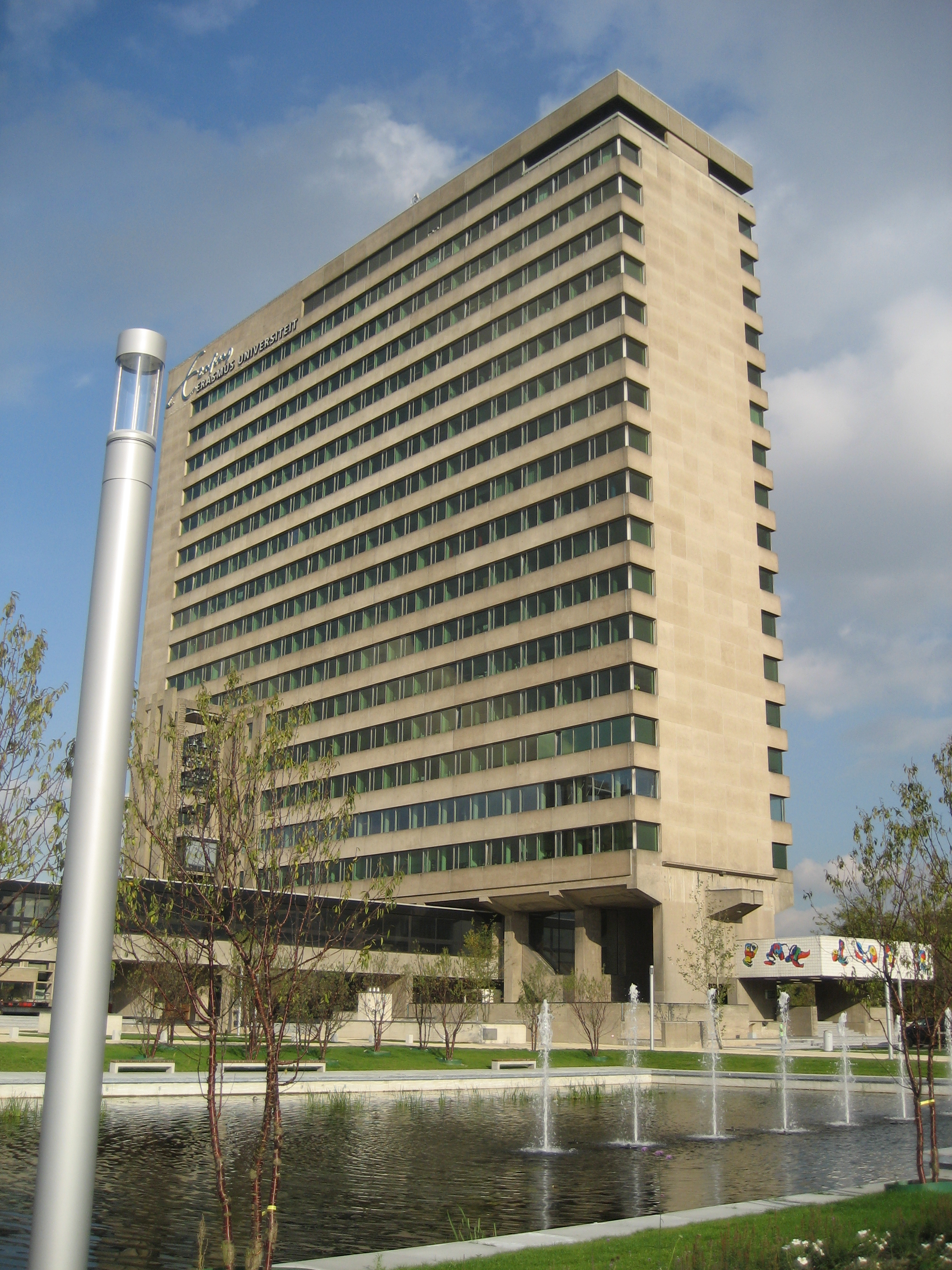
Erasmus Universiteit Rotterdam

Period	Rector magnificus	Image
1913 – 1918	Gijsbert Weijer Jan Bruins	
1918 – 1919	Nicolaas Posthumus	
1919 – 1920	Johannes Godfried de Jongh	
1920 – 1921	Willem Hendrik Drucker	
1921 – 1922	François de Vries	
1922 – 1923	Hendrik Rudolph Ribbius	
1923 – 1924	Pieter Eduard Verkade	
1924 – 1925	Nico Jacob Polak	
1925 – 1926	Zeger Willem Sneller	
1926 – 1927	Willem Boerman	
1927 – 1928	Willem Hendrik Drucker	
1928 – 1929	François de Vries	
1929 – 1930	Hendrik Rudolph Ribbius	
1930 – 1931	Pieter Eduard Verkade	
1931 – 1932	Nico Jacob Polak	
1932 – 1933	Zeger Willem Sneller	
1933 – 1934	Willem Boerman	
1934 – 1935	Carl Wilhelm de Vries	
1935 – 1936	François de Vries	
1936 – 1937	Pieter Eduard Verkade	
1937 – 1938	Nico Jacob Polak	
1938 – 1939	Zeger Willem Sneller	
1939 – 1940	Willem Boerman	
1940 – 1943	George Gonggrijp	
1943 – 1944	Johan Frederik ten Doesschate	
1944 – 1945	George Gonggrijp	
1945 – 1947	Carl Wilhelm de Vries	
1947 – 1949	Ph.A.N. Houwing	
1949 – 1950	Christiaan Glasz	
1950 – 1951	Henk Lambers	
1951 – 1952	Johan Witteveen	
1952 – 1953	Johannes Herman Kernkamp	
1953 – 1954	Bernard Schendstok	
1954 – 1955	Barend Pruijt	
1955 – 1956	Willem Boerman	
1956 – 1957	Jan Wisselink	
1957 – 1958	Christiaan Glasz	
1958 – 1959	Henk Lambers	
1959 – 1960	Johannes Hermanus van Stuijvenberg	
1960 – 1964	Henk Lambers	
1964 – 1965	Hein Kuhlmeijer	
1965 – 1966	Tammo Jacob Bezemer	
1966 – 1967	Roelof Burgert	
1967 – 1968	Arend Isaac Diepenhorst	
1968 – 1970	Wiek Slagter	
1970 – 1971	Henk Lambers	
1971 – 1974	Carel van der Weijden	
1974 – 1975	Peter Klein	
1975 – 1979	Bart Leijnse	
1979 – 1983	Jan Sperna Weiland	
1983 – 1986	M.W. van Hof	
1986 – 1989	Alexander Rinnooy Kan	
1989 – 1993	Cornelis Johannes Rijnvos	
1993 – 2000	Piet Akkermans	
2000 – 2003	Jan van Bemmel	
2004 – 2009	Steven Lamberts	
2009 – 2013	Henk Schmidt	
2013 – 2018	Huibert Pols	
2018 – 2020	Rutger Engels	
2021	Frank van der Duyn Schouten (acting)	
2021 – 2024	Annelien Bredenoord	
2024 – present	Jantine Schuit	
