= Wiebe Draijer =

Dutch engineer and businessman (born 1965)

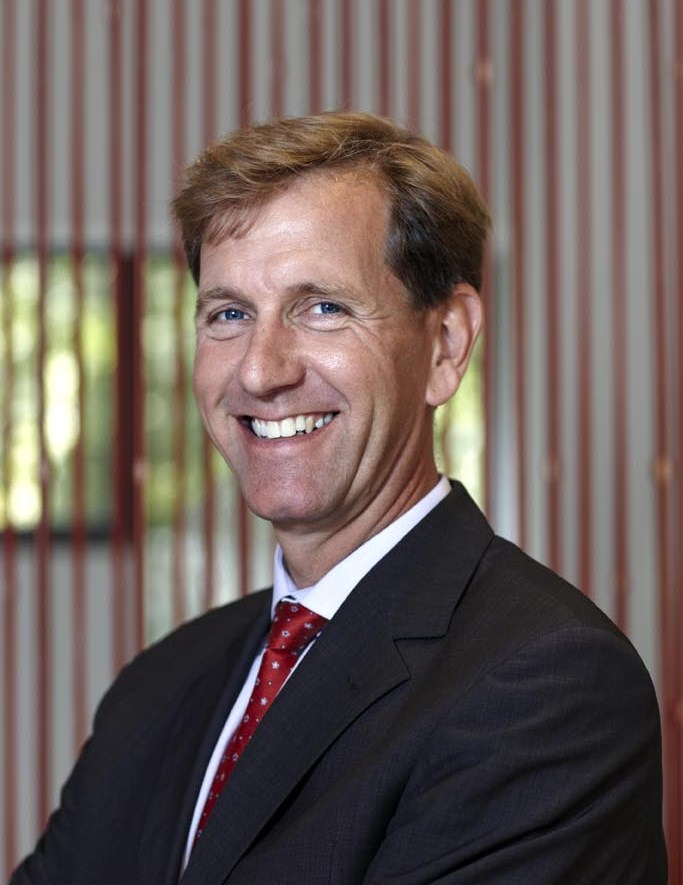

Chairman of the Social and Economic Council
- In office 1 September 2012 – 10 September 2014
- Preceded by: Alexander Rinnooy Kan
- Succeeded by: Mariëtte Hamer

Personal details
- Born: 27 August 1965 (age 61) Enschede, Netherlands
- Party: Independent
- Education: INSEAD
- Occupation: Engineer, civil servant

Wiebe Draijer (born 27 August 1965) is a Dutch engineer, civil servant and management consultant who served as Chairman of the Social and Economic Council from 2012 to 2014. Since 1 October 2014, he has been CEO of the Rabobank.

== Youth and education ==
Born and growing up in Enschede, Draijer wanted to be a reporter, but an uncle advised him to complete a professional study before trying his hand at journalism. Following this advice Draijer studied mechanical engineering at the Delft University of Technology from 1983 to 1989. During his time as a student he also worked as a freelance reporter for NRC Handelsblad. From 1987 to 1989 he completed a traineeship and a year as a researcher at Philips Research Laboratories.

== Career ==
=== McKinsey & Company ===
Having completed his university education, he joined McKinsey & Company as a fellow. Augmenting his earlier education with an MBA at INSEAD in Fontainebleau, he was promoted to country managing partner for the Netherlands in 2004 and for the Benelux in 2006.

During his career at McKinsey, Draijer held several highly visible positions in Dutch society. Among others he was Chairman of the Stichting Toekomstbeeld der Techniek (of which he is still a member of the board), member of the supervisory board of the Kröller-Müller Museum, member of the advisory board for Champs on Stage (an organisation focusing on reducing high school dropout), member of the advisory board for World Press Photo, member of the Innovatieplatform (a government advisory board to stimulate the Dutch knowledge economy) and member of the Education Innovation Network. He was also a founding member of 21minuten.nl (now De Nationale Dialoog), a website focused on generating public debate on political issues as well as more active citizenship.

=== Social Economic Council ===
On 19 June 2012 Henk Kamp, Minister of Social Affairs and Employment, nominated Draijer to succeed Alexander Rinnooy Kan as Chairman of the Social and Economic Council (SER) per 1 September 2012. The SER endorsed the nomination on 21 June 2012; his appointment was validated by Queen Beatrix of the Netherlands in July. On 1 July 2014 Draijer left the SER and started to work for the Rabobank. On 10 September 2014 he was succeeded by Mariëtte Hamer.

=== Rabobank ===
He was appointed Chairman of the Managing Board of Rabobank on 1 October 2014. He is also a member of the Board of the Dutch Banking Association and a member of the Board of the European Association of Cooperative Banks (EACB).
