= Social partners =

Collaboration between two or more groups

Social partners are groups that cooperate in working relationships to achieve a mutually agreed-upon goal, typically for some benefit of all involved groups. Examples of social partners include employers, employees, trade unions, corporate groups, and governments.

== Origin ==
The concept of social partners arose in Europe in part from the disorder following the Industrial Revolution. Article 152 of the Treaty on the Functioning of the European Union (TFEU) states:

The Union recognizes and promotes the role of the social partners at its level, taking into account the diversity of national systems. It shall facilitate dialog between the social partners, respecting their autonomy. The Tripartite Social Summit for Growth and Employment shall contribute to social dialog.

This article forms part of the Primary Law of the European Union (EU).

== Role of social partners ==
Social partners have a vital role to play in reaching out to workers and owners of enterprises and in particular those of Small and medium-sized enterprises (SMEs) and the informal economy, and in general, increasing the representation of their membership to ensure deeper and broader benefits of association, representation and leadership, including in the field of public policy advocacy, its formulation and implementation.

== Process ==
With continuing globalization companies must bear more pressure from competition among countries. At the same time, new technologies are replacing traditional industries causing structural unemployment. Relationships between employees and employers are stressed as various forms of atypical employment become mainstream in the employment market. Under these circumstances, the relationship between labor and employer has growing potential to acquire partnership qualities. This new idea of social partners has taken shape through the International Labor Organization (ILO1) and European social partnership systems. In Europe social partnerships helped rebuild the economy after the damage inflicted by World War II.

There is an inextricable connection between social partners, social dialog, and peace, but what makes for successful social dialog?

1. Powerful and independent organizations of labor and capital (social relation / factor of production)
2. Both employee and employer have the willingness to talk on equal footing
3. Respecting freedom of association and collective bargaining rights
4. Appropriate institutional support

== Influence ==
The Treaty of Lisbon (Article 152 of the Treaty on the Functioning of the EU) recognises the role of the social partners in labor relations and European social dialog. They represent their members during consultations with the commission and the negotiation of collective agreements. They also sit with the European Economic and Social Committee, alongside other organisations representing civil society. The social partners played a key role in implementing the objectives of the Lisbon Strategy for growth and jobs by launching projects and initiatives at the European and national levels.

European social partners have had a considerable influence on the preparation of the following Commission proposals:

- Revamping the rules to protect EU workers from harmful electromagnetic fields;
- The new framework Directive on the establishment of the European Works Councils;
- The Directive implementing the revised Framework Agreement on parental leave;
- The recommendation on a smoke-free environment

== Examples ==
=== Poland ===
The role of governments and social partners in keeping older workers in the labor market. In view of Poland's ranking as lowest in the EU professional activity indicators for people aged 45+, the government and social partners see the need for actions boosting occupational development of this group. Poland has a universal plan called ‘Generations’ Solidarity: Actions for Increasing Occupational Activity of People Aged 50+’, developed within the social dialog institutions. So far it has been implemented through legislation, most importantly with regard to the pension system, and specifically raising and equalising the statutory retirement age for men and women and restricting access to early retirement schemes. Very few actions revolve around improving the quality of work of older workers.

=== Korea ===
Labor Foundation, which was founded in April 2007 under the tripartite consensus on the importance of social partners' autonomous contribution to a more stable and advanced labor relations, is the one and only public institution that is engaged in the programs and activities to promote the labor relations in Korea. The programs and activities of the Foundation, which are all designed to help and guide social partners to work together with responsibility and for their common benefits, include: financial assistance for social partnership education and joint programs; workplace innovation consulting to increase competitiveness at workplace; employment generation, by creating selective worktime jobs, improving the long work practice and promoting flexible work schemes; outplacement services for retirees in their 40s or older; counseling and education to prevent and remedy unreasonable discrimination in employment; and international exchanges in the field of labor relations.

== See also ==
- Labor unions in the United States
- Right-to-work law
- Right to Work laws in the UK
