= Jan van Bemmel =

Dutch university professor

Jan Hendrik van Bemmel
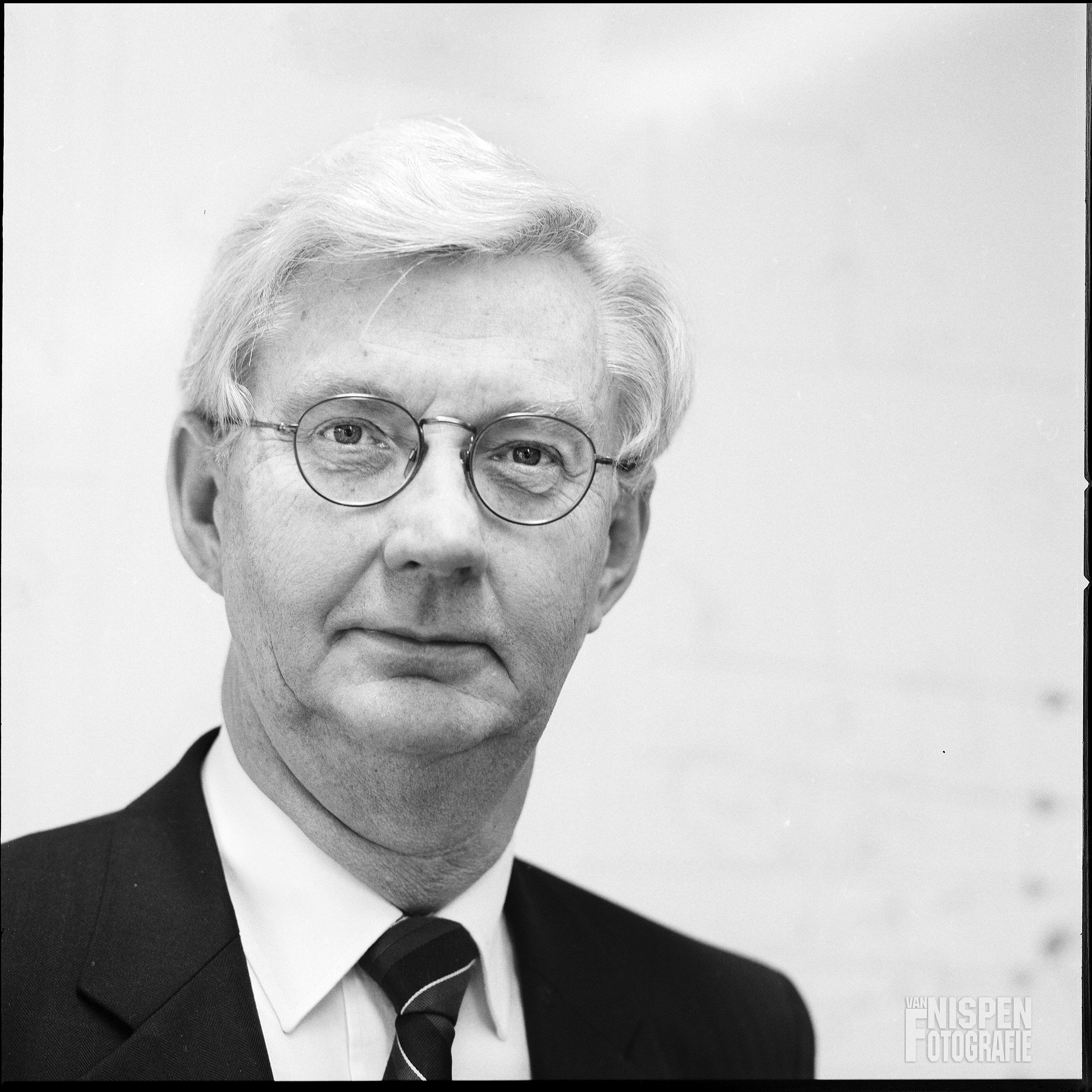
- Jan van Bemmel (2003)
- Born: 17 November 1938 (age 87); Rotterdam, the Netherlands
- Occupation(s): professor of medical informatics at the Vrije Universiteit Amsterdam and the Erasmus University Rotterdam
- Known for: member of the Royal Netherlands Academy of Arts and Sciences, corresponding member of the National Academy of Medicine

Jan Hendrik van Bemmel (born 17 November 1938) is a Dutch former professor of medical informatics at the Vrije Universiteit Amsterdam and the Erasmus University Rotterdam. He was rector magnificus of the Erasmus University Rotterdam between 2000 and 2003.

== Career ==
Van Bemmel was born in Rotterdam on 17 November 1938. He studied physics at Delft University of Technology, where he obtained a degree in 1963. He subsequently started working for the Medical-Physical Institute of the Netherlands Organisation for Applied Scientific Research (TNO). At the institute he was head of the workgroup of biomedical signalanalysis. Six years later he earned his Doctor title at the faculty of physics and mathematics of the Radboud University Nijmegen. His thesis concerned challenges of signal processing applied to fetal electrocardiography.

In 1973 Van Bemmel stopped working for TNO and was appointed as professor of medical informatics at the Vrije Universiteit Amsterdam. In 1987 Van Bemmel became professor of medical informatics at the Erasmus University Rotterdam. He served as rector magnificus of the University between 2000 and 2003.

His research has amongst other topics focused on biomedical signal and image analysis, medical information systems and electronic health records. He started his work on the latter during the 1980s and later expanded into the signal and image analytics. The American Medical Informatics Association (AMIA) has called him "instrumental in the development of medical informatics as a discipline". He served as president of the International Medical Informatics Association from 1998 to 2001.

Van Bemmel was elected a member of the Royal Netherlands Academy of Arts and Sciences in 1987. He became a corresponding member of the National Academy of Medicine in 1991. In 2015 he won the Morris F. Collen Award of the AMIA. In 2018 a paper in honour of his 80th birthday was published in which Van Bemmel's earlier work was held to the then current scientific state of knowledge.

In 2017 Van Bemmel published a book named "Waar was je? Geloven na Darwin en Hubble", describing his views on Christian beliefs and evolution theory.
