= Yasemin Cegerek =

Dutch politician (born 1977)

Yasemin Çegerek
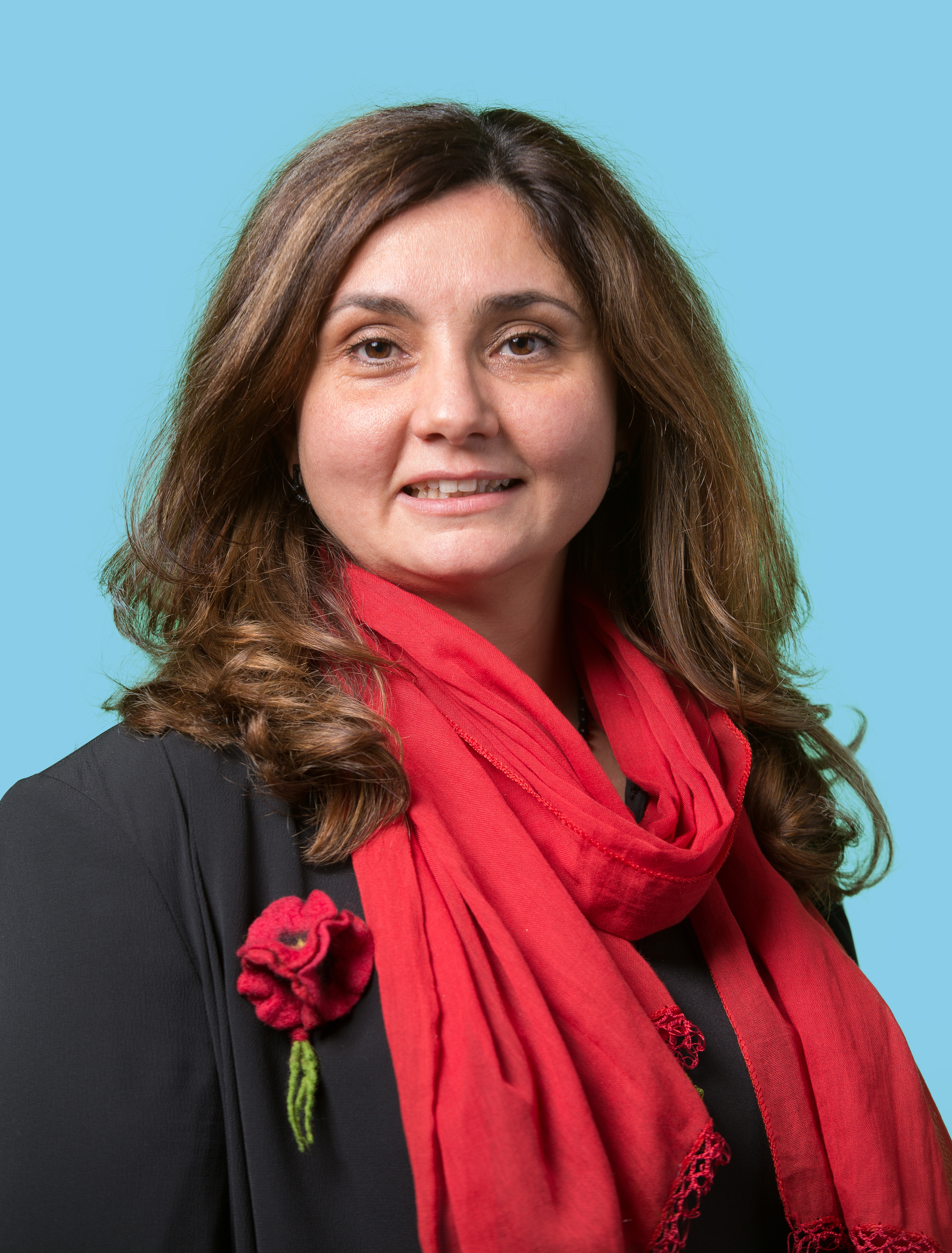
- Çegerek in 2011.

Member of the House of Representatives
- In office 18 June 2013 – 23 March 2017

Personal details
- Born: 10 November 1977 (age 48) Apeldoorn, Netherlands
- Party: Labour Party

Yasemin Çegerek (born 10 November 1977) is a Dutch politician of Turkish descent. She was an MP for the Labour Party between 18 June 2013 and 23 March 2017. She replaced Désirée Bonis, who left the House of Representatives on 13 June 2013. Çegerek was a member of the commissions of foreign affairs, defense, European affairs, Kingdom relations, foreign trade and development aid. Çegerek temporarily went on maternity leave and her designated replacement was Marith Rebel-Volp. However, as House of Representatives member Myrthe Hilkens left the House on 28 August 2013, Rebel-Volp permanently replaced her instead. Henk Leenders was named as the replacement for Çegerek.

Between 2002 and 2006 Çegerek served as a municipal councillor in Enschede. And since 2007 she has been a member of the Provincial Council of Gelderland. Çegerek studied public administration at the University of Twente.

Çegerek's time in the House ended on 23 March 2017. Since 22 May 2018 she has been alderman in Heerde.
