= Alexander Rinnooy Kan =

Dutch politician (born 1949)

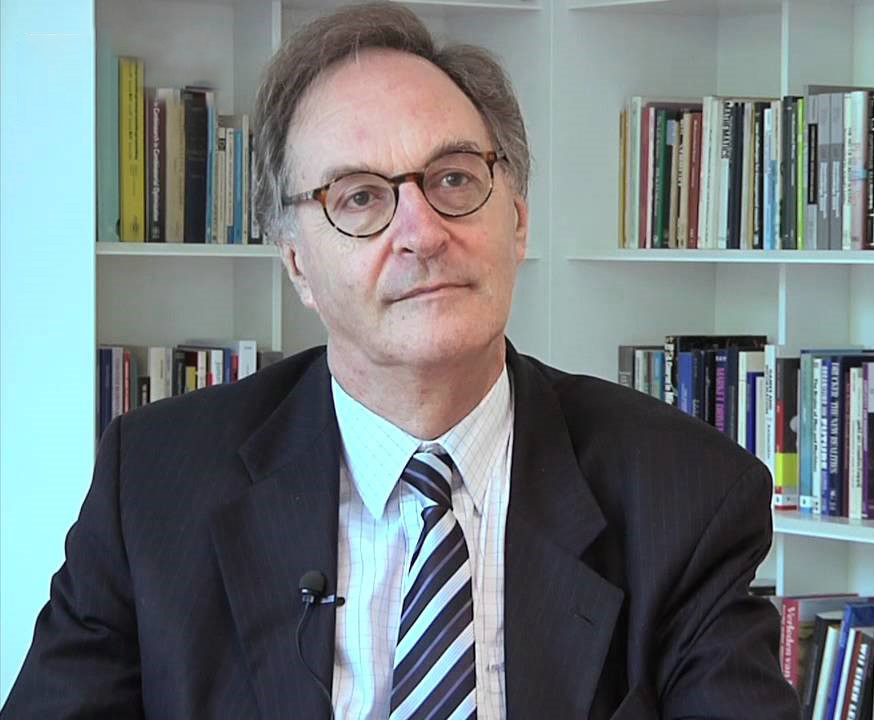
- Rinnooy Kan in 2011

Member of the Senate
- In office 9 June 2015 – 11 June 2019

Chairman of the Social and Economic Council
- In office 1 April 2006 – 1 September 2012
- Preceded by: Herman Wijffels
- Succeeded by: Wiebe Draijer

Member of the Social and Economic Council
- In office 1 January 1991 – 1 August 1996
- Chairman: Theo Quené; Klaas de Vries

Personal details
- Born: Alexander Hendrik George Rinnooy Kan; 5 October 1949 (age 76) Scheveningen, Netherlands
- Party: Democrats 66 (since 1980)
- Education: University of Amsterdam (BSc, PhD); Leiden University (MSc)
- Occupation: Politician · Civil servant · Economist · Mathematician · Researcher · Businessman · Corporate director · Nonprofit director · Academic administrator · Trade association executive · Author · Professor

Alexander Hendrik George Rinnooy Kan (born 5 October 1949) is a Dutch politician, businessman and mathematician who served as Chairman of the Social and Economic Council from 2006 to 2012. A member of the Democrats 66 (D66) party, he was a member of the Senate from 2015 to 2019. From September 2012 until October 2019, he was University Professor of Economics and Business at the University of Amsterdam, where he is now professor emeritus.

He has also been president of the supervisory board of EYE Film Institute Netherlands since 2008 and of Museum Boerhaave since 2018.

== Biography ==
=== Early life and education ===
Rinnooy Kan grew up in The Hague. He graduated with a doctorandus degree (eq. to MSc) in mathematics at Leiden University in 1972. The same year, he also obtained a candidate degree (eq. to BSc) in econometrics from the University of Amsterdam. In 1972–1973, he worked as a mathematician at Spectrum Encyclopedia. From 1973 until 1977, he was a scientific employee in the Department of Mathematics and Statistics at Delft University of Technology (then called the Delft Technical College). In 1976, he obtained a PhD in mathematics at the University of Amsterdam; he was advised by Gijsbert de Leve.

=== Private career ===
In 1977, he went to the Erasmus University Rotterdam, where he became a full Professor in Operations Research in 1980 at the age of 30. In 1983, he was appointed head of the Econometric Institute and in 1986 rector magnificus of the university. In the meantime, he was visiting professor at the University of California, Berkeley and MIT, among others.

From 1991 until 1996, he was president of the employers federation VNO and (after the merger with NCW) of the VNO-NCW. Between 1996 and 2006, Rinnooy Kan was a member of the board of directors of ING Group, where he was responsible for the Asian branch. He was a member of the Netherlands Innovation Platform until the platform was dissolved in 2010.

=== Social Economic Council ===
From 2006 until 2012, he was a crown-appointed member and Chairman of the Social and Economic Council (SER). He was succeeded in this position by Wiebe Draijer. During his farewell party at the SER he was appointed Commander in the Order of the Netherlands Lion. The Dutch newspaper de Volkskrant named him the most influential person in the Netherlands in 2007, 2008 and 2009.

=== Senate ===
On 9 June 2015, he became a member of the Senate on behalf of the Democrats 66 party. He did not seek reelection to the upper chamber in 2019; his term ended on 11 June 2019.

== Publications ==
=== Books ===
- 1985 The Traveling Salesman Problem: A Guided Tour of Combinatorial Optimization. With Eugene L. Lawler, Jan Karel Lenstra, and David B. Shmoys. John Wiley & Sons, New York, NY.
- 1993, Handbooks in Operations Research and Management Science, Vol. 4: Logistics of Production and Inventory. with Stephen C. Graves, and Paul Herbert Zipkin, eds.

=== Selected articles ===
- Byrd, R. H., Dert, C. L., Rinnooy Kan, A. H. G., & Schnabel, R. B. (1990). "Concurrent Stochastic Methods for Global Optimization". Mathematical Programming, 46(1-3), 1-29.
- Lenstra, A. K., A. H. G. Rinnooy Kan, and Alexander Schrijver. "History of Mathematical Programming: A Collection of Personal Reminiscences." (1991).
- Bastian, Cock, and Alexander H. G. Rinnooy Kan. "The Stochastic Vehicle Routing Problem Revisited." European Journal of Operational Research 56.3 (1992): 407–412.
- Flippo, O. E., & Rinnooy Kan, A. H. G. (1993). "Decomposition in General Mathematical Programming". Mathematical Programming, 60(1-3), 361–382.
- Lawler, Eugene L., J. K. Lenstra, A. H. G. Rinnooy Kan, and D.B. Shmoys . "Sequencing and Scheduling: Algorithms and Complexity." Handbooks in Operations Research and Management Science 4 (1993): 445–522.

== Decorations ==
Honours
| Ribbon bar | Honour | Country | Date |
| | Commander of the Order of the Netherlands Lion | Netherlands | 1 September 2012 |
| | Honorary Knight Commander of the Order of the British Empire | United Kingdom | 2018 |

Civic offices
| Preceded by Herman Wijffels | Chairman of the Social and Economic Council; 2006–2012 | Succeeded by Wiebe Draijer |
| Preceded by Fokko van Duyne | Chairman of the Supervisory board of the Central Bank of the Netherlands; 2012–2015 | Succeeded by Wim Kuijken |
Business positions
| Preceded by Koos Andriessen | Chairman of the Industry and Employers confederation 1991–1996 | Succeeded by Hans Blankert |
Non-profit organization positions
| Preceded by | Chairman of the Concertgebouw Foundation; 2003–2015 | Succeeded by Hans Wijers |
| Preceded by | Chairman of the EYE Film Institute; Netherlands; 2008–present | Incumbent |
| Preceded by Douwe Breimer | Chairman of Museum Boerhaave; 2018–present | Incumbent |
Academic offices
| Preceded by Ries van Hof | Rector Magnificus of the Erasmus University Rotterdam; 1986–1989 | Succeeded by Kees Rijnvos |
