= VNO-NCW =

Dutch employers' federation

VNO-NCW (Confederation of Netherlands Industry and Employers)
- Founder: Founded in 1996
- Type: Employers' federation
- Purpose: Advocacy for employers and businesses
- Location: Netherlands
- Method: Policy advocacy, labor relations, education
- Members: 115,000 companies (160 branch organizations)
- Affiliations: VNO-NCW North, VNO-NCW West, Employers' Association of Brabant and Zeeland, Employers' Association of Limburg
- Website: VNO-NCW Official Website

VNO-NCW (known in English as the "Confederation of Netherlands Industry and Employers") is a Dutch employers' federation founded in 1996 as a merger of the Christian-democratic Nederlands Christelijk Werkgeversverbond (NCW), which was founded as fusion of the Protestant PCW and the Catholic NKW, and the liberal Verbond van Nederlandse Ondernemingen (VNO). Both organizations had strong ties with the Protestant and liberal pillar, respectively.

The federation chose not to adopt a new name, but instead use the well-known acronyms of its constituent organizations.

== Activities ==
The most important function of VNO-NCW is the CAO-talks, over wages and secondary working conditions, it holds with the trade unions. It also advises government via the Social Economic Council in which other employers' organizations, trade unions, and government-appointed experts also have seats.

== List of chairmen of the Christian Employers' association ==
Chairman of the Christian Employers' association (NCW)		Term of office	Party
Steef van Eijkelenburg	Steef van Eijkelenburg (1922–2009)	1 January 1979 – 1 January 1988	Christian Democratic Appeal
Koos Andriessen	Dr. Koos Andriessen (1928–2019)	1 January 1988 – 7 November 1989	Christian Democratic Appeal
Onno Ruding	Dr. Onno Ruding (born 1939)	1 January 1990 – 21 March 1992	Christian Democratic Appeal
	Hans Blankert (born 1940)	20 August 1992 – 31 December 1996	Independent

== List of chairmen of the Industry and Employers' association ==
Chairman of the Industry and Employers' association (VNO)		Term of office	Party
Chris van Veen	Chris van Veen (1922–2009)	1 January 1974 – 1 November 1984	Christian Historical Union
Kees van Lede	Kees van Lede (born 1942)	1 January 1985 – 1 January 1991	Independent
Alexander Rinnooy Kan	Dr. Alexander Rinnooy Kan (born 1949)	1 January 1991 – 31 December 1996	Democrats 66

== List of chairmen of the Industry and Employers confederation ==
Chairman of the Industry and Employers confederation (VNO–NCW)		Term of office	Party
	Hans Blankert (born 1940)	1 January 1997 – 1 July 1999	Independent
	Jacques Schraven (born 1942)	1 July 1999 – 1 July 2005	Independent
Bernard Wientjes	Bernard Wientjes (born 1943)	1 July 2005 – 1 July 2014	Independent
Hans de Boer	Dr. Hans de Boer (1955-2021)	1 July 2014 – 2021	CDA
Ingrid Thijssen	Dr. Ingrid Thijssen (born 1968)	September 2020-March 2026	D66
Coen van Oostrom	Coen van Oostrom (born 1970)	March 2026	VVD

== Organization ==
VNO-NCW is the national employers' federation, it has 160 branch organizations as members, these organize 115,000 companies. This includes 80% of the smaller corporations and nearly all larger businesses.

The VNO-NCW has got a General Board and Board. The general board meets six times a year, and sets the general policy. The Board manages the daily operation of VNO-NCW. The current chair is Bernard Wientjes. The last chairs of the organization have been member of either the liberal VVD or the Christian-democratic CDA.

Several formally independent regional employers' associations, VNO-NCW North, VNO-NCW West, the Employers' Association of Brabant and Zeeland, and the Employers' Association of Limburg, cooperate with VNO-NCW.

The organization publishes Forum, its own magazine. AWVN is an advisory organization linked to VNO-NCW specialized in labour relations. De Baak is an educative institution for leadership, entrepreneurship and professionals who seek for inspiration, personal development, knowledge, and insights. Evolved from the largest employer’s organization in the Netherlands (the VNO-NCW – also known as "the voice" of Dutch business).
