= Mariëtte Hamer =

Dutch politician and trade union leader

Her Excellency Mariëtte Hamer
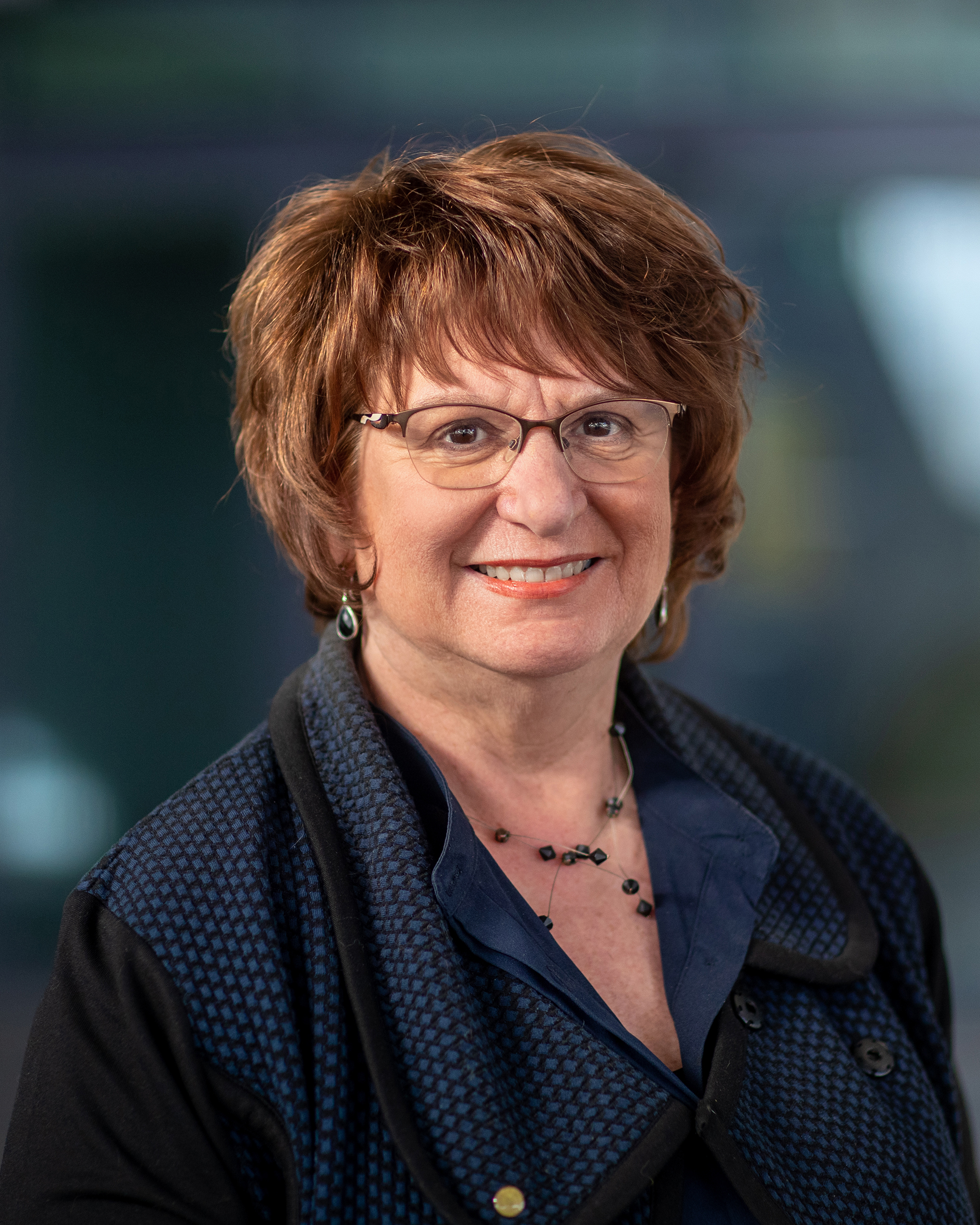

Chairwoman of the Social and Economic Council
- In office 10 September 2014 – 1 April 2022
- Preceded by: Wiebe Draijer
- Succeeded by: Kim Putters

Leader of the Labour Party in the House of Representatives
- In office 22 January 2008 – 17 June 2010
- Preceded by: Jacques Tichelaar
- Succeeded by: Job Cohen

Chairwoman of the Labour Party
- In office 5 September 2000 – 16 March 2001; Ad interim
- Leader: Wim Kok
- Preceded by: Marijke van Hees
- Succeeded by: Ruud Koole

Member of the House of Representatives
- In office 19 May 1998 – 10 September 2014

Personal details
- Born: Mariëtte Iris Hamer; 7 June 1958 (age 68) Amsterdam, Netherlands
- Party: Labour Party (since 1984)
- Education: University of Amsterdam (Bachelor of Arts, Master of Arts)
- Occupation: Politician · Civil servant · Trade Union leader · Teacher · Activist

Mariëtte Iris Hamer (born 7 June 1958) is a Dutch politician and trade union leader serving as commissioner for combating inappropriate behavior and sexual violence since 2022. A member of the Labour Party (PvdA), she was its leader in the House of Representatives from 2008 to 2010.

== Education and private career ==
A native of Amsterdam, Hamer studied linguistics at the University of Amsterdam. She is a co-founder and was chairwoman of the Dutch Student Union (LSVb); she later worked as an educator and at the Ministry of Education, Culture and Science.

== Political career ==
=== House of Representatives ===
Hamer served as a member of the House of Representatives from 19 May 1998 and 10 September 2014. From 22 January 2008 to 17 June 2010 she was parliamentary leader; she was succeeded by former Amsterdam Mayor and party leader Job Cohen, who had just been elected to the House of Representatives. She focused on matters of labour economics, day care and emancipation. In the past she also focused on matters of education, social affairs. Hamer also was party chair in an interim capacity from 5 September 2000 until 16 March 2001.

=== Social and Economic Council ===
Since 10 September 2014 Hamer has been a Crown-appointed member and Chairwoman of the Social and Economic Council (SER). She was nominated to the position by Lodewijk Asscher, Minister of Social Affairs and Employment; King Willem-Alexander of the Netherlands validated the appointment. She succeeded Wiebe Draijer, who resigned from office following his appointment as CEO of the Rabobank. In the House of Representatives Hamer was succeeded by Henk Leenders.

In 2022, Hamer was appointed by the government of Prime Minister Mark Rutte as commissioner for combating inappropriate behavior and sexual violence, a new role in which she is tasked with coming up with a plan to tackle sexually inappropriate behavior and sexual violence. At the request of Minister of Education Robbert Dijkgraaf, she investigated how such behavior could be mitigated at institutions of higher education. Hamer concluded they should step up their efforts, saying the behavior is particularly prevalent at those ages. She recommended colleges and universities to provide mandatory sex education, to hire ombudsmen, and to better inspect student associations.

Party political offices
Preceded by Marijke van Hees	Chairwoman of the Labour Party; Ad interim 2000–2001	Succeeded by Ruud Koole
Preceded by Jacques Tichelaar	Parliamentary leader of the Labour Party in the House of Representatives; 2008–2010	Succeeded by Job Cohen
Civic offices
Preceded by Wiebe Draijer	Chairwoman of the Social and Economic Council; 2014–present	Incumbent
Non-profit organization positions
Preceded by Office established	Chairwoman of the Dutch Student Union; 1983–1984	Succeeded by Robert Giesberts
