= Annelien Bredenoord =

Dutch politician

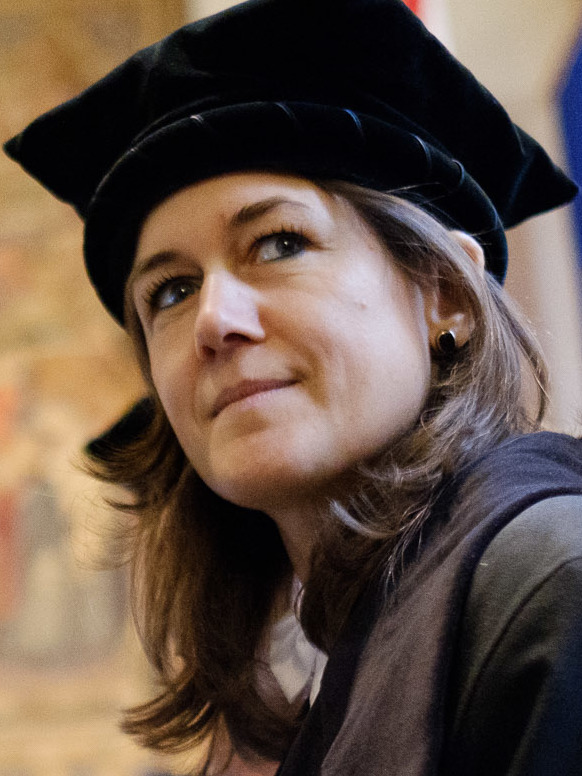
- Bredenoord in 2018

Parliamentary leader in the Senate
- Incumbent
- Assumed office 11 June 2019
- Preceded by: Hans Engels
- Parliamentary group: Democrats 66

Member of the Senate
- Incumbent
- Assumed office 22 January 2019
- In office 9 June 2015 – 3 October 2018
- Parliamentary group: Democrats 66

Personal details
- Born: Anne Lydia Bredenoord; 1 August 1979 (age 47) Utrecht, Netherlands
- Party: Democrats 66
- Education: Leiden University; Maastricht University
- Occupation: Professor, politician, rector
- Website: annelienbredenoord.nl

Anne Lydia "Annelien" Bredenoord (Dutch pronunciation: [ˈɑnə ˈlidijaː ˌʔɑnəˈlim ˈbreːdəˌnoːrt]; born 1 August 1979) is a Dutch politician and professor of biomedical ethics. She is the current president of the board of directors of Erasmus University Rotterdam, having previously served as rector (2021–2024). Since 2019, she serves as the parliamentary leader of Democrats 66 (D66) in the Senate.

== Early life and education ==
Bredenoord studied theology and political science at Leiden University and obtained her PhD in medical ethics at Maastricht University.

== Career ==
Since 9 June 2015, Bredenoord has been serving a member of the Senate for D66. In February 2017, she was appointed as professor of biomedical ethics at the University Medical Center Utrecht. Since 11 June 2019, she serves as the parliamentary leader of D66 in the Senate.

On 1 October 2021, Bredenoord became the first female rector magnificus of the Erasmus University Rotterdam. On 1 November 2024, Jantine Schuit succeeded her as rector, while Bredenoord moved to the position of president of the board. Together with vice-president Ellen van Schoten, they constituted the first all-female board of directors at a Dutch university in history.

Since 2023, Bredenoord has been a member of an expert group entrusted to support the interim evaluation of the European Union's Horizon Europe programme, chaired by Manuel Heitor.

In 2022 she was elected member of the Royal Netherlands Academy of Arts and Sciences.
