= Social dialogue =

Process whereby social partners negotiate to influence economic policies

Social dialogue (or social concertation) is the process whereby social partners (trade unions and employer organisations) negotiate, often in collaboration with the government, to influence the arrangement and development of work-related issues, labour market policies, social protection, taxation or other economic policies. Social dialogue aims to advance opportunities for women and men to obtain decent and productive work in conditions of freedom, equality, security and human dignity.

It is a widespread procedure to develop public policies in Western Europe.

Social dialogue can be direct relations between the social partners themselves ("bipartite") or relations between governmental authorities and the social partners ("tripartite"). Social dialogue can include negotiation, consultation or simply an exchange of views. Social dialogue enables organizations to manage change and achieve economic and social goals.

Examples of social dialogue activity include mutual information, open discussion, concertation (on-going tripartite dialogue), exchange of opinions, consultation and negotiation (agreements /common opinions).

European social dialogue is enshrined in the Treaty establishing the European Community (articles 138 and 139; e.g. 118a and 118b) and is promoted by the European Commission.

== Tripartism ==
According to the International Labor Organization, the practice of tripartism between governments and the representative organizations of workers and employers is now more relevant to achieving solutions and to building up social cohesion and the rule of law through, among other means, international labor standards.

== Enabling conditions ==
Social dialogue requires the proper conditions to achieve its goals:

1. Respect for the fundamental rights of freedom of association and collective bargaining.
2. Strong, independent workers' and employers' organizations with the technical capacity and knowledge required to participate in social dialogue.
3. Political will and commitment to engage in social dialogue on the part of all parties.
4. Appropriate institutional support.

== Means ==
- Information sharing: The foundation of effective social dialogue is willingness to share information.
- Consultation: Consultation involves exchanging perspective, opinion, ideas, and forms a deep conversation.
- Negotiation/Conclude convention: Some members need to be authorized to form the binding conventions.
- Collective bargaining: Collective bargaining is the ultimate tool in social dialogue. Collective bargaining success measure the level of social dialogue.

== National efforts ==
Social dialogue may take place at different levels and in various form, depending on national circumstances.

=== Croatia ===
In Croatia, the government and social partners could not reach consensus on adoption to address an economic crisis.

=== France ===
Social dialogue struggled in France because of the political differences among social partners. Except for collective bargaining, it highlighted the discussion in tripartism on the issues of employment policy and human resource development. An employment committee in France attempted consultation and participation on the issues of promoting employment and job training.

=== Germany ===
The sophistication of unions and employers' groups in Germany, and fewer political and ideological conflicts, enabled social dialogue to have greater success. Except for job training and employment security, it emphasized bargaining and negotiation in work conditions.

=== Austria, Denmark, Ireland and the Netherlands ===
The European Union (EU) suffered from high unemployment in the 1990s. In 2001 the unemployment rate of 15 countries was up to 7.4 percent. However, the unemployment rate in Austria, Denmark, Ireland, and the Netherlands was only 3.5 percent. ILO concluded that the main reason of these four countries' success was social dialogue, along with macroeconomic policies and labor market policies. For instance, the Netherlands' 1982 Wassenaar Agreement and Denmark's push for the national recovery program with Ireland in 1987.

== See also ==
- Intercultural dialogue
