= D66 =

D66 may refer to:

- Delta Junction Airport, a public airport in Alaska with FAA code D66
- d66 (die), a dice roll used in some role-playing games and old wargames
- D66 road (Croatia), a state road in Croatia
- Democrats 66, commonly known as D66, a political party in the Netherlands
- HMS Emerald (D66), an Emerald-class light cruiser
- D66 strain of Chlamydomonas reinhardtii
- Queen's Gambit Declined, Encyclopedia of Chess Openings code
