= Geert ten Dam =

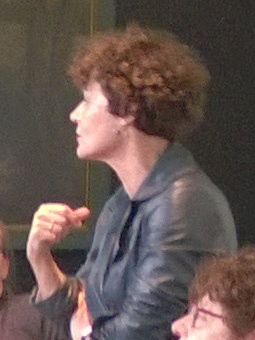

President of University of Amsterdam
- Incumbent
- Assumed office 2016

Personal details
- Occupation: Academic

Geert ten Dam (born Eindhoven, 6 November 1958) is a Dutch scientist. She was president of the Board of the University of Amsterdam from 2016 till 2024.

== Education ==
- Major – Andragogy
- Degree – Doctorate
- Exam level – promotion
- Education- Faculty of Behavioral and Social Sciences at the University of Groningen
- Thesis – "Women Differ in Adult Education: Gender, Ethnicity, and Age in an Ideological-Theoretical Approach to Dropout."

== Roles ==
- Distinguished Research Professor of Citizenship Education at the Faculty of Social and Behavioral Sciences of the University of Amsterdam
- President of the executive board of the University of Amsterdam from 2011 to 2024
- Crown member of the Social Economic Council (SER)
- Until the end of 2014, Ten Dam was chair of the Education Council of the Netherlands
- Full professor of education at the University of Amsterdam

== Awards ==
- Frans Banninck Cocq Medal – This municipal award is awarded to people who have made an exceptional contribution to the city of Amsterdam.

== Publications ==
Geert ten Dam has published over 100 books and articles. Geert ten Dam in her most recent articles has been studying the concern that exist with young citizens in their democratic value. Some of her most recent articles include:

- Mulder, L. E. M., Thijs, P. E., Wanders, F. H. K., van den Berg, B., la Roi, C., Mennes, H. I., van Alebeek, C. R. A., van Slageren, J., van der Meer, T. W. G., van de Werfhorst, H. G., & ten Dam, G. T. M. (2024). Jongeren over democratische waarden. Beleid & Maatschappij. Advance online publication. https://doi.org/10.5553/BenM/138900692024001
- Thijs, P. E., van der Meer, T. W. G., Mulder, L. E. M., Wanders, F. H. K., ten Dam, G. T. M., & van de Werfhorst, H. G. (2024). Conditionally supporting freedom of speech: how cognitive sophistication and social identity affect adolescents’ support for freedom of speech and its restrictions. Journal of Youth Studies. Advance online publication. https://doi.org/10.1080/13676261.2024.2419092
- ten Dam, G. T. M., Dijkstra, A. B., & Janmaat, J. G. (2024). Bevorderen van burgerschap als maatschappelijke opdracht van de school. In J. Demanet, M. Van Houtte, & M. Vermeulen (Eds.), Sociologen over onderwijs: Inzichten, praktijken en kritieken (pp. 317–338). Garant.
