= Jantine Schuit =

Dutch researcher and university administrator

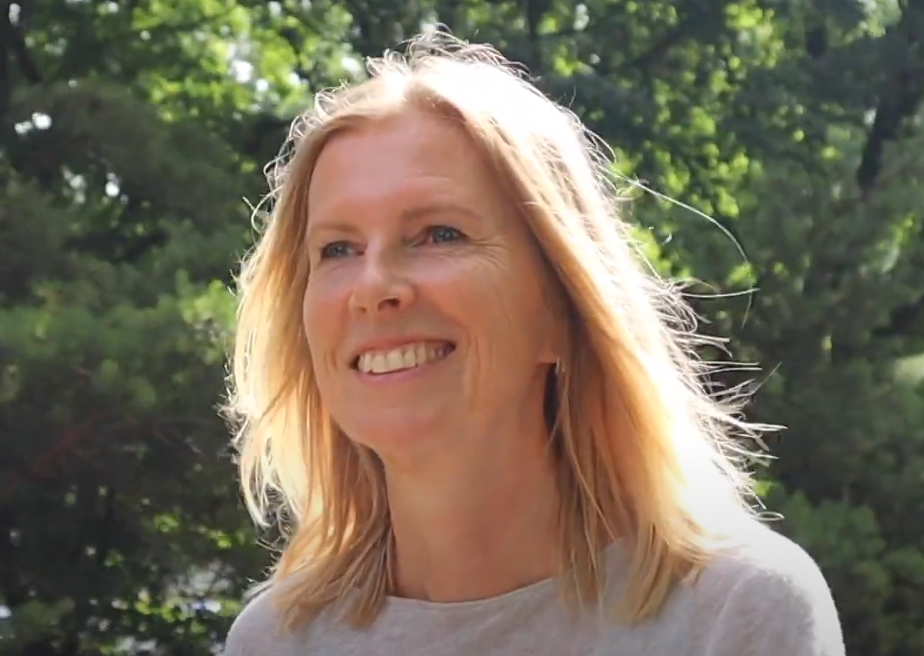
- Jantine Schuit in 2021.
- Born: Albertine Jeannette Schuit; 1964 (age 61–62)
- Education: Wageningen University & Research
- Occupations: professor health, behaviour and society
- Organization(s): Erasmus University Rotterdam (since 2024); Tilburg University (since 2017); Vrije Universiteit Amsterdam (2005–2017); RIVM (1997–2017)
- Known for: Regular Physical Activity in Old Age : Effect on Coronary Heart Disease Risk Factors and Well-Being (dissertation)

Jantine Schuit (1964) is a Dutch scientist and university administrator. Since 1 November 2024, Schuit has been rector magnificus of Erasmus University Rotterdam (EUR), succeeding Annelien Bredenoord. She has been professor of health, behaviour and society at Tilburg University since 2017, and previously served as vice-rector magnificus on its board of directors from November 2020 until October 2024.

== Biography ==
Schuit studied household and consumer sciences at Wageningen University, majoring in epidemiology and health studies. She obtained her master of science there in 1989, before earning her PhD in 1997 on research into the effect of an exercise programme on risk factors for cardiovascular disease in elderly people.

Schuit explains the Recognition & Rewards program of Tilburg University (2021).

In the following 20 years, Schuit worked at the National Institute for Public Health and the Environment (RIVM) in Bilthoven, including as Deputy Director of Public Health and Care and Head of the Nutrition, Prevention and Care Centre. At the same time, she was affiliated with the Vrije Universiteit Amsterdam (VU) as University Senior Lecturer and Associate Professor from 2005 to 2017. Then her professorship began in Health, Behaviour and Society at Tilburg University, while she additionally held the position of dean at Tilburg School of Social and Behavioral Sciences. As vice-rector of Tilburg University she was responsible for teaching, research and impact, and worked on innovation, professionalisation and quality assurance of teaching. In October 2024, she stepped down from her board positions at Tilburg University in preparation for her new position at EUR.

Schuit has been rector magnificus at Erasmus University Rotterdam since 1 November 2024. Together with president Annelien Bredenoord (the previous rector) and vice-president Ellen van Schoten, Schuit constituted the first all-female board of directors at a Dutch university in history. When she took office as rector, she began by spending 100 days in conversation with 100 random students, academics and staff of Erasmus University to listen to them about anything important that might be going on inside and outside the university. Furthermore, she immediately had to make difficult choices due to announced severe cuts in higher education, whereas, as far as she was concerned, there was a need to invest in the knowledge economy.

== Publications ==
- Schuit, A.J. (1997). Regular Physical Activity in Old Age : Effect on Coronary Heart Disease Risk Factors and Well-Being. Wageningen: Wageningen University & Research. p. 162. (dissertation)
- Schuit, Jantine (30 November 2018). Changing behavior to promote health for all : A life-course approach. Inaugural address by prof. dr. Jantine Schuit (PDF). Tilburg: Tilburg University. p. 27. ISBN 978-94-6167-376-3. (inaugural speech as professor of Health, Behaviour and Society at Tilburg University)
