= Right to Work laws in the UK =

UK law on right to work

In the United Kingdom all employers are required by law to check that their employees have the right to work in the UK. The British government's website states that "You must check that a job applicant is allowed to work for you in the UK before you employ them."

A complete guide to the combination of documents accepted as right-to-work documents and how to check them can be found on the government website for Acceptable right to work documents. The correct document combinations depend on the potential employee themselves, but include these documents:

- Passport
- Biometric Residence Permit
- National Identity Card
- Full Birth Certificate
- Certificate of Naturalisation
- Passport with valid Visa inside.

It is the employer's responsibility to check the validity of the documents presented. Employers "must be in the physical possession of the original document or documents", although due to the coronavirus pandemic temporary changes have been made to the ways employers can check documents.

== The law ==
Under section 15 of the Immigration, Asylum and Nationality Act 2006, an employer may be liable for a civil penalty if they employ someone who does not have the right to undertake the work in question.

However the employer will have a "statutory excuse" (under section 15(3) of the 2006 Act) if it carries out a "Right to Work" check complying with the Immigration (Restrictions on Employment) Order 2007, SI 2007/3290 (as amended).

The civil penalty can be up to £20,000 per illegal worker, and/or a criminal sanction of an unlimited fine or imprisonment of five years.

== Checking document validity ==
=== Manually ===
When performing a document validity check the wording of the guidance is "If you are given a false document, you will only be liable for a civil penalty if it is reasonably apparent that it is false. This means that a person who is untrained in the identification of false documents, examining it carefully, but briefly, and without the use of technological aids could reasonably be expected to realise that the document in question is not genuine."

=== Scanning technology ===
Later, the document states that "You may, however, wish to consider using a commercially available document scanner to help check the authenticity of documents presented to you, notably passports, Biometric Residence Permits (BRPs) and Residence Cards (biometric format)."

There are several companies who offer document validation and/or authentication of documents ranging from mobile-phone software to specialised document scanners.
