= Kim Putters =

Dutch politician (born 1973)

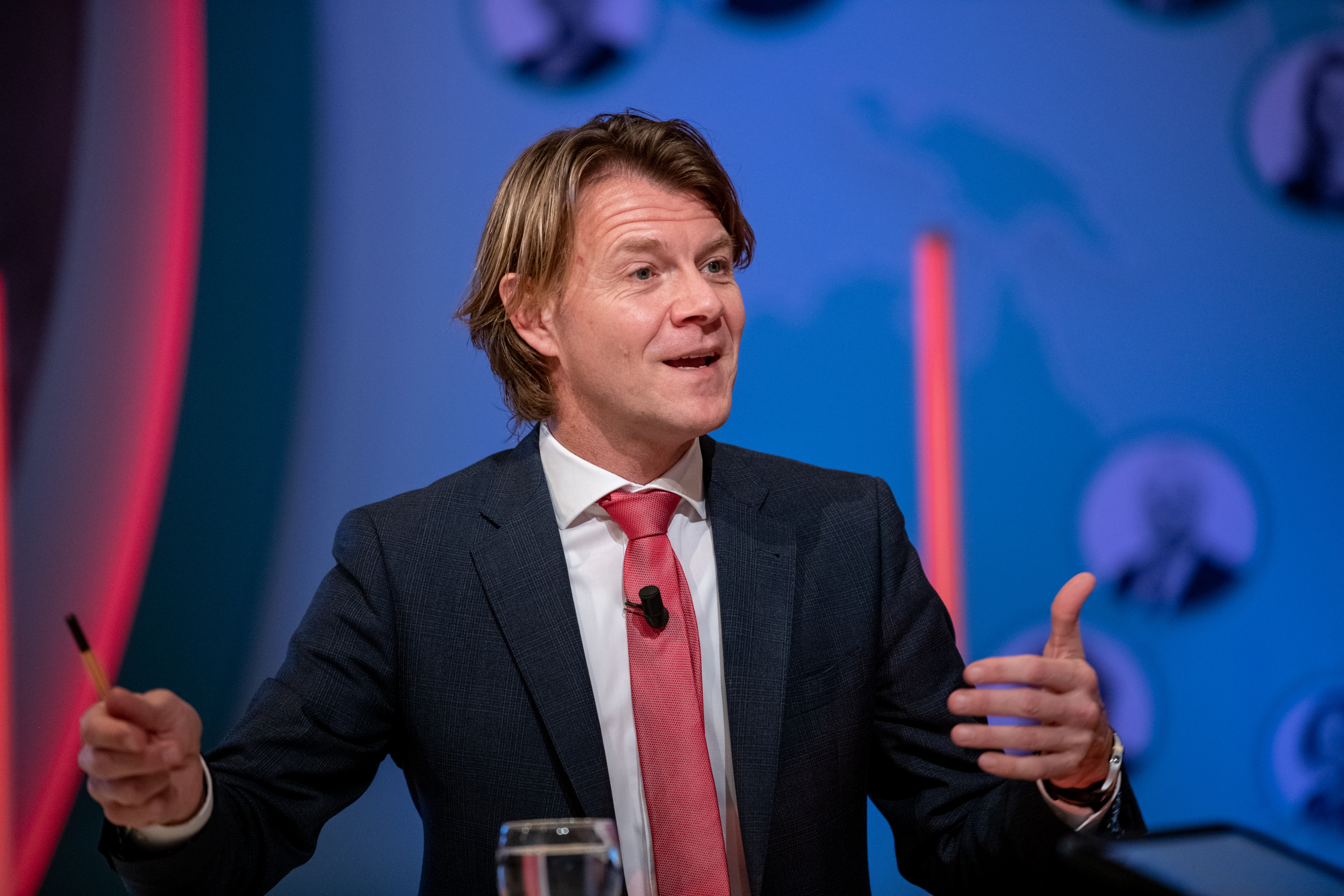

Chairman of the Social and Economic Council
- Incumbent
- Assumed office 16 September 2022
- Preceded by: Mariëtte Hamer

Member of the Senate
- In office 11 June 2003 – 15 June 2013

Personal details
- Born: 22 September 1973 (age 52) Hardinxveld-Giessendam, Netherlands
- Party: Labour Party
- Education: Erasmus University Rotterdam

Kim Putters (Dutch pronunciation: [kɪm ˈpʏtərs]; born 22 September 1973) is a Dutch public administrator, former politician and administrator. From 2003 to 15 June 2013 he was a Member of the Dutch Senate for the Labour Party. Since his retirement from the Dutch Senate, he was director of The Netherlands Institute for Social Research (SCP) until June 2022. Since 16 September 2022 he has been chairman of the Social and Economic Council (SER).

== Early life and career ==
Putters grew up in a family that was active in the inland shipping industry. He was professor of Health Care Policy and Steering at Erasmus University Rotterdam until 2022, since 2022 he has been professor of Broad Welfare at Tilburg University.

=== Dutch Senate ===
Putters served as a member of the Dutch Senate from 2003 to 11 june 2013. From 2011 until his departure in 2013, Putters served as the First Vice President of the Senate. He also served as deputy leader of the PvdA in the Upper House. In the Senate, he focused on science policy and higher education, public housing and spatial planning, and public health, welfare and sport.

From 2011 to 2013, he also chaired the Dutch parliamentarian delegation in the Inter-Parliamentary Union (IPU). In the municipality of Hardinxveld-Giessendam, he acted as a council member, party leader, and formateur between 2002 and 2012.

=== Netherlands Institute for Social Research (SCP) ===
Putters served as director of the Netherlands Institute for Social Research (SCP) from 2013 to 2022. In that role, he directed the SCP and advised cabinet and parliament on the social issues of our time, putting them in a broader societal context. Putters regularly wrote opinion pieces that appeared in Het Financieele Dagblad, and de Volkskrant named him the most influential person of the Netherlands in 2019 and 2020. He often commented on growing dissatisfaction among citizens with politics and policy, as well as an increasingly fierce public discourse. He criticised budget cuts of the second Rutte cabinet, and he called for the creation of a new social contract between citizens and "the elite" to allow for societal, economic, and ecological progress.

=== Social and Economic Council ===
Putters has been a Crown-appointed member of the Social and Economic Council (SER) since January 2017 for his role as director of the Netherlands Institute for Social Research (SCP). On 17 June 2022, the Council of Ministers (Netherlands) approved the appointment of Putters as president of the Social and Economic Council of the Netherlands (SER). He succeeded Mariëtte Hamer, who had been appointed by the government of Prime Minister Mark Rutte as commissioner for combating inappropriate behaviour and sexual violence, a new role in which she is tasked with coming up with a plan to tackle sexually inappropriate behaviour and sexual violence.

Putters was appointed informateur as part of the 2023–2024 Dutch cabinet formation on 14 February 2024. Selected by the Party for Freedom (PVV) – the winner of the November 2023 general election – Putters was tasked with investigating the most viable governing arrangement. New Social Contract (NSC) had left talks with the PVV, BBB, and VVD under the previous informateur, Ronald Plasterk, while declaring it would still be open to a minority or extraparliamentary cabinet. Putters eventually advised a coalition consisting of the same four parties with a concise coalition agreement and a cabinet comprised half of non-politicians. Geert Wilders agreed to forgo his wish to become prime minister. He later asked Putters to serve as prime minister, but he turned down the offer.

Putters has been a member of the Scout movement from an early age. From 2008 to 2011 he was a board member of Scouting Nederland. Putters is also a member of the Advisory Board of the Dutch National Youth Council, member of the National Committee for 4 and 5 May (since 2019) and vice-president of the social welfare foundation Oranje Fonds (since October 2016).

== Bibliography ==
- Veenbrand, Uitgeverij Prometheus, 2019, ISBN 978-90-446-4009-0
- Topvorm, co-authored with Maarten Janssen, Uitgeverij Prometheus, 2022, ISBN 978-90-446-4959-8
- Het Einde van de BV Nederland, Uitgeverij Prometheus, 2022, ISBN 978-90-446-5153-9
