= Tjebbe van Oostenbruggen =

Dutch politician (born 1979)

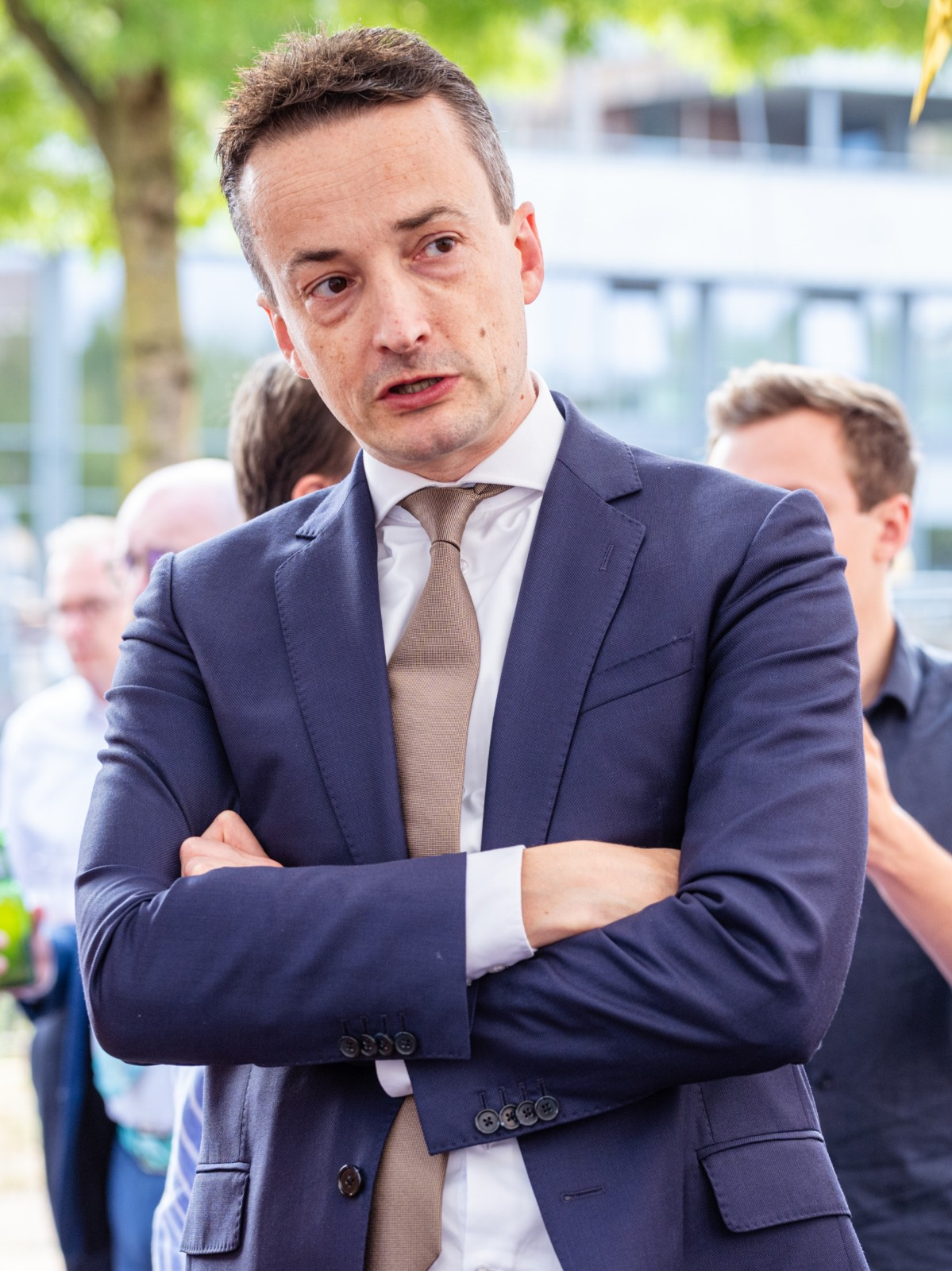
- Van Oostenbruggen in 2025

State Secretary for Tax Affairs, the Tax Administration and Customs
- In office 15 November 2024 – 22 August 2025
- Prime Minister: Dick Schoof
- Minister: Eelco Heinen
- Preceded by: Folkert Idsinga
- Succeeded by: Eugène Heijnen

Member of the House of Representatives
- In office 6 December 2023 – 15 November 2024
- Succeeded by: Folkert Idsinga

Personal details
- Born: 22 September 1979 (age 47) Zeist, Netherlands
- Party: New Social Contract
- Children: 2
- Education: Maastricht University
- Occupation: Politician; Corporate executive

Tjebbe van Oostenbruggen (Dutch: [ˈtɕɛbə vɑn ˈoːstə(m)brʏɣə(n)]; born 22 September 1979) is a Dutch politician of New Social Contract (NSC). He served as State Secretary for Tax Affairs, the Tax Administration and Customs in the Schoof cabinet between 15 November 2024 and 22 August 2025. He was a member of the House of Representatives between December 2023 and November 2024.

== Early life and career ==
Van Oostenbruggen was born on 22 September 1979 in Zeist, Utrecht, and he graduated from De Bruijne Lyceum in the city of Utrecht in 1998 with a vwo diploma. He subsequently studied international business at Maastricht University, where he was a member of a Christian student association. He started his career in 2004 at a finance and risk consultancy firm.

In 2009, Van Oostenbruggen started working for managed service provider Brainnet, supporting companies in the banking, insurance, and IT industries, where he served as a commercial manager. He became a co-owner in 2011 through a management buyout, and he took on the role of CEO in 2016, during which the company's revenue reached €600 million. In 2021, he sold Brainnet to PRO Unlimited, an American company that was later renamed Magnit. RTL Nieuws reported that the sale earned Van Oostenbruggen €54 million, and Quote magazine has estimated his net worth at €70 million. He stayed on as director for Europe for 1.5 years. In 2023, he founded a new firm called Genua Capitals with two partners with the intention to invest.

== Politics ==
Van Oostenbruggen joined NSC when it was founded by Pieter Omtzigt in the run-up to the November 2023 general election. He was placed fifteenth on the party list, and he was elected. His focus was on social affairs and defense personnel and materiel before changing to finances, employment, and labor migration. Van Oostenbruggen said he wanted to improve the Dutch business climate, and he argued that entrepreneurs were underrepresented in parliament. He led NSC's campaign for the June 2024 European Parliament election, in which the party secured one seat. NSC entered a right-wing coalition government with the Party for Freedom (PVV), the People's Party for Freedom and Democracy (VVD), and the Farmer–Citizen Movement (BBB), led by Dick Schoof as prime minister. In August 2024, Van Oostenbruggen assisted Omtzigt in negotiations over next year's budget, and he later supported Nicolien van Vroonhoven in negotiations over asylum measures in October 2024, when Omtzigt was recovering from illness.

Van Oostenbruggen succeeded Folkert Idsinga as State Secretary for Tax Affairs, the Tax Administration and Customs in the Schoof cabinet on 15 November 2024, two weeks after Idsinga resigned over questions about his personal finances. His portfolio includes taxation, customs, financial relations with lower governments, state ownership of Holland Casino and Nederlandse Loterij, and Domains Movable Property. He complied with requests from the House of Representatives to enforce a ban on false self-employment leniently, by refraining from imposing fines in 2025. The government would require retroactive payments after issuing a warning. Van Oostenbruggen's predecessor had announced the government would start enforcement of the legislation, which had been in force since 2016.

He was tasked with reforming the wealth tax after the Supreme Court had invalidated its reliance on assumed yields in 2021 and had subsequently rejected a proposed transition arrangement. A bill by one of Van Oostenbruggen's predecessors to tax actual yields was deemed overly complex and difficult to implement by the Council of State in November 2024. Van Oostenbruggen postponed the implementation of the new system by a year to 2028. In the meantime, the wealth tax would be levied using assumed yields, with taxpayers having the possibility to challenge unfair filings. The tax burden would be increased to compensate for reduced tax yields.

== Personal life ==
Van Oostenbruggen has a South Korean wife and two daughters, and he lived in De Meern as of 2024. He is a member of the Dutch Reformed Churches, and he has been chairperson of a local church. Van Oostenbruggen plays volleyball.

== Electoral history ==
Electoral history of Tjebbe van Oostenbruggen
Year	Body	Party	Pos.	Votes	Result		Ref.
Year	Body	Party	Pos.	Votes	Party seats	Individual	Ref.
2023	House of Representatives	New Social Contract	15	525	20	Won	
2025	House of Representatives	New Social Contract	4	656	0	Lost	

Political offices
Preceded by Folkert Idsinga	State Secretary for Tax Affairs, the Tax Administration and Customs; 2024–2025	Succeeded by Eugène Heijnen
