= Diederik Boomsma =

Dutch politician (born 1978)

Member of the House of Representatives
- Incumbent
- Assumed office 12 November 2025
- In office 4 July 2024 – 21 August 2025
- Preceded by: Judith Uitermark
- Succeeded by: Eddy van Hijum

Member of the Amsterdam Municipal Council
- In office 10 November 2016 – 11 October 2023

Personal details
- Born: Diederik Thomas Boomsma; 22 June 1978 (age 48) Leiderdorp, Netherlands
- Party: JA21 (since 2025)
- Other political affiliations: CDA (2010–2023); NSC (2023–2025)
- Education: Durham University (BSc); UCL (MSc); Leiden University (PhD)

Diederik Thomas Boomsma (born 22 June 1978) is a Dutch author, journalist and politician of the JA21 party.

Boomsma worked as a lecturer, commentator and publisher before entering politics. He was previously leader of the Christian Democratic Appeal on Amsterdam Council and then a member of the House of Representatives for New Social Contract (NSC) between 4 July 2024 and 21 August 2025. He served as NSC's migration spokesman and stood in its leadership contest to replace Pieter Omtzigt before resigning from the party.

== Biography ==
=== Early life and career ===
Boomsma was born in Leiderdorp in 1978 and grew up in Leiden. He attended the Stedelijk Gymnasium Leiden before spending a period studying in Spain. He subsequently earned a BSc degree in Environmental Sciences from Durham University in the United Kingdom and an MSc in Ecology and Conservation from University College London. After returning to the Netherlands, he conducted doctoral research at Leiden University, where he also taught part‑time. In 2012, he obtained a PhD degree in Philosophy from the same institution. He then worked in the publishing sector, including helping to translate works of the Spanish philosopher José Ortega y Gasset into Dutch. Later he branched into journalism and commentating and worked as an editor at Opinio Media BV. From 2000 to 2005, he was a member of the supervisory board of the Edmund Burke Foundation. He became friends with Thierry Baudet during his time at Leiden and along with British philosopher Roger Scruton helped Baudet to edit his dissertation "The Attack on the Nation State."

== Political career ==
=== Christian Democratic Appeal ===
Boomsma became active in the CDA in 2010. He helped Baudet to found the Forum for Democracy think-tank in 2015 and was approached as a candidate for the FvD in the run-up to the 2017 Dutch general election. However, Boomsma opted to remain active in the CDA. He was a member of the Amsterdam Municipal Council for the Christian Democratic Appeal from November 2010 until October 2023. He succeeded Marijke Shahsavari-Jansen as CDA faction leader in 2016 and formed a one-man faction on the city council where he campaigned for, among others, allotment gardeners, houseboat residents, the rights of Jewish Amsterdammers, neighborhood parking and the Amsterdam victims of the Dutch childcare benefits scandal. In 2022, he was voted "best councillor in the Netherlands". Boomsma was considered part of the CDA's more conservative political faction.

=== New Social Contract ===
Boomsma defected to Pieter Omtzigt's newly founded party, New Social Contract (NSC) and was announced as a candidate for the 2023 Dutch general election and was elected to the House of Representatives. He succeeded Judith Uitermark, who had been appointed interior minister in the Schoof cabinet two days earlier, and his portfolio includes migration, human trafficking, prostitution, spatial planning, nature, and fisheries.

In parliament, Boomsma focused strongly on the issue of immigration. He argued that the Netherlands needed a humane but realistic asylum policy and that there was a perverse incentive for people to undertake long, potentially fatal journeys because they enjoy more rights in Europe than outside of it. He argued this could be countered with reception hubs to assess and assist legal immigration. During his time as a member of parliament, he gave a lecture on asylum policy at the first NSC member congress after the formation of the government. He said the Netherlands should work on amending European and international treaties and exiting global agreements on migration to give the Netherlands total control over its border policies.

In June 2025, Boomsma announced his candidacy to seek leadership of the NSC following Omtzigt's resignation. His announcement proved popular on social media and among the NSC's grassroots but was met with mixed responses from other members of the parliamentary faction. As part of his campaign, Boomsma positioned himself as a conservative and Christian democratic candidate, calling for a "conservative course," restrictions on immigration and a tougher line on asylum policy, rule of law and a finding middle ground between populism and technocracy. In his leadership pitch, Boomsma called for a return to the original Christian Democratic ideology and argued "unelected international organizations or elusive bodies of the European Union" and political "legal swamps" had spawned populism and argued for deeper Dutch and international government reform. Boomsma was considered to belong to the right wing of the party during the contest; NSC group leader Nicolien van Vroonhoven called him "the far-right wing" of the NSC parliamentary group. After the NSC party board nominated Eddy van Hijum Boomsma suspended his leadership campaign.

=== JA21 ===
In August 2025, it was revealed Boomsma had switched to JA21 after he was named on the party's candidate list for the 2025 Dutch general election. Following the move, Boomsma said in an interview with De Telegraaf that "NSC has good elements, but it has had little to show for it." Boomsma also announced that he would not retain his seat as a JA21 representative and resign from parliament entirely before contesting the election as a fresh candidate. NSC leader Eddy van Hijum expressed disappointment at Boomsma's announcement but said he respected his decision to not keep his seat. It was reported that several NSC members who had supported his leadership campaign had petitioned JA21's leadership to nominate him as a list candidate. The defection was also not considered a surprise to some commentators since Boosma had previously worked closely with JA21 on Amsterdam council and had expressed ideas closer to the party. He was subsequently reelected to the House.

=== Views ===
Boomsma has expressed support for Dutch Jews and the state of Israel and has campaigned against antisemitism in the Netherlands. In 2023, he tabled a motion on the Amsterdam Council that the city should be twinned with Tel Aviv and has said there should be a review into moving the Dutch embassy in Israel to Jerusalem. In May 2025, he argued that negative public opinion against Israel had been influenced by media bias and anti-Israel propaganda at universities.

== Personal life ==
Boomsma is a practicing Catholic. He speaks Spanish, English, German and Dutch.

== House committees ==
- Committee for Foreign Trade and Development
- Contact group France
- Committee for Asylum and Migration
- Committee for Agriculture, Fisheries, Food Security and Nature
- Committee for Housing and Spatial Planning

== Electoral history ==
Electoral history of Diederik Boomsma
Year	Body	Party	Pos.	Votes	Result		Ref.
Year	Body	Party	Pos.	Votes	Party seats	Individual	Ref.
2022	Amsterdam Municipal Council	Christian Democratic Appeal	1	5,620	1	Won	
2023	House of Representatives	New Social Contract	21	1,316	20	Lost (Note: Boomsma was appointed to the body later during the term due to a vacancy.)	
2025	House of Representatives	JA21	6	3,591	9	Won	
