= 2025 Netherlands budget =

Netherlands budget for 2025

- Presented: 17 September 2024
- Parliament: States General of the Netherlands
- Government: Schoof cabinet
- Finance minister: Eelco Heinen
- Total revenue: €425.1 billion (proposed)
- Total expenditures: €457.0 billion (proposed)
- Debt payment: €8.7 billion (projected)
- Deficit: €31.9 billion (projected)
- Debt: €548.4 billion (projected)
- GDP: €1.176 trillion (projected)

The 2025 Netherlands budget was presented to the States General on 17 September 2024, a day also known as Prinsjesdag. It was the first budget of the Schoof cabinet and of Minister of Finance Eelco Heinen.

== Background and presentation ==
A general election was held in November 2023 that resulted in the swearing in of the right-wing Schoof cabinet in July 2024, consisting of the Party for Freedom (PVV), the People's Party for Freedom and Democracy (VVD), New Social Contract (NSC), and the Farmer–Citizen Movement (BBB). In their coalition agreement, the parties agreed on the cabinet's policy agenda and on its finances. Several financial setbacks arose afterwards, as the Supreme Court ruled that the manner in which the wealth tax was levied was unfair and as the intended sale of the German division of TenneT, a government-owned transmission system operator, failed.

In August 2024, the Bureau for Economic Policy Analysis (CPB) published its economic projections, concluding that government finances would deteriorate and that the budget deficit would grow. The cabinet met after summer recess to draft its budget. In late August, leaders of the coalition parties met with the cabinet at the Ministry of Finance for two days to discuss the 2025 budget. NSC leader Pieter Omtzigt had threatened to withhold support of NSC for the budget, because the unemployed and pensioners did not sufficiently benefit. This would have led to the fall of the cabinet. In the end, Wilders convinced Omtzigt to agree with the budget. Publicly, the PVV, VVD, NSC, and BBB voiced their support for the budget on 30 August 2024. The budget was approved by the Council of Ministers the next day and sent to the Council of State for advice. Ahead of its official presentation, national media outlets reported on several of the budget's changes compared to the coalition agreement.

King Willem-Alexander read the Speech from the Throne on 17 September 2024, Prinsjesdag, from the Koninklijke Schouwburg in The Hague. This venue was used for the third time, as the Ridderzaal was still under renovation. The speech started with a celebration of the performance of Dutch athletes in that summer's Olympic and Paralympic Games in Paris. The government emphasized its task to tackle issues related to economic security, migration, agriculture, and public financing, while navigating spatial, ecological, financial, and labor constraints. Minister of Finance Eelco Heinen offered his cabinet's Budget Memorandum to the House of Representatives the same day. He stressed the importance of sound public financing and of creating an attractive business environment. Referring to past low interest rates, Heinen declared that the "time of free money is really over," using this shift to justify budget cuts.

== Cabinet proposal ==
The 2025 budget, as proposed by the Schoof cabinet, contains €425.1 billion in revenue and €457 billion in expenditures, including €8.7 billion in debt payments. According to CPB projections, this would result in a budget deficit of 2.5% of GDP, complying with the 3% maximum prescribed by the European Union (EU). This norm would be exceeded in 2026 due to a one-time payment related to military pensions. Projections suggested the average household would have a 0.7% increase in purchasing power.

The cabinet proposal included a plan to split the lowest income tax bracket into two, allowing for lower taxation on the lowest portion of income. An increase in the sales tax on hotel stays, sports, culture, books, and newspapers from 9% to 21% would raise the tax's total revenue by €2.3 billion annually starting in 2026. The budget provided €1.3 billion in tax relief for businesses, mainly by reversing measures passed by the House of Representatives the previous year, which had ended a dividend tax exemption, increased the tax on financial interests in companies, and reduced an income tax benefit for foreign workers. Additionally, businesses would be permitted to deduct 25% of their EBITDA from taxable profits for interest expenses, up from the previous limit of 20%. The cabinet proposed to eliminate the deduction for charitable contributions for companies. A significant scaling back of the deduction for individuals, outlined in the coalition agreement, was not included in the budget following criticism from Christian opposition parties.

To address a housing shortage, the cabinet set a goal of ensuring 100,000 homes are built each year. €1 billion would be allocated for this purpose, with an additional €500 million earmarked for the development of essential infrastructure. The Ministry of Infrastructure and Water Management would increase subsidies for the Nederlandse Spoorwegen, allowing train ticket prices to rise by 6% instead of 12%. The defense budget was raised to purchase and modernize materiel and to attract additional personnel. Besides, the cabinet planned to spend €95 million on stricter migration measures, such as border control, €162 million on automation and digitization in healthcare, €120 million on tackling organized crime, and an additional €230 million on the police.

Funding for higher education and research would be cut by €1 billion. This would be achieved through lowering the number of international students, increasing tuition for students exceeding the standard duration, reducing money allocated to the Fund for Research and Science, and scrapping research grants. The latter measure replaced a plan from the coalition agreement to terminate 1,200 recently created academic positions. The cabinet restored funding for school meals, which had been scrapped in the coalition agreement, and it allocated €59 million towards compensating primary and secondary schools for the increased sales tax on school books.

== Responses ==
=== Political ===
The four coalition parties – PVV, VVD, NSC, and BBB – had endorsed the budget proposed by the Schoof cabinet before its presentation. Geert Wilders (PVV) said the plans would address the most pressing issues in the Netherlands, but he was critical of funds appropriated to climate change mitigation, which he referred to as "climate madness". According to Dilan Yeşilgöz (VVD), the budget was positive for hard-working citizens, and Caroline van der Plas (BBB) appreciated funding for agricultural innovations. Opposition parties such as the social democratic GroenLinks–PvdA and the Socialist Party criticized the proposed budget for favoring the wealthy, arguing that the projected rise in purchasing power was reduced from 1.1% to 0.7% to finance a compensation scheme for wealth tax payers, following a court ruling. The progressive Democrats 66 (D66) party condemned budget cuts in education and culture. The Reformed Political Party (SGP) welcomed the cabinet's plans to tackle housing and migration issues, calling itself critical yet supportive.

During the General Financial Debate in the House of Representatives, coalition parties advocated for the budget, but tensions arose between the VVD and NSC over priorities. The VVD emphasized boosting purchasing power for workers, while NSC argued that supporting benefit recipients is essential to closing societal divides. Several parties complained about past budget projections for being overly pessimistic resulting in needless cuts, prompting Minister of Finance Eelco Heinen to launch an investigation.

=== Institutional ===
The Council of State advised the cabinet to take labor shortages – such as in education, healthcare, and construction – into consideration when executing plans. It also suggested the issue should be addressed more generally, arguing that the system of taxes and benefits can discourage individuals from accepting additional work. The Council of State welcomed Minister Heinen's ambition to keep down the budget deficit, but it remained skeptical about whether lower EU contributions and savings from a stricter asylum policy would materialize. The Court of Audit agreed with the latter, pointing out that asylum costs have historically exceeded projections. It also regarded the proposed 22% cut in the civil service as lacking sufficient explanation, and it called the cabinet's goals in other policy areas unclear.

In November 2024, the European Commission concluded that the Dutch budget violated EU recommendations on the medium to long term that prescribed that government debt and the budget deficit should be limited to 60% and 3% of GDP, respectively.

== House debates and approval ==
=== Sales tax and development aid ===
With the support of all opposition parties, the Senate carried a motion during the General Political Debate in October 2024 urging the cabinet to separate the proposed increase in sales tax on hotel stays, sports, culture, books, and newspapers from its 2025 Tax Plan. This would have allowed parties to vote separately on the two issues, but the cabinet refused to comply. MP Hans Vijlbrief (D66) unsuccessfully negotiated with coalition parties to find an alternative measure to the sales tax increase to raise funding. Several writers, actors, and sportspeople demonstrated against the increase at the House of Representatives. A debate about the issue was postponed due to the resignation of State Secretary for Tax Affairs and the Tax Administration Folkert Idsinga for unrelated reasons. In November 2024, after opposition parties with a Senate majority threatened to block the 2025 Tax Plan, Heinen committed to seeking an alternative to the proposed tax increase on sports, culture, books, and newspapers. The measure remained in the plan to avoid a €1.2 billion annual funding gap. Support for the tax plan from Christian opposition parties was contingent on two additional concessions that were granted by the cabinet: the scaling back of the deduction for charitable contributions was dropped, and a tax credit for singe-income households was expanded.

The decoupling of the development aid budget from the size of the Dutch economy had not been agreed to by coalition parties according to Tjebbe van Oostenbruggen of NSC. Heinen responded that additional funds would have to be found to preserve the linkage, which had been in place for decades. In November 2024, NSC voted against a motion of the opposition to restore the coupling, opting instead to renegotiate the issue ahead of the upcoming Spring Memorandum, in which budget revisions are included. To secure a Senate majority for the development aid budget, coalition parties helped pass an amendment by the SGP and JA21 to reduce the government's contribution to the agency UNRWA from €19 million annually to €15 million in 2025 and €1 million by 2029.

=== Education and final approval ===
During debates about the education budget in late November, two separate groups of opposition parties made alternative proposals, while a protest against the budget cuts was held at Malieveld in The Hague. Democrats 66 (D66), the Christian Democratic Appeal (CDA), and JA21 – calling themselves the "unholy alliance" – presented a plan to reduce the cuts by €1.3 billion, aiming to secure alternative government funding by reducing an intended decrease in health insurance deductibles, mandating medical specialists to be employed as staff members, and allowing individuals delaying retirement to defer state pension payments. Separately, GroenLinks–PvdA, the Socialist Party (SP), the Party for the Animals (PvdD), Denk, and Volt proposed to reverse the entire €2 billion education budget cut by combating tax avoidance, introducing a digital services tax, and reducing fossil fuel subsidies. Education minister Eppo Bruins responded that he would not reverse any cuts, and he called them necessary in light of the cabinet's financial priorities.

The four coalition parties invited the "unholy alliance", which had been joined by the Christian Union (CU) and the Reformed Political Party (SGP), for negotiation. Votes on all budget bills were postponed by a week and D66 dropped out of talks before a deal was struck on 11 December 2024 that would reduce the €2 billion cuts by €750 million, to preserve funding for students exceeding the standard program duration, for the civilian service, and for teacher salaries. The money was instead raised mainly through cuts in the health care budget, general administrative costs, and student travel. Healthcare minister Fleur Agema responded concernedly to the new cuts in her ministry's budget for additional and refresher training for medical specialist care, and it prompted five professional and trade associations to pull out of the Integral Care Agreement, established in 2022 to maintain affordable and accessible healthcare. The negotiating parties stated that it had not been their intention to affect training for nurses, and they introduced a motion calling on Agema to find an alternative cut in the healthcare budget. It was unanimously adopted by the House on 19 December.

The House approved the revised budgets for all ministries on 12 December 2024. The Senate, however, deferred its vote to early 2025 to allow for further deliberation. In the absence of formally adopted budgets, ministries are required to exercise caution in their spending.

=== Votes ===
Nr.	Name	House	Senate	Ref.
	Tax Plan	109 / 150	49 / 73	
II	High Councils of State, cabinet of the governors and the Electoral Council	138 / 149	70 / 75	
IV & H	Kingdom Relations and BES islands	135 / 149	73 / 75	
V	Foreign Affairs	135 / 149		
VI	Justice and Security	135 / 149	67 / 75	
VII	Interior	135 / 149	70 / 75	
VIII	Education, Culture and Science	102 / 149	47 / 75	
IX	Finance	135 / 149	67 / 75	
XII	Infrastructure and Water Management	135 / 149	67 / 75	
XIII	Economic Affairs	124 / 149	65 / 75	
XIV	Agriculture, Fisheries, Food Security and Nature	103 / 149	39 / 75	
XV	Social Affairs and Employment	135 / 149	67 / 75	
XVI	Health, Welfare and Sport	135 / 149	60 / 75	
XVII	Foreign Trade and Development	99 / 149	44 / 75	
XX	Asylum and Migration	96 / 149	44 / 75	
XXII	Housing and Spatial Planning	135 / 149	60 / 75	
XXIII	Climate Policy and Green Growth	102 / 149	67 / 75	
	All other	135 / 149	Formality	
