= Folkert Idsinga =

Dutch tax lawyer and politician (born 1971)

State Secretary for Tax Affairs and the Tax Administration
- In office 2 July 2024 – 1 November 2024
- Prime Minister: Dick Schoof
- Minister: Eelco Heinen
- Preceded by: Marnix van Rij
- Succeeded by: Tjebbe van Oostenbruggen

Member of the House of Representatives
- In office 27 November 2024 – 11 November 2025
- Preceded by: Tjebbe van Oostenbruggen
- In office 6 December 2023 – 2 July 2024
- Succeeded by: Natascha Wingelaar
- In office 31 March 2021 – 5 September 2023
- Succeeded by: Yvonne Bijenhof

Personal details
- Born: Folkert Lútsen Idsinga; 22 December 1971 (age 54) Bakkeveen, Netherlands
- Party: NSC (2023–present)
- Other political affiliations: VVD (until 2023)
- Education: University of Groningen
- Occupation: Tax lawyer

Folkert Lútsen Idsinga (Dutch pronunciation: [ˈfɔlkərt ˈɪtsɪŋɣaː]; born 22 December 1971) is a Dutch tax lawyer and politician.

He was a partner at law firm Baker McKenzie, and he was elected to the House of Representatives in the 2021 general election on behalf of the conservative liberal People's Party for Freedom and Democracy (VVD). Idsinga left the House in September 2023 to switch to New Social Contract (NSC), and he was re-elected in November 2023. He became State Secretary for Tax Affairs and the Tax Administration in the Schoof cabinet in July 2024, but he resigned four months later over questions about his personal finances. Idsinga was again a member of the House between November 2024 and November 2025.

== Early life and career ==
Idsinga was born in 1971 in the Friesland village Bakkeveen and studied fiscal economics at the University of Groningen, graduating in 1996. He worked for the accounting firm Arthur Andersen until he took a job at the law firm Baker & McKenzie in 2002. Idsinga was specialized in value-added tax and became a partner in 2004. He was promoted to joint managing partner and co-chair of the board of directors of the company's Amsterdam office in July 2015. Idsinga stopped being managing partner in 2018 but kept working at Baker McKenzie as a partner.

== Politics ==
Idsinga ran for member of parliament in the 2021 general election as the VVD's 33rd candidate. He was elected, receiving 483 preference votes, and was sworn into the House of Representatives on 31 March. His portfolio included tax affairs, financial relations between the national government and decentralized governments, export credit insurance and facilities, Holland Casino, the Dutch Lottery, currency, and Domains Movable Property. Idsinga left the House on 5 September 2023. Following his November 2023 re-election on the party list of NSC, he served as the party's spokesperson for taxation and benefits.

After the PVV, VVD, NSC, and BBB formed the Schoof cabinet, Idsinga was sworn in as State Secretary for Tax Affairs and the Tax Administration on 2 July 2024. His portfolio included taxation, financial relations with lower governments, state ownership of Holland Casino and Nederlandse Loterij, and Domains Movable Property. Idsinga was tasked with steering the 2025 Tax Plan, part of the overall budget, through the parliament, including the Senate where the governing coalition lacked a majority. The plan included a sales tax increase on hotel stays, sports, culture, books, and newspapers from 9% to 21%. Opposition parties in the Senate demanded in early October 2024 that this measure would be separated from the Tax Plan, allowing parties to vote differently on the two issues, but Idsinga refused to comply.

In October 2024, PVV leader Geert Wilders joined opposition parties in demanding transparency about Idsinga's retirement savings, which included business interests and could create conflicts of interest. His savings, valued at over €6 million in 2023, were managed by a foundation for the duration of his term, and Idsinga refused to provide more visibility, citing his privacy. The NOS reported that he was eligible for major tax incentives for a 2019 investment in an algaculture company, which he had disclosed, by categorizing himself as an entrepreneur rather than an investor. Idsinga responded that the Tax Administration had ruled that his arrangement was compliant. On 1 November, Idsinga resigned as state secretary, declaring that he perceived a lack of trust from the House. He continued to deny wrongdoing, and he provided an overview of his financial holdings days later as a private citizen. His portfolio included a vacation home, bonds, minority stakes, and shares in mostly foreign companies. Idsinga was succeeded by Tjebbe van Oostenbruggen two weeks later, and finance minister Eelco Heinen took over the defense of the 2025 Tax Plan.

Idsinga returned to the House on 27 November 2024, filling the vacancy left by Van Oostenbruggen. He had been encouraged to reenter parliament by the parliamentary leader, Pieter Omtzigt, and his acting counterpart, Nicolien van Vroonhoven. Idsinga's portfolio contained finances, financial markets, and economic affairs. He did not run for re-election in 2025, and his term ended on 11 November 2025.

=== House committee assignments ===
==== 2021–2023 term ====
- Committee for Defence
- Committee for Digital Affairs
- Committee for Finance
- Public Expenditure committee
- Contact group Germany
- Contact group United Kingdom
- Contact group United States

==== 2023–present term ====
- Committee for Kingdom Relations
- Committee for Economic Affairs
- Committee for Digital Affairs
- Committee for Finance
- Public Expenditure committee

== Personal life ==
While a member of parliament, Idsinga resided in the Dutch capital Amsterdam.

== Electoral history ==
Electoral history of Folkert Idsinga
Year	Body	Party	Pos.	Votes	Result		Ref.
Year	Body	Party	Pos.	Votes	Party seats	Individual	Ref.
2021	House of Representatives	People's Party for Freedom and Democracy	33	483	34	Won	
2023	House of Representatives	New Social Contract	13	504	20	Won	

Political offices
Preceded by Marnix van Rij	State Secretary for Tax Affairs and the Tax Administration; 2024	Succeeded by Tjebbe van Oostenbruggen
