= Judith Uitermark =

Dutch politician (born 1971)

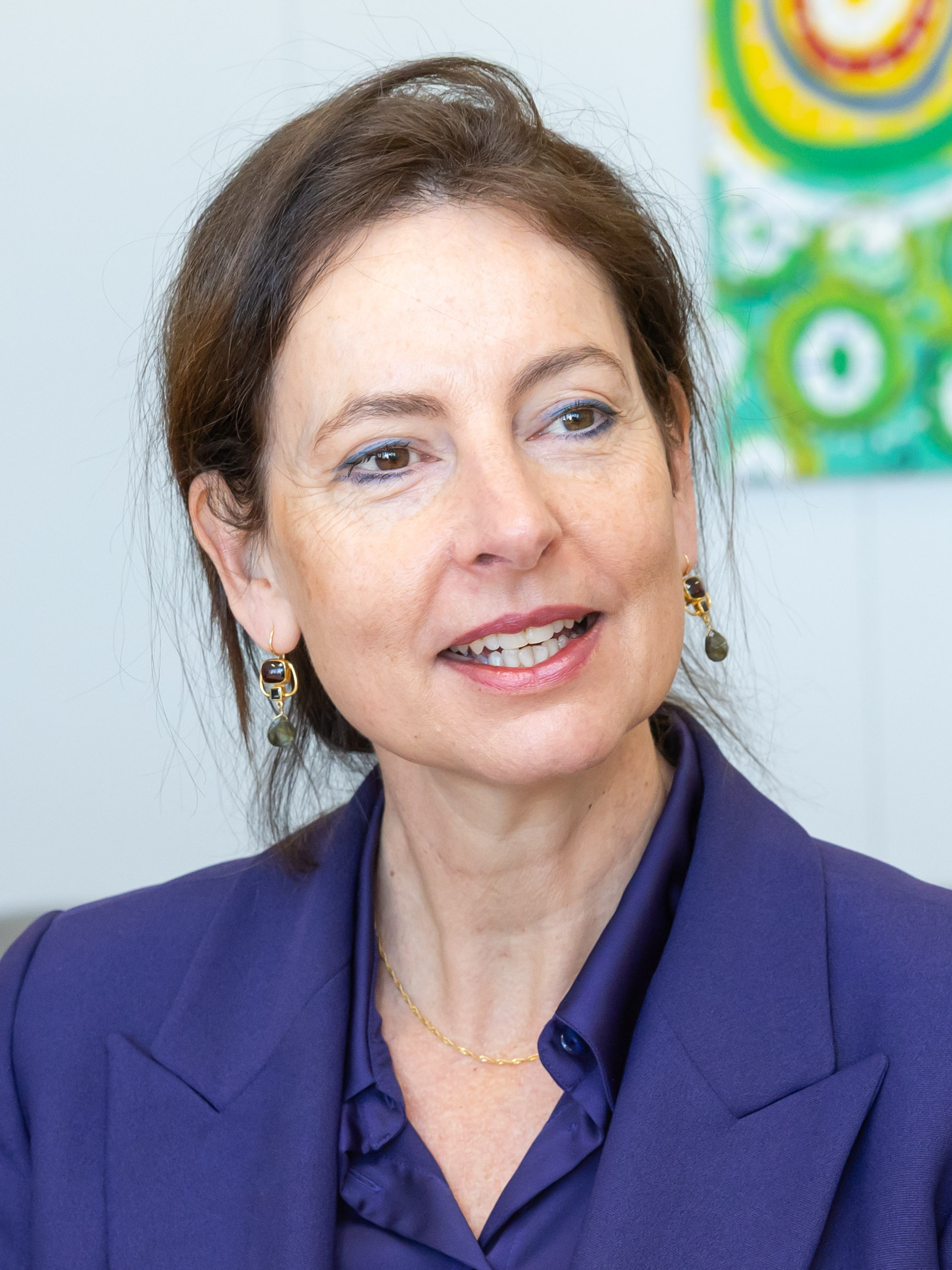
- Uitermark in 2025

Minister of the Interior and Kingdom Relations
- In office 2 July 2024 – 22 August 2025
- Prime Minister: Dick Schoof
- Preceded by: Hugo de Jonge
- Succeeded by: Frank Rijkaart

Member of the House of Representatives
- In office 6 December 2023 – 2 July 2024
- Succeeded by: Diederik Boomsma

Member of the Haarlem Municipal Council
- In office 6 May 1998 – 2001

Personal details
- Born: Judith Johanna Marianne Uitermark; 20 September 1971 (age 55) Edam, Netherlands
- Party: NSC (2023–present)
- Other political affiliations: CDA (formerly)
- Spouse: Coşkun Çörüz
- Education: University of Amsterdam
- Occupation: Politician; judge

Judith Johanna Marianne Uitermark (born 20 September 1971) is a Dutch judge and politician of the Christian democratic New Social Contract (NSC) party. Between 2 July 2024 and 22 August 2025, Uitermark served as minister of the interior and kingdom relations in the Schoof cabinet.

== Early life and career ==
Uitermark was born on 20 September 1971 in Edam in North Holland. She attended secondary education in Breda from 1983 until 1988, graduating with a havo diploma, and she studied business administration and economics at a Haarlem vocational university. She went to the University of Amsterdam in 1993 to study law and public administration. Uitermark started assisting the parliamentary group of the Christian Democratic Appeal (CDA) in the Haarlem Municipal Council alongside in 1995, and she became a councilor herself in 1998.

Upon finishing her studies, Uitermark became a judicial trainee at the Utrecht district court in April 2001, and she stepped down from the municipal council. She continued her career within the judiciary, finally becoming a senior judge at the North Holland district court. A proponent of mediation between perpetrators and victims, Uitermark became involved in a national pilot project around two years after it had started in 2010. She served as National Coordinator for Mediation in Criminal Cases between 2015 and 2022.

=== New Social Contract ===
She met Pieter Omtzigt, who had just founded New Social Contract, in September 2023, and she switched her party affiliation to become the party's third candidate in the November 2023 general election. Uitermark received a seat in the House of Representatives, and her focus was on justice and security. She aimed to make the government a more compassionate and reliable actor, and she cited her dissatisfaction with "toxic politics" as one of her reasons to become politically active.

After the PVV, VVD, NSC, and BBB formed the Schoof cabinet, Uitermark was sworn in as Minister of the Interior and Kingdom Relations on 2 July 2024. The coalition agreement included proposals for two constitutional amendments, namely for the introduction of a constitutional court and for the abolition of a ban on constitutional review. Given that NSC campaigned on proper governance and the election-winning PVV had previously proposed measures conflicting with the rule of law, de Volkskrant described Uitermark as the cabinet's guardian of the Constitution.

Uitermark continued a proposed revision of the Burial and Cremation Act initiated by her predecessor, which would legalize water cremation and expedite burials within 24 hours, in accordance with certain religious practices.

== Personal life ==
Uitermark met her husband Coşkun Çörüz while living in Haarlem. They both served simultaneously on its municipal council, and Çörüz was a member of parliament for the CDA between 2001 and 2012.

== Electoral history ==
Electoral history of Judith Uitermark
Year	Body	Party	Pos.	Votes	Result		Ref.
Year	Body	Party	Pos.	Votes	Party seats	Individual	Ref.
2023	House of Representatives	New Social Contract	3	10,895	20	Won	
2025	House of Representatives	New Social Contract	2	7,149	0	Lost	

== See also ==
- List of female interior ministers

Political offices
Preceded by Hugo de Jonge	Minister of the Interior and Kingdom Relations; 2024–2025	Succeeded by Frank Rijkaart
