= Ilse Saris =

Dutch politician (born 1975)

Member of the House of Representatives
- In office 4 July 2024 – 11 November 2025
- Preceded by: Eddy van Hijum

Personal details
- Born: 23 September 1975 (age 50) Enschede, Netherlands
- Party: New Social Contract
- Occupation: Politician

Ilse Saris (born 23 September 1975) is a Dutch politician for the New Social Contract, who was a member of the House of Representatives between July 2024 and November 2025. She succeeded Eddy van Hijum, who had been appointed social affairs minister in the Schoof cabinet, and her portfolio included socioeconomic policy, social security, social integration, and sports. Saris was not re-elected in October 2025, as NSC lost all its seats, and her term ended on 11 November.

== House committee assignments ==
- Committee for Kingdom Relations
- Committee for Social Affairs and Employment
- Committee for Health, Welfare and Sport (vice chair)
- Contact group Germany

== Electoral history ==
Electoral history of Ilse Saris
Year	Body	Party	Pos.	Votes	Result		Ref.
Year	Body	Party	Pos.	Votes	Party seats	Individual	Ref.
2021	House of Representatives	Christian Democratic Appeal	58 (Note: Participated as lijstduwer in the electoral district Arnhem.)	556	15	Lost	
2023	House of Representatives	New Social Contract	23	6,082	20	Lost (Note: Saris was appointed to the body later during the term due to a vacancy.)	
2025	House of Representatives	New Social Contract	6	1,305	0	Lost	

== See also ==
- List of members of the House of Representatives of the Netherlands, 2023–2025
