= Martijn van Helvert =

Dutch politician (born 1978)

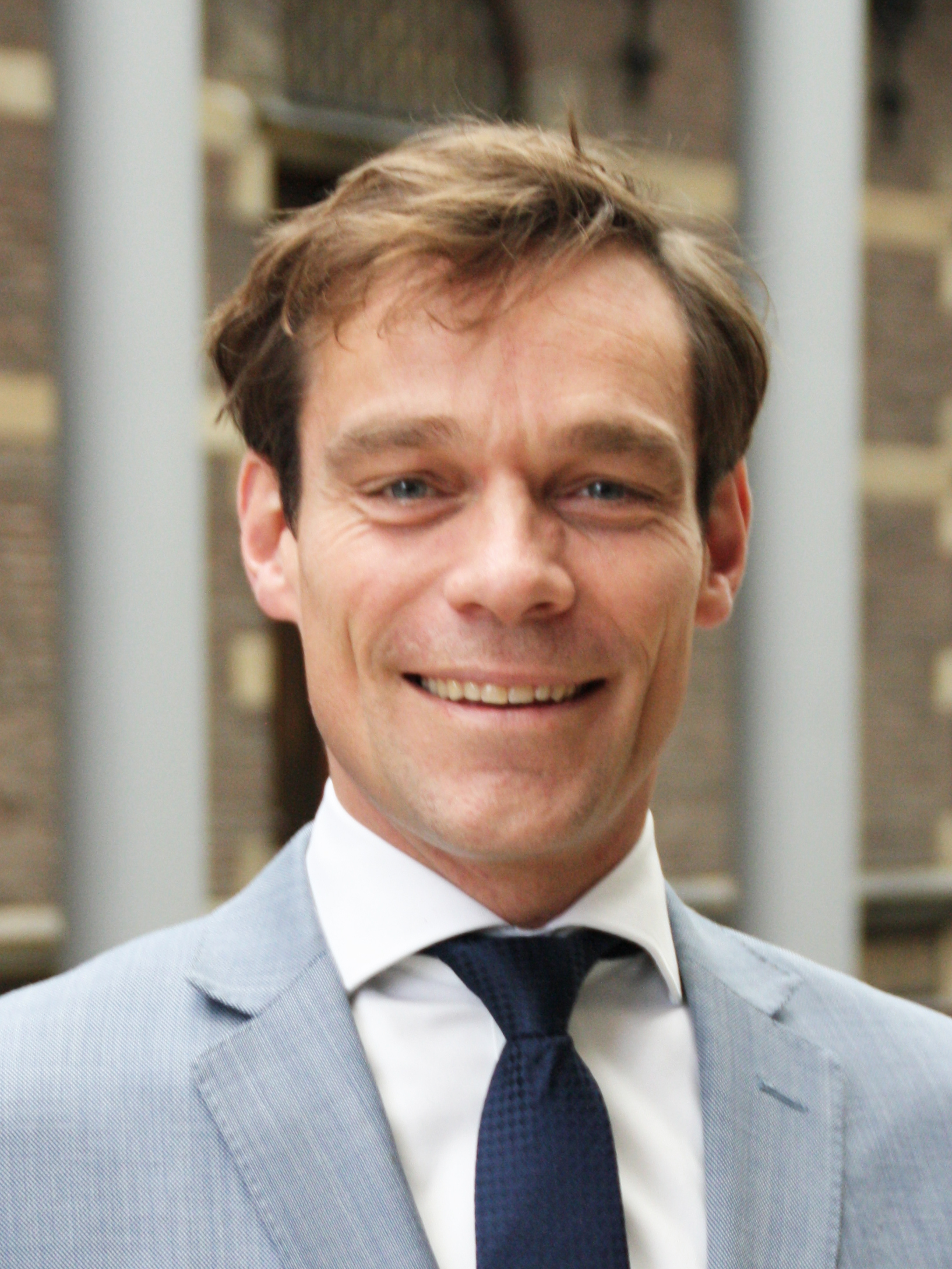
- Van Helvert in 2017

Member of the House of Representatives
- In office 12 November 2014 – 31 March 2021

Member of the States of Limburg
- In office 10 March 2011 – 26 March 2015

Personal details
- Born: 7 April 1978 (age 48) Sittard, Netherlands
- Party: Christian Democratic Appeal
- Education: Utrecht University

Martijn Johanna Franciscus van Helvert (born 7 April 1978) is a Dutch politician who served as a member of the House of Representatives from 2014 to 2021. A member of the Christian Democratic Appeal (CDA), he previously served as a member of the States of Limburg between 2011 and 2015.

== Early life and education ==
Van Helvert studied social geography in his first year at Utrecht University. He then proceeded to study history of ancient times and antique cultures at the same university between 1997 and 2003. Van Helvert was a high school teacher of history and antique culture in Sittard from 2002 to 2007.

== Early political career ==
Van Helvert started his political career by being active in the Christian Democratic Youth Appeal (CDJA). He served as secretary of the youth section of the CDA in both North Brabant and Limburg, respectively from 1996 to 2002 and 2002–2006. Van Helvert was a member of the municipal council of Susteren, Limburg from March 1998 to December 2003, holding office from age 19 onwards. On 1 January 2003 the municipality of Susteren was merged into Echt-Susteren. Van Helvert continued serving in the municipal council of the new municipality until February 2009.

Van Helvert was a personal aide to Noël Lebens, a member of the Provincial Executive of Limburg, for three years from July 2007 until November 2010. He worked as a policy worker for the municipality of Heerlen since that date and stayed on until November 2014. He was a member of the States of Limburg between 10 March 2011 and 26 March 2015.

== National political career ==
In the Parliamentary elections of 2012 Van Helvert occupied number 13 of the CDA party list and the party managed to obtain thirteen seats. However, Pieter Omtzigt managed to obtain more preferential votes than Van Helvert and the former was thus elected. On 12 November 2014 he became a member of the House of Representatives of the Netherlands for the Christian Democratic Appeal (CDA) when he replaced Eddy van Hijum. In addition to his committee assignments, he has been serving as co-chair of the Inter-Parliamentary Alliance on China (IPAC) since 2020.

On 24 June 2020 Van Helvert announced his candidacy for the party list leader position. On 30 June he withdrew his candidacy.

== Electoral history ==
Electoral history of Martijn van Helvert
Year	Body	Party	Pos.	Votes	Result		Ref.
Year	Body	Party	Pos.	Votes	Party seats	Individual	Ref.
2021	House of Representatives	Christian Democratic Appeal	25	15,212	15	Lost	
