= Yvonne Bijenhof =

Dutch politician (born 1966)

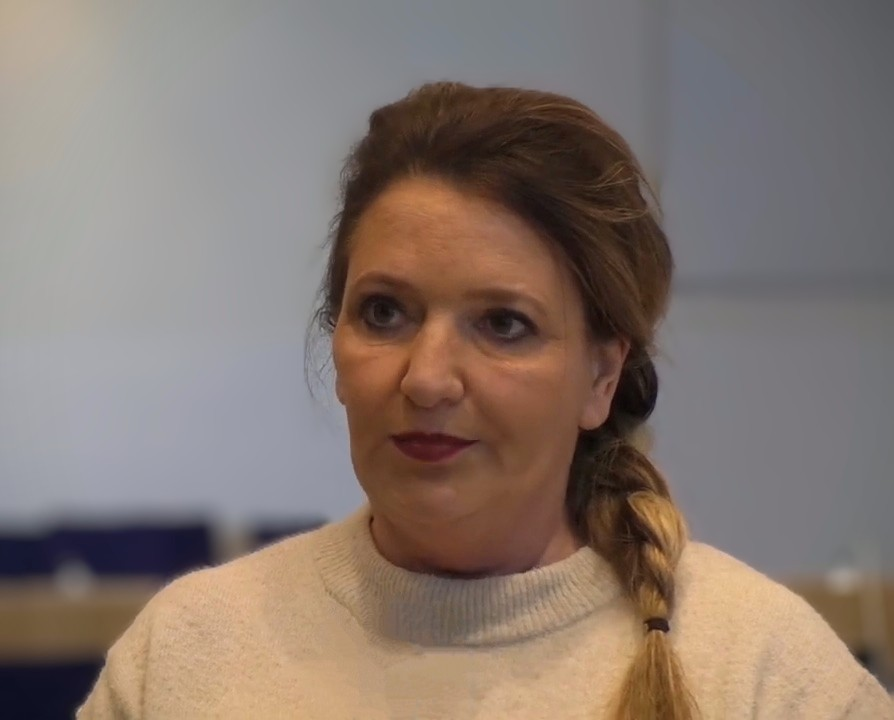
- Bijenhof in 2021

Member of the House of Representatives
- In office 12 September 2023 – 5 December 2023
- Preceded by: Folkert Idsinga

Member of the Almelo Municipal Council
- Incumbent
- Assumed office 29 March 2018

Personal details
- Born: Yvonne Dubbink; 2 August 1966 (age 59) Almelo, Netherlands
- Party: People's Party for Freedom and Democracy
- Spouse: Nico Bijenhof
- Children: 2
- Occupation: Politician; education manager; teacher
- Website: yvonnebijenhof.nl

Yvonne Bijenhof-Dubbink (Dutch pronunciation: [iˈvɔnə ˈbɛiə(n)ɦɔf]; born 2 August 1966) is a Dutch politician of the conservative-liberal People's Party for Freedom and Democracy (VVD). Raised in the Overijssel city of Almelo, she was a high school teacher and later became a manager for the ROC van Twente educational institution. She worked on several initiatives to promote technical skills as well as the regional labor market.

Bijenhof became politically active in the run-up to 2018 municipal elections, and she received a seat in the Almelo Municipal Council. She was re-elected four years later and became the parliamentary leader in of the VVD, which held a plurality in the council. Bijenhof also ran in the 2021 general election, leading in September 2023 to her appointment to the House of Representatives as the successor of Folkert Idsinga.

== Early life and educational career ==
Bijenhof was born as Yvonne Dubbink on 2 August 1966 in the Sint-Elisabeth Hospital in Almelo, Overijssel and grew up in that city. She started her career as a teacher at the Reggesteyn high school, with locations in Nijverdal and Rijssen, and she has taught Dutch language and literature.

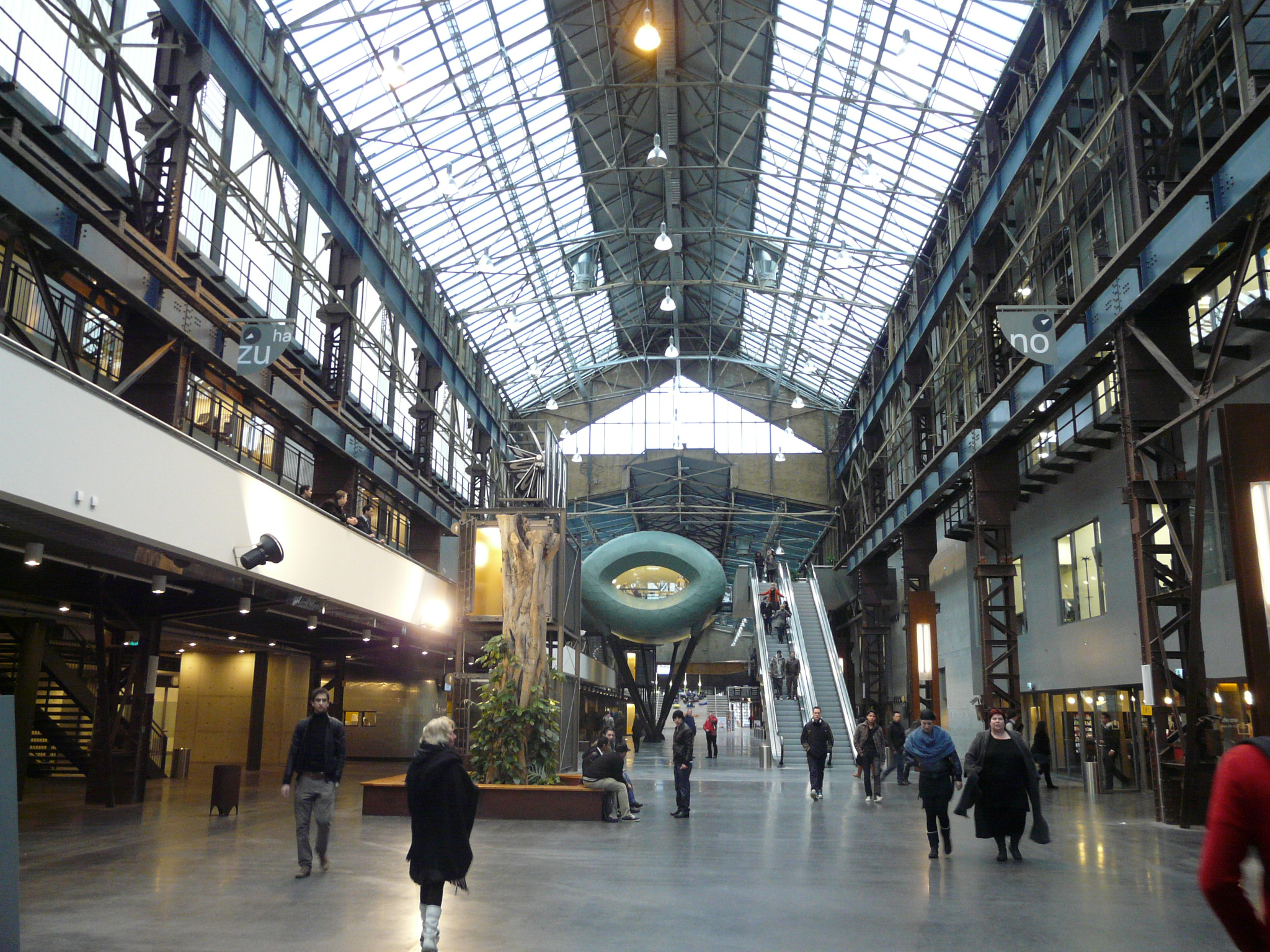
Interior of ROC van Twente

In 2010, Bijenhof began working for ROC van Twente, a regional vocational education center, as a team coordinator. She later became a manager and strategic advisor responsible for the connection between education and the job market. As part of her role, she helped establish Twente Board – a collaboration between educational institutions, the government, and entrepreneurs to promote the regional economy – in 2014, and she served as its administrative secretary. She was involved in its Twente Werkt (Twente works) program to reduce unemployment. At ROC van Twente, Bijenhof was one of the founders of the Triple T High Tech Academy program in 2021, intended to keep those with technical skills in the region to combat a labor shortage. The education center cooperated with several companies as well as with the Heracles Almelo football club. During the COVID-19 pandemic, Bijenhof was involved in a website to match students and companies for internships, as lockdown closures had reduced opportunities. ROC van Twente would subsequently assist these companies in applying for a government subsidy. Next to her job, Bijenhof was on the supervisory board of PCO Noord Twente, a network of Christian elementary schools in Almelo and Wierden, between 2013 and 2022, serving as its chair for the last five of those years. Bijenhof temporarily stepped down from her role at ROC van Twente in 2023 while a member of parliament.

== Politics ==
=== Almelo Municipal Council ===
Bijenhof joined the People's Party for Freedom and Democracy (VVD), stating she agreed with its values of liberty, responsibility, and reciprocity. She ran for the municipal council in her home town of Almelo in March 2018 municipal elections as her party's fourth candidate. She intended to strengthen Almelo's social-economic structure by providing opportunities to those unable to participate in the economy. The VVD jumped from three to six seats out of the total 35, becoming the second-largest party in the council. Bijenhof was sworn in on 29 March 2018, and she was chosen as a member of the body's presidium. The VVD became part of the governing coalition along with the CDA, Christian Union, and the local LAS party. Bijenhof focused on spatial planning, social affairs, economy, governance, and external affairs in the council. From 2019 until 2020, she was on the board of the eastern Netherlands chapter of the VVD – consisting of Gelderland and Overijssel – as secretary.

She sought a second term in the municipal council in March 2022 elections and was re-elected as number two on the VVD's list. The party itself lost one of its six seats, but it did receive a plurality of the vote. Bijenhof became the VVD's parliamentary leader, since the party's lead candidate – Arjen Maathuis – was serving on the municipal executive. She represented her party in negotiations to form a new governing coalition. A coalition agreement between the VVD, LAS, the CDA, and D66 was presented on 17 June 2022, and it included plans to build 3,400 homes and to assign healthcare social workers to neighborhoods. The latter was in response to several people who had been killed in Almelo in preceding years. When the municipal executive had decided in late 2022 to give priority to permanent residents in assigning public housing, coalition parties VVD and LAS voted in favor of a motion by the PVV that attempted to prevent the action. The motion was defeated 16–18, while Bijenhof questioned the executive's trustworthiness because of a 2020 promise against such a priority. She remained on the council when she entered the House of Representatives.

=== House of Representatives ===
Bijenhof ran for the House of Representatives in the March 2021 general election, being placed 48th on the VVD's party list. She pledged to represent the Twente region nationally, aiming to improve its accessibility by road and rail, and she received an endorsement from all fourteen VVD chapters in the region. She also wanted to promote vocational education, calling it the backbone of society. The VVD could claim 34 seats, gaining one, and was again the largest party in the House. Bijenhof was not elected, and 78% of her nearly 3,400 preference votes were from Overijssel. She became a board member of the VVD's directors association in June 2022. When Folkert Idsinga announced his resignation as member of parliament on 5 September 2023 – to switch to New Social Contract shortly after – Bijenhof was appointed to succeed him due to her position on the VVD's party list in 2021. She was installed on 12 September, and she became the party's spokesperson for lifelong learning and adult education. She served solely on the Committee for Kingdom Relations. The collapse of the fourth Rutte cabinet two months before Bijenhof's swearing in had triggered a snap election for November 2023. Bijenhof participated again, as the VVD's 39th candidate.

== Personal life ==
Bijenhof is married to Nico, and they have a daughter and a son. As of 2021, she lived in the Almelo neighborhood of De Hofkamp.

== Electoral history ==
Electoral history of Yvonne Bijenhof
Year	Body	Party	Pos.	Votes	Result		Ref.
Year	Body	Party	Pos.	Votes	Party seats	Individual	Ref.
2018	Almelo Municipal Council	People's Party for Freedom and Democracy	4	201	6	Won	
2021	House of Representatives	People's Party for Freedom and Democracy	48	3,397	34	Lost (Note: Bijenhof was appointed to the body later during the term due to a vacancy.)	
2022	Almelo Municipal Council	People's Party for Freedom and Democracy	2	423	5	Won	
2023	Provincial Council of Overijssel	People's Party for Freedom and Democracy	23	216	4	Lost	
2023	House of Representatives	People's Party for Freedom and Democracy	39	1,380	24	Lost	
2026	Almelo Municipal Council	People's Party for Freedom and Democracy	15	56	5	Lost	
