= Natascha Wingelaar =

Dutch politician (born 1974)

Member of the House of Representatives
- In office 4 July 2024 – 11 November 2025
- Preceded by: Folkert Idsinga

Personal details
- Born: 11 January 1974 (age 52) Stein, Limburg, Netherlands
- Party: New Social Contract
- Occupation: Politician

Natascha Wingelaar (born 11 January 1974) is a Dutch politician for the New Social Contract, who was a member of the House of Representatives between July 2024 and November 2025. She succeeded Folkert Idsinga, who had been appointed taxation state secretary in the Schoof cabinet, and her portfolio included intergovernmental relations, benefits, regions, cross-border cooperation, and environment. Wingelaar was not re-elected in October 2025, as NSC lost all its seats, and her term ended on 11 November.

== House committee assignments ==
- Committee for Digital Affairs (chair)
- Committee for the Interior
- Contact group Belgium
- Committee for Agriculture, Fisheries, Food Security and Nature
- Committee for Infrastructure and Water Management
- Committee for Climate Policy and Green Growth

== Electoral history ==
Electoral history of Natascha Wingelaar
Year	Body	Party	Pos.	Votes	Result		Ref.
Year	Body	Party	Pos.	Votes	Party seats	Individual	Ref.
2023	House of Representatives	New Social Contract	24	4,923	20	Lost (Note: Wingelaar was appointed to the body later during the term due to a vacancy.)	
2025	House of Representatives	New Social Contract	5	1,117	5	Lost	

== See also ==
- List of members of the House of Representatives of the Netherlands, 2023–2025
