= Hein Pieper =

Dutch theologian, writer, and politician

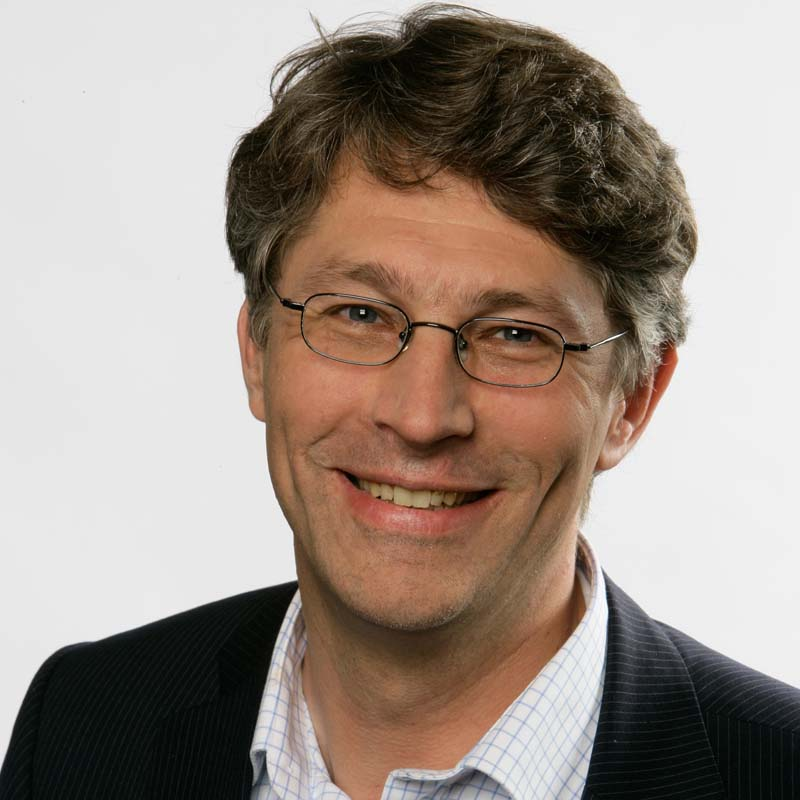
Hein Pieper in 2009

Henderikus Theodorus Maria "Hein" Pieper (born 10 May 1962) is a Dutch theologian, writer, and politician. He is dijkgraaf for the water board of Rijn en IJssel and was the chairman of New Social Contract (NSC) from 24 August to 2 October 2023. Pieper was present at the registration of NSC, saying of Omtzigt; "Pieter has exerted himself these past years for two themes that are close to my heart: good governance and social security for all inhabitants." De Gelderlander newspaper labeled Pieper "the man behind the new party of Pieter Omtzigt."

== Bibliography ==
- Tegenstroom (English: Countercurrent). 2006. ISBN 905573716X
- Waarden van het land (English: Values of the Country). With Ton Duffhues and Franck Ploum. 2009. ISBN 9025960359
- Plezier in je werk (English: Pleasure in Your Work). With Anselm Grün. 2010. ISBN 9025958990
- Boerenwijsheid (English: Farmers' Wisdom). With Grün and Duffhues. 2010. ISBN 902596107X
- Levenslessen (English: Life Lessons). With Grün, Paul Boersma, Ton Roumen, and Nico Dullemans. 2012. ISBN 9025901840
