= Eddy van Hijum =

Dutch politician (born 1972)

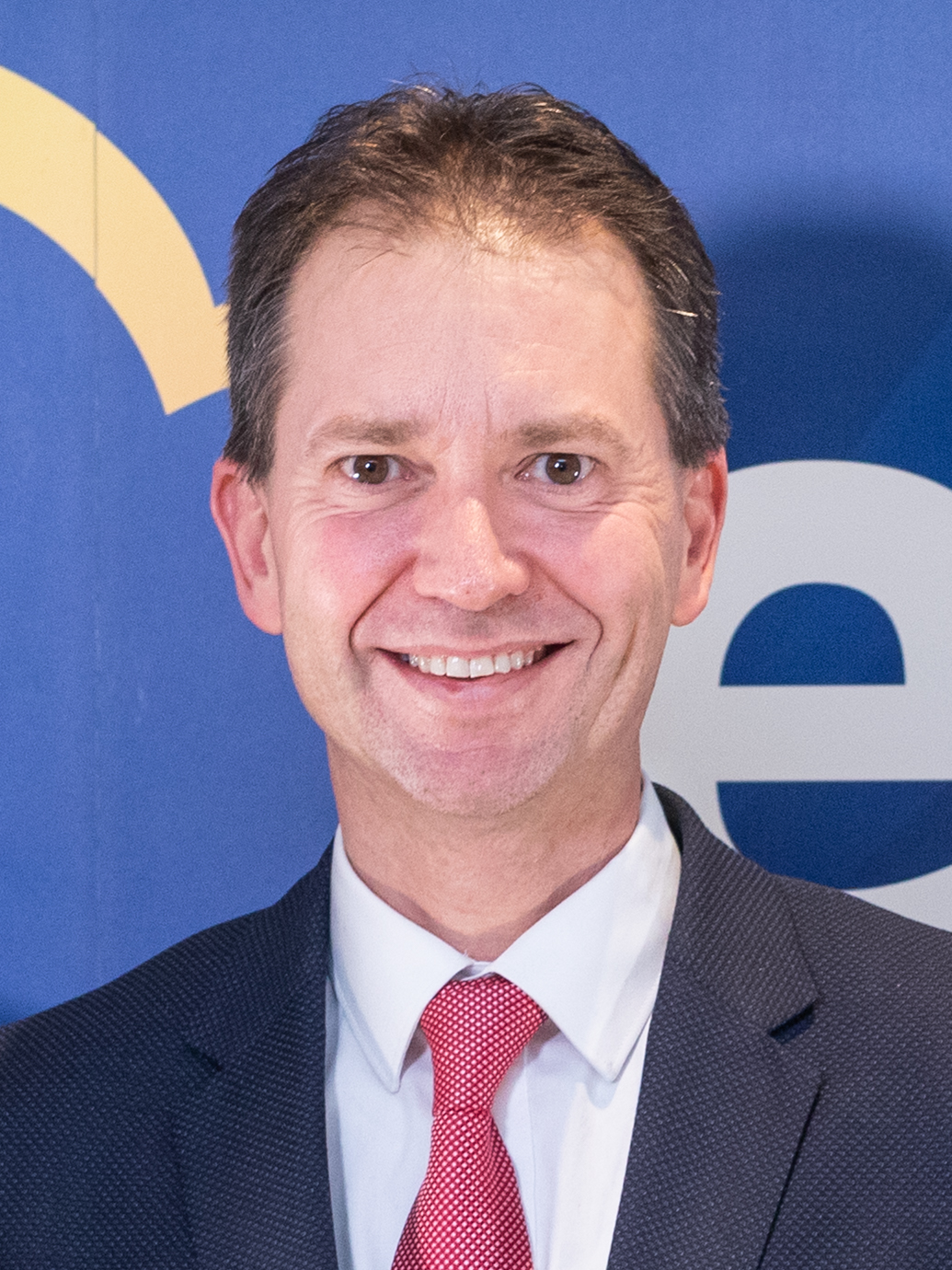
- Van Hijum in 2020

Second Deputy Prime Minister of the Netherlands
- In office 3 June 2025 – 22 August 2025
- Prime Minister: Dick Schoof
- Preceded by: Sophie Hermans
- Succeeded by: Mona Keijzer

Third Deputy Prime Minister of the Netherlands
- In office 2 July 2024 – 3 June 2025
- Prime Minister: Dick Schoof
- Preceded by: Carola Schouten
- Succeeded by: Mona Keijzer

Minister of Social Affairs and Employment
- In office 2 July 2024 – 22 August 2025
- Prime Minister: Dick Schoof
- Preceded by: Karien van Gennip
- Succeeded by: Mariëlle Paul

Minister of Health, Welfare and Sport
- In office 4 June 2025 – 19 June 2025
- Prime Minister: Dick Schoof
- Preceded by: Fleur Agema
- Succeeded by: Daniëlle Jansen

Member of the House of Representatives
- In office 2 September 2025 – 11 November 2025
- Preceded by: Diederik Boomsma
- In office 6 December 2023 – 2 July 2024
- Succeeded by: Ilse Saris
- In office 2 September 2003 – 11 November 2014
- Succeeded by: Martijn van Helvert

Member of the Provincial Executive of Overijssel
- In office 12 November 2014 – 12 July 2023

Personal details
- Born: Yde Johan van Hijum; 17 April 1972 (age 54) Delft, Netherlands
- Party: NSC (since 2023)
- Other political affiliations: CDA (1989–2023)
- Children: 3
- Education: University of Twente (PhD)

Yde Johan "Eddy" van Hijum (born 17 April 1972) is a Dutch politician. He was member of the House of Representatives from 2003 until 2014 on behalf of the Christian Democratic Appeal (CDA). He switched to the Christian democratic New Social Contract, and he again served as a member of parliament between December 2023 and July 2024 and between September 2025 and November 2025. He was minister of social affairs and employment and deputy prime minister in the Schoof cabinet between 2024 and 2025.

== Political career ==
Van Hijum studied civil engineering management at the University of Twente, and he served in the municipal council of Zwolle between 1998 and 2003. As a member of the Christian Democratic Appeal, he was a member of the House of Representatives from 2 September 2003 until 11 November 2014. He focused on matters of social security, income policy, dismissal law, labor participation policy and day care. He was invested as a Knight of the Order of Orange-Nassau upon his departure from the House.

Between 12 November 2014 and 12 July 2023, Van Hijum served as member of the provincial executive of Overijssel. He held the portfolio of Economy, Energy and Innovation. In the House of Representatives he was replaced by Martijn van Helvert. He served in the States of Overijssel from 26 March 2015 to 20 May 2015.

In August 2023, Van Hijum announced that he had joined New Social Contract (NSC), the political party founded by fellow former CDA member Pieter Omtzigt, and would head the committee responsible for writing the party's manifesto ahead of the 2023 general election. Following his election to the House, Van Hijum assisted Omtzigt in talks to form a new governing coalition. He served as the NSC's spokesperson for finances and monetary policy, and he proposed the creation of a budget review body that would advise the House, similar to the American Congressional Budget Office.

=== Minister of Social Affairs and Employment ===
After the PVV, VVD, NSC, and BBB formed the Schoof cabinet, Van Hijum was sworn in as Third Deputy Prime Minister and as Minister of Social Affairs and Employment on 2 July 2024. In the latter position, he succeeded Karien van Gennip.

Van Hijum was tasked with facilitating talks between unions and employers' associations to create a permanent early retirement scheme for workers in physically demanding occupations. A temporary scheme neared expiration, and earlier negotiations about its extension had stalled. Unions organized strikes, and they rejected Van Hijum's initial proposal, which included €250 in additional tax-favorable monthly payments to bridge the three years until retirement, a maximum yearly income, and a cap on the number of participants. An agreement was reached in October 2024 on a scheme that was described as more generous than its predecessor. It offered up to €300 in additional payments, and it did not include an income cap. While aiming to keep new participants below 15,000 annually, no strict limit was set, and sectors would have to define physically demanding occupations in collective bargaining agreements.

In September 2024, EenVandaag and the Algemeen Dagblad revealed that spot checks within the Employee Insurance Agency (UWV) had shown that a significant portion of occupational disability benefit recipients had received either too high or too low payments. The reporting concluded that the organization's leadership had ignored these signals since at least 2020 and that quality control had been scaled back instead. The UWV disclosed that 25,000–50,000 of the 200,000 recipients were affected, and Van Hijum pledged to establish a new department to oversee the rectification process. A similar scandal concerning childcare benefits had resulted in the resignation of the third Rutte cabinet in 2022.

=== Minister of Health, Welfare and Sport and return to the House ===
After the PVV quit the Schoof cabinet Eddy van Hijum was temporarily appointed Minister of Health, Welfare and Sport combining this with his tasks as Minister for Social Affairs and Employment. After two weeks of discussions between the remaining coalition partners VVD, NSC and BBB Daniëlle Jansen (NSC) was appointed as his permanent successor on the 19th of June 2025. Van Hijum resigned on 22 August 2025, when NSC left the Schoof cabinet, and he was sworn into the House of Representatives on 2 September. His term ended on 11 November 2025, following a general election.

== Electoral history ==
Electoral history of Eddy van Hijum
Year	Body	Party	Pos.	Votes	Result		Ref.
Year	Body	Party	Pos.	Votes	Party seats	Individual	Ref.
2002	House of Representatives	Christian Democratic Appeal	50/55 (Note: Van Hijum was his party's 50th candidate in electoral district 4 (Overijssel) and his party's 55th candidate in districts 8 (Utrecht), 17 (western North Brabant), 18 (eastern North Brabant), and 19 (Limburg). He was not on the ballot in all others.)	408	43	Lost	
2003	House of Representatives	Christian Democratic Appeal	53	247	44	Lost (Note: Van Hijum was appointed to the body later during the term due to a vacancy.)	
2006	House of Representatives	Christian Democratic Appeal	20	1,422	41	Won	
2010	House of Representatives	Christian Democratic Appeal	14	1,142	21	Won	
2012	House of Representatives	Christian Democratic Appeal	6	2,719	13	Won	
2023	House of Representatives	New Social Contract	6	3,457	20	Won	
2025	House of Representatives	New Social Contract	1	22,066	0	Lost	

== Notes ==
Political offices
Preceded by Karien van Gennip	Minister of Social Affairs and Employment; 2024–2025
Preceded by Rob Jetten, Karien van Gennip, and Carola Schouten	Deputy Prime Minister; 2024–2025; Served alongside: Fleur Agema, Sophie Hermans, and Mona Keijzer
