= Frank Rijkaart =

Dutch politician (born 1978)

Minister of the Interior and Kingdom Relations
- In office 5 September 2025 – 22 February 2026
- Cabinet: Schoof
- Preceded by: Judith Uitermark
- Succeeded by: Pieter Heerma

Member of the Provincial Executive of South Holland
- In office 6 July 2023 – 5 September 2025

Member of the Bodegraven-Reeuwijk Municipal Council
- In office March 2018 – July 2023

Personal details
- Born: 7 January 1978 (age 48) Leiden, Netherlands
- Party: BBB
- Other political affiliations: VVD (until 2021); Lokaal Liberaal Bodegraven-Reeuwijk
- Children: 2
- Occupation: Politician

Frank Rijkaart (Dutch: [ˈfrɑŋk ˈrɛikaːrt]; born 7 January 1978) is a Dutch politician of the Farmer–Citizen Movement (BBB), who served as the minister of the interior and kingdom relations between September 2025 and February 2026.

== Early life and career ==
He was born in 1978 in Leiden. He started his career in the Royal Netherlands Army in 1996, and he later worked for the police and for the Zadkine Safety & Security Academy. Rijkaart became a member of the conservative-liberal People's Party for Freedom and Democracy (VVD), and he joined the administration and finance committee of the Bodegraven-Reeuwijk Municipal Council in 2014. He was elected to the council in March 2018, but he left the VVD ahead of the 2022 municipal elections to join the new party Lokaal Liberaal Bodegraven-Reeuwijk, which had been founded by two former VVD members. He left the municipal council in July 2023 to become a member of the Provincial Executive of South Holland on behalf of the BBB. His portfolio contained the nitrogen crisis, agriculture, fisheries, and the Groene Hart.

On 5 September 2025, Rijkaart was appointed minister of the interior and kingdom relations in the demissionary Schoof cabinet, following the resignation of Judith Uitermark when her party left the government.

== Personal life ==
As of 2025, Rijkaart lived with his partner, and he had two children.

Political offices
Preceded by Judith Uitermark	Minister of the Interior and Kingdom Relations; 2025–2026	Succeeded by Pieter Heerma
