= Eugène Heijnen =

Dutch politician (born 1964)

State Secretary for Tax Affairs, the Tax Administration and Customs
- Incumbent
- Assumed office 5 September 2025
- Minister: Eelco Heinen
- Cabinet: Schoof
- Preceded by: Tjebbe van Oostenbruggen

Member of the Senate
- In office 13 June 2023 – 5 September 2025
- Succeeded by: Pim Walenkamp

Member of the Provincial Council of Limburg
- In office 29 March 2023 – 11 June 2023

Personal details
- Born: Eugène Henry Jos Heijnen; 22 July 1964 (age 62) Heerlen, Netherlands
- Party: Farmer–Citizen Movement
- Children: 2
- Education: Tilburg University
- Occupation: Politician; tax consultant

Eugène Henry Jos Heijnen (Dutch: [øːˈʒɛn ˈɦɛinə(n)]; born 22 July 1964) is a Dutch tax consultant and politician of the Farmer–Citizen Movement (BBB), who serves as state secretary for tax affairs, the Tax Administration and customs.

== Career ==
He was born in 1964 in Heerlen, and he attended Bernardinuscollege, a Heerlen secondary school. He studied tax economics at Tilburg University from 1982 until 1988, and he worked as a tax consultant for PwC, Ernst & Young, and energy company Essent. A member of BBB, he was elected to the Provincial Council of Limburg in March 2023 and to the Senate in May 2023. He left the provincial council in June 2023, while he continued to serve as chief fiscal and legal officer of a family office called Ingrosyl. He was part of the delegation of the States General to the Parliamentary Assembly of the Organization for Security and Co-operation in Europe (OSCE).

On 5 September 2025, he joined the demissionary Schoof cabinet as state secretary for tax affairs, the Tax Administration and customs, succeeding Tjebbe van Oostenbruggen whose party left the cabinet.

== Personal life ==
As of 2025, Heijnen was married, had two sons, and lived in Margraten.

Political offices
| Preceded by Tjebbe van Oostenbruggen | State Secretary for Tax Affairs, the Tax Administration and Customs; 2025–present | Incumbent |
