= A New Social Contract =

Manifesto written by Dutch politician Pieter Omtzigt

Een nieuw sociaal contract
- Author: Pieter Omtzigt; Welmoed Vlieger
- Audio read by: Lykele Muus
- Language: Dutch
- Subject: Manifesto
- Genre: Non-fiction
- Publisher: Uitgeverij Prometheus
- Publication date: 23 February 2021
- Publication place: Netherlands
- Pages: 221
- ISBN: 9789044648058

A New Social Contract (Dutch: Een nieuw sociaal contract) is a manifesto written by Dutch politician Pieter Omtzigt with a contribution by philosopher Welmoed Vlieger. It was published on 23 February 2021. When Omtzigt wrote it, he was number 2 on the candidate list of the Christian Democratic Appeal (CDA) for the 2021 Dutch general election. In the book, Omtzigt described his political vision. The book serves as the basis for the political party New Social Contract, which Omtzigt founded for the 2023 Dutch general election.

== Content ==
The lead chapter of A New Social Contract is a personal interview with Omtzigt conducted by Vlieger. This is followed by chapters on the European Union, on the use of models, and the Dutch childcare benefits scandal. Subsequently, Omtzigt argues for a new social contract in order to have more countervailing power within the government. Omtzigt makes ten proposals for this in the book, including:

- the establishment of a Dutch constitutional court vested with the power of constitutional review
- the institution of a regional electoral system
- improved social security measures
- greater use of think tanks in lieu of research institutes

== Reception ==
A New Social Contract sold 18,000 copies within two weeks.

The book appeared in the weekly rankings of The Bestseller 60 for twenty weeks in 2021, peaking in second place. It reached first place in August 2023, when the book reappeared on the list after Omtzigt had founded his eponymous political party.

A New Social Contract earned Omtzigt almost €150,000 in 2021. Omtzigt has indicated that he intends to donate the net amount – after deducting a salary and income tax – to the food bank and clothing bank in his hometown of Enschede, Overijssel.

== See also ==
- Social contract
- New Social Contract
