= Bakkeveen =

Bakkeveen Bakkefean
- Village
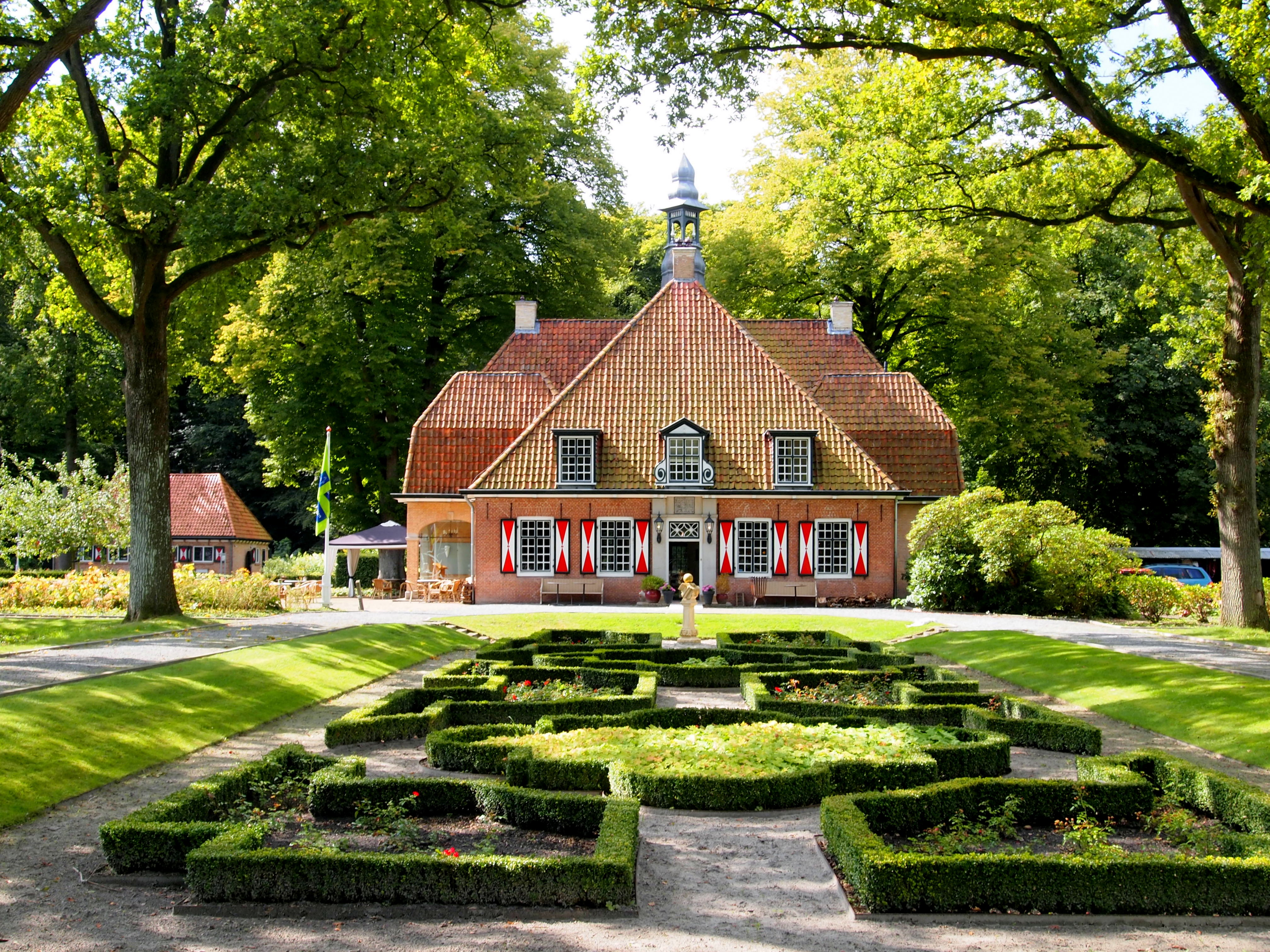
- De Slotplaats

- Flag Coat of arms

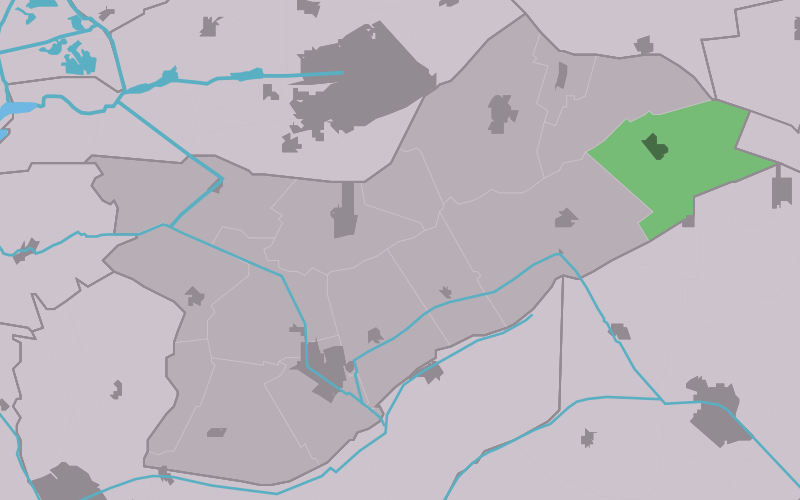
- Location in Opsterland municipality

- Location in the Netherlands Bakkeveen (Netherlands)
- Country: Netherlands
- Province: Friesland
- Municipality: Opsterland

Area
  - Total: 20.34 km^{2} (7.85 sq mi)
- Elevation: −0.3 m (−0.98 ft)

Population (2021)
  - Total: 1,905
  - Density: 93.66/km^{2} (242.6/sq mi)
- Time zone: UTC+1 (CET)
  - Summer (DST): UTC+2 (CEST)
- Postal code: 9243
- Dialing code: 0516
- Website: Official

Bakkeveen (Dutch: [bɑkəˈveːn]; West Frisian: Bakkefean [bakəˈfɪən]) is a village in the municipality of Opsterland in eastern Friesland (Fryslân) in the Netherlands. It had a population of around 1,465 in January 2017.

== History ==
The village was first mentioned in 1232-1233 as "apud Backenvene", and means "raised bog of Bakke (person)". Bakkeveen developed in the 13th century around the outpost Mariënhof of monastery Mariëngaarde in Hallum.

In 1685, the Bakkeveense vaart was dug by the Drachtster Company to exploit the peat in the region. From 1732 onwards, the houses were moved to the canal by order of Jonkheer Tjaerd van Aylva. A church was planned and a model had even been made, however it was never built.

Bakkeveen was home to 453 people in 1840. The Dutch Reformed church was finally built in 1856 in neoclassic style. The Slotplaats was a farm built in 1818. In 1922, it was transformed into an estate by Baron van Harinxma thoe Slooten. The estate has a 200 hectares (490 acres) forest. The estate was purchased by Vereniging Natuurmonumenten in 1997.

In the late-20th century, the forests and heaths attracted recreational tourism to Bakkeveen.

== Notable people ==
- Folkert Idsinga (born 1971), lawyer and politician
- Eddy Schurer (born 1964), former racing cyclist
- Riemer van der Velde (born 1940), football functionary, former chairman of SC Heerenveen

== Gallery ==
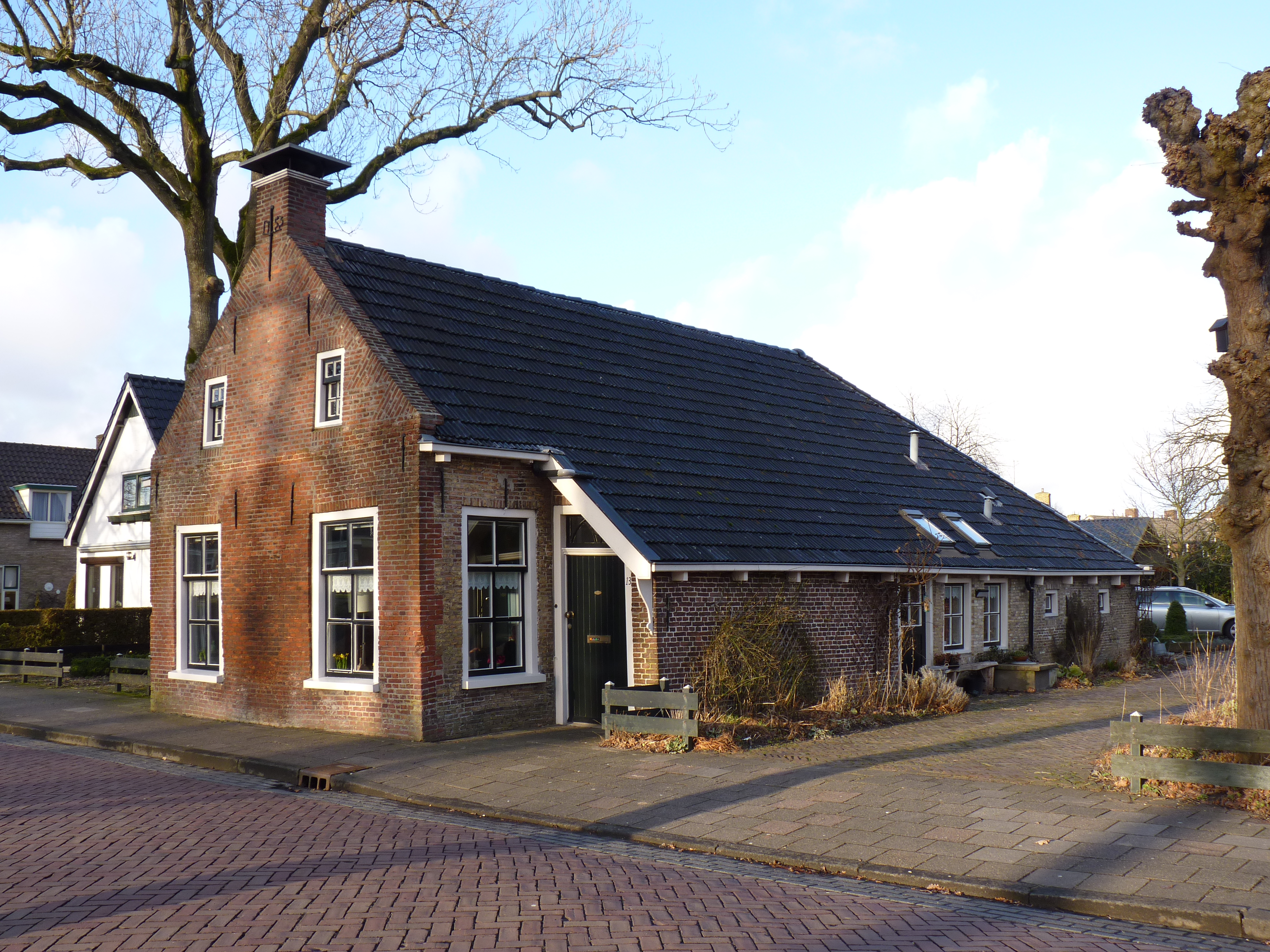
Farm turned residential home in Bakkeveen

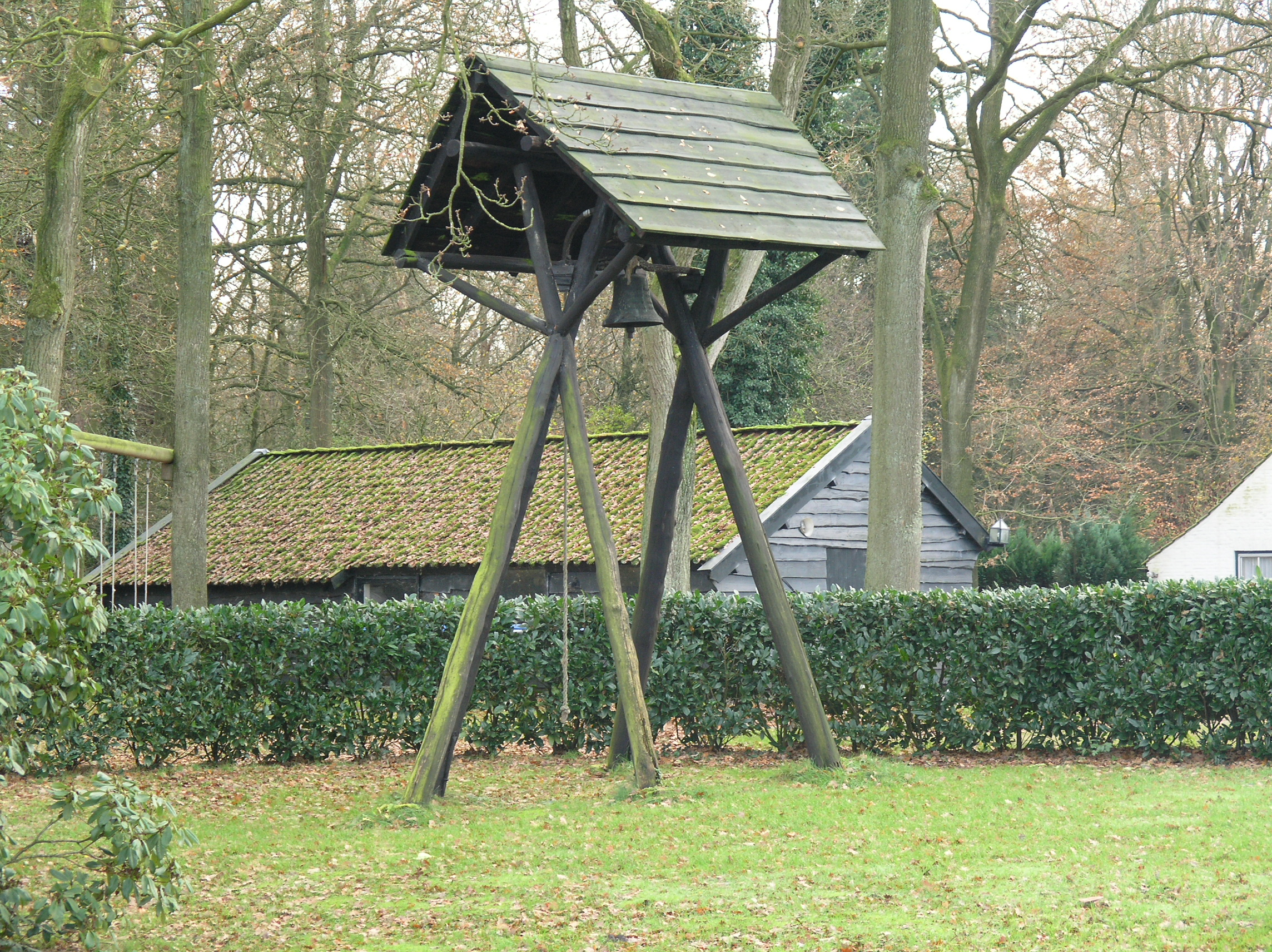
Bell tower

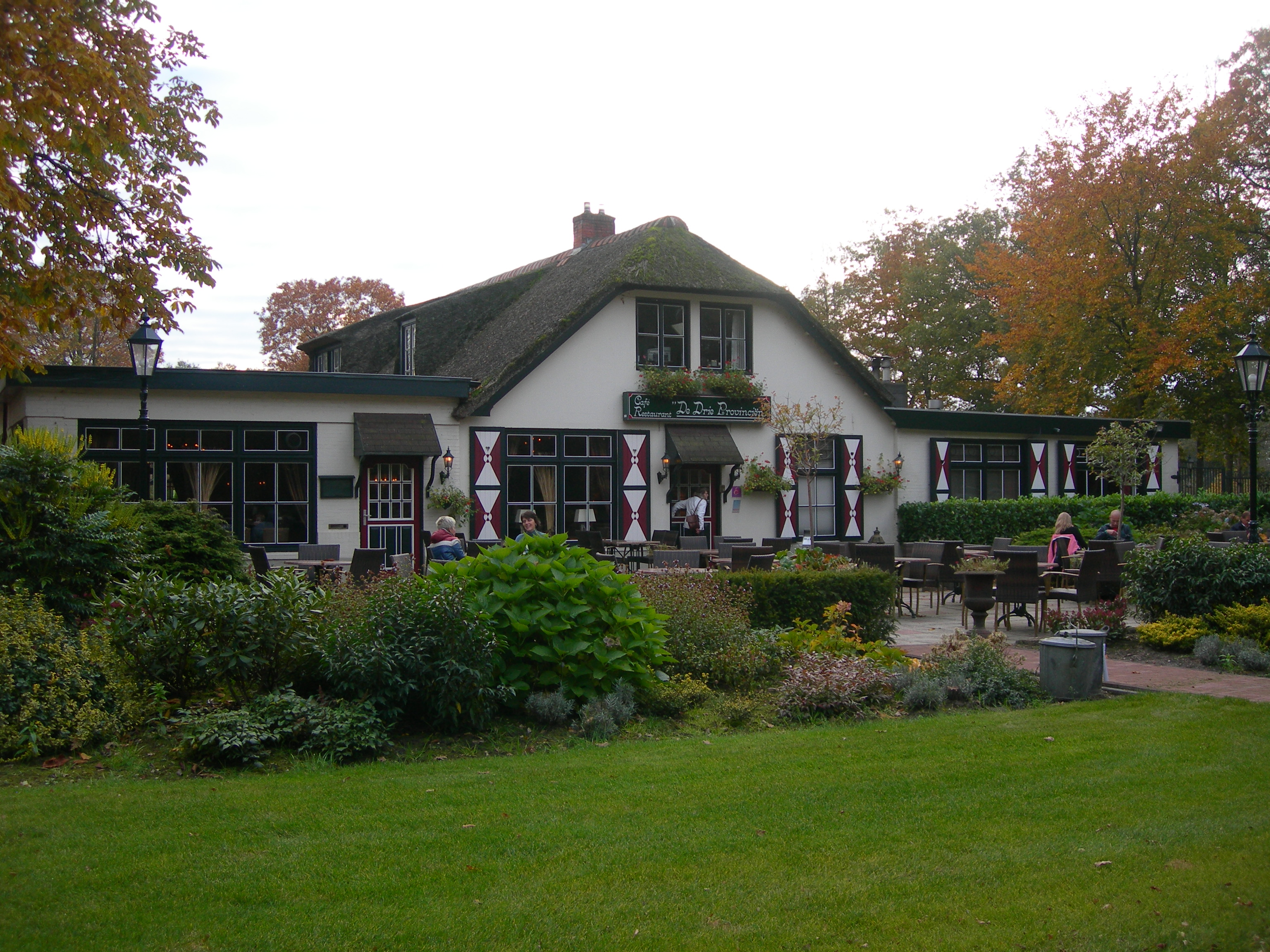
Cafe-restaurant De Drie Provinciën

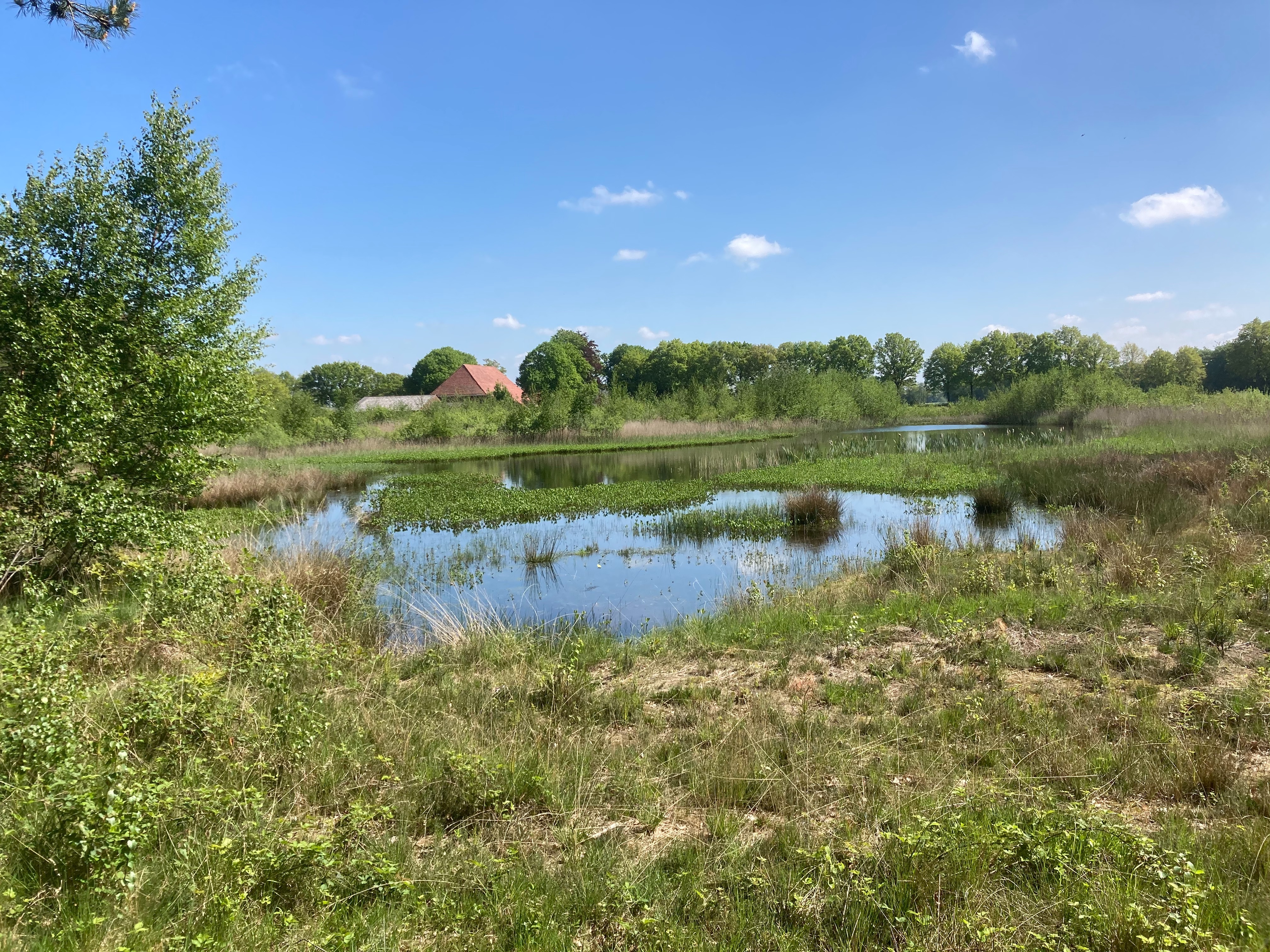
Nature near Bakkeveen
