= Wytske Postma =

Dutch politician (born 1977)

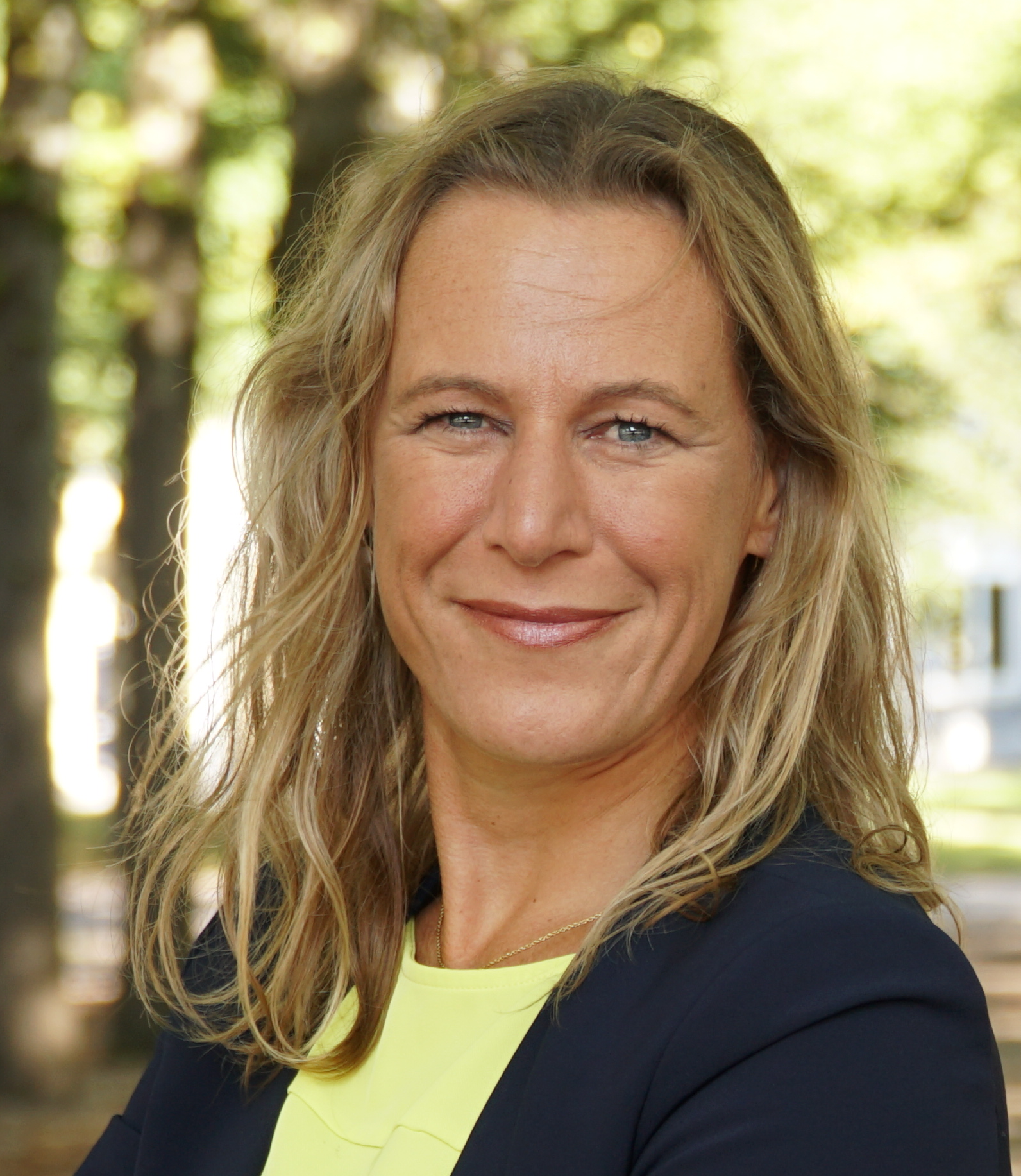
- Postma in 2020

Member of the House of Representatives
- In office 6 December 2023 – 11 November 2025
- In office 5 June 2019 – 30 March 2021

Personal details
- Born: 16 April 1977 (age 49) Hoorn, Netherlands
- Party: New Social Contract (2023–present)
- Other party: Christian Democratic Appeal (2002–2023)

Wytske Liselotte Postma (born 16 April 1977) is a Dutch politician. She served as a member of the House of Representatives for the Christian Democratic Appeal from 2019 to 2021 and for the New Social Contract from 2023 to 2025.

== Political career ==
She was the NSC's spokesperson for climate, energy, economic affairs, mining, and aviation. In 2023, she was appointed acting chair of the Infrastructure and Water Management Committee. At Postma's urging, State Secretary Jurgen Nobel promised to extend a scheme reimbursing energy costs for low-income households, established in response to the global energy crisis, into 2025. However, Nobel failed to reach an agreement with energy suppliers and civil society organizations about its funding.

== Electoral history ==
Electoral history of Wytske Postma
Year	Body	Party	Pos.	Votes	Result		Ref.
Year	Body	Party	Pos.	Votes	Party seats	Individual	Ref.
2017	House of Representatives	Christian Democratic Appeal	22	1,779	19	Lost (Note: Postma was appointed to the body later during the term due to a vacancy.)	
2021	House of Representatives	Christian Democratic Appeal	19	3,131	15	Lost	
2023	House of Representatives	New Social Contract	11	1,169	20	Won	
