= Coşkun Çörüz =

Dutch politician (born 1963)

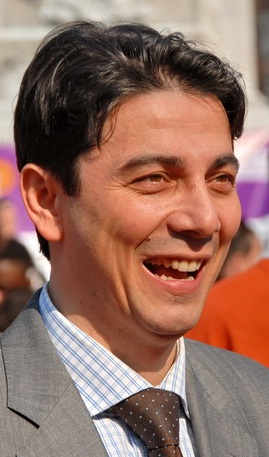
- Çörüz in 2007

Member of the House of Representatives
- In office 29 May 2001 – 19 September 2012

Personal details
- Born: 15 August 1963 (age 63) Konakören, Salıpazarı, Turkey
- Citizenship: Netherlands; Turkey
- Party: Christian Democratic Appeal
- Spouse: Judith Uitermark
- Children: 2
- Education: University of Amsterdam (LLM)
- Occupation: Lawyer • Politician
- Awards: Order of Orange-Nassau

Coşkun Çörüz (born 15 August 1963) is a Turkish-born Dutch politician. As a member of the Christian Democratic Appeal, he was an MP from 29 May 2001 to 20 September 2012. He focused on matters of security policy, judiciary, police, international law and human rights.

Çörüz was born in the Turkish district Salıpazarı. He studied law at the University of Amsterdam and was a member of the municipal council of Haarlem from 1998 to 2001. From May 2001 to September 2012 he was a member of the Dutch House of Representatives. He was a board member of the organisation SOTA in 2003, which is said to be affiliated with the Grey Wolves, but he denied knowingly being a board member and said he wanted to be removed.

Upon his departure from the House of Representatives on September 19, 2012, Çörüz was appointed a Knight in the Order of Orange-Nassau. He works for the Center for International Child Abduction, where he is the director.

Çörüz met his wife Judith Uitermark while living in Haarlem. They both served simultaneously on its municipal council for the CDA, and Uitermark became Minister of the Interior and Kingdom Relations in 2024.

== Decorations ==
- Knight of the Order of Orange-Nassau.
