= Karien van Gennip =

Dutch politician (born 1968)

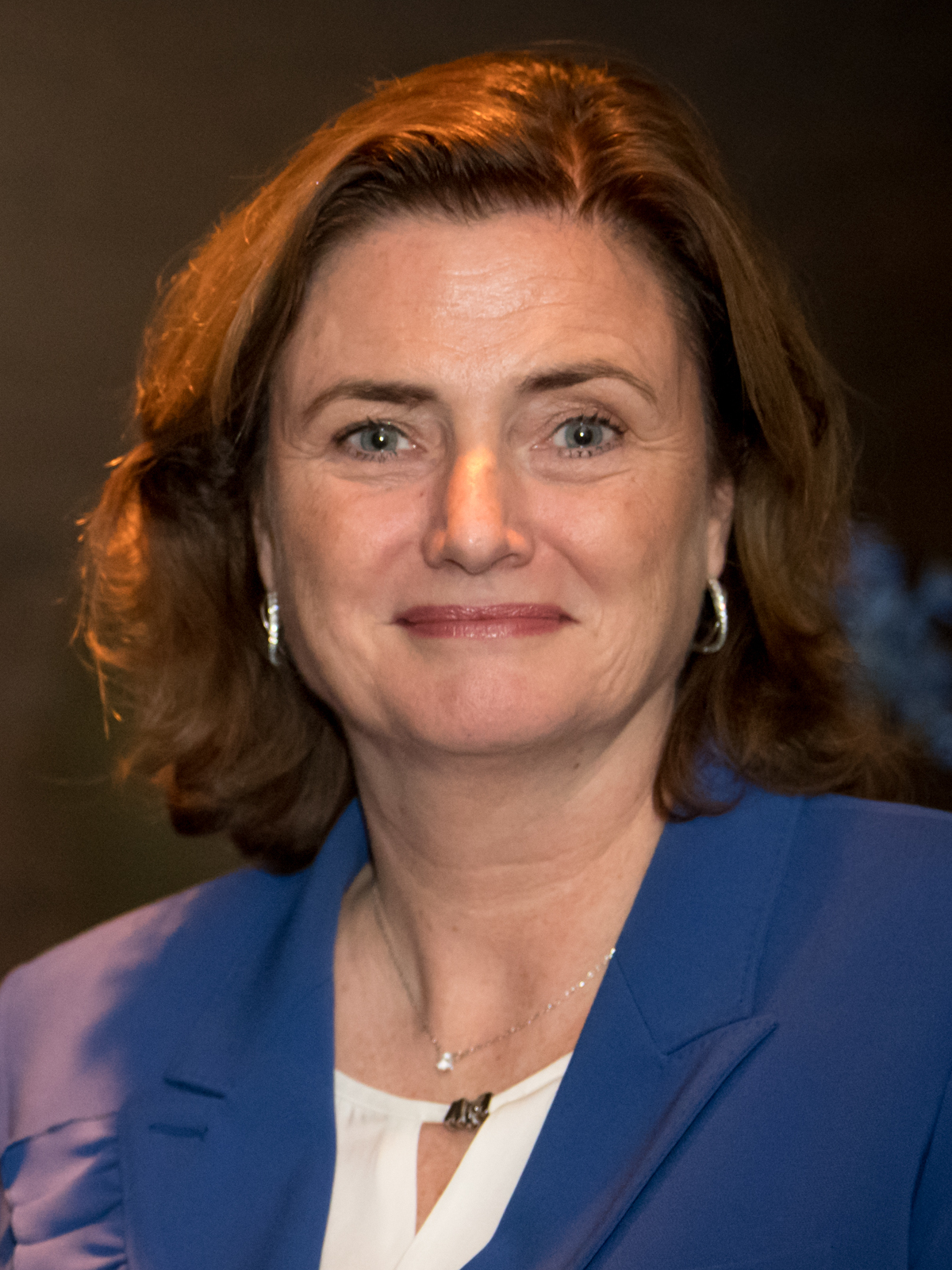
- Van Gennip in 2023

Second Deputy Prime Minister of the Netherlands
- In office 5 September 2023 – 2 July 2024
- Prime Minister: Mark Rutte
- Preceded by: Wopke Hoekstra
- Succeeded by: Sophie Hermans

Minister of Social Affairs and Employment
- In office 10 January 2022 – 2 July 2024
- Prime Minister: Mark Rutte
- Preceded by: Wouter Koolmees
- Succeeded by: Eddy van Hijum

State Secretary for Economic Affairs
- In office 27 May 2003 – 22 February 2007
- Prime Minister: Jan Peter Balkenende
- Preceded by: Joop Wijn
- Succeeded by: Frank Heemskerk

Member of the House of Representatives
- In office 30 November 2006 – 3 September 2008

Personal details
- Born: Catharina Elisabeth Godefrida van Gennip; 3 October 1968 (age 58) Leidschendam, Netherlands
- Party: Christian Democratic Appeal
- Parent: Jos van Gennip (father)
- Education: Delft University of Technology; INSEAD

Catharina Elisabeth Godefrida "Karien" van Gennip (born 3 October 1968) is a Dutch businesswoman and politician who served as Minister of Social Affairs and Employment in the Fourth Rutte cabinet from 10 January 2022 until 2 July 2024. She is a member of the Christian Democratic Appeal (CDA).

A native of Leidschendam, Karien van Gennip worked at McKinsey & Company and the Netherlands Authority for the Financial Markets until she entered politics when she was appointed State Secretary for Economic Affairs in 2003 under Jan Peter Balkenende's second cabinet, a position she retained under his third cabinet until 2007. In the 2006 general election, she was elected to the House of Representatives. She resigned in 2008 to continue her business career at ING until her return to politics in 2022.

== Early life and education ==
Karien van Gennip is the daughter of Jos van Gennip (born 1939), who was elected to the Senate from 1991 to 2007 as a Christian Democrat. She studied applied physics at Delft University of Technology and obtained an MBA at INSEAD Fontainebleau.

== Early career ==
Van Gennip worked at McKinsey & Company in Amsterdam and San Francisco, and as project leader reorganisation at the Netherlands Authority for the Financial Markets.

== Political career ==
From 2003 to 2007 Van Gennip was State Secretary of Economic Affairs in the second and third Balkenende cabinet, and from 2006 to 2008 she was a member of the House of Representatives.

About her maternity leave during her position as a State Secretary, Van Gennip wrote a column in women's magazine Margriet.

Van Gennip is also a notable member of Young Global Leaders, created by Klaus Schwab, founder and former executive chairman of the World Economic Forum.

== Return to the private sector ==
In 2008 Van Gennip was appointed Director European & International Affairs for ING Group. She left ING in 2020.

In 2017, Van Gennip was elected as Vice-Chair of the International Chamber of Commerce (ICC), the first time a woman has ever held this position.

From 2020 to 2022, Van Gennip worked as CEO of Coöperatie VGZ, one of the largest healthcare insurance companies in the Netherlands.

== Other activities ==
TomTom, Member of the Supervisory Board (2021–2022)

== Sources ==
- (in Dutch) Parlement.com biography
