= Riemer van der Velde =

Dutch football functionary (born 1940)

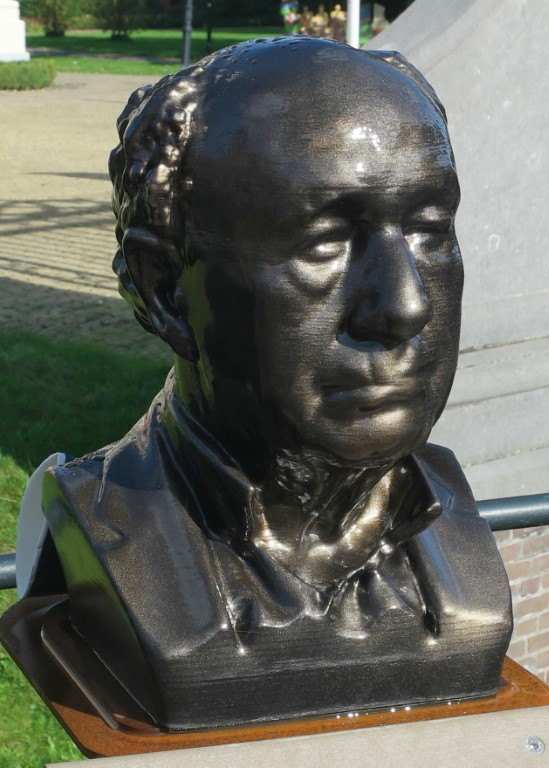

Riemer van der Velde (born 28 October 1940 in Bakkeveen) is a Dutch football functionary, who was a chairman of Dutch football club SC Heerenveen. He was in charge of the club for 23 years before resigning on 1 October 2006.

At the time Van der Velde became chairman of SC Heerenveen in 1983 the club had many debts and was an anonymous club in the Eerste Divisie. He realized to get rid of the debts before appointing Foppe de Haan as the club's manager, who was at the time coaching amateur side FC Steenwijk.

Van der Velde and De Haan became a close duo from 1985 to 2004, although De Haan was replaced as a manager in 1988 and was given another job at the club. In the upcoming seasons a few other managers were not able to improve Heerenveen's football potential until Fritz Korbach, who previously managed FC Wageningen, PEC Zwolle, FC Volendam and FC Twente towards the Eredivisie, also managed Heerenveen to the highest level of Dutch football. After Heerenveen relegated the following season and were not able to promote again immediately Korbach was fired and De Haan got his former job as a manager back.

Heerenveen then reached the final of the KNVB Cup (losing 6-2 to Ajax) and promoted back to the Eredivisie. Since then Heerenveen played continuously at the highest level and even became one of the most important teams. The club qualified for several European tournaments, including the UEFA Champions League. De Haan resigned in 2004 to become manager of the Netherlands national under-21 football team and was replaced by Gertjan Verbeek.

As of August 2006 Van der Velde started his 23rd season as Heerenveen's chairman and he was along with his wife Annie named in the Order of Orange-Nassau on 29 September, just one day after Heerenveen qualified for the UEFA Cup groups stage and just two days before resigning as Heerenveen's chairman during the match versus PSV Eindhoven on 1 October.

Van der Velde was succeeded by Koos Formsma
