= Koos Formsma =

Koos Formsma (born 1957 in Leeuwarden, Friesland) is a Dutch businessman and former chairman of Dutch football club SC Heerenveen. A former field hockey player from HC Bloemendaal, Formsma became the club's chairman on 1 October 2006 after Riemer van der Velde resigned his 23-year spell at the team. Formsma was also director of the company Regma Nederland, located in Lelystad, which he sold to Canon in 2012.
