= Nicolien van Vroonhoven =

Dutch politician (born 1971)

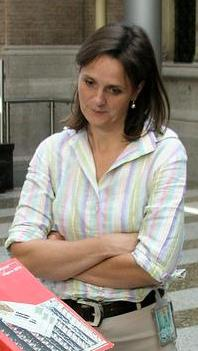
- Van Vroonhoven in 2009

Leader of the New Social Contract
- In office 19 April 2025 – 1 September 2025
- Preceded by: Pieter Omtzigt
- Succeeded by: Eddy van Hijum

Member of the House of Representatives
- In office 22 November 2023 – 11 November 2025
- In office 15 May 2002 – 17 June 2010

Alderman in Hilversum
- In office 7 May 2014 – 17 December 2017

Member of The Hague Municipal council
- In office 11 March 2010 – 12 September 2011

Personal details
- Born: Jennifer Nicolien Kok; 9 April 1971 (age 55) Bussum, Netherlands
- Party: NSC (2023–present)
- Other political affiliations: CDA (1997–2023)
- Spouse: Taco van Vroonhoven (m. 1999)
- Children: 5
- Education: Leiden University; University of Amsterdam
- Occupation: Tax advisor • Politician

Jennifer Nicolien van Vroonhoven-Kok (born 9 April 1971) is a Dutch politician who led the New Social Contract in 2025. She was the second candidate of New Social Contract in the 2023 general election. From 2002 to 2010, she held a seat in the House on behalf of the Christian Democratic Appeal (CDA). From 2010 to 2011, she was a member of the municipal council of The Hague and from 7 May 2014 to 17 December 2017 she was an alderman in the municipality of Hilversum, both for CDA.

== Early life and CDA ==
Van Vroonhoven was born in Bussum. After attending high school at the Gemeentelijk Gymnasium in Hilversum between 1983 and 1989, she went to Leiden University, where she received an MA degree in Art history in 1994 and an LLM degree in International law in 1995. Subsequently, she studied at the University of Amsterdam, where she obtained an LLM in Tax Law in 2000. During this study, she worked briefly as a junior tax advisor at Arthur Andersen & Co. In 1997, she became a finance policy officer for Dutch politician Jan Peter Balkenende of the CDA (who later served as Prime Minister of the Netherlands). Van Vroonhoven introduced Pieter Omtzigt to Balkenende in 2002. On 23 May 2002, Van Vroonhoven entered the Dutch House of Representatives. She was a tax spokesperson and was involved in cultural policy and starting entrepreneurs. Between 13 May and 17 August 2008, she was temporarily replaced as Member of Parliament by Ine Aasted-Madsen. She was not a candidate in the 2010 Dutch general election so her membership of the House ended on 17 June 2010. Between 11 March 2010, and the end of 2011 she sat for the CDA in the municipal council of The Hague.

Van Vroonhoven speaking on the centennial of Hilversum in 2015.

From 7 May 2014 to 17 December 2017, Van Vroonhoven was an alderman in the municipality of Hilversum. Her portfolio included housing and land affairs, nature, environment and sustainability and historic preservation. She resigned from her position on 17 December 2017; her husband had found a job in Melbourne, Australia and the entire Van Vroonhoven family emigrated with them. They returned in 2022.

== New Social Contract ==
Van Vroonhoven returned to the Netherlands in 2022. She helped Omtzigt establish the New Social Contract (NSC) party in the summer of 2023, and she canceled her CDA membership. She became an employee of NSC and served as a spokesperson. Placed second on the party list, she was elected in the 2023 Dutch general election, and she returned to the parliament after more than a decade. Van Vroonhoven is the NSC's vice parliamentary leader and its spokesperson for justice, security, culture, and labor market. She assisted Pieter Omtzigt and Eddy van Hijum in formation talks for the Schoof cabinet, and the NRC newspaper described Van Vroonhoven as Omtzigt's emotional support. Following the cabinet's swearing in, Van Vroonhoven's portfolio changed to taxation, media, and culture.

=== Acting parliamentary leader ===
She took over Omtzigt's leadership responsibilities after he announced his temporary retreat in September 2024, ahead of the yearly General Political Debate. Van Vroonhoven noted that her party's support for the use of emergency powers to implement asylum measures, as outlined in the coalition agreement, was contingent on a positive advice of the Council of State. During the General Political Debate, she helped opposition parties secure a majority in demanding the release of official documents on the plan's legal viability, referring to the parliament's right to information under Article 68 of the Constitution of the Netherlands. Documents of the Ministry of the Interior and Kingdom Relations showed that civil servants had advised against using emergency legislation, contending that the asylum situation was unlikely to meet the threshold for exceptional circumstances. After Party for Freedom (PVV) leader Geert Wilders stressed that the cabinet would be in trouble if no emergency law would be enacted, Prime Minister Dick Schoof facilitated negotiations between Van Vroonhoven and Wilders in October 2024. The four coalition parties reached an agreement on asylum measures on 25 October, abandoning the use of emergency powers.

On 15 November 2024, State Secretary Nora Achahbar of NSC announced her resignation. Reports circulated of offensive, radical, and potentially racist remarks made during a Council of Ministers meeting, in which Amsterdam attacks targeting supporters of the Israeli football club Maccabi Tel Aviv F.C. were discussed. Prime Minister Dick Schoof said after the meeting that the attacks pointed to a broader integration issue, and State Secretary Jurgen Nobel stated that a significant portion of Islamic youth did not endorse Dutch norms and values, referring to the perpetrators. Following Achahbar's resignation, Van Vroonhoven was invited to crisis talks with the other coalition leaders and the cabinet to avert a collapse. They agreed that no other cabinet members of NSC would step down, and Van Vroonhoven affirmed that no racist comments had been made by cabinet members. Following a meeting of NSC's parliamentary group, Van Vroonhoven announced that Rosanne Hertzberger and Femke Zeedijk would step down in Achahbar's support.

Omtzigt started a phased return to the House in late November. Van Vroonhoven would temporarily share the role of parliamentary leader with Omtzigt, remaining the primary contact for coalition leaders, handling most major debates in parliament, and serving as the main media spokesperson.

=== Parliamentary leader ===
On 18 April 2025, when Omtzigt announced his immediate withdrawal from politics, Van Vroonhoven officially became NSC's political leader. She did not run for re-election in 2025, and her term in the House ended on 11 November 2025.

== Personal life ==
Van Vroonhoven-Kok married in 1999 and has five children. She had a Dutch Reformed upbringing, and she switched to the Catholic Church in her twenties. She stayed at an Augustinian abbey in Maastricht for four months while studying.

== Electoral history ==
Electoral history of Nicolien van Vroonhoven-Kok
Year	Body	Party	Pos.	Votes	Result		Ref.
Year	Body	Party	Pos.	Votes	Party seats	Individual	Ref.
2002	House of Representatives	Christian Democratic Appeal	25	928	43	Won	
2003	House of Representatives	Christian Democratic Appeal	25	814	44	Won	
2006	House of Representatives	Christian Democratic Appeal	38	1,286	41	Won	
2023	House of Representatives	New Social Contract	2	44,045	20	Won	
