= New Social Contract =

Political party in the Netherlands

New Social Contract Nieuw Sociaal Contract
- Abbreviation: NSC
- Chairperson: Ronald de Bruin (acting)
- Founder: Pieter Omtzigt
- Founded: 19 August 2023; 3 years ago
- Split from: Christian Democratic Appeal
- Youth wing: Jong Sociaal Contract
- Membership (2026): ▼2,033
- Ideology: Christian democracy; Social conservatism; Anti-establishment
- Political position: Centre to centre-right
- Regional affiliation: Christian Group
- European Parliament group: European People's Party Group (2024-2026)
- Colours: Dark blue Yellow
- Senate: 0 / 75
- House of Representatives: 0 / 150
- European Parliament: 0 / 31
- Benelux Parliament: 0 / 21

Website
- partijnieuwsociaalcontract.nl

New Social Contract (Dutch: Nieuw Sociaal Contract [niu soːˈɕaːl kɔnˈtrɑkt], NSC) is a Christian-democratic political party in the Netherlands founded by Pieter Omtzigt in 2023.

== History ==
In early 2021, Omtzigt wrote the manifesto A New Social Contract, with ideas for the Christian Democratic Appeal (CDA), the party for which he served in the House of Representatives at the time. After a falling out with his party over the appointment of Wopke Hoekstra as party leader and the "Position Omtzigt, function elsewhere" note that leaked during the 2021–2022 cabinet formation, he split from the CDA in June 2021 and continued as a one-man parliamentary group in September of that year.

After the 2023 Dutch general election was announced following the fall of the fourth Rutte cabinet, Omtzigt founded New Social Contract (NSC) on 19 August 2023. His 2021 manifesto is the basis for the new party's program. On 20 August 2023, Omtzigt announced in Tubantia newspaper that he did not strive for NSC to become the largest party in the general election in November that year. If that does happen, he did not want to become prime minister, but to remain in the House of Representatives as parliamentary leader. After the party's candidate list was presented, Omtzigt no longer ruled out premiership.

CDA prominent Eddy van Hijum became chairman of the committee that would write the party's manifesto ahead of the 2023 general election. Former VVD hopeful Onno Aerden was introduced as the party's spokesperson on 12 September 2023, but he stepped down a few hours later when a tweet resurfaced in which he had referred to the Farmer–Citizen Movement (BBB) as "a tumor that destroys the fragile democracy from within". On 2 October, NSC announced the resignation of its co-founder and inaugural chairman Hein Pieper, after the revelation of a past allegation of abuse of power. Until 28 August 2023, the party offered people who endorsed the party's principles the opportunity to apply online for a seat in the House of Representatives. It was later announced that around 2,400 candidates had registered. NSC presented a list of 44 candidates on 26 September 2023. It includes several former members of parliament, such as Nicolien van Vroonhoven-Kok, Eddy van Hijum, Wytske Postma, and Folkert Idsinga, as well as people without political experience, including a judge, a pensions expert, a public prosecutor, a former ambassador, a microbiologist/columnist, a director of a housing corporation, civil servants, and businesspeople.

NSC won twenty seats in the 22 November general election, entering the House as the fourth largest party, while the right-wing populist Party for Freedom (PVV) received a plurality. Omtzigt had told during the campaign that NSC would be unwilling to form a coalition government with the PVV and Forum for Democracy (FvD), as he felt they did not meet the "basic conditions of the rule of law". Following government formation talks with the PVV, VVD, and BBB, Omtzigt left open the possibility for an extraparliamentary cabinet. The four parties struck a coalition agreement in May 2024 after Omtzigt had once stepped out of the talks due to concerns about government finances.

Following Omtzigt's retirement from politics in 2025 citing health concerns, former parliamentary leader Nicolien van Vroonhoven became the party's new leader and lijsttrekker for the next election. In June 2025, she stood down triggering a leadership contest. The party's former migration spokesman Diederik Boomsma stood as a candidate but withdrew after the party board chose to replace Van Vroonhoven with Van Hijum, who was put forward as lead candidate for the 2025 Dutch general election. It was later revealed Boomsma had switched his affiliation to JA21 after his name appeared on JA21's electoral list. In the election the party was completely wiped out, losing all their seats. Van Hijum left as party leader in January 2026.

In October 2026, MEP Dirk Gotink would leave the party over its decision to explore collaboration with Eurosceptic politician Mona Keijzer, leaving the NSC without representation in the European Parliament.

== Ideology and positions ==
NSC has been described as centre to centre-right, anti-establishment, Christian democratic, social conservatism, and close to communitarian philosophy. Article 2 of the party's statutes speak of "personal responsibility, family and communities and distributed private property" as founding principles, while an accompanying programme of principles mentions notions including personalism, virtue ethics and the social market economy. The party is also critical of neoliberalism and believes that neoliberal tendencies in Dutch economy should be reined in.

"Good governance" and "social security" are the party's primary concerns. Policies regarding good governance include the establishment of a constitutional court and instituting a regional electoral system similar to that of Sweden.

While the NSC has been compared to the centre-left GroenLinks–PvdA alliance on economic issues, the party has a more conservative attitude towards immigration. Omtzigt proposed a two-status system that would apply different admission criteria to asylum seekers and economic migrants.

In 2024, the NSC voted in favour of a motion tabled in the House of Representatives by the Reformed Political Party (SGP) to abolish the so-called "transgender law" which had been brought in under the previous Dutch government and would enable people under the age of 16 to legally change their gender without a verdict from a doctor. In a statement, the party said "We are absolutely not against changing sex, but it should not be too easy either" and argued that changes in the law would create loopholes allowing male criminals to access women's prisons.

== Electorate ==
According to market researcher I&O Research, NSC attracts voters from parties across the political spectrum, including the Socialist Party, JA21, BBB, and PVV. Polls in late August 2023 showed that it was the most popular party, with 40% of its electorate coming from BBB, reducing that party's vote share by more than a third.

== Leadership ==
=== Party leader ===
- Pieter Omtzigt (20 August 2023 – 18 April 2025)
- Nicolien van Vroonhoven (19 April – 1 September 2025)
- Eddy van Hijum (2 September 2025 – 24 January 2026)

=== Party chair ===
- Hein Pieper (24 August 2023 – 2 October 2023)
- Bert van Boggelen (acting, 2 October 2023 – 31 July 2024)
- Kilian Wawoe (December 2024 – 6 September 2025)
- Reinout van Malenstein (6 September 2025 - 18 July 2026)
- Ronald de Bruin (acting, from 18 July 2026)

== Electoral results ==
=== House of Representatives ===
Election	Lead candidate	List	Votes	%	Seats	+/–	Government
2023	Pieter Omtzigt	List	1,343,287	12.88	20 / 150	New	Coalition; Schoof cabinet
2025	Eddy van Hijum	List	39,408	0.37	0 / 150	▼20	No seats

=== European Parliament ===
Election	List	Votes	%	Seats	+/–	EP Group
2024	List	233,564	3.75	1 / 31	New	EPP

== See also ==
- A New Social Contract
- Social contract
