= Pieter Omtzigt =

Dutch former politician (born 1974)

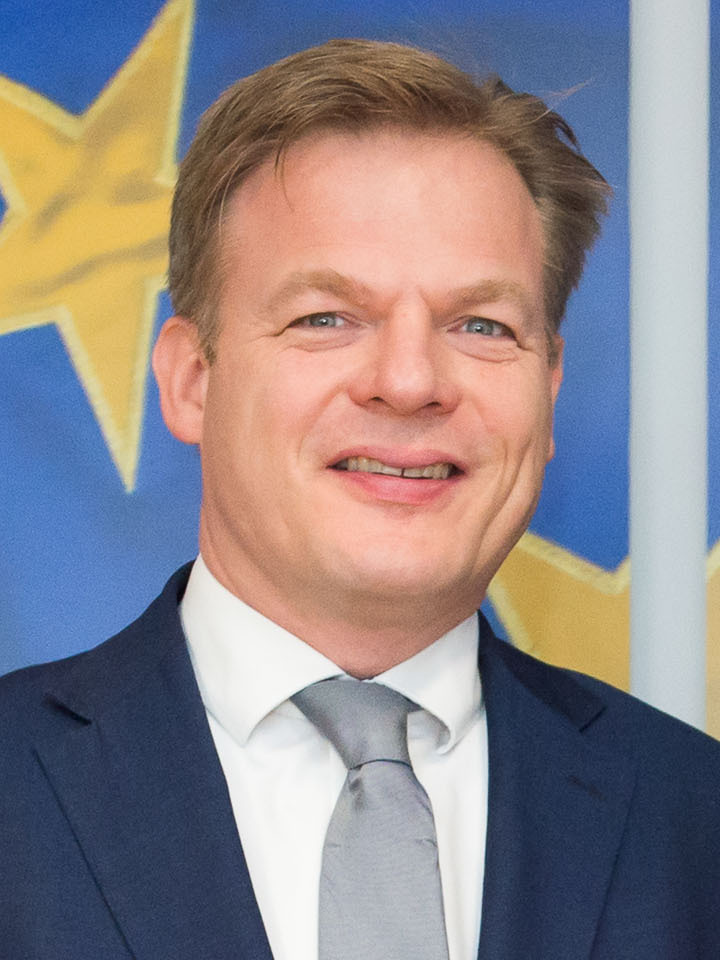
- Omtzigt in 2019

Leader of the New Social Contract
- In office 19 August 2023 – 18 April 2025
- Preceded by: Position established
- Succeeded by: Nicolien van Vroonhoven

Member of the House of Representatives
- In office 15 September 2021 – 13 May 2025
- In office 26 October 2010 – 12 June 2021
- In office 3 June 2003 – 17 June 2010

Personal details
- Born: Pieter Herman Omtzigt; 8 January 1974 (age 52) The Hague, Netherlands
- Party: NSC (since 2023)
- Other political affiliations: CDA (until 2021); Independent (2021–2023)
- Spouse: Ayfer Koç (m. 2009)
- Children: 4
- Education: University of Exeter (BA); European University Institute (PhD)

Pieter Herman Omtzigt ([ˈpitər ˈɦɛrmɑn ˈɔmtsɪxt]; born 8 January 1974) is a Dutch former politician who served as a member of the House of Representatives between 2003 and 2025 apart from a short interruption between June and October 2010. He was a member of the Christian Democratic Appeal (CDA), but left in 2021 and continued as an independent. In August 2023, he founded a new party called New Social Contract, its name taken from his 2021 manifesto. Three months later, his party won 20 out of 150 seats in the 2023 Dutch general election. On 18 April 2025, he announced that he would leave politics due to his burnout.

In his political work, Omtzigt focused on matters of taxes and pensions. He rose to prominence for his role in bringing attention to the childcare benefits scandal.

== Early life and education ==
Omtzigt was born in The Hague, Netherlands in 1974, as one of twins. His father Jan Omtzigt (1939–2019) was a civil servant at the Dutch state telecommunications company PTT and later director of a Roman Catholic retirement house in Zenderen. When he was four years old, Omtzigt moved with his parents and brothers from Wassenaar to Borne. He attended the gymnasium school in Hengelo.

From 1992 to 1996, Omtzigt studied at the University of Exeter (Devon, England), where he obtained his BA degree in Economics and Statistics with European Studies. In the meantime, he did a student exchange program at the LUISS University (Rome, Italy) from 1994 to 1995. During his studies, Omtzigt was also a board member of the youth department of the Dutch Christian trade union CNV between 1991 and 1993. He performed his doctoral research at the European University Institute (Florence, Italy), where he obtained a PhD in Economics in 2003, with the dissertation titled Essays in Cointegration Analysis. Omtzigt was a researcher at the University of Insubria (Varese, Italy) from 2000 to 2002. From 2002 he was a post-doctoral researcher at the Quantitative Economics department of the University of Amsterdam.

== Political career ==
=== Christian Democratic Appeal ===
In parliament, Omtzigt currently serves on the Committees on European Affairs, Foreign Affairs, Housing and Kingdom Services, Social Affairs and Employment, Finance and Public Expenditure. From 2017, he served as the parliament's rapporteur on Brexit.

From 2019, Omtzigt, together with Member of Parliament Renske Leijten (SP), stood up for affected parents in the childcare benefits scandal in which more than 20,000 families were wronged when applying for childcare allowance. In the end, civil servants and (former) ministers were heard by the parliamentary questioning committee on Childcare Allowance, which ultimately led to the fall of the third Rutte cabinet in January 2021.

In July 2020, Omtzigt was defeated by Deputy Prime Minister Hugo de Jonge in a vote for the position of leader of the Christian Democratic Appeal. Omtzigt was re-elected in the 2021 general election, winning 342,472 preference votes, more than any other non-party leader. Following the election, Omtzigt took time off, after complaining of exhaustion. Despite his leave, he decided to attend his installation on 31 March 2021.

On 25 March 2021, confidential notes from the government formation were revealed to include, among other things, "position Omtzigt, function elsewhere" (Dutch: "positie Omtzigt, functie elders"). This prompted a heated debate in parliament and an impasse in the government formation. Amid the continuous news, Omtzigt took a formal leave of absence of four months starting on 25 May. He was temporarily replaced as a member of parliament by Henri Bontenbal.

=== New Social Contract ===
On 10 June 2021, a 78-page memo by Omtzigt was leaked, addressed to the CDA's Spies-committee that analysed the results of the parliamentary elections of March 2021. Omtzigt lashed out hard at the CDA, group employees and CDA members of parliament (who were not named), and wrote that he was promised the leadership of the party if Hugo de Jonge would withdraw as party leader. After De Jonge's departure, however, the party leadership was offered to Wopke Hoekstra. According to Omtzigt, that was completely beyond his control. According to Omtzigt, political party members and members of the House of Representatives have described him as a "psychopath, sick man, rabid dog, jerk, disturbed" and "unstable". Some of those claims were added to the memo by Omtzigt in a WhatsApp screenshot. Two days later, Omtzigt announced that he had left the CDA, and that he would continue as an independent member of parliament after his leave of absence. On 15 September 2021, Omtzigt returned to the Dutch House of Representatives as a member of a one-person parliamentary group under the name Member Omtzigt. In an interview with De Twentsche Courant Tubantia a week earlier, Omtzigt had indicated that he ruled out a return to the CDA.

On 20 August 2023, Omtzigt announced his participation in the early Dutch parliamentary elections scheduled for 22 November 2023, with the party New Social Contract (NSC). The party entered the House as the fourth-largest with twenty seats, and Omtzigt expressed his unwillingness to negotiate about forming a governing coalition with the right-wing populist Party for Freedom (PVV), the election winner, as he believed the party did not respect the rule of law. As part of the cabinet formation, Omtzigt entered talks under informateur Ronald Plasterk with the PVV, VVD, and BBB to address those concerns. He finally left open the possibility to enter into an extraparliamentary cabinet, but he stepped out of the negotiations in February 2024, citing disagreements about finances. Omtzigt rejoined talks under a new informateur, and a coalition agreement to form the Schoof cabinet was reached on 16 May 2024. In the House of Representatives, Omtzigt has served as parliamentary leader and as spokesperson for European affairs, general affairs, the Dutch royal house, and labor migration.

In September 2024, he took a step back from politics as he was experiencing symptoms of an occupational burnout, intending to stay away for a few weeks. His responsibilities as parliamentary leader were taken over by Nicolien van Vroonhoven, ahead of the yearly General Political Debate. De Telegraaf had reported weeks before that Omtzigt had cried and screamed during talks between coalition parties and the cabinet. During Omtzigt's absence, Van Vroonhoven negotiated a deal on asylum measures, and she averted a cabinet collapse following the resignation of State Secretary Nora Achahbar due to "polarizing interactions". Omtzigt started a phased return to the House in late November, and he would temporarily share the role of parliamentary leader with Van Vroonhoven. Omtzigt froze and walked out of a December 2024 interview with Rick Nieman after being asked about his reported emotional behavior during formation talks, but returned shortly after to continue. He later clarified on social media that he was still limited in his capacity to handle pressure as part of his recovery.

=== Parliamentary Assembly of the Council of Europe ===
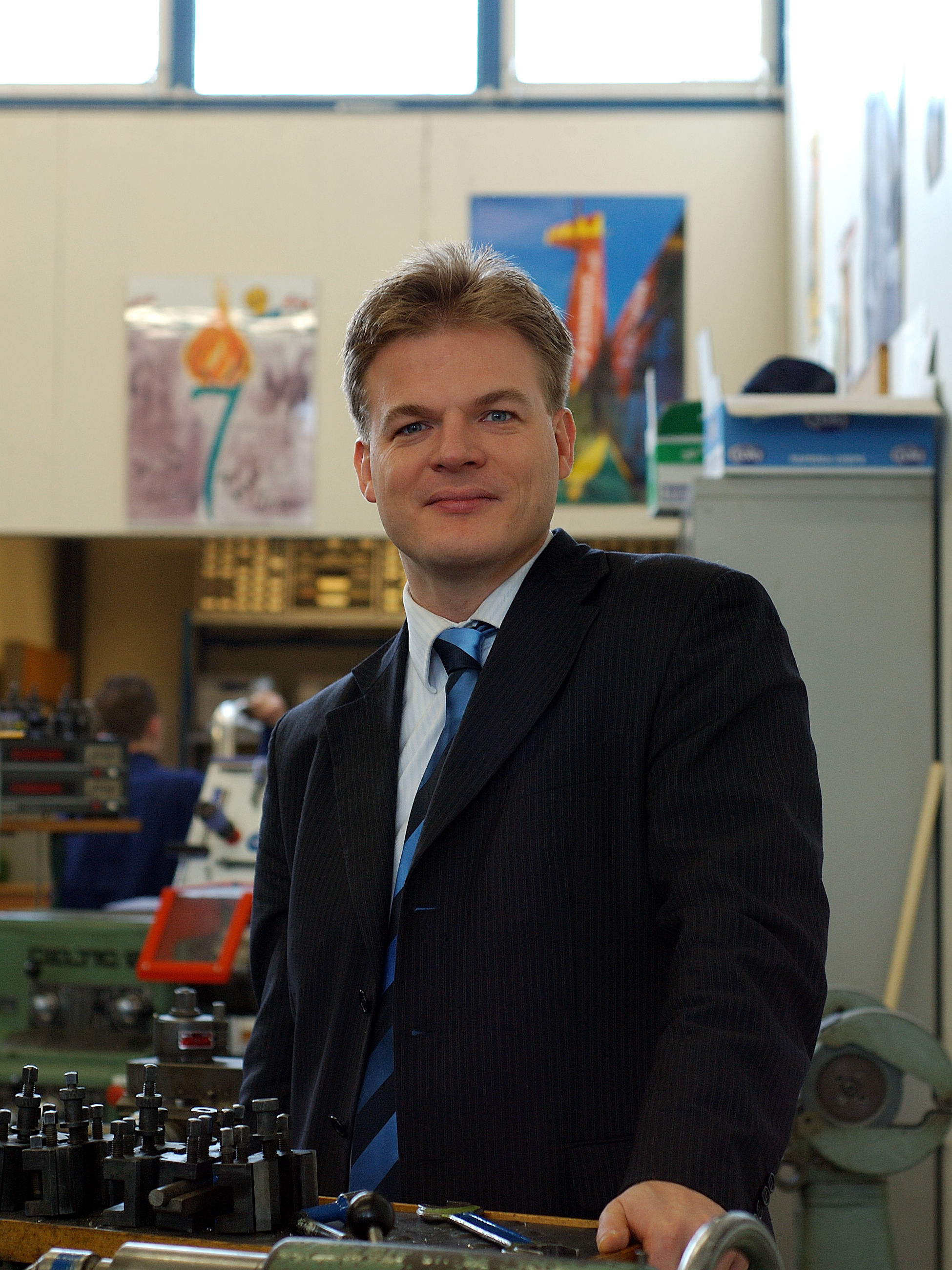
Omtzigt in 2006

In addition to his role in parliament, Omtzigt has been serving as member of the Dutch delegation to the Parliamentary Assembly of the Council of Europe (PACE) since 2004. He is currently a member of the Committee on Legal Affairs and Human Rights; the Committee on the Honouring of Obligations and Commitments by Member States of the Council of Europe (Monitoring Committee); the Sub-Committee on Human Rights; the Sub-Committee on the implementation of judgments of the European Court of Human Rights; and the Sub-Committee on the Rights of Minorities.

In his capacity at the Parliamentary Assembly, Omtzigt has served as the Assembly's rapporteur on mass surveillance since 2014. He has also been the Parliamentary Assembly's General Rapporteur on the protection of whistleblowers since 2021.

Omtzigt has also served as rapporteur on the case of the car bombing of journalist Daphne Caruana Galizia (2018), justice for the victims of ISIL (2019); and on Poland (2019). Between 2016 and 2017, he prepared the Assembly's proposal on an Investment Court System (ICS) for arbitrating in commercial disputes between states and foreign investors.

=== Exit from politics ===
On 18 April 2025, Omtzigt announced his departure from national politics due to ongoing struggles with burnout, saying that he would prioritise his family and health. In a video message posted on X, Omtzigt explained that true recovery from his condition was not possible amid the demanding and chaotic political climate in The Hague. Omtzigt also confirmed that he would be handing over the party leadership to Nicolien van Vroonhoven. At this departure Omtzigt was named Knight in the Order of Orange-Nassau.

== Political positions ==
Omtzigt was long seen as representative of the CDA's Eurosceptic wing. He has been critical of European Central Bank policies and, in 2020, pushed his party to support the idea of the Netherlands opting-out of unwanted EU programs. During the campaign for the 2023 Dutch general election, Omtzigt positioned himself as a centrist: conservative on immigration and climate change but leftist on reducing poverty and improving healthcare. At EW's 2024 HJ Schoo speech, Omtzigt advocated for a social market economy, arguing that the role of the national government should be enlarged. He believed the government should be less constrained by the EU, and he called for a revision of the tax system to favor large corporations less. In the same speech, Omtzigt drew attention to low birth rates in the Netherlands and other European countries. He suggested this might require more labor migration from outside of Europe, and he said that "its geopolitical implications [would be] difficult to underestimate."

In 2024, he called the ministerial responsibility that the Dutch cabinet has for acts by the Dutch royal family problematic. He suggested that either the responsibility should be curtailed or its family members should only perform ceremonial duties. Omtzigt cited the involvement of Princess Laurentien of the Netherlands in the aftermath of the childcare benefits scandal and the work of Queen Máxima of the Netherlands for the Secretary-General of the United Nations.

== Controversy ==
In 2017, media in the Netherlands described how fake news reports of the Malaysia Airlines Flight 17 crash were propagated with the support of Omtzigt, who introduced a Russian man as an "eyewitness" of the crash into a public expert debate in May 2017. The man, who was an asylum-seeker from Ukraine, never witnessed the crash, and his speech, texted to him by Omtzigt prior to the interview, repeated one of the Russia-promoted versions of MiG jets downing the Boeing. Shortly thereafter, journalists determined that the man had not been at home on the night of the crash and he had already been interviewed by officials who had discounted him as a witness. He acknowledged via Twitter that he had acted carelessly and a few days later resigned as the spokesperson for the MH17 file.

== Personal life ==
Omtzigt married Ayfer Koç in 2009 and they have two children. He also has two step-children. He is a Catholic and says he is inspired by Catholic social teaching; he also used to be a friend of Bishop Martinus Patrus Maria Muskens of Breda.

Omtzigt and his family live in Enschede.

== Honours and awards ==
- Knight of the Order of Orange-Nassau (Netherlands, 13 May 2025)
- Medal of Gratitude (Armenia, 25 September 2025)
- Magnitsky Human Rights Awards (17 November 2020)

== Electoral history ==
Electoral history of Pieter Omtzigt
Year	Body	Party	Pos.	Votes	Result		Ref.
Year	Body	Party	Pos.	Votes	Party seats	Individual	Ref.
2003	House of Representatives	Christian Democratic Appeal	51	1,010	44	Lost (Note: Omtzigt was appointed to the body later during the term due to a vacancy.)	
2006	House of Representatives	Christian Democratic Appeal	37	1,934	41	Won	
2010	House of Representatives	Christian Democratic Appeal	29	4,718	21	Lost	
2012	House of Representatives	Christian Democratic Appeal	39	36,750	13	Won (Note: Omtzigt received enough preference votes to be elected despite his party's result.)	
2017	House of Representatives	Christian Democratic Appeal	4	97,638	19	Won	
2021	House of Representatives	Christian Democratic Appeal	2	342,472	15	Won	
2023	House of Representatives	New Social Contract	1	1,203,181	20	Won	

== Publications ==
- Omtzigt, Pieter (23 February 2021). Een nieuw sociaal contract (in Dutch). Prometheus, Uitgeverij. ISBN 978-90-446-4882-9
- Naar een beter bestuur van en voor Nederland
- Essays on Cointegration Analysis
- Omtzigt, Pieter; Tozman, Markus K.; Tyndall, Andrea (2012). The Slow Disappearance of the Syriacs from Turkey and of the Grounds of the Mor Gabriel Monastery. LIT Verlag Münster. ISBN 978-3-643-90268-9
