= Nico Uppelschoten =

Dutch politician (born 1944)

Member of the House of Representatives
- In office 4 July 2024 – 11 November 2025
- Preceded by: Marjolein Faber

Member of the Provincial Council of Drenthe
- In office 2 March 2011 – 4 July 2024

Personal details
- Born: Nico A. Uppelschoten; 21 June 1944 (age 81) Jutphaas, Netherlands
- Party: Party for Freedom
- Occupation: Mathematics teacher; politician

Nico A. Uppelschoten (Dutch: [ˈnikoː ˈʏpəlˌsxoːtə(n)]; born 21 June 1944) is a Dutch politician for the right-wing populist Party for Freedom (PVV).

== Career ==
Uppelschoten worked in the education sector. He has told that he decided to become politically active in his retirement as a result of the dislike of politics and politicians that he developed during his career.

He was the PVV's 39th candidate in the November 2023 general election, when the party won a plurality of 37 seats. Uppelschoten served as the PVV's parliamentary leader in the Provincial Council of Drenthe. When Marjolein Faber vacated her seat in the House of Representatives to become asylum minister in the Schoof cabinet, Uppelschoten was appointed as her successor on 4 July 2024 due to his placement on the party list in the general election. At the age of 80, he became the oldest person to enter the House in Dutch parliamentary history, breaking the record of Jean Adolphe d'Olimart (1740–1820), who had been 75 years old. Uppelschoten served as the PVV's spokesperson for primary, secondary, and vocational education. He was not re-elected in October 2025, and his term ended on 11 November.

=== House committee assignments ===
- Committee for Education, Culture and Science
- Committee for Digital Affairs

== Personal life ==
Uppelschoten has a wife, whom he was caring for as a caregiver because of her dementia as of 2024.

== Electoral history ==
Electoral history of Nico Uppelschoten
Year	Body	Party	Pos.	Votes	Result		Ref.
Year	Body	Party	Pos.	Votes	Party seats	Individual	Ref.
2019	Senate	Party for Freedom	10	0	5	Lost	
2023	House of Representatives	Party for Freedom	39	393	37	Lost (Note: Uppelschoten was appointed to the body later during the term due to a vacancy.)	
2025	House of Representatives	Party for Freedom	42	169	26	Lost	
