= Bart van den Brink =

Dutch politician (born 1978)

His Excellency Bart van den Brink
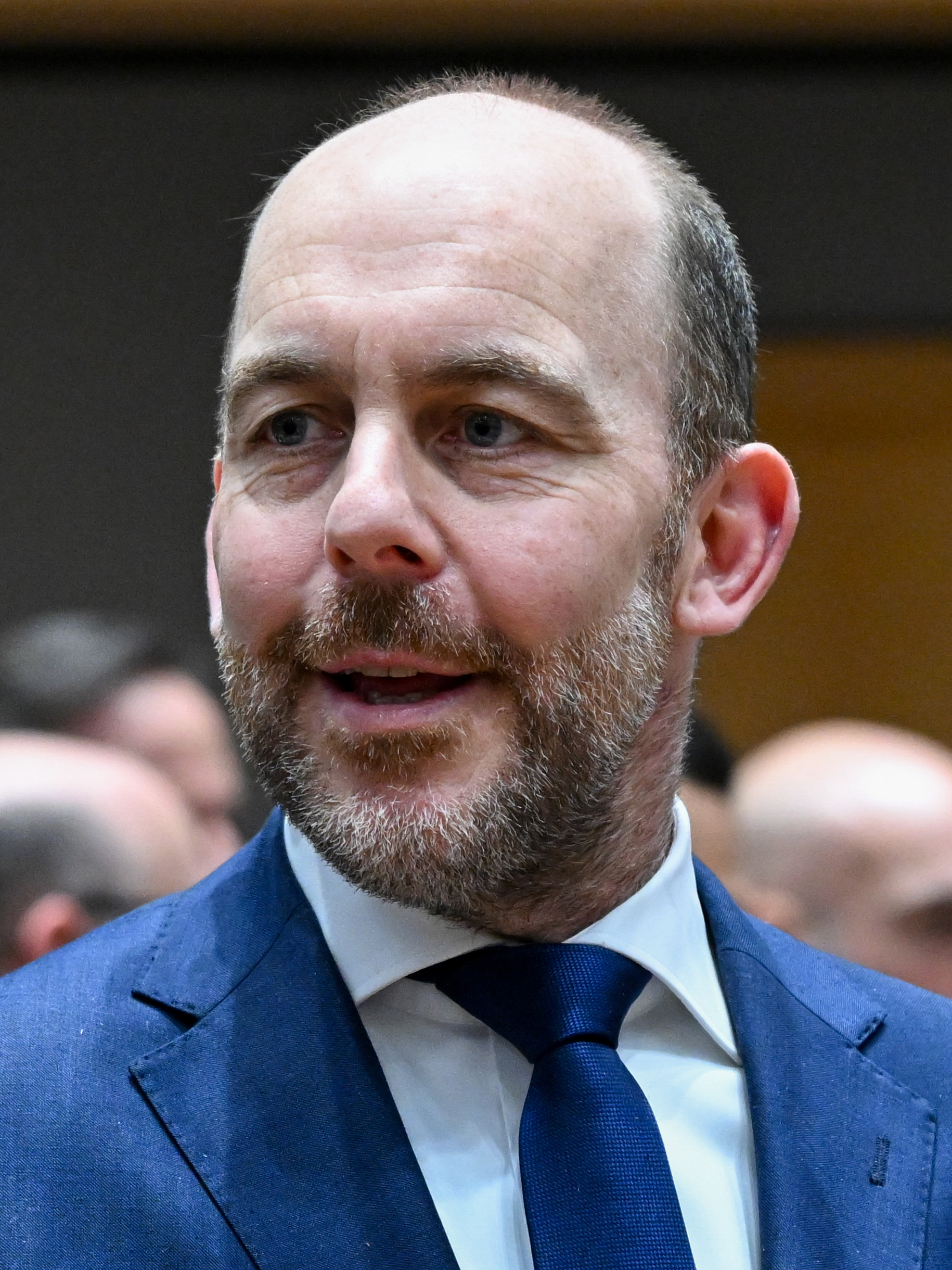
- Van den Brink in 2026

Deputy Prime Minister of the Netherlands
- Incumbent
- Assumed office 23 February 2026 Serving with Dilan Yeşilgöz
- Prime Minister: Rob Jetten

Minister of Asylum and Migration
- Incumbent
- Assumed office 23 February 2026
- Prime Minister: Rob Jetten
- Preceded by: David van Weel

Member of the House of Representatives
- In office 12 November 2025 – 23 February 2026
- In office 10 May 2023 – 6 December 2023

Personal details
- Born: Gijsbertus van den Brink; October 23, 1978 (age 47) Amersfoort, Netherlands
- Party: Christian Democratic Appeal
- Children: 3
- Education: Thorbecke Academy (NHL Stenden)

Gijsbertus "Bart" van den Brink (born 23 October 1978) is a Dutch politician of the Christian Democratic Appeal (CDA). He has served as Deputy Prime Minister of the Netherlands and Minister of Asylum and Migration in the Jetten cabinet since 23 February 2026. He previously served as a member of the House of Representatives in 2023 and again from November 2025 to February 2026.

== Early life and education ==
Van den Brink was born on 23 October 1978 in Amersfoort. He studied public administration at the Thorbecke Academy, part of NHL Stenden University of Applied Sciences, where he obtained a Bachelor of Public Management. He is a member of the Protestant Church in the Netherlands.

== Career ==
=== Early career (2003–2006) ===
After graduating, Van den Brink worked as a civil servant for the municipality of Roermond from 2003 to 2006.

=== Parliamentary staff (2006–2017) ===
In 2006 he moved to The Hague, where he worked as a personal assistant to CDA Member of Parliament Ger Koopmans. From April 2007 he served as a policy adviser on youth and family affairs within the CDA parliamentary group. In April 2008 he became political adviser to State Secretary Marja van Bijsterveldt, responsible for secondary and vocational education, and continued in that role when Van Bijsterveldt was promoted to Minister of Education in October 2010.

From April 2011 Van den Brink served as head of communications, and later as head of communications and policy, for the CDA parliamentary group in the House of Representatives.

=== Adviser to Hugo de Jonge (2017–2022) ===
From October 2017 to January 2022, Van den Brink served as political adviser to Hugo de Jonge, who served as Minister of Health, Welfare and Sport and Deputy Prime Minister in the Third Rutte cabinet. He subsequently served briefly as political adviser to the Minister for Housing and Spatial Planning from January to April 2022.

=== CDA director and Member of Parliament (2022–2026) ===
From April 2022 Van den Brink served as director of strategy and policy for the CDA parliamentary group, and later as director of communications and policy. He served as campaign leader for the CDA in both the 2023 and 2025 general elections.

Following the resignation of CDA MP Agnes Mulder, Van den Brink was appointed as a member of the House of Representatives on 10 May 2023, a position he held until 6 December 2023. He was re-elected to the House of Representatives in the 2025 Dutch general election and took his seat on 12 November 2025.

=== Minister of Asylum and Migration (2026–present) ===
Following the formation of the Jetten cabinet — a minority cabinet of D66, CDA and VVD — Van den Brink was appointed Minister of Asylum and Migration and Deputy Prime Minister on 23 February 2026. He had served as one of the CDA's lead negotiators during the coalition formation talks, alongside CDA parliamentary leader Henri Bontenbal.

As minister, Van den Brink has pursued stricter asylum legislation, including measures to limit residence permits and criminalize illegal stay for those who fail to comply with a deportation order. His legislative proposals — partly drafted by his predecessor Marjolein Faber — were subject to significant debate in the Senate in April 2026.

== Personal life ==
Van den Brink lives in Amersfoort with his wife and three children. He has worked under five CDA party leaders: Jan Peter Balkenende, Sybrand Buma, Hugo de Jonge, Wopke Hoekstra, and Henri Bontenbal.
