= Jurgen Nobel =

Dutch politician (born 1988)

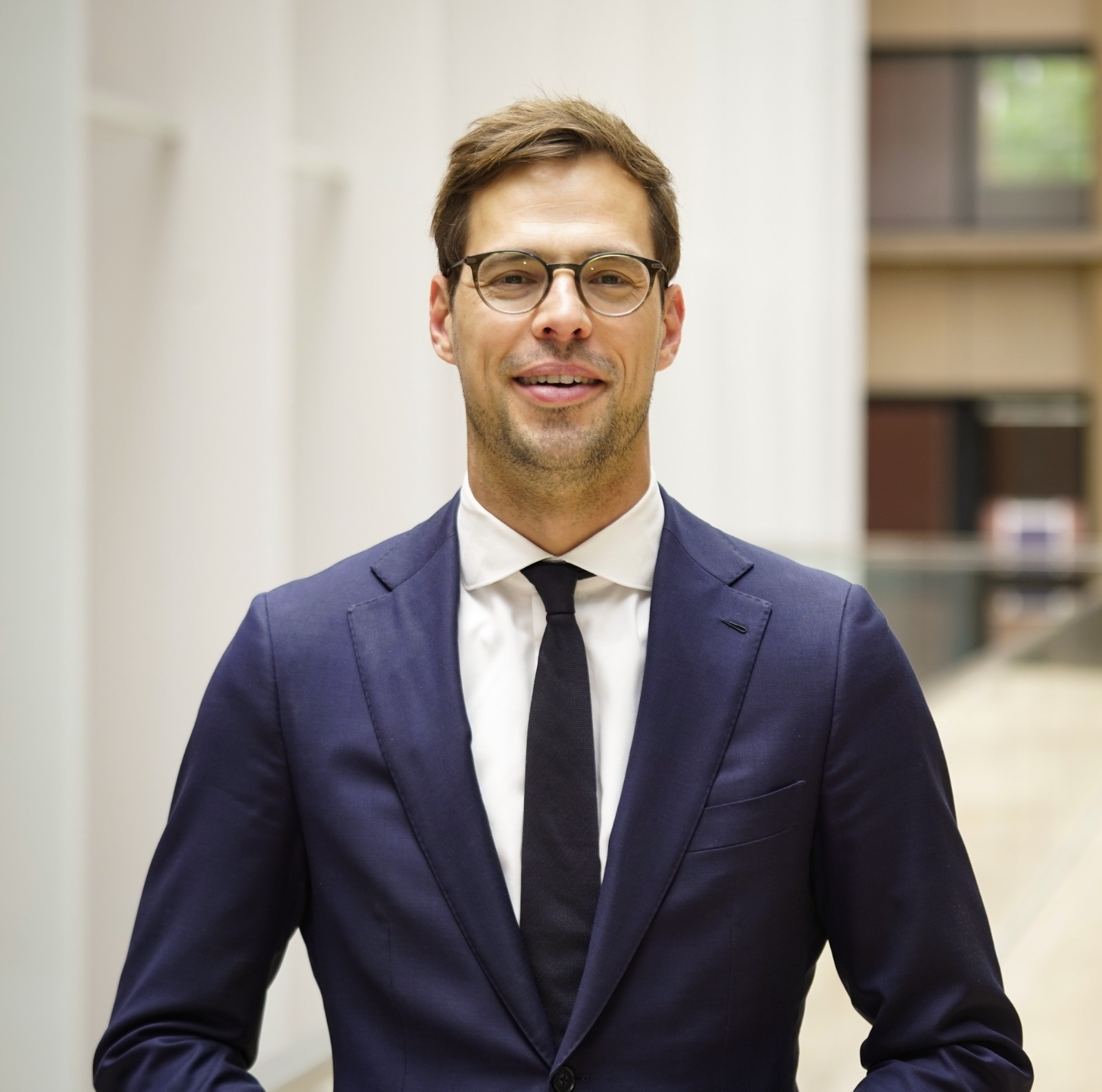
- Nobel in 2025

State Secretary for Participation and Integration
- In office 2 July 2024 – 23 February 2026
- Prime Minister: Dick Schoof
- Minister: Eddy van Hijum; Mariëlle Paul
- Preceded by: Carola Schouten (Note: as Minister for Poverty Policy, Participation and Pensions)

Alderman of Haarlemmermeer
- In office 2019–2024

Municipal councillor of Haarlemmermeer
- In office 2014–2019

Personal details
- Born: Jurgen Norbert Jeroen Nobel; 7 December 1988 (age 37) Haarlem, Netherlands
- Party: People's Party for Freedom and Democracy
- Education: Amsterdam University of Applied Sciences; Vrije Universiteit Amsterdam
- Occupation: Politician

Jurgen Norbert Jeroen Nobel (Dutch: [ˈjʏrɣə ˈnoːbəl]; born 7 December 1988) is a Dutch politician of the People's Party for Freedom and Democracy (VVD). He served as State Secretary for Participation and Integration in the Schoof cabinet from July 2024 until February 2026.

== Early life and career ==
Nobel was born in 1988 in Haarlem, and he grew up in Hoofddorp. His father, Jeroen, was a local Labour Party politician, serving as alderman in Haarlemmermeer and acting mayor of Aalsmeer and Den Helder. Nobel studied business administration at Amsterdam University of Applied Sciences from 2008 to 2012, and he founded Le Bon, a brand of fair trade coffee, the following year. He studied public administration at Vrije Universiteit Amsterdam from 2015 to 2016, and he kept working for his company until 2019.

== Politics ==
Nobel has mentioned being inspired by politician Pim Fortuyn following his assassination in May 2002, and he joined the VVD's independent Youth Organisation Freedom and Democracy (JOVD). He co-founded its Haarlemmermeer region chapter, serving as vice chair in 2011 and 2012. He became a member of the Haarlemmermeer Municipal Council for the VVD in 2014, and he started serving as the party's parliamentary leader in 2017. He was the VVD's lead candidate in two elections, and he served on the municipal audit committee for three years.

In 2019, he was appointed alderman, responsible for finances, housing, and Amsterdam Airport Schiphol, which is located in Haarlemmermeer, and he later served as deputy mayor. In the discussion about noise and environmental pollution, Nobel highlighted the airport's economic benefits, and he argued that reducing flights should not be an end in itself. Besides, he successfully opposed the construction of a new runway in Rijsenhout. Next to his role as alderman, Nobel was chair of the VVD's North Holland chapter between 2022 and 2024.

=== State Secretary for Participation and Integration ===
After the PVV, VVD, NSC, and BBB formed the Schoof cabinet, Nobel was sworn in as State Secretary for Participation and Integration on 2 July 2024. His portfolio includes labor participation, poverty, disability pension, sheltered workshops, reintegration into the labor market, social cohesion, labor conditions, ESF, social affairs in the Caribbean Netherlands, and childcare. He continued efforts by his predecessor to reimburse working parents for 96% of childcare costs starting in 2027. The simplification and expansion of childcare benefits had been triggered by the childcare benefits scandal during the preceding Rutte cabinets.

In response to the November 2024 Amsterdam riots, in which supporters of the Israeli football club Maccabi Tel Aviv F.C. were targeted, Nobel said that the Netherlands had a major integration problem and that a significant portion of Islamic youth did not endorse Dutch norms and values. Prime Minister Dick Schoof held a specific group of young people with a migration background responsible for the attacks. An alliance of mosques filed a criminal complaint against Nobel for group insult, inciting hate, and discrimination in the performance of a duty, arguing that the religious beliefs of the perpetrators were unknown. When State Secretary Nora Achahbar resigned as a result of "polarizing interactions", she cited Nobel's remarks. Nobel later clarified that he did not intend to make generalizations about population groups. Nobel presented an action plan concerning integration in February 2025 that included measures to tackle foreign interference in migrant communities, to decrease their dependency on social welfare, and to reduce practices such as female genital mutilation and forced marriage.

== Notes ==
Political offices
Preceded by Carola Schouten as Minister for Poverty Policy, Participation and Pensions	State Secretary for Participation and Integration; 2024–present	Incumbent
