= Eric van der Burg =

Dutch politician (born 1965)

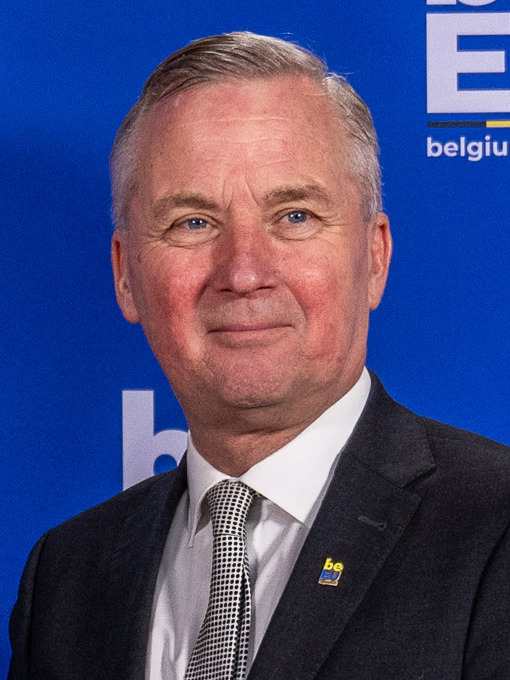
- Van der Burg in 2024

State Secretary for Justice and Security
- In office 10 January 2022 – 2 July 2024
- Prime Minister: Mark Rutte
- Preceded by: Ankie Broekers-Knol
- Succeeded by: Marjolein Faber (as Minister of Asylum and Migration)

Senator of the Netherlands
- In office 11 June 2019 – 10 January 2022

Mayor of Amsterdam
- Ad interim
- In office 26 October 2017 – 4 December 2017
- Preceded by: Kajsa Ollongren (ad interim)
- Succeeded by: Jozias van Aartsen (acting)

Member of the House of Representatives
- In office 6 December 2023 – 23 February 2026

Personal details
- Born: 9 October 1965 (age 61) Amsterdam, Netherlands
- Party: People's Party for Freedom and Democracy (VVD)

Eric van der Burg (born 9 October 1965) is a Dutch politician, who served as State Secretary for Justice and Security in the fourth Rutte cabinet between January 2022 and July 2024. A member of the People's Party for Freedom and Democracy (VVD), he was elected to the Senate in 2019. Van der Burg previously had a lengthy political career in the municipality of Amsterdam which culminated in his brief service as ad interim Mayor of Amsterdam in 2017.

== Early life and education ==
Van der Burg was born in Amsterdam, North Holland, but spent his childhood in Friesland. He later moved back to Amsterdam, where he currently resides. Van der Burg attended the secondary school Augustinus College, where he completed the VWO programme. After graduating, he studied law at the Free University of Amsterdam from 1984 to 1991, but did not obtain a degree.

== Early career ==
Van der Burg began his political career in 1987, when he served as a district councillor in the Amsterdam district of Zuidoost. In 2001, Van der Burg became a member of the municipal council of Amsterdam, and remained in that role until 2010.

From 2014 to 2019, Van der Burg served two terms as an alderman. His portfolio included health, sport, spatial planning, airports and the district Zuidoost. In 2017, Van der Burg replaced Kajsa Ollongren as acting Mayor of Amsterdam for three months.

== National politics ==
=== Senate ===
In June 2019, Van der Burg was elected into the Senate of the States General of the Netherlands. While a member of the Senate, Van der Burg has served on several different committees. From December 2020 to February 2021, van der Berg served as the vice-chairman of the temporary Research Proposal Committee for a parliamentary inquiry into discrimination in the Netherlands. The committee's proposal for an inquiry was accepted, and Van der Burg subsequently served as vice-chairman of the Parliamentary Inquiry Committee on Discrimination in the Netherlands.

=== State Secretary for Justice and Security ===
On 10 January 2022, Van der Burg joined the fourth Rutte cabinet as State Secretary for Justice and Security. While on foreign business, he is allowed to use the title "Minister for Migration".

During Van der Burg’s time in office, the Council of Europe’s Commissioner for Human Rights Dunja Mijatović warned the Netherlands in 2022 that it is failing to uphold the most basic rights for asylum seekers arriving in the country. When the Christian Union opposed his party’s proposal to create a two-tier system for asylum seekers, with people under threat of persecution granted more rights than those fleeing war zones, and to cap the number of family members who could join refugees in the second category at 200 per year, Van der Burg reportedly proposed a compromise by making the family reunification rule an “emergency brake” which would only be triggered if the country’s migration facilities were at risk of becoming overcrowded. Shortly after, the coalition government was dissolved.

While the cabinet was demissionary, both houses of parliament passed Van der Burg's Dispersal Act. The law was intended to more fairly distribute asylum seekers across Dutch municipalities. Van der Burg's term ended on 2 July 2024, when the Schoof cabinet was sworn in. He was succeeded by Marjolein Faber as Minister of Asylum and Migration, with her own department.

=== House of Representatives ===
He was elected to the House of Representatives in the November 2023 general election that had resulted from the coalition's collapse. The VVD entered a new coalition with the Party for Freedom (PVV), New Social Contract (NSC), and the Farmer–Citizen Movement (BBB). Van der Burg supported the coalition agreement even though it included the reversal of the Dispersal Act. In an interview, he told that he would not join the new cabinet because of his opposition to the cooperation. In the House, Van der Burg served as the VVD's spokesperson on foreign affairs and Malaysia Airlines Flight 17. During the Gaza war, he said that the Netherlands should unconditionally support Israel, including through the supply of weapons, while he emphasized that its government must adhere to the law of war. Van der Burg condemned pro-Palestinian protests on Dutch university campuses, saying that they included antisemitic acts and that ethnic violence in other conflicts such as the Second Nagorno-Karabakh War sparked less outrage.

==== House committees ====
- Committee for European Affairs
- Committee for Foreign Trade and Development
- Committee for Foreign Affairs
- Contact group United States
- Committee for Defence
- Delegation to the OSCE Parliamentary Assembly

=== State Secretary of Kingdom Relations and Effective Government ===
On 23 February 2026, Van der Burg was appointed to the Jetten cabinet as State Secretary of Kingdom Relations and Effective Government, on the English government website, he is called "Minister for", insted of "State Secretary of".

== Electoral history ==
Electoral history of Eric van de Burg
Year	Body	Party	Pos.	Votes	Result		Ref.
Year	Body	Party	Pos.	Votes	Party seats	Individual	Ref.
2023	House of Representatives	People's Party for Freedom and Democracy	4	21,763	24 / 150	Won	
2025	House of Representatives	People's Party for Freedom and Democracy	5	22,395	22 / 150	Won	
2026	Amsterdam Municipal Council	People's Party for Freedom and Democracy	48 (Note: Van der Burg participated as a lijstduwer.)	313	6 / 45	Lost	
2026	Amsterdam-Centrum District Committee	People's Party for Freedom and Democracy	8	439	2 / 11	Lost	
