= Caspar Veldkamp =

Dutch diplomat and former politician (born 1964)

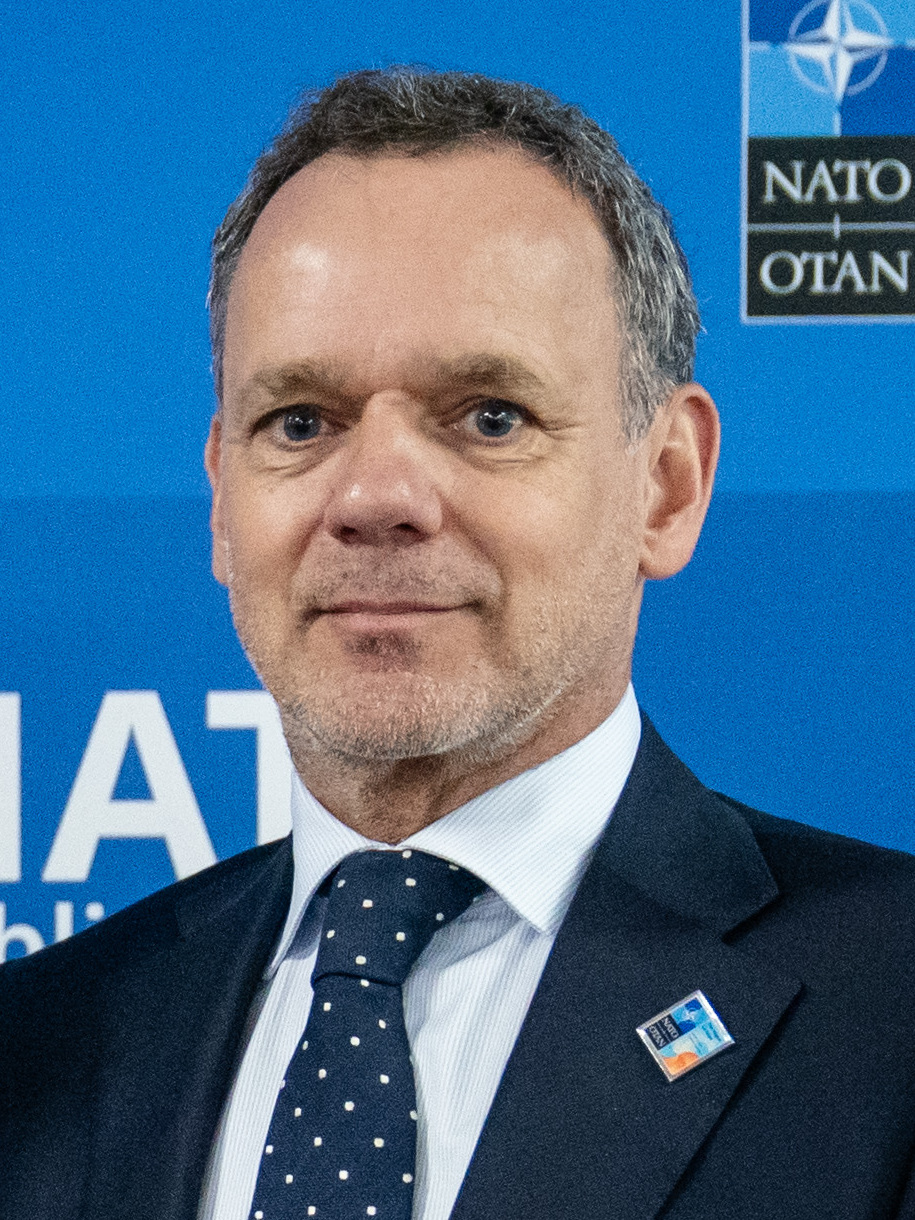
- Veldkamp at the NATO Public Forum, June 2025

European Union Ambassador to China
- Incumbent
- Assumed office Summer 2026

Minister of Foreign Affairs
- In office 2 July 2024 – 22 August 2025
- Prime Minister: Dick Schoof
- Preceded by: Hanke Bruins Slot
- Succeeded by: David van Weel

Member of the House of Representatives
- In office 6 December 2023 – 2 July 2024
- Succeeded by: Annemarie Heite

Ambassador of the Netherlands to Greece
- In office 2015–2019
- Preceded by: Jan Versteeg
- Succeeded by: Stella Ronner-Grubačić

Ambassador of the Netherlands to Israel
- In office 2011–2015
- Preceded by: Michiel den Hond
- Succeeded by: Gilles Beschoor Plug

Personal details
- Born: Caspar Cornelis Johannes Veldkamp; 23 April 1964 (age 62) Etten en Leur, Netherlands
- Party: New Social Contract (2023–present)
- Other political affiliations: Christian Democratic Appeal (formerly)
- Spouse: Anne Veldkamp
- Children: 4
- Education: Erasmus University Rotterdam; Leiden University
- Occupation: Diplomat; politician

Caspar Cornelis Johannes Veldkamp (born 23 April 1964) is a Dutch diplomat and politician. He served as Minister of Foreign Affairs in the Schoof cabinet from 2 July 2024 until 22 August 2025, when he resigned from the caretaker cabinet over its refusal to adopt further measures against Israel over its conduct in Gaza. He is set to become the European Union's Ambassador to China in the summer of 2026, becoming the first Dutch national to hold that position.

A career diplomat, Veldkamp previously served as Ambassador of the Netherlands to Israel (2011–2015) and to Greece (2015–2019), and as a member of the board of directors of the European Bank for Reconstruction and Development (EBRD) in London (2020–2023). He entered politics in 2023 as a member of the House of Representatives for the New Social Contract (NSC) party.

== Early career ==
Veldkamp studied business economics and public administration in the Netherlands and the United States, and completed executive programmes at Harvard University and INSEAD. Prior to joining the foreign service, he worked on the staff of US Senator Richard Lugar on Capitol Hill in Washington, D.C., and served as a reserve officer in the Royal Netherlands Navy.

Veldkamp joined the Ministry of Foreign Affairs as a policy officer in 1993, when the ministry was led by Pieter Kooijmans in the Third Lubbers cabinet. He served at the Dutch Embassy in Warsaw (1995–1997), then as private secretary to the Dutch Minister for European Affairs (1998–2002), and as political counsellor at the Dutch Embassy in Washington, D.C. (2002–2006). He subsequently held senior positions at the ministry in The Hague, focusing on Eastern and Southeastern European affairs, the United Nations and international financial institutions, representing the Netherlands in meetings of the IMF, World Bank and other multilateral development banks.

Veldkamp served as Ambassador to Israel from 2011 to 2015, and as Ambassador to Greece from 2015 to 2019, during both the eurozone crisis and the migration crisis. During his time in Greece, he cooperated closely with Dutch Minister of Finance and Eurogroup President Jeroen Dijsselbloem, and chaired the board of the start-up incubator Orange Grove in Athens. He then served briefly as interim chargé d'affaires at the Dutch Embassy in Brussels (February–September 2020), before being appointed to the EBRD board of directors in London, a position he held until December 2023.

== Entry into politics ==
Veldkamp was a long-time member of the Christian Democratic Appeal (CDA) before joining the newly-founded New Social Contract (NSC) ahead of the 2023 Dutch general election. During the campaign, he described NSC as "an optimistic party for the dissatisfied citizen" and expressed scepticism about what he called the "transfer of powers" to the European Union. He was elected to the House of Representatives on 22 November 2023, placed fourth on the NSC list, receiving 2,386 personal preference votes. He served as the party's spokesperson for foreign affairs and migration.

== Minister of Foreign Affairs ==
After the PVV, VVD, NSC, and BBB formed the Schoof cabinet, Veldkamp was sworn in as Minister of Foreign Affairs on 2 July 2024, succeeding Hanke Bruins Slot. The cabinet reversed the commitment of its predecessor, made following the 2021 Taliban offensive, to allow Afghan guards of the Dutch embassy and Task Force Uruzgan to relocate to the Netherlands.

In his first days as minister, Veldkamp attended the 2024 NATO Summit in Washington, DC, where he met with Israeli foreign minister Israel Katz and announced that the Netherlands would push for the EU to designate Iran's Islamic Revolutionary Guards Corps as a terrorist organisation.

When the International Criminal Court (ICC) issued an arrest warrant for Israeli prime minister Benjamin Netanyahu in November 2024, Veldkamp stated the warrant would be respected if Netanyahu were to visit the Netherlands. A planned visit by Veldkamp to Israel was cancelled the same day after his travel plans, kept secret for security reasons, were leaked.

In December 2024, Veldkamp argued that the Netherlands should support Ukraine as much as possible, including through military aid, and declared that the NATO two-percent defence spending norm was insufficient. He argued that European security concerns should not overshadow developments elsewhere, predicting that conflicts in Asia would come to dominate the century. Following the 2025 Trump–Zelenskyy Oval Office meeting on 28 February 2025, Veldkamp declared that Europe had entered a "new era", remarking: "We have all become Gaullists".

In April 2025, Veldkamp visited Ukraine, laying flowers at the Lychakiv Military Cemetery in Lviv in tribute to fallen Ukrainian servicemen.

In May 2025, Veldkamp visited Beijing for talks with Chinese Foreign Minister Wang Yi (21–22 May), becoming one of the few Western foreign ministers to do so at a time of heightened geopolitical tensions.

=== The Caspar proposal ===
Responding to the March 2025 Israeli attacks on the Gaza Strip, Veldkamp called on all parties to "respect the terms of the Gaza ceasefire and hostage deal." In May 2025, he put forward a proposal for the EU to formally investigate whether Israel's conduct in Gaza — including its blockade — constituted a violation of the EU–Israel Association Agreement (EMA), which obliges both parties to uphold human rights and international law. The initiative, which became known within EU institutions as "the Caspar proposal", secured an unexpectedly large majority among EU member states, compelling the European Commission to open a formal inquiry.

=== NATO Summit in The Hague ===
As caretaker Minister of Foreign Affairs — the Schoof cabinet had become a caretaker government following the withdrawal of PVV in June 2025 — Veldkamp played a central role in hosting the 2025 NATO Summit in The Hague on 24–25 June 2025, the first NATO summit ever held in the Netherlands. The summit focused on a new defence investment framework calling on member states to spend five percent of GDP on defence by 2035.

=== Resignation ===
On 22 August 2025, Veldkamp resigned from the caretaker cabinet after concluding he could no longer secure further meaningful measures against Israel over its actions in Gaza and its settlement plans in the occupied West Bank. All other NSC ministers and state secretaries followed within the hour. Two days later, Hamas publicly praised Veldkamp's decision as "courageous and moral".

== EU Ambassador to China ==
On 23 April 2026, Veldkamp confirmed to the ANP news agency that he will become the European Union's Ambassador to China, taking up the post in Beijing in the summer of 2026. He is the first Dutch national to be appointed to the position; his predecessors as EU Ambassador to China were nationals of Germany, France and Spain respectively.

== Electoral history ==
Electoral history of Caspar Veldkamp
| Year | Body | Party | Pos. | Votes | Result | | Ref. |
| Year | Body | Party | Pos. | Votes | Party seats | Individual | Ref. |
|---|---|---|---|---|---|---|---|
| 2023 | House of Representatives | New Social Contract | 4 | 2,386 | 20 | Won | |

Political offices
| Preceded by Hanke Bruins Slot | Minister of Foreign Affairs; 2024–2025 | Succeeded by David van Weel |
