= National Coordinator for Counterterrorism and Security =

Main Dutch counter-terrorism unit

- Nationaal Coördinator Terrorismebestrijding en Veiligheid

Agency overview
- Formed: 2012
- Jurisdiction: Government of the Netherlands
- Headquarters: Turfmarkt 147, The Hague
- Motto: De NCTV dient de nationale veligheid. Wij beschermen belangen, signaleren dreigingen en versterken weerbaarheid (The NCTV serves the Netherlands’ national security. We protect national interests, identify threats and strengthen resilience.)
- Employees: Classified information
- Minister responsible: David van Weel, Minister of Justice and Security
- Agency executives: Pieter-Jaap Aalbersberg, National Coordinator for Counterterrorism and Security; Wieke Vink, Deputy National Coordinator for Counterterrorism and Security
- Parent department: Ministry of Justice and Security
- Website: nctv.nl

The National Coordinator for Counterterrorism and Security (Dutch Nationaal Coördinator Terrorismebestrijding en Veiligheid), abbreviated as NCTV, is the principal Dutch counterterrorism agency. It was established in January 2005 as the Nationaal Coördinator Terrorismebestrijding (NCTb). The unit was enlarged and renamed in October 2012.

The NCTV is under the responsibility of the Minister of Justice and Security, David van Weel, who succeeded Dilan Yeşilgöz in 2024. In charge of civil aviation and cybersecurity safety, it also analyses terrorism threats to determine the threat level (minimal, limited, substantial, or critical) in the Netherlands. The unit works closely with the General Intelligence and Security Service (AIVD) and Military Intelligence and Security Service (MIVD).

== History ==
The agency was involved in the investigation of Northwest Airlines Flight 253, which was an attempted in-flight bomb attack that occurred on 25 December 2009 and originated at Lagos Airport.

== Heads ==
The head of the NCTV is appointed by the Minister of the Interior and Kingdom Relations after the approval of the Council of Ministers, as every senior civil servant is in the Netherlands. The following people have served as the National Coordinator for Security and Counterterrorism:

- Tjibbe Joustra (27 April 2004 – 1 January 2009)
- Erik Akerboom| (1 April 2009 – 1 December 2012)
- Dick Schoof (1 March 2013 – 19 November 2018)
- Pieter-Jaap Aalbersberg (since 1 February 2019)
