= Schoof cabinet asylum measures =

When the Schoof cabinet was formed in 2024, it agreed to declare an asylum crisis in the Netherlands. An agreement was struck between coalition parties in October 2024 to implement several asylum measures through the legislative process.

== Background ==
Annual asylum statistics
Year	First-time asylum applications and family reunifications
2013	13,470
2014	27,165
2015	56,940
2016	31,185
2017	30,635
2018	26,975
2019	26,720
2020	17,585
2021	34,860
2022	46,460
2023	48,500
2024	44,055

In 2023 – the year before the Schoof cabinet was sworn in – around 330,000 migrants entered the Netherlands, including 38,000 first-time asylum applicants and family reunification migrants. Refugees from Ukraine, fleeing the Russian invasion, did not have to apply for asylum and totaled 110,000. The Bureau for Economic Policy Analysis concluded that asylum migration did not show a clear trend and was volatile; yearly totals have depended on particular conflicts. The number of first-time asylum applications in the first half of 2024 exceeded those from the same period the previous year, but fell below the previous year's levels in the third quarter.

== Proposed asylum crisis ==
The coalition agreement of the right-wing Schoof cabinet, struck by the PVV, VVD, NSC, and BBB in May 2024, included plans to issue a "well-substantiated" statutory instrument to suspend certain provisions of the Aliens Act and to introduce an Asylum Crisis Act without delay. It was agreed that decisions on asylum applications would be suspended, that the Dispersal Act would be revoked, and that a two-tier asylum system which was used prior to 2000 would return. Under this system, refugees fleeing personal persecution would be granted an A status, while those fleeing war or violence would receive a B status, who are subject to stricter conditions and rules for family reunification. The coalition parties called their migration policy the most stringent and extensive in history.

In response to questions by MEP Sophie in 't Veld, European Commissioner for Home Affairs Ylva Johansson wrote that a reasoned request would have to be submitted in order to proclaim an asylum crisis, showing that the system has become non-functional despite preparations. In late August 2024, Minister of Asylum and Migration Marjolein Faber said that the Netherlands was experiencing an asylum crisis when discussing the closure of an application center for Ukrainian refugees due to overcrowding. She clarified that her comments did not constitute an official declaration of an asylum crisis and that a bill would be finalized around Prinsjesdag, in mid-September. Prime Minister Dick Schoof remarked that more time would be required.

The governing agreement of the Schoof cabinet, presented on 13 September, reiterated that an asylum crisis would be declared by royal decree, bypassing initial parliamentary approval. Schoof stated that citizens were experiencing an asylum crisis but admitted he was unable to specify conditions or a timeline for its resolution. Opposition parties questioned the legal viability of invoking emergency powers, and they criticized the lack of parliamentary consultation. Nicolien van Vroonhoven (NSC) noted that her party's support was contingent on a positive advice of the Council of State. Her party joined the opposition in demanding the release of official documents related to the planned use of emergency measures during the annual General Political Debate following Prinsjesdag, referring to the parliament's right to information under Article 68 of the Constitution of the Netherlands. Documents of the Ministry of the Interior and Kingdom Relations showed that civil servants had advised against using emergency legislation, contending that the situation was unlikely to meet the threshold for exceptional circumstances. Faber insisted that she believed a crisis could still be declared. The VVD and NSC later called on the cabinet to prepare an expedited law in parallel, while Geert Wilders stressed that the cabinet would be in trouble if no emergency law would be enacted.

Opposition parties held a majority in the Senate, which would have to approve continuation of an emergency. On 9 October 2024, during the Senate's General Political Debate, a motion was carried declaring the use of emergency powers undesirable and urging the cabinet to propose an alternative approach. A report by the Netherlands Bar concluded the following day that "the government could not claim to have a fully-fledged rule of law" if it were to abuse emergency powers.

== Asylum bills ==
=== October 2024 agreement ===
Schoof facilitated negotiations between the coalition parties in October 2024 to resolve their disagreements, initially inviting only the PVV and NSC. The coalition came to an agreement on 25 October, and it was adopted by the cabinet the same day. The proposed use of emergency powers was abandoned, and a bill called the Asylum Emergency Measures Act would be introduced to enact asylum measures, most of which were outlined in the coalition agreement, along with some additional provisions.

The bill was intended to tighten the asylum application procedure through eliminating permanent residence permits, reducing the validity of five-year permits to three years, making adult children and unmarried partners ineligible for family reunification, broadening the possibilities for pronouncing convicts undesirable, and abolishing judicial penalties for the Immigration and Naturalisation Service (IND) in case procedures exceed the statutory time limit. Besides, the cabinet planned to declare certain regions of Syria, responsible for the largest number of asylum seekers due to its civil war, safe. The Netherlands would reduce its commitment to take on UNHCR refugees for resettlement from 500 to 200. Furthermore, the Dispersal Act would be repealed, and border checks would start in late November with other countries of the Schengen Area. 50 to 100 additional prison cells would be allocated to hold rejected asylum seekers, and municipalities would no longer be required to house refugees whose asylum has been granted. Instead, basic housing provisions would be established.

Parliamentary responses by Faber revealed the existence of a draft note on the proposed asylum crisis by the state advocate, despite earlier statements by Schoof and Faber that no documents existed. Laurens Dassen (Volt) called for the draft note's release, and the House of Representatives adopted the request in November 2024 with NSC's support. The cabinet refused to comply.

=== Implementation ===
The cabinet invoked an article of the Schengen Agreement to ramp up border checks for human trafficking and illegal migration for the duration of six months, starting on 9 December 2024, citing a high influx of asylum seekers. In a letter to Faber, 46 border municipalities expressed their concerns about the measure's effect on commutes. On the same day, the cabinet suspended decisions on asylum applications by Syrians for six months, following the fall of the Assad regime.

After Faber finished the Asylum Emergency Measures Act and the bill establishing a two-tier asylum system, they entered a shortened consultation period. In their review, the Council of State's Administrative Jurisdiction Division, the Council for the Judiciary, and the Netherlands Bar warned that both proposals would lead to increased workload for the judiciary and the Immigration and Naturalisation Service. They also criticized the limited time to assess the bills. The two bills were approved by the cabinet on 20 December 2024, along with the Return and Detention of Aliens Act. The latter had first been introduced by the second Rutte cabinet, and it criminalizes the refusal to cooperate with deportation procedures. Contrary to the October 2024 agreement, the final version of the Asylum Emergency Measures Act included a provision allowing permanent residence permits to be obtained after five years. Besides, Faber clarified in an explanatory note to the bill that adult children and unmarried partners of asylum seekers, excluded from family reunifications, could still enter the Netherlands under a provision of the European Convention on Human Rights.

In early February 2025, the Council of State recommended against proceeding with the Asylum Emergency Measures Act and the bill establishing a two-tier asylum system. It concluded that the bills had been improperly prepared and that the cabinet had not substantiated its claim that the measures would reduce the inflow of asylum seekers or increase the efficiency of the asylum procedure. On the latter, the Council of State wrote that the bills would likely place a greater burden on the IND and the judiciary.
