= Ministry of Asylum and Migration =

Government ministry of the Netherlands

- Ministerie van Asiel en Migratie
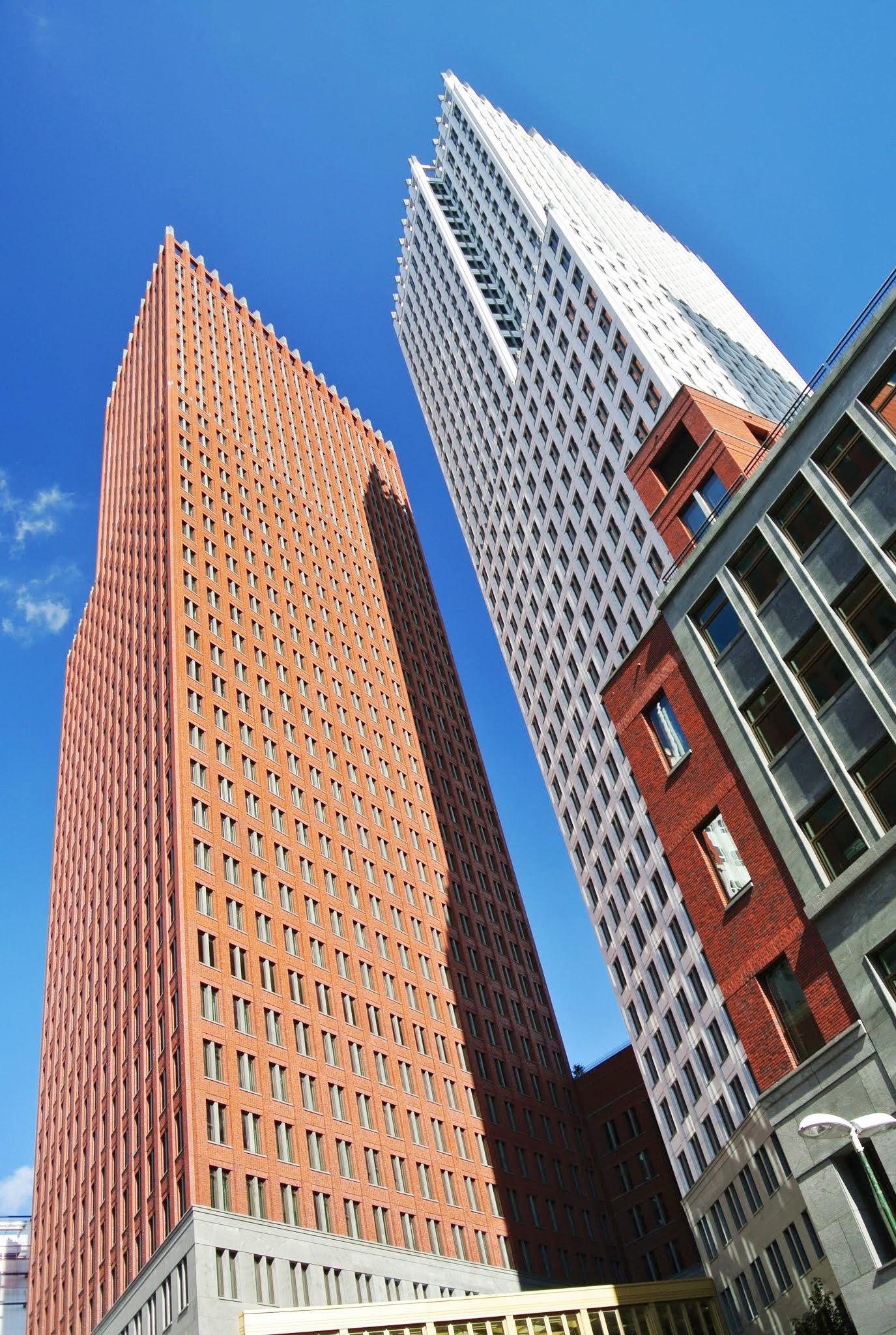
- Current head office

Department overview
- Formed: 2 July 2024; 2 years ago
- Jurisdiction: Kingdom of the Netherlands
- Headquarters: Turfmarkt 147, The Hague, Netherlands
- Minister responsible: David van Weel, Minister of Asylum and Migration
- Website: Ministry of Asylum and Migration

The Ministry of Asylum and Migration (Dutch: Ministerie van Asiel en Migratie; AenM) is the Dutch government ministry responsible for matters relating to asylum and migration.

The ministry was established on 2 July 2024 following the formation of the Schoof cabinet. It was created through the separation of responsibilities from the Ministry of Justice and Security, reflecting the priorities of the incoming governing coalition led by the Party for Freedom (PVV), which had won the 2023 Dutch general election and pledged to pursue what it described as the most restrictive asylum policy in Dutch history.

Although newly formed, the ministry shares its offices with the Ministry of Justice and Security due to government-wide austerity measures and civil service budget cuts outlined in the coalition agreement. Its remit largely mirrors that of the former State Secretary for Asylum and Migration.

The first minister to lead the ministry was Marjolein Faber of the PVV, who served from its inception until 3 June 2025. She stepped down after the PVV withdrew support for the caretaker cabinet. She was succeeded in an acting capacity by David van Weel, who simultaneously serves as Minister of Justice and Security. During the caretaker period, certain policy areas under the ministry’s portfolio were temporarily reassigned to the Ministry of Housing and Spatial Planning and the Ministry of Social Affairs and Employment.

== See also ==
- List of ministers of migration of the Netherlands
