= Foort van Oosten =

Dutch politician and lawyer (born 1977)

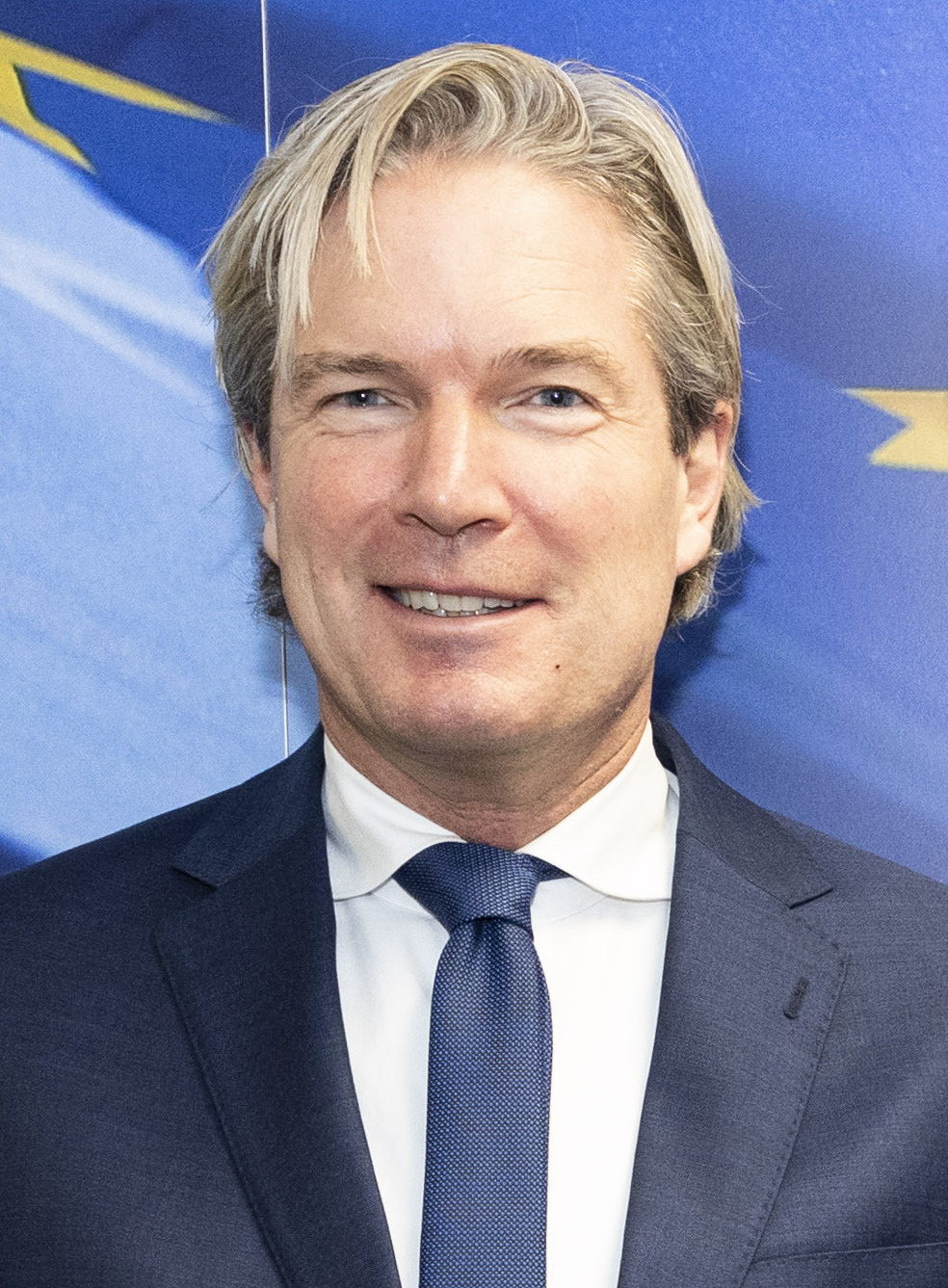
- Van Oosten in 2025

Minister of Justice and Security
- In office 5 September 2025 – 23 February 2026
- Cabinet: Schoof
- Preceded by: David van Weel
- Succeeded by: David van Weel

Mayor of Nissewaard
- In office 20 February 2019 – 5 September 2025
- Preceded by: Mirjam Salet
- Succeeded by: Cor Lamers (acting)

Member of the House of Representatives
- In office 20 September 2012 – 20 February 2019

Personal details
- Born: 25 June 1977 (age 49) Dordrecht, Netherlands
- Party: People's Party for Freedom and Democracy
- Occupation: Lawyer; politician

Foort van Oosten (born 25 June 1977) is a Dutch lawyer and politician of the conservative-liberal People's Party for Freedom and Democracy (VVD). He is currently interim mayor of Leeuwarden. He previously served as Minister of Justice and Security in the Schoof cabinet between September 2025 and February 2026.

== Early life and career ==
Van Oosten was born in 1977 in Dordrecht, and studied law at Leiden University. He was a member of the municipal council of Schiedam from 2010 to 2011, and subsequently an alderman of this municipality from 2011 to 2012. He was a member of the House of Representatives between 20 September 2012 and 20 February 2019.

On 20 February 2019 he was appointed as mayor of Nissewaard. In February 2020, he lobbied for a national knife ban following a spate of stabbings involving teenagers. In September 2020, Nissewaard councilor Peter van der Velden filed a complaint against the municipality and mayor Foort van Oosten for raiding his home in Spijkenisse without permission. Officials of the civil affairs department, at the behest of Van Oosten, started an investigation on suspicions that Van der Velder did not live within the municipality and therefore may not be a councilor there.

Van Oosten joined the demissionary Schoof cabinet on 5 September 2025 as minister of justice and security, succeeding David van Weel in a cabinet reshuffle.

As of July 2026, he is interim mayor of Leeuwarden.

== Personal life ==
He is married, and has a son.

Political offices
Preceded by David van Weel	Minister of Justice and Security; 2025–2026	Succeeded by David van Weel
