= Dispersal Act =

Dutch immigration statute passed in 2024

States General of the Netherlands
- Long title: Asylum Reception Facilities in Municipalities (Enablement) Act
- Passed by: House of Representatives
- Passed: 10 October 2023
- Passed by: Senate
- Passed: 23 January 2024
- Royal assent: 24 January 2024

First chamber: House of Representatives
- Introduced by: Eric van der Burg
- Voting summary: 81 voted for; 68 voted against

Second chamber: Senate
- Committee responsible: Committee for Immigration & Asylum / Justice and Home Affairs Council
- Voting summary: 43 voted for; 27 voted against
- Status: In force

The Dispersal Act (Dutch: Spreidingswet), formally known as the Asylum Reception Facilities in Municipalities (Enablement) Act (Dutch: Wet gemeentelijke taak mogelijk maken asielopvangvoorzieningen), is a Dutch statute intended to better distribute asylum seekers across municipalities. Introduced by Minister for Migration Eric van der Burg, it was passed by the House of Representatives in October 2023 and by the Senate in January 2024.

== Contents ==
The bill has made municipalities co-responsible for sheltering asylum seekers. To ensure a fair distribution, the cabinet member in charge of immigration should once per two years assess per province the accommodation necessary to house all refugees. The King's commissioner facilitates negotiations within a province between municipalities to determine a distribution of the required capacity. Municipalities receive financial incentives for sheltering special groups of asylum seekers and for providing more accommodation than required. The baseline for the latter is determined by a combination of the municipality's population and socio-economic score. The bonus for additional sheltering is intended to prevent downscaling of capacity in times of a low influx of refugees. If no agreement is reached within nine months, the national government can compel municipalities to take on a specified number of asylum seekers.

In the Nederlands Juristenblad, several jurists questioned the government's ability to force the sheltering of additional refugees. Besides, Van der Burg clarified to the Senate that agreements would not be enforced if municipalities unable to fulfill their obligations indicated their challenge in a timely manner.

== Legislative history ==
Minister for Migration Eric van der Burg (VVD) announced the Dispersal Act in the summer of 2022, as too few municipalities were volunteering to shelter refugees. He introduced it in the House of Representatives on 28 March 2023. In order to secure support from the VVD, a coalition party, Van der Burg replaced obligations for municipalities to shelter asylum seekers by financial incentives: upon opening a location housing at least 100 refugees for at least five years, they would receive €2,500 per refugee. However, the revised bill did not receive enough support, and the fourth Rutte cabinet collapsed in July 2023 as a result of disagreements over immigration reform. The CDA, a coalition party until the collapse, successfully attempted to remove most financial incentives from the bill in late September. The Dispersal Act was passed by the House of Representatives on 10 October with 81 out of 149 votes in favor. The VVD voted in opposition, arguing measures would first have to be taken to reduce the number of refugees entering the Netherlands.

The bill subsequently moved to the Senate, where it was set to be voted on in January 2024. Following the November 2023 general election, a House motion by VVD leader Dilan Yeşilgöz was carried calling on the Senate to suspend its consideration of the bill in order to not interfere with the ongoing cabinet formation. The motion was co-sponsored by the other parties involved in the process (PVV, BBB, and NSC), while being fiercely criticized by the opposition. The VVD's ten-member parliamentary group in the Senate announced a week before the vote it would support the bill, saying it trusted the newly elected House of Representatives would tackle inflow issues. The bill was approved on 23 January with 43 out of the 70 senators present voting in favor, and it went into effect on 1 February.

== Execution and repeal efforts ==
On 17 May 2024, the PVV, VVD, NSC, and BBB presented their coalition agreement, in which they announced their intention to repeal the Dispersal Act. Minister of Asylum and Migration Marjolein Faber (PVV) said in October 2024 that the process would take two to three years, but she retracted her statement the same week, saying that the repeal would be enacted as soon as possible. The coalition parties reached an agreement on asylum measures on 25 October, committing to repeal the law potentially within the year, but Faber later announced that the repeal would be submitted for advice in the first quarter of 2025. All King's commissioners signed a letter in support of the Dispersal Act.

The deadline for provinces to submit their plans to shelter 96,000 asylum seekers in total was 1 November 2024. Five out of twelve provinces – Drenthe, Flevoland, Gelderland, Groningen, and Zeeland – met or exceeded their objective, while a total of 80,000 sheltering spots had been agreed to across all provinces. Ahead of the deadline, RTL Nieuws concluded that 85% of municipalities had made plans to shelter asylum seekers, comparing it to 53% of municipalities that sheltered them in the period 2012–2024. Faber later urged provinces to provide the last 6,000 shelter spots by July 2024.
