= List of ministers of migration of the Netherlands =

Minister of Asylum and Migration of the Netherlands
- Minister van Asiel en Migratie
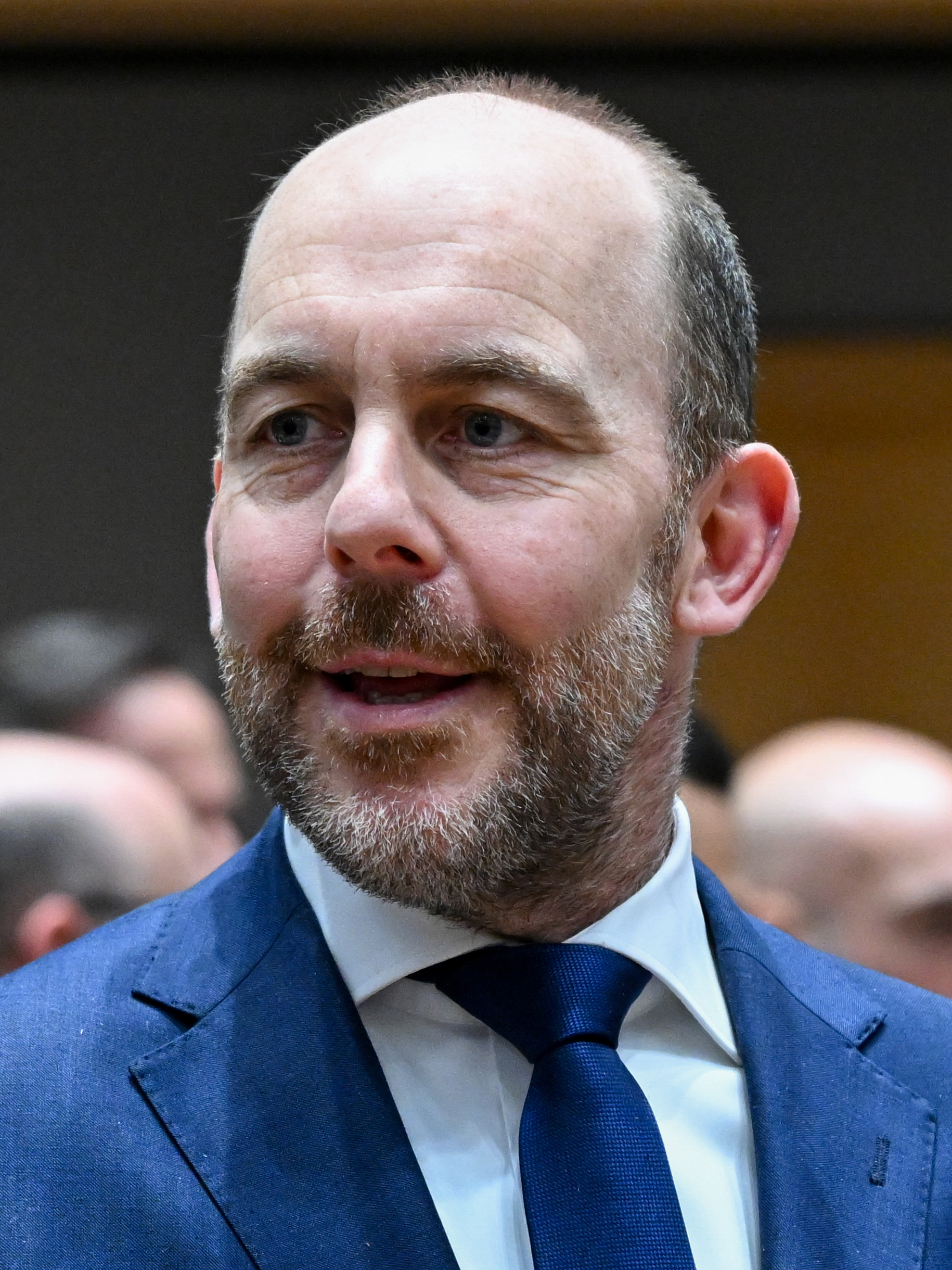
- Incumbent; Bart van den Brink since February 23, 2026
- Ministry of Justice and Security
- Style: His Excellency
- Member of: Council of Ministers
- Appointer: The monarch on advice of the prime minister
- First holder: Hilbrand Nawijn as Minister for Immigration and Integration; 22 July 2002; 24 years ago
- Salary: €205,991 (As of 2025)

The Netherlands has had a dedicated minister responsible for immigration affairs and asylum policy in multiple cabinets. From 2024, the officeholder has held the official title minister of Asylum and Migration (Dutch: minister van Asiel en Migratie). The current minister, Bart van den Brink, has served since 23 February 2026.

== List of ministers of migration ==
Cabinet	Minister			Term of office		Title
Cabinet	Image	Name	Party	Start	End	Title
Balkenende I	Hilbrand Nawijn	Hilbrand Nawijn	LPF	22 July 2002	27 May 2003	Minister for Immigration and Integration (Note: Minister without portfolio within the Ministry of Justice.)
Balkenende II	Rita Verdonk	Rita Verdonk	VVD	27 May 2003	14 December 2006	Minister for Immigration and Integration
Balkenende III	Rita Verdonk	Rita Verdonk	VVD	27 May 2003	14 December 2006	Minister for Immigration and Integration
14 December 2006 – 14 October 2010: No minister of migration
Rutte I	Gerd Leers	Gerd Leers	CDA	14 October 2010	5 November 2012	Minister for Immigration and Asylum (Note: Minister without portfolio within the Ministry of the Interior and Kingdom Relations.)
5 November 2012 – 2 July 2024: No minister of migration
Schoof	Marjolein Faber	Marjolein Faber	PVV	2 July 2024	3 June 2025	Minister of Asylum and Migration
Schoof	David van Weel	David van Weel	VVD	3 June 2025	23 February 2026	Minister of Asylum and Migration
Schoof	Eddy van Hijum	Eddy van Hijum	NSC	19 June 2025	22 August 2025	Minister for Asylum and Migration (Note: Minister without portfolio within the Ministry of Asylum and Migration.)
Schoof	Mona Keijzer	Mona Keijzer	BBB	19 June 2025	23 February 2026	Minister for Asylum and Migration
Jetten	Bart van den Brink	Bart van den Brink	CDA	23 February 2026	Incumbent	Minister of Asylum and Migration (Note: Minister without portfolio within the Ministry of Justice and Security.)

== List of state secretaries for migration ==
Prior to the Schoof cabinet – with the exception of the first, second and third Balkenende cabinets, and the first Rutte cabinet – a state secretary of the Ministry of Justice was responsible for immigration affairs and asylum policy. In later years, this state secretary was allowed to use the title 'minister for migration' in diplomatic contexts.

Cabinet	State secretary			Term of office		Ministry
Cabinet	Image	Name	Party	Start	End	Ministry
De Jong	Klaas Wiersma	Klaas Wiersma	VVD	20 April 1970	6 July 1971	Justice
Biesheuvel I	Hans Grosheide	Hans Grosheide	ARP	28 July 1971	11 May 1973	Justice
Biesheuvel II	Hans Grosheide	Hans Grosheide	ARP	28 July 1971	11 May 1973	Justice
Den Uyl	Jan Glastra van Loon	Jan Glastra van Loon	D66	13 June 1973	27 May 1975	Justice
Den Uyl	Henk Zeevalking	Henk Zeevalking	D66	6 June 1975	8 September 1977	Justice
Van Agt I	Bert Haars	Bert Haars	CHU	28 December 1977	11 September 1981	Justice
Van Agt I	Bert Haars	Bert Haars	CDA	28 December 1977	11 September 1981	Justice
Van Agt II	Michiel Scheltema	Michiel Scheltema	D66	11 September 1981	4 November 1982	Justice
Van Agt III	Michiel Scheltema	Michiel Scheltema	D66	11 September 1981	4 November 1982	Justice
Lubbers I	Virginie Korte-van Hemel	Virginie Korte-van Hemel	CDA	8 November 1982	7 November 1989	Justice
Lubbers II	Virginie Korte-van Hemel	Virginie Korte-van Hemel	CDA	8 November 1982	7 November 1989	Justice
Lubbers III	Aad Kosto	Aad Kosto	PvdA	7 November 1989	27 May 1994	Justice
Kok I	Elizabeth Schmitz	Elizabeth Schmitz	PvdA	22 August 1994	3 August 1998	Justice
Kok II	Job Cohen	Job Cohen	PvdA	3 August 1998	1 January 2001	Justice
Kok II	Ella Kalsbeek	Ella Kalsbeek	PvdA	1 January 2001	22 July 2002	Justice
22 July 2002 – 22 February 2007: No state secretary for migration
Balkenende IV	Nebahat Albayrak	Nebahat Albayrak	PvdA	22 February 2007	23 February 2010	Justice
23 February 2010 – 5 November 2012: No state secretary for migration
Rutte II	Fred Teeven	Fred Teeven	VVD	5 November 2012	10 March 2015	Security and Justice
Rutte II	Klaas Dijkhoff	Klaas Dijkhoff	VVD	20 March 2015	4 October 2017	Security and Justice
Rutte III	Mark Harbers	Mark Harbers	VVD	26 October 2017	21 May 2019	Justice and Security
Rutte III	Ankie Broekers-Knol	Ankie Broekers-Knol	VVD	11 July 2019	10 January 2022	Justice and Security
Rutte IV	Eric van der Burg	Eric van der Burg	VVD	10 January 2022	2 July 2024	Justice and Security

== See also ==
- List of ministers of justice of the Netherlands
- Ministry of Asylum and Migration
