= Schoof cabinet =

Cabinet of the Netherlands, 2024 to 2026

- Cabinet of the Netherlands

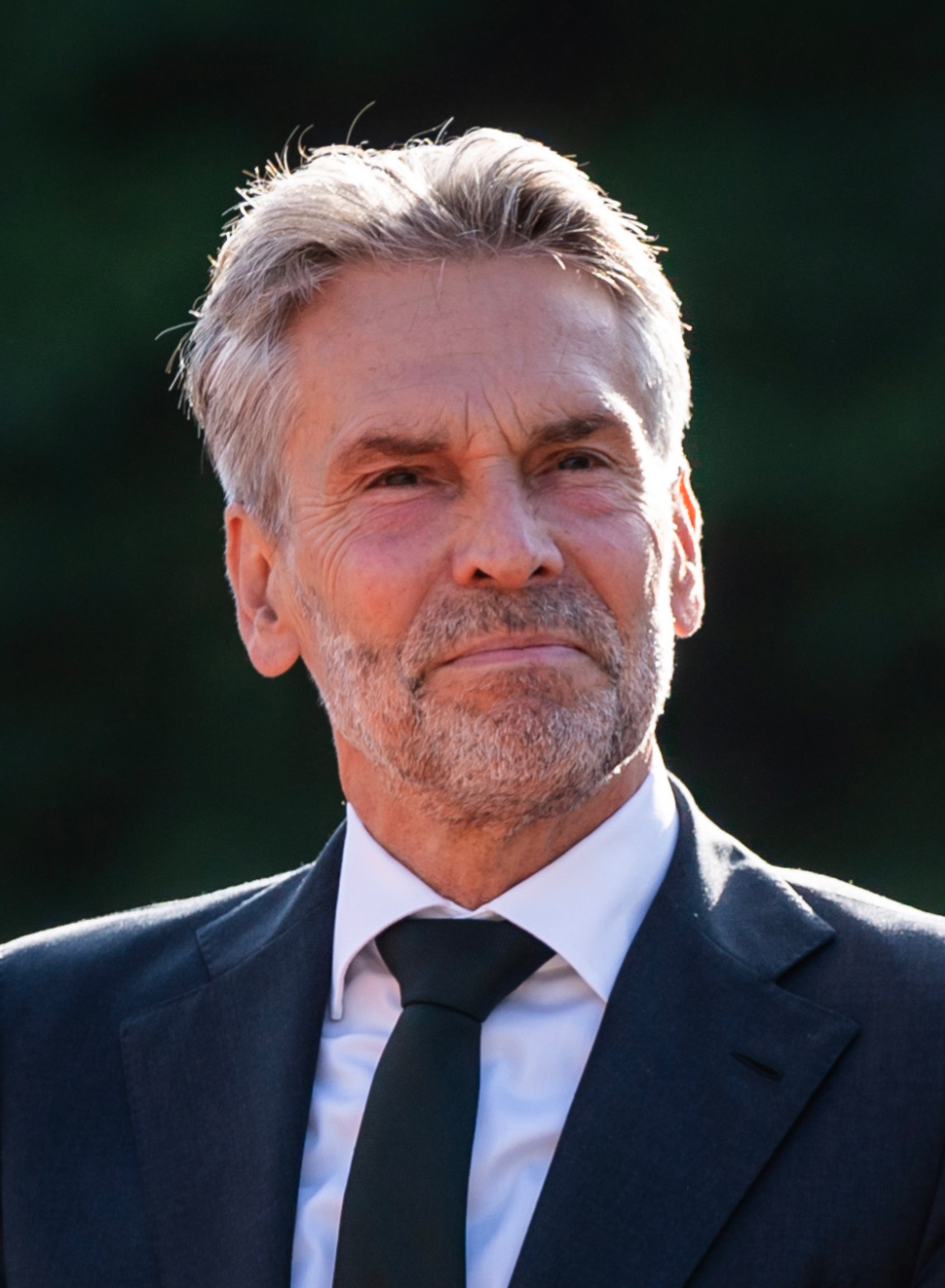
- Date formed: 2 July 2024
- Date dissolved: 23 February 2026; 1 year, 236 days in office (demissionary from 3 June 2025)

People and organisations
- Prime Minister: Dick Schoof
- Deputy Prime Ministers: Fleur Agema (2024–2025); Sophie Hermans; Eddy van Hijum (2024–2025); Mona Keijzer
- No. of ministers: 16
- Member parties: PVV (until 3 June 2025); VVD; NSC (until 22 August 2025); BBB
- Status in legislature: Right-wing majority coalition (2024–2025); Right-wing demissionary minority coalition (2025–2026)

History
- Incoming formation: 2023–2024 formation
- Outgoing formation: 2025–2026 formation
- Election: 2023 election
- Outgoing election: 2025 election
- Legislature terms: 2023–2025
- Predecessor: Fourth Rutte cabinet
- Successor: Jetten cabinet

The Schoof cabinet was the cabinet of the Netherlands from on 2 July 2024 until 23 February 2026. Led by independent politician and civil servant Dick Schoof as prime minister of the Netherlands, the cabinet was formed after the 2023 Dutch general election by the Party for Freedom (PVV), the People's Party for Freedom and Democracy (VVD), New Social Contract (NSC), and the Farmer–Citizen Movement (BBB). It was the first time that the PVV, NSC and BBB have had seats in government. Political analysts concluded that the influence of the Netherlands on EU policy was significantly reduced, when the Schoof cabinet is compared to its predecessor, the Fourth Rutte cabinet.

The cabinet fell after the PVV left the coalition and cabinet on 3 June 2025 due to disagreements on asylum policy. As a demissionary cabinet it continued working until the Jetten cabinet was sworn in on 23 February 2026, but according to convention it was not permitted to make major decisions. NSC left the coalition on 22 August 2025.

== Formation ==
Under informateurs Elbert Dijkgraaf and Richard van Zwol, the four parties (the right-wing populist PVV, the conservative liberal VVD, the Christian democratic NSC, and the agrarian BBB) reached the outline of a coalition agreement, titled "Hope, Courage, and Pride", on 16 May 2024. They agreed to form an extra-parliamentary cabinet, which they defined as a cabinet with a greater distance to parliamentary groups in the House of Representatives. Votes in parliament of coalition parties were not bound on issues not covered in the agreement, such as pensions, as long as they would not impact the budget. Van Zwol was appointed formateur on 22 May. On 11 June, the four parties agreed on the names of candidates and the distribution of ministerial posts. The cabinet was to consist of 29 members, the same amount as its predecessor, of which 16 would be ministers. Three new ministerial posts were created, the Minister of Asylum and Migration, the Minister of Climate and Green Growth, and the Minister of Housing and Spatial Planning; and it includes one minister without portfolio, namely the Minister for Foreign Trade and Development Cooperation. The cabinet was sworn in on 2 July 2024.

Following the formation, the cabinet was tasked with expanding the outline of the coalition agreement into a governing agreement. It was finalized by the Council of Ministers on 6 September 2024 and presented on 13 September, ahead of the presentation of the 2025 Netherlands budget on Prinsjesdag. The Netherlands Bar claimed in October 2024 that nine proposals, including the declaration of an asylum crisis, violated the principles of the rule of law, while another 28 were considered risks. Six proposals, such as the "right to make a mistake", could strengthen the rule of law.

== Cabinet type ==
The coalition parties agreed to form an extra-parliamentary cabinet. In particular, Pieter Omtzigt, the leader of NSC, had insisted on an alternative to the typical majority cabinet after having campaigned on a "new governance culture" in the election. An extra-parliamentary cabinet would be defined by greater distance between the cabinet and the parliamentary groups of coalition parties in the House of Representatives. Informateur Kim Putters recommended the formation of an "extra-parliamentary program cabinet", meaning the coalition parties would draft a shorter coalition agreement, which the cabinet would later expand into a governing agreement.

A few months after its creation, newspaper NRC concluded the Schoof cabinet no longer resembled an extra-parliamentary cabinet. It noted that frequent talks occurred between parliamentary leaders and cabinet members and that coalition parties negotiated with the cabinet about the 2025 budget. Political scientist Arco Timmermans agreed the cabinet could not be considered extra-parliamentary, saying that more effort from parliamentary leaders would be required to keep distance. Wim Voermans, another political scientist, argued that a cabinet could only be extra-parliamentary if there would have been no involvement from the parliament in its formation and the drafting of its agreement.

When asked about responsibilities, Schoof replied that the cabinet handles primary issues, while parliamentary leaders logically take the lead on matters outlined in the coalition agreement.

== Term ==
=== Asylum ===
The coalition agreement included plans to issue a "well-substantiated" statutory instrument to suspend certain provisions of the Aliens Act and to introduce an Asylum Crisis Act without delay. It was agreed that no new asylum applications would be processed and that the Dispersal Act would be revoked. The coalition parties called their migration policy the most stringent and extensive in history. In October 2024, the coalition parties agreed that the proposal to use emergency powers would be abandoned, and new legislation would be introduced to enact asylum measures, most of which were outlined in the coalition agreement, along with some additional provisions. New asylum laws were sent to the Council of State, a required advisory step; the Council said that the government had not made it plausible that these measures would lead to fewer asylum seekers coming to the Netherlands or that these laws would streamline the asylum processes. The Council of State recommended against proceeding with these laws. The Cabinet voted in favour of the laws regardless. They have yet to be discussed in parliament.

In a September 2024 letter to the European Commission, Minister of Asylum and Migration Marjolein Faber requested an opt-out for the Netherlands from European asylum and migration legislation in case of a treaty amendment. Such an exception can only be granted by the European Council, and the Commission responded that no treaty amendments were pending. Hungary later joined the Netherlands in requesting an opt-out.

=== Budgeting ===
Several financial setbacks arose after the coalition parties had settled on the budget in their coalition agreement, and the Bureau for Economic Policy Analysis (CPB) concluded in August 2024 that government finances would deteriorate in the absence of intervention. The leaders of the coalition parties met that same month with the cabinet to finalize the 2025 budget. During talks, NSC leader Pieter Omtzigt threatened to withhold support, because he believed the unemployed and pensioners did not sufficiently benefit. This would have led to the fall of the cabinet.

In response to the Russian invasion of Ukraine, the coalition parties agreed to increase defense spending to adhere to the NATO target of 2% of GDP. Minister Ruben Brekelmans and State Secretary Gijs Tuinman announced €2.4 billion in increased yearly funding for the Netherlands Armed Forces in September 2024. This would go towards attracting more personnel and the purchase of munitions: 46 Leopard 2A8 battle tanks, six F-35 fighter jets, two Anti-Submarine Warfare Frigates, and several NH90 military helicopters. The Netherlands had been left without tanks since 2011 because of budget cuts. In addition, a further €2.6 billion was allocated towards the purchase of short- and medium-range air defense systems.

To decrease the projected budget deficit, cuts for development aid and education were planned as well as an increase in the sales tax on hotel stays, sports, culture, books, and newspapers from 9% to 21% starting in 2026. Opposition parties, holding a majority in the Senate, threatened to block the tax plan because of their opposition to the latter measure. Minister of Finance Eelco Heinen ultimately committed to seeking an alternative to the proposed tax increase on sports, culture, books, and newspapers before its effective date. The measure remained in the plan to avoid a €1.2 billion annual funding gap. Regarding development aid – renamed from "development cooperation" – the cabinet intended to cut the yearly allocated budget by €2.4 billion, over a third of its total, starting in 2027. The percentage of the budget spent on sheltering asylum seekers in the Netherlands would be contained to 10%, and aid related to water management and food security would be prioritized.

The cabinet intended to cut funding education by €2 billion, half of which for higher education and science. The latter would be achieved through lowering the number of international students, increasing tuition for students exceeding the standard duration, reducing money allocated to the Fund for Research and Science, and scrapping research grants. The latter had been created by the previous cabinet. The plans sparked a protest, and opposition parties presented alternative proposals in November 2024. To gain Senate support, coalition parties negotiated with centrist and conservative parties, calling themselves the "unholy alliance". After two weeks, an agreement was struck to reduce the €2 billion cut by €750 million. The Dutch Student Union was relieved that the proposed tuition increase for students exceeding the standard duration was reversed, while Universities of the Netherlands called scientific research the biggest loser of the compromise.

=== November 2024 Amsterdam riots ===
In the wake of the November 2024 Amsterdam riots, in which supporters of the Israeli football club Maccabi Tel Aviv F.C. clashed with pro-Palestinian locals, Schoof said that he was "ashamed" and "horrified by the antisemitic attacks on Israeli citizens." Following an 11 November Council of Ministers meeting, he blamed a specific group of young people with a migration background for the attacks, and he said that the events pointed to a broader integration issue. Integration state secretary Jurgen Nobel stated that a significant portion of Islamic youth did not endorse Dutch norms and values.

On 15 November, State Secretary Nora Achahbar announced her resignation citing "polarizing interactions during the past weeks." Reports circulated of offensive, radical, and potentially racist remarks about the Amsterdam attacks during the Council of Ministers meeting. Schoof invited the leaders of the four coalition parties to join the cabinet for crisis talks to avert a cabinet collapse, and they finally agreed that other cabinet members of NSC would stay on. Schoof denied allegations of racism within the cabinet and coalition parties, and he refused to release minutes of the meeting, which opposition parties had requested. Achahbar later denied that her departure was because of racism, and members of parliament Rosanne Hertzberger and Femke Zeedijk of NSC resigned in her support. Achahbar was replaced by Sandra Palmen.

=== Cabinet changes ===
State Secretary for Tax Affairs and the Tax Administration Folkert Idsinga (NSC) resigned on 1 November 2024, citing a perceived lack of trust by the House. PVV leader Geert Wilders had joined opposition parties in demanding transparency about Idsinga's retirement savings, which included business interests and could create conflicts of interest. His savings, valued at over €6 million in 2023, were managed by a foundation for the duration of his term, and Idsinga refused to provide more visibility, citing his privacy. Idsinga was succeeded by Tjebbe van Oostenbruggen.

=== Agriculture and nitrogen crisis ===
The Netherlands had been mandated by the European Union to stop the deterioration of nature in Natura 2000 sites by 2030, and goals with regard to nitrogen deposition had been enshrined in national legislation. The coalition agreement reduced the fund allocated towards addressing the nitrogen crisis from €25 billion to €5 billion. In September 2024, Minister Femke Wiersma terminated the National Program for Rural Areas, which had been created by the fourth Rutte cabinet in response to the crisis and which tasked provinces with devising plans to improve the quality of nature and water based on a national fund.

Wiersma presented the outline of her alternative plans and a provisional breakdown of the €5 billion in funding in late November 2024. The cabinet aimed to increase agricultural lands designated as nature reserves from 100,000 ha (250,000 acres) to 280,000 ha (690,000 acres) by expanding subsidies for farmers. The cabinet allocated between €1.25 billion and €2.5 billion towards innovations to reduce nitrogen emissions, and it planned to set emissions targets for farms instead of prescribing certain measures. The same amount would be available for a voluntary buyout scheme for farmers considering to leave the sector. Furthermore, Wiersma plans to postpone enforcement of nitrogen emissions regulations for a group of farmers left without a permit due to a 2019 Court of State ruling for another three years. The Netherlands Agricultural and Horticultural Association responded that farmers would remain uncertain about their future because of the latter.

In December 2024, the Administrative Jurisdiction Division of the Council of State ruled that unused nitrogen emission rights could no longer be allocated to other construction and expansion projects. Instead, a new permit would be required. The judgement retroactively invalidated such usage of the rights during the past five years, and Schoof established a committee comprising several cabinet members to explore measures to prevent widespread project delays.

== Fall of the cabinet ==
=== Exit of the PVV ===
On 26 May 2025, PVV leader Geert Wilders presented a ten-point plan for new asylum measures, including the rejection of all asylum seekers and the return to their home country of Syrians who have applied for asylum or are in the Netherlands on temporary visas.

On 2 June, a coalition meeting between the parties took place. The other coalition parties maintained that the PVV could simply get down to work on Wilders' proposed new plan. By his own admission, Wilders himself did not notice any willingness among his coalition colleagues to do anything immediately. He stated to the press that it "doesn't look good" and that they would "sleep on it another night." On 3 June, after a brief meeting in which Wilders hoped that the leaders of the partners would agree to his plan, he announced that he would withdraw his ministers from the cabinet. The coalition governing partners and the opposition accused him of not taking responsibility. At the request of nine ministers of the PVV, King Willem-Alexander relieved them of their duties, and the resignations tendered by other ministers were considered by the King. The cabinet was transformed into a caretaker cabinet (demissionary cabinet).

=== Exit of NSC ===
On 22 August 2025, the Minister of Foreign Affairs, Caspar Veldkamp, resigned after not agreeing with the ministers and state secretaries of VVD and BBB about taking further steps to put pressure on Israel, after the IDF launched an invasion into Gaza City and the deteriorating conditions for Palestinians on the West Bank. The same evening the rest of ministers and state secretaries of NSC also stepped down.

== Cabinet members ==
The party affiliations shown below indicate the party by which a cabinet member was given. Some cabinet members are a member of a different party or of no party.

Prime minister and deputy prime ministers in the Schoof cabinet
Title	Minister			Term of office	
Title	Image	Name	Party	Start	End
Prime Minister	Dick Schoof	Dick Schoof	Not affiliated	2 July 2024	23 February 2026
Deputy Prime Minister	Fleur Agema	Fleur Agema	PVV	2 July 2024	3 June 2025 (Note: The Party for Freedom left the coalition and cabinet on 3 June 2025.)
Deputy Prime Minister	Sophie Hermans	Sophie Hermans	VVD	2 July 2024	23 February 2026
Deputy Prime Minister	Eddy van Hijum	Eddy van Hijum	NSC	2 July 2024	22 August 2025 (Note: New Social Contract left the coalition and cabinet on 22 August 2025.)
Deputy Prime Minister	Mona Keijzer	Mona Keijzer	BBB	2 July 2024	23 February 2026

Ministers in the Schoof cabinet
Title	Minister			Term of office	
Title	Image	Name	Party	Start	End
Minister of General Affairs	Dick Schoof	Dick Schoof	Not affiliated	2 July 2024	23 February 2026
Minister of Climate Policy and Green Growth	Sophie Hermans	Sophie Hermans	VVD	2 July 2024	23 February 2026
Minister of Housing and Spatial Planning	Mona Keijzer	Mona Keijzer	BBB	2 July 2024	23 February 2026
Minister of Foreign Affairs	Caspar Veldkamp	Caspar Veldkamp	NSC	2 July 2024	22 August 2025
Minister of Foreign Affairs	Ruben Brekelmans	Ruben Brekelmans (ad interim)	VVD	22 August 2025	5 September 2025
Minister of Foreign Affairs	David van Weel	David van Weel	VVD	5 September 2025	23 February 2026
Minister of Justice and Security	David van Weel	David van Weel	VVD	2 July 2024	5 September 2025 (Note: Appointed as Minister of Foreign Affairs.)
Minister of Justice and Security	Foort van Oosten	Foort van Oosten	VVD	5 September 2025	23 February 2026
Minister of the Interior and Kingdom Relations	Judith Uitermark	Judith Uitermark	NSC	2 July 2024	22 August 2025
Minister of the Interior and Kingdom Relations	David van Weel	David van Weel (ad interim)	VVD	22 August 2025	5 September 2025
Minister of the Interior and Kingdom Relations		Frank Rijkaart	BBB	5 September 2025	23 February 2026
Minister of Education, Culture and Science	Eppo Bruins	Eppo Bruins	NSC	2 July 2024	22 August 2025
Minister of Education, Culture and Science	Sophie Hermans	Sophie Hermans (ad interim)	VVD	22 August 2025	5 September 2025
Minister of Education, Culture and Science		Gouke Moes	BBB	5 September 2025	23 February 2026
Minister of Finance	Eelco Heinen	Eelco Heinen	VVD	2 July 2024	Incumbent (Note: Retained this position in the Jetten cabinet.)
Minister of Defence	Ruben Brekelmans	Ruben Brekelmans	VVD	2 July 2024	23 February 2026
Minister of Infrastructure and Water Management	Barry Madlener	Barry Madlener	PVV	2 July 2024	3 June 2025
Minister of Infrastructure and Water Management	Sophie Hermans	Sophie Hermans (ad interim)	VVD	3 June 2025	19 June 2025
Minister of Infrastructure and Water Management	Robert Tieman	Robert Tieman	BBB	19 June 2025	23 February 2026
Minister of Economic Affairs	Dirk Beljaarts	Dirk Beljaarts	PVV	2 July 2024	3 June 2025
Minister of Economic Affairs	Eelco Heinen	Eelco Heinen (ad interim)	VVD	3 June 2025	19 June 2025
Minister of Economic Affairs	Vincent Karremans	Vincent Karremans	VVD	19 June 2025	23 February 2026
Minister of Agriculture, Fisheries, Food Security and Nature	Femke Wiersma	Femke Wiersma	BBB	2 July 2024	23 February 2026
Minister of Social Affairs and Employment	Eddy van Hijum	Eddy van Hijum	NSC	2 July 2024	22 August 2025
Minister of Social Affairs and Employment	Mona Keijzer	Mona Keijzer (ad interim)	BBB	22 August 2025	5 September 2025
Minister of Social Affairs and Employment	Mariëlle Paul	Mariëlle Paul	VVD	5 September 2025	23 February 2026
Minister of Health, Welfare and Sport	Fleur Agema	Fleur Agema	PVV	2 July 2024	3 June 2025
Minister of Health, Welfare and Sport	Eddy van Hijum	Eddy van Hijum (ad interim)	NSC	3 June 2025	19 June 2025
Minister of Health, Welfare and Sport		Daniëlle Jansen	NSC	19 June 2025	22 August 2025
Minister of Health, Welfare and Sport	Robert Tieman	Robert Tieman (ad interim)	BBB	22 August 2025	5 September 2025
Minister of Health, Welfare and Sport	Jan Anthonie Bruijn	Jan Anthonie Bruijn	VVD	5 September 2025	23 February 2026
Minister of Asylum and Migration	Marjolein Faber	Marjolein Faber	PVV	2 July 2024	3 June 2025
Minister of Asylum and Migration	David van Weel	David van Weel	VVD	3 June 2025 (Note: From 19 June 2025, the portfolio of the Minister of Asylum and Migration was divided among the Minister of Justice and Security, the Minister of Social Affairs and Employment, and the Minister of Housing and Spatial Planning. The latter two were appointed as ministers without portfolio within the Ministry of Asylum and Migration.)	23 February 2026
Minister for Asylum and Migration (Note: Minister without portfolio within the Ministry of Asylum and Migration.)	Eddy van Hijum	Eddy van Hijum	NSC	19 June 2025	22 August 2025
Minister for Asylum and Migration	Mona Keijzer	Mona Keijzer	BBB	19 June 2025	23 February 2026
Minister for Foreign Trade and Development (Note: Minister without portfolio within the Ministry of Foreign Affairs.)	Reinette Klever	Reinette Klever	PVV	2 July 2024	3 June 2025
Minister for Foreign Trade and Development	Caspar Veldkamp	Caspar Veldkamp (ad interim)	NSC	3 June 2025	19 June 2025 (Note: From 19 June 2025, the portfolio of the Minister for Foreign Trade and Development was divided among the Minister of Foreign Affairs and a newly appointed State Secretary for Foreign Trade.)

State secretaries in the Schoof cabinet
Ministry	Portfolio	State secretary			Term of office	
Ministry	Portfolio	Image	Name	Party	Start	End
Foreign Affairs	Foreign Trade	Hanneke Boerma	Hanneke Boerma	NSC	19 June 2025	22 August 2025
Foreign Affairs	Foreign Trade	Aukje de Vries	Aukje de Vries	VVD	5 September 2025	23 February 2026
Justice and Security	Detention and Protection	Ingrid Coenradie	Ingrid Coenradie	PVV	2 July 2024	3 June 2025 (Note: From 19 June 2025, the portfolio of the State Secretary for Detention and Protection was divided among the State Secretary for Legal Protection and the State Secretary for Participation and Integration.)
Justice and Security	Legal Protection	Teun Struycken	Teun Struycken	Indep. (Note: Teun Struycken joined the cabinet on behalf of New Social Contract, but is not affiliated with the party.)	2 July 2024	22 August 2025
Justice and Security	Legal Protection		Arno Rutte	VVD	5 September 2025	23 February 2026
Interior and Kingdom Relations	Digitalisation and Kingdom Relations	Zsolt Szabó	Zsolt Szabó	PVV	2 July 2024	3 June 2025
Interior and Kingdom Relations	Reparations for Groningen		Eddie van Marum	BBB	2 July 2024	19 June 2025
Interior and Kingdom Relations	Digitalisation, Kingdom Relations and Reparations for Groningen		Eddie van Marum	BBB	19 June 2025	23 February 2026
Education, Culture and Science	Primary and Secondary Education and Equal Opportunities	Mariëlle Paul	Mariëlle Paul	VVD	2 July 2024	5 September 2025 (Note: Appointed as Minister of Social Affairs and Employment.)
Education, Culture and Science	Primary and Secondary Education and Equal Opportunities	Koen Becking	Koen Becking	VVD	5 September 2025	23 February 2026
Finance	Tax Affairs and the Tax Administration		Folkert Idsinga	NSC	2 July 2024	1 November 2024 (Note: Resigned from this position.)
Finance	Benefits and Customs		Nora Achahbar	NSC	2 July 2024	15 November 2024
Finance	Tax Affairs, the Tax Administration and Customs	Tjebbe van Oostenbruggen	Tjebbe van Oostenbruggen	NSC	15 November 2024	22 August 2025
Finance	Tax Affairs, the Tax Administration and Customs		Eugène Heijnen	BBB	5 September 2025	23 February 2026
Finance	Benefits and Redress		Sandra Palmen	NSC	12 December 2024	22 August 2025
Finance	Benefits and Redress		Sandra Palmen	Indep.	5 September 2025	Incumbent
Defence	Arms Procurement and Personnel	Gijs Tuinman	Gijs Tuinman	BBB	2 July 2024	23 February 2026
Infrastructure and Water Management	Environment and Public Transport	Chris Jansen	Chris Jansen	PVV	2 July 2024	3 June 2025
Infrastructure and Water Management	Environment and Public Transport	Thierry Aartsen	Thierry Aartsen	VVD	19 June 2025	23 February 2026
Agriculture, Fisheries, Food Security and Nature	Fisheries, Food Security, Horticulture and Nature Conservation	Jean Rummenie	Jean Rummenie	BBB	2 July 2024	23 February 2026
Social Affairs and Employment	Participation and Integration	Jurgen Nobel	Jurgen Nobel	VVD	2 July 2024	23 February 2026
Health, Welfare and Sport	Long-term and Social Care	Vicky Maeijer	Vicky Maeijer	PVV	2 July 2024	3 June 2025
Health, Welfare and Sport	Long-term and Social Care		Nicki Pouw-Verweij	BBB	19 June 2025	23 February 2026
Health, Welfare and Sport	Youth, Prevention and Sport	Vincent Karremans	Vincent Karremans	VVD	2 July 2024	19 June 2025 (Note: Appointed as Minister of Economic Affairs.)
Health, Welfare and Sport	Youth, Prevention and Sport	Judith Tielen	Judith Tielen	VVD	19 June 2025	23 February 2026

== See also ==
- First Balkenende cabinet
- First Schüssel government
