= David van Weel =

Dutch civil servant and diplomat (born 1976)

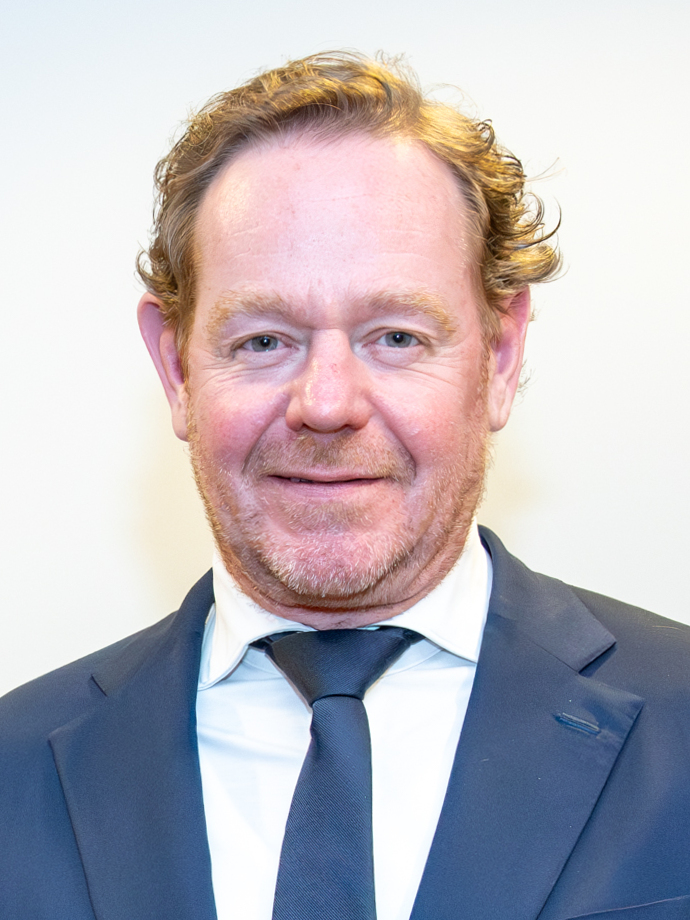
- Van Weel in 2025

Minister of Justice and Security
- Incumbent
- Assumed office 23 February 2026
- Prime Minister: Rob Jetten
- Preceded by: Foort van Oosten
- In office 2 July 2024 – 5 September 2025
- Prime Minister: Dick Schoof
- Preceded by: Dilan Yeşilgöz
- Succeeded by: Foort van Oosten

Minister of Foreign Affairs
- In office 5 September 2025 – 23 February 2026
- Prime Minister: Dick Schoof
- Preceded by: Caspar Veldkamp
- Succeeded by: Tom Berendsen

Minister of Asylum and Migration
- In office 19 June 2025 – 23 February 2026
- Prime Minister: Dick Schoof
- Preceded by: Marjolein Faber
- Succeeded by: Bart van den Brink

NATO Assistant Secretary General for Innovation, Cyber defence and Hybrid threats
- In office 1 November 2020 – 2 July 2024
- Secretary General: Jens Stoltenberg
- Preceded by: Antonio Missiroli
- Succeeded by: Jean Ellermann-Kingombe

Personal details
- Born: David Martijn van Weel; 4 August 1976 (age 50) Rotterdam, Netherlands
- Party: VVD (since 2018)
- Children: 3
- Education: University of Amsterdam
- Occupation: Naval officer; diplomat

David Martijn van Weel (born 4 August 1976) is a Dutch civil servant and diplomat who has served as Minister of Justice and Security since February 2026 in the Jetten cabinet, a role he previously held from July 2024 to September 2025 in the Schoof cabinet. Van Weel also served Minister of Foreign Affairs and of Asylum and Migration in the Schoof cabinet from September and June 2025, respectively, to February 2026.

== Career ==
Starting in 2016, Van Weel served as advisor on foreign affairs and defence to Prime Minister Mark Rutte. In 2020, he became Assistant Secretary General for Innovation, Cyber defence and Hybrid threats of NATO, under Secretary General Jens Stoltenberg. Broadcaster NOS noted that Van Weel had more frequent public appearances following the start of the Russian invasion of Ukraine in February 2022.

After the PVV, VVD, NSC, and BBB formed the Schoof cabinet, Van Weel was sworn in as Minister of Justice and Security on 2 July 2024, succeeding Dilan Yeşilgöz. He is serving on behalf of the conservative-liberal People's Party for Freedom and Democracy (VVD), which he joined in 2018. Van Weel told that his priorities were to increase society's resilience in light of increased geopolitical tensions, to continue tackling subversive organized crime, and to increase trust in the rule of law. Responding to a clause in the coalition agreement, he said that he wanted to set limits on protests within the right to protest, citing highway blockades by the environmentalist movement Extinction Rebellion.

He was working on an approach to combat antisemitism when the November 2024 Amsterdam riots occurred, in which supporters of the Israeli football club Maccabi Tel Aviv F.C. were targeted. Van Weel postponed the presentation of his plan, scheduled a week after the attack, by a week to incorporate more recent suggestions. The strategy contained €4.5 million in yearly funding and a new task force to increase the safety of Jewish citizens. In addition, the cabinet reiterated its commitment to impose limits on demonstrations, to criminalize the glorification of terrorism, and to broaden the grounds for revoking the Dutch nationality from dual citizens.

On 3 June 2025, Van Weel also became Minister of Asylum and Migration upon the resignation of Marjolein Faber. When foreign affairs minister Caspar Veldkamp resigned, he took over the post on 5 September 2025, and he gave up his role as Minister of Justice and Security.

In September 2025, Van Weel said that the Netherlands would not support the UN report that described the situation in the Gaza Strip as genocide and would instead wait for the ICJ's decision.

== Personal life ==
Van Weel and his family moved back to Rotterdam when he became a minister.

Political offices
Preceded by Dilan Yeşilgöz	Minister of Justice and Security; 2024–2025	Succeeded by Foort van Oosten
Preceded by Marjolein Faber	Minister of Asylum and Migration; 2025–present	Incumbent
Preceded by Caspar Veldkamp	Minister of Foreign Affairs; 2025–present	Incumbent
