= Marjolein Faber =

Dutch politician (born 1960)

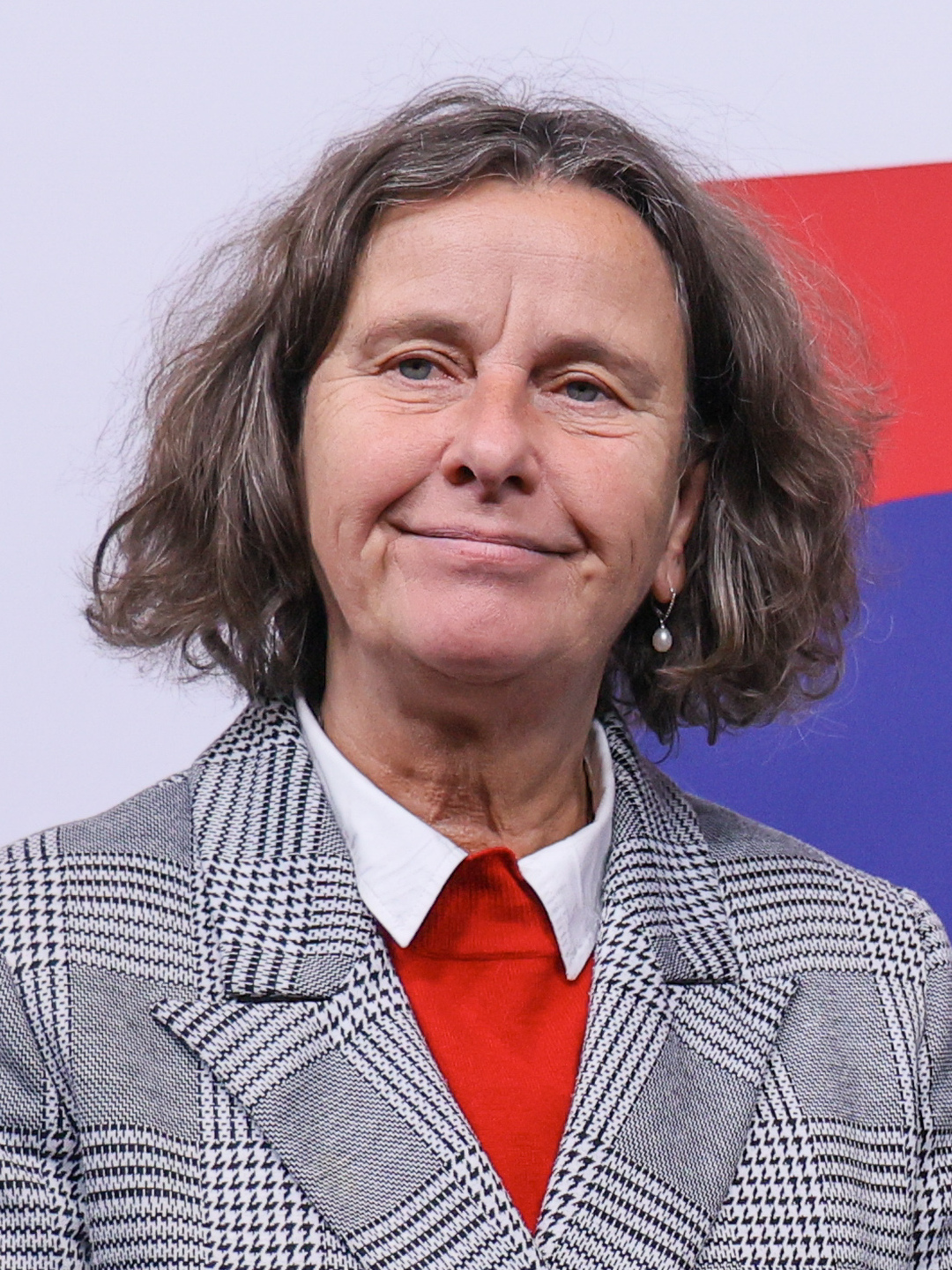
- Faber in 2025

Minister of Asylum and Migration
- In office 2 July 2024 – 3 June 2025
- Prime Minister: Dick Schoof
- Preceded by: Office established (Note: Eric van der Burg as state secretary within the Ministry of Justice and Security)
- Succeeded by: David van Weel (acting)

Member of the House of Representatives
- Incumbent
- Assumed office 12 November 2025
- In office 6 December 2023 – 2 July 2024
- Succeeded by: Nico Uppelschoten

Leader of the Party for Freedom in the Senate
- In office 10 June 2014 – 6 December 2023
- Preceded by: Marcel de Graaff
- Succeeded by: Alexander van Hattem

Member of the Senate
- In office 7 June 2011 – 6 December 2023

Member of the Provincial Council of Gelderland
- In office 10 March 2011 – 20 December 2023

Personal details
- Born: Marjolein Hillegonda Monica van de Klashorst; 16 June 1960 (age 66) Amersfoort, Netherlands
- Party: PVV (since 2009)
- Children: 2
- Education: Corderius College
- Occupation: Nuclear laboratory technician Technology specialist Politician

Marjolein Hillegonda Monica Faber-van de Klashorst (born 16 June 1960) is a Dutch politician for the right-wing populist Party for Freedom (PVV), who served as Minister of Asylum and Migration in the Schoof cabinet from 2 July 2024 to 3 June 2025. Previously, she was a member of the Provincial Council of Gelderland (2011–2023), of the Senate (2011–2023), and of the House of Representatives (2023–2024).

== Early life and career ==
Faber was raised in Amersfoort as the daughter of a butcher, and she attended secondary school at MAVO and HAVO levels. She started working as a laboratory technician at the Amersfoort Lichtenberg hospital in 1978, and she was simultaneously educated in nuclear medicine in Utrecht until 1984. She switched her career to the IT sector in 1986, and she worked as a software engineer and IT specialist at various companies.

== Legislative career ==
=== 2011–2023: Senate and Provincial Council ===
In 2009, she joined the PVV and applied for the Dutch general election of 2010. She was 32nd on the candidate list and was not elected.

Faber became a member of the Provincial Council of Gelderland for the Party for Freedom on 10 March 2011. She joined the Senate later that year, and she served as the PVV's parliamentary leader in the body starting on 10 June 2014, replacing Marcel de Graaff. Describing herself to newspaper De Gelderlander, Faber said she has "hardline stances without nuance, such as prohibiting the Quran, closing all mosques, and getting rid of Islam". She also referred to her colleagues in the provincial council as fake representatives for allegedly not listening to the will of the people. She was deprived of the floor in the Senate after making the same accusation. She elaborated that she believed fellow senators were failing to protect the Netherlands, claiming the Dutch population was being replaced by an Islamic population.

In 2015, reports came out that Faber had paid her son's company for maintaining the PVV Gelderland website with funds of the party's parliamentary group. It was later discovered that Faber's son had also created the website for the PVV parliamentary group in the Senate. She had earlier uncovered irregularities in the travel expenses of Co Verdaas, which led to his resignation from the second Rutte cabinet. In 2017, Faber – together with PVV members Wilders and Markuszower – protested against the appointment of PvdA member Ahmed Marcouch as mayor of Arnhem, with a large banner displaying the text "No Arnhemmistan! We are losing our country!".

During the campaign for 2019 provincial elections, she argued for tax relief, and expressed her opposition to multiculturalism. In response to a stabbing incident in Groningen that same year, she claimed the perpetrator had a North-African skin colour. Despite the three victims stating the perpetrator was white, Faber stuck to her original claim. She complained about Dutch funding for the United Nations in a 2020 debate, and she said that organization was engaged in antisemitism, terrorism, and omvolking. Prime Minister Mark Rutte subsequently noted the latter term originated in Nazi ideology. She was once again deprived of the floor in the Senate when she called the fourth Rutte cabinet a fifth column because of its immigration policy.

In 2017, Faber became a member of the NATO Parliamentary Assembly on behalf of the Senate. She continued this as member of the House of Representative until she became minister in July 2024.

=== 2023–2024: House of Representatives ===
Faber was elected to the House of Representatives in November 2023, and she became the PVV's spokesperson for criminal law and human trafficking. This ended her memberships of the Senate and the Provincial Council of Gelderland. She advocated solving a shortage of prison cells by implementing austerity measures in the prison regime, and she opined that the Public Prosecution Service was demanding too lenient sentences. In the House of Representatives, Faber was a member of five standing committees: Foreign Affairs, European Affairs, Justice and Security, Kingdom Relations, and Agriculture, Nature and Food Quality.

== Executive career ==
=== Since 2024: Minister of Asylum and Migration ===
Faber was nominated in June 2024 to serve as Minister of Asylum and Migration in the new Schoof cabinet, leading a new ministry. Her selection was affirmed following crisis talks between the coalition parties after VVD leader Dilan Yeşilgöz had raised Faber's past controversial statements and tone. Faber apologized in confirmation hearings for her earlier usage of the word omvolking, while repeating her worries about demographic trends in the Netherlands. The cabinet was sworn in on 2 July 2024. The coalition parties called their migration policy the most stringent and extensive in history.

The coalition agreement included plans to issue a "well-substantiated" statutory instrument to suspend certain provisions of the Aliens Act and to introduce an Asylum Crisis Act without delay, thereby declaring an asylum crisis. Faber announced her intent in early September 2024 to do the former by royal decree, bypassing parliamentary consultation. Opposition parties criticized the proposed usage of emergency powers, and documents of the Ministries of Justice and Security and of the Interior and Kingdom Relations, requested by the House of Representatives, showed that civil servants had advised against it, contending that the situation was unlikely to meet the threshold for exceptional circumstances. Minister of the Interior and Kingdom Relations Judith Uitermark (NSC) emphasized the need for a proper legal rationale. Coalition parties VVD and NSC urged Faber to prepare an expedited law in parallel, and the Senate, where opposition parties held a majority, passed a motion requesting the same, while calling the current approach undesirable. While Prime Minister Dick Schoof facilitated negotiations about asylum measures between the PVV and NSC, Faber continued to work on a well-substantiated reasoning for the use of emergency powers. She declared that her finished reasoning had become part of the negotiations, but she retracted her statement the same day after it was denied by coalition parties. In late October 2024, an agreement on asylum measures was reached among coalition parties under Schoof's leadership that excluded the use of emergency powers. The Council of Ministers approved three bills of Faber in December 2024: the Asylum Emergency Measures Act, a bill re-establishing the two-tier asylum system, and the Return and Detention of Aliens Act.

In a September 2024 letter to the European Commission, she requested an opt-out for the Netherlands from European asylum and migration legislation in case of a treaty amendment. Such an exception can only be granted by the European Council, and the Commission responded that no treaty amendments were pending. Hungary later joined the Netherlands in requesting an opt-out. Additionally, Faber implemented the coalition agreement's provision to discontinue national funding for shelter facilities for rejected asylum seekers. In October 2024, following a working visit to Denmark, she proposed installing signs at asylum centers to emphasize the government's intent for their return. The House of Representatives rejected her plans through a motion that was supported by coalition party NSC.

== Personal life ==
Faber is married and has two children.

== Electoral history ==
Electoral history of Marjolein Faber
Year	Body	Party	Pos.	Votes	Result		Ref.
Year	Body	Party	Pos.	Votes	Party seats	Individual	Ref.
2010	House of Representatives	Party for Freedom	32	327	24	Lost	
2015	Senate	Party for Freedom	1	2,083 (Note: Weighted votes)	9	Won	
2019	Senate	Party for Freedom	1	22 (Note: Non-weighted votes)	5	Won	
2021	House of Representatives	Party for Freedom	18	1,057	17	Lost	
2023	Senate	Party for Freedom	1		4	Won	
2023	House of Representatives	Party for Freedom	7	4,390	37	Won	
2025	House of Representatives	Party for Freedom	9	9,813	26	Won	

== Notes ==
Political offices
Office established	Minister of Asylum and Migration; 2024–2025	Succeeded by David van Weel
