= Dick Schoof =

Prime Minister of the Netherlands from 2024 to 2026

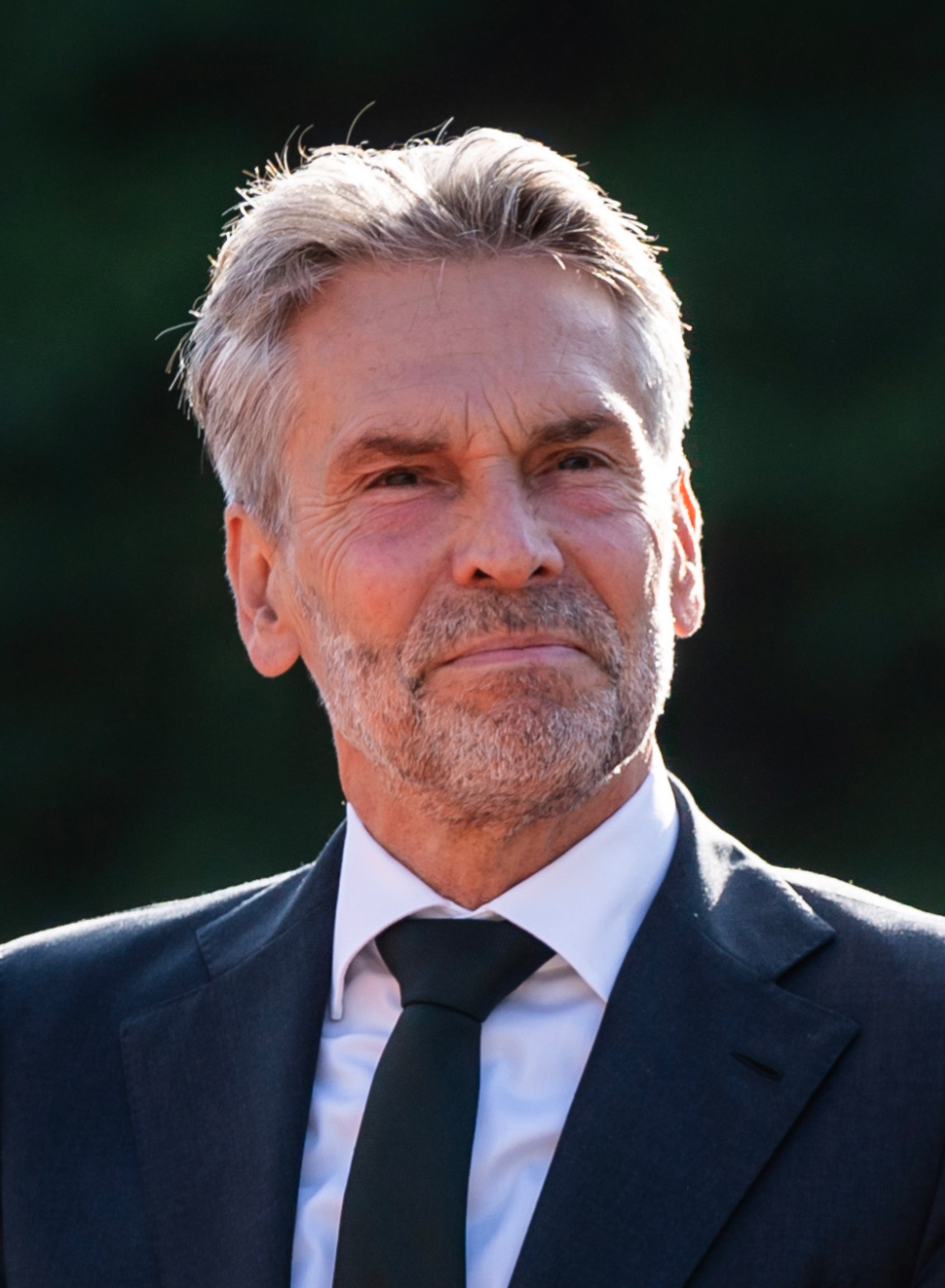
- Schoof in 2025

Prime Minister of the Netherlands
- In office 2 July 2024 – 23 February 2026
- Monarch: Willem-Alexander
- Deputy: See list: Fleur Agema; (2024–2025); Eddy van Hijum; (2024–2025); Mona Keijzer; Sophie Hermans
- Preceded by: Mark Rutte
- Succeeded by: Rob Jetten
Government offices
Secretary-General of the Ministry of Justice and Security
In office 1 March 2020 – 28 May 2024
Prime Minister	Mark Rutte
Minister	Ferdinand Grapperhaus; Dilan Yeşilgöz
Preceded by	Siebe Riedstra
Succeeded by	Anneke van Dijk
Director-General of the General Intelligence and Security Service
In office 16 November 2018 – 1 March 2020
Prime Minister	Mark Rutte
Minister	Kajsa Ollongren; Raymond Knops (acting)
Preceded by	Rob Bertholee
Succeeded by	Erik Akerboom
National Coordinator for Security and Counterterrorism
In office 1 March 2013 – 16 November 2018
Prime Minister	Mark Rutte
Minister	Ivo Opstelten; Stef Blok (acting); Ard van der Steur; Stef Blok; Ferdinand Grapperhaus
Preceded by	Erik Akerboom
Succeeded by	Pieter-Jaap Aalbersberg
Chief Director of the Immigration and Naturalisation Service
In office 1 December 1999 – 1 March 2003
Prime Minister	Wim Kok; Jan Peter Balkenende
Minister	Job Cohen; Ella Kalsbeek; Hilbrand Nawijn
Preceded by	J. G. Bos
Succeeded by	P. W. A. Veld

Personal details
- Born: Hendrikus Wilhelmus Maria Schoof; 8 March 1957 (age 69) Santpoort, Netherlands
- Party: Independent (2021–present)
- Other political affiliations: Labour (until 2021) (Note: According to Parlement.com, he was a member for 'more than 30 years'. The exact time is not specified)
- Spouse: Yolanda Senf (divorced)
- Domestic partner: Loes Meurs
- Children: 2
- Education: Radboud University (MSc)

Hendrikus Wilhelmus Maria "Dick" Schoof (Note: Dutch: [ɦɛnˈdrikʏs ʋɪlˈɦɛlmʏs maˈrijaː dɪk sxoːf]) (born 8 March 1957) is a Dutch politician and civil servant who served as the prime minister of the Netherlands from July 2024 to February 2026, leading the Schoof cabinet.

Schoof had a long career in civil service. He was director-general for public order and safety at the Ministry of the Interior and Kingdom Relations from 2003 to 2010, and director-general at the Ministry of Justice and Security from 2010 to 2013. From 2013 to 2018, he worked as National Coordinator for Security and Counterterrorism and from 2018 to 2020 as director-general of the General Intelligence and Security Service. From 2020 to 2024, he held the position of secretary-general of the Ministry of Justice and Security.

Schoof, who is politically unaffiliated, led a coalition government comprising the PVV, VVD, NSC, and BBB, notable for being the most right-wing in recent Dutch history. The coalition collapsed in June 2025, after which Schoof remained a caretaker prime minister until February 2026.

== Early life and education ==
Hendrikus Wilhelmus Maria Schoof was born on 8 March 1957 in Santpoort into a Catholic family, as the second-youngest of seven children (six sons and one daughter). Schoof's father was a municipal civil servant, including for social services. His older brother Nico Schoof is a former mayor of the municipalities of Akersloot, Limmen, Heiloo, and Alphen aan den Rijn and a member of the Democrats 66 party. Schoof's maternal grandfather, Wim Pommerel, was executed by the Germans toward the end of World War II, for establishing an illegal network of telephone connections.

At the age of eight, Schoof moved with his family to Hengelo, where he attended Lyceum De Grundel. From 1975 to 1982, he studied urban and regional planning at Radboud University. Schoof was a member of its rowing-oriented student association Phocas, and served as its chair.

== Early career ==
Schoof began his career as a policy advisor on education at the Association of Netherlands Municipalities, and became a civil servant at the Ministry of Education and Sciences in 1988. He helped dissolve the primary school construction department, which he headed, under State Secretary Jacques Wallage. He helped broker a compromise between the Christian Democratic Appeal and the Labour Party when both parties disagreed whether schools or municipalities should be responsible for the maintenance of school buildings.

From 1996, Schoof held various senior positions in the field of security. He served as deputy secretary-general at the Ministry of Justice and Security.

He was then appointed chief director of the Immigration and Naturalisation Service (IND) in 1999. The Netherlands was experiencing a relatively high influx of asylum seekers as a result of the Kosovo War, and the organization had a significant backlog of requests. Schoof was responsible for implementing reforms to the Aliens Act by State Secretary for Justice Job Cohen in 2001 that simplified the asylum procedure, and he worked to deport applicants that did not qualify. The number of asylum applications declined, which Schoof attributed to stricter migration policies. A later government evaluation concluded that the legislation had a more limited impact, suggesting that external factors were the primary drivers of the drop.

Schoof left the IND to become director-general for public order and safety at the Ministry of the Interior and Kingdom Relations in 2003. In that position, he was in charge of restructuring the police force from a number of regional organisations into a single National Police Corps.

== National security career ==
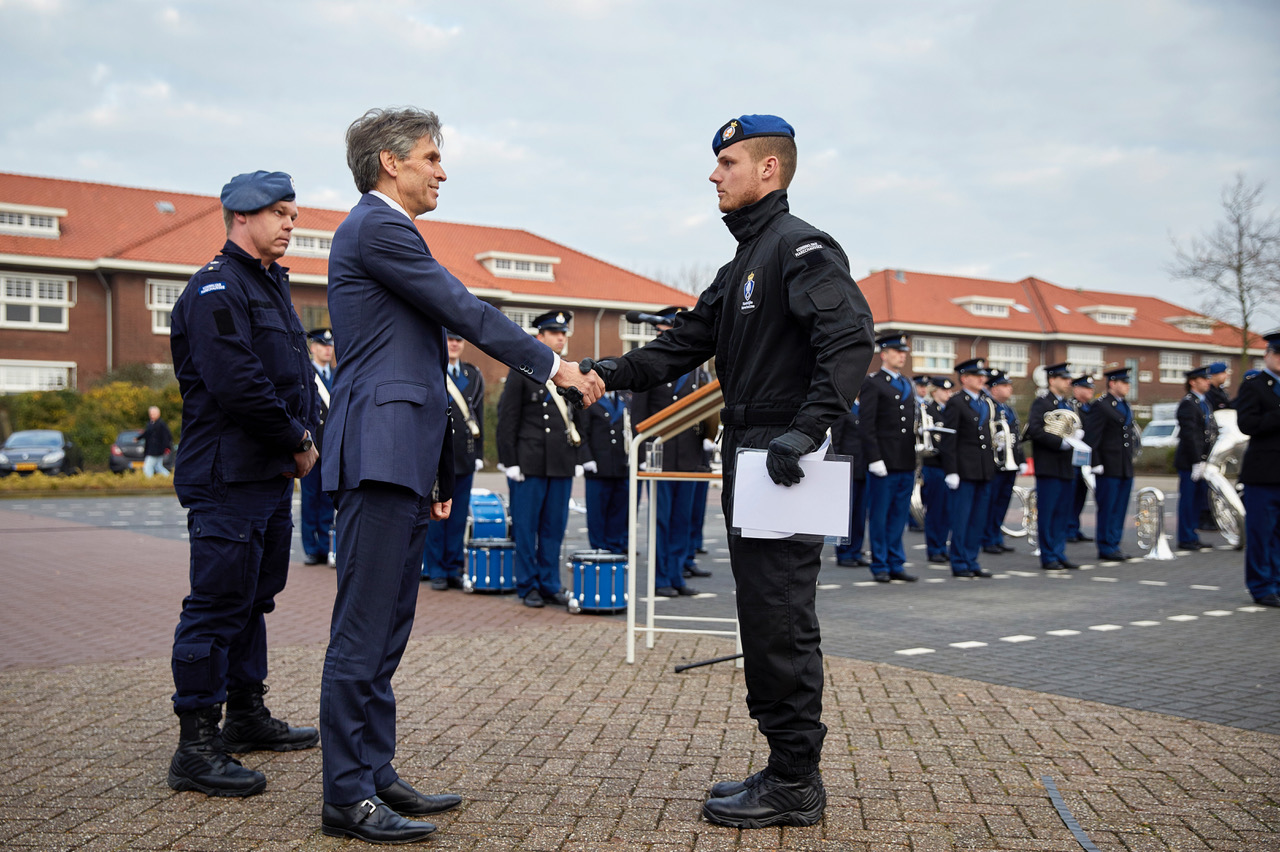
Schoof during the High-Risk Security (HRB) graduation ceremony of the Royal Marechaussee (The Hague, 16 December 2016)

Schoof served as director-general at the Ministry of Justice and Security from 2010 to 2013.

In 2013 Schoof was appointed National Coordinator for Security and Counterterrorism (NCTV). He allowed his employees to monitor potential terrorists on social media through fake profiles despite warnings from his attorneys. Following the shooting down of Malaysia Airlines Flight 17 in 2014 after it left Schiphol airport in Amsterdam, he coordinated the Dutch crisis response, strengthening his relationship with Prime Minister Mark Rutte. In 2022, a court in the Netherlands convicted three men linked to the Russian military of murder in connection with the plane's destruction, which killed all passengers on board, including 196 Dutch citizens. When Schoof requested an independent investigation by Twente University into the performance of his office, he and his employees interfered with the questions, the composition of the committee and the publication date. He exerted pressure to soften its main conclusion. For example, the word "badly" was changed to "not well". Schoof was also responsible for internal security, addressing both Islamist radicalisation and the recruitment of ISIS fighters in the Netherlands.

Under Schoof's leadership, the NCTV was accused by civil rights group Bits of Freedom of carrying out illegal surveillance of Dutch citizens, especially Muslims, on the internet. Starting in 2017, the NCTV launched a program of using private investigators to infiltrate mosques and spy on them. In 2019, an investigation by GeenStijl determined that Schoof ordered subordinates to create fake social media profiles to monitor "potential terrorists". He warned the education ministry and the municipality of Amsterdam that supporters of the Salafi movement were on the board of an Islamic school. He was found to have exerted pressure to attenuate the conclusions of the investigations.

Schoof led the General Intelligence and Security Service as director-general from 2018 to 2020. De Volkskrant wrote that his relatively short tenure was characterized by a culture clash. Schoof unsuccessfully tried to make the agency more outward facing, including through cooperation with institutions and universities.

On 1 March 2020, Schoof succeeded Siebe Riedstra as secretary-general of the Ministry of Justice and Security, the most senior non-political position within the ministry. In his role, he was involved in negotiations on asylum reform that led to the collapse of the fourth Rutte cabinet in July 2023. Upon reaching the legal retirement age in March 2024, Schoof chose not to retire and was granted an exemption to continue working for three more years.

== Prime minister (2024–2026) ==
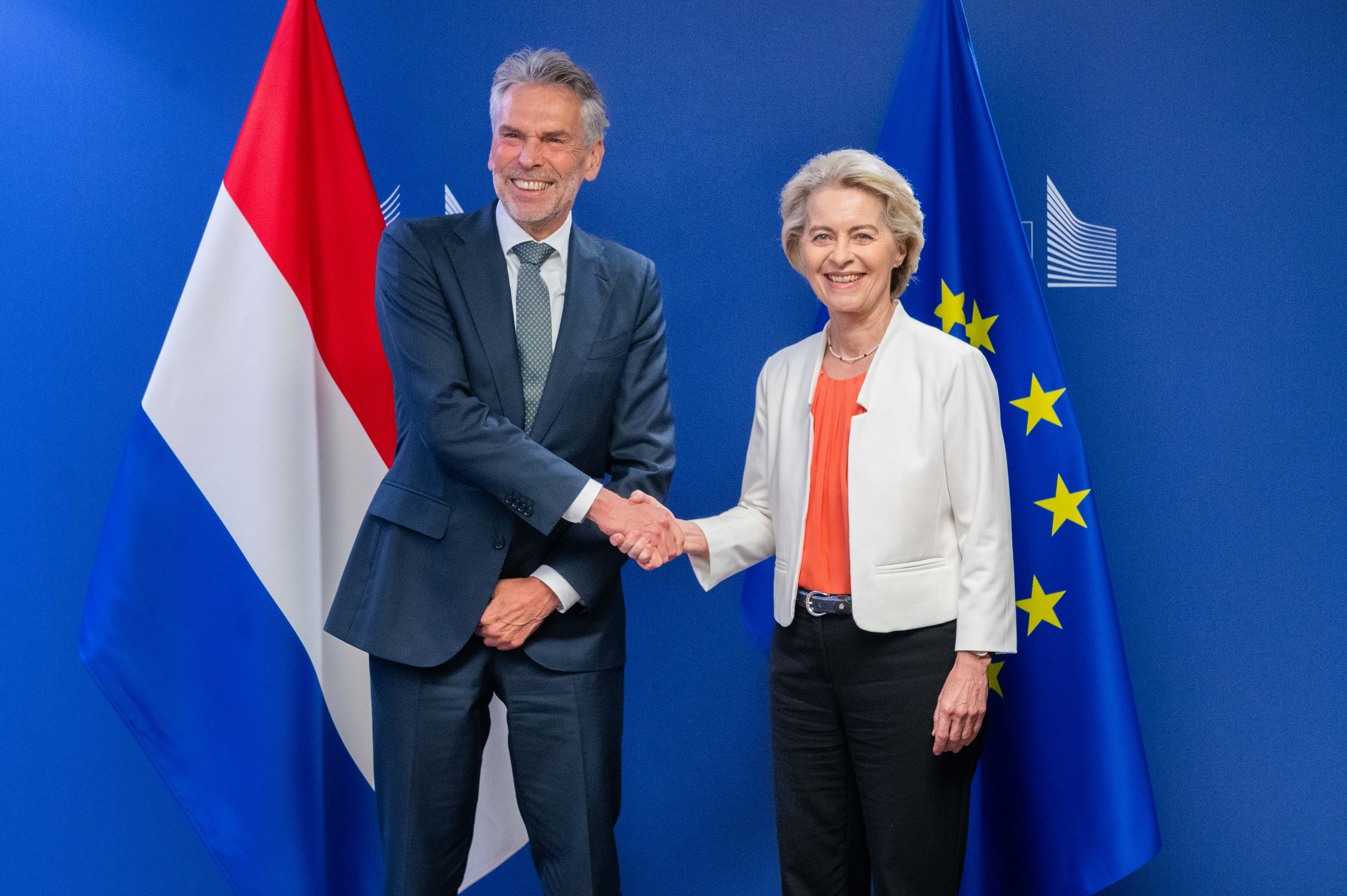
Schoof with President of the European Commission Ursula von der Leyen in 2024.

The Party for Freedom (PVV) of Geert Wilders won a plurality in the November 2023 general election. On 16 May 2024, the PVV presented a right-wing coalition agreement with the People's Party for Freedom and Democracy (VVD), New Social Contract (NSC), and the Farmer–Citizen Movement (BBB). As part of the negotiations, the four party leaders agreed none of them would serve as prime minister. The PVV had initially proposed Ronald Plasterk for the position, but he withdrew from consideration due to accusations of fraud. Schoof was subsequently nominated for the office of prime minister on 28 May 2024 by the coalition parties under formateur Richard van Zwol. He was sworn in on 2 July by King Willem-Alexander as part of the Schoof cabinet, and he became the first independent politician to serve as prime minister since Cort van der Linden (1913–1918). Dutch news weekly Elsevier Weekblad opined: "The top official knows all the nooks and crannies of The Hague and is an expert in the field of immigration and security. He believes in a healthy relationship between civil service and politics," while at all times respecting that politicians had the last say.

A debate two days later in the House of Representatives about the cabinet's government policy statement was characterised by some media outlets as chaotic. Schoof's defence against accusations of racism directed at cabinet members was described as "lame" by PVV leader Geert Wilders, and the debate was later suspended to allow Schoof to rebuke health minister Fleur Agema (PVV) for disrupting the debate through a live-tweet.

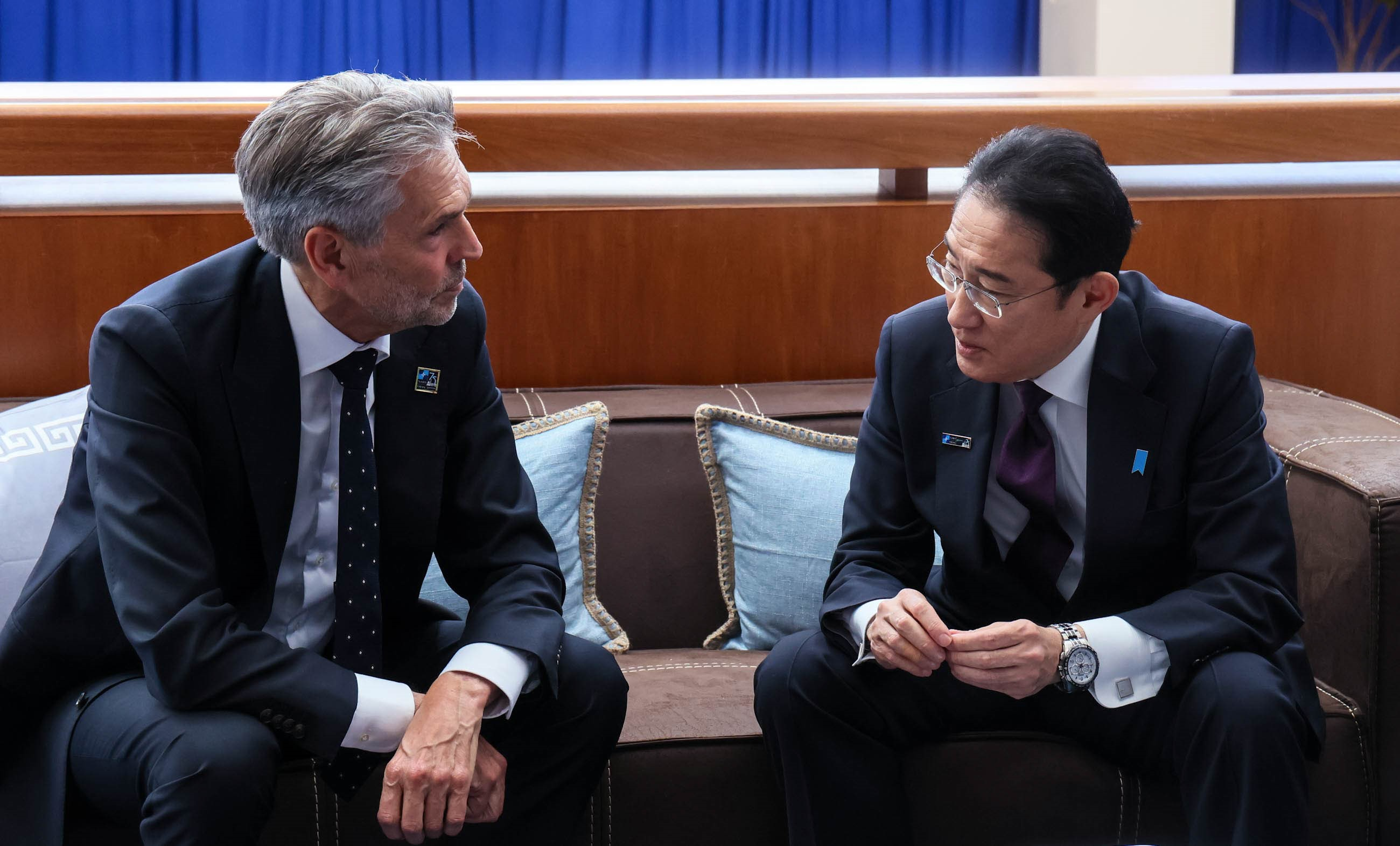
Schoof with Japanese Prime Minister Fumio Kishida in 2024.

Schoof presented the cabinet's governing agreement on 13 September 2024, expanding on the outline of the coalition agreement. It reiterated the cabinet's intention to declare an asylum crisis, bypassing initial parliamentary approval. Schoof stated that citizens were experiencing an asylum crisis but said he was unable to specify conditions or a timeline for its resolution. When documents by civil servants took the position that using emergency powers lacked legal justification, Nicolien van Vroonhoven (NSC) raised concerns, while Wilders warned that the cabinet could face trouble if an emergency law was not enacted. Schoof subsequently facilitated negotiations between the coalition parties, and an agreement on asylum measures was reached in October 2024 that excluded the use of emergency powers.

In the wake of the November 2024 Amsterdam riots, Schoof said that he was "ashamed" and "horrified by the antisemitic attacks on Israeli citizens." He called the situation "completely unacceptable", adding that "the perpetrators will be identified and prosecuted." He blamed a specific group of young people with a migration background for the attacks, and said that the events pointed to a broader integration issue. Schoof cancelled his attendance of the 2024 United Nations Climate Change Conference to monitor the Dutch government's response. On 15 November, State Secretary Nora Achahbar announced her resignation because of "polarising interactions during the past weeks." Media outlets reported on offensive, radical, and potentially racist remarks about the Amsterdam attacks during a meeting of the Council of Ministers. Schoof invited the leaders of the four coalition parties to join the cabinet for crisis talks to avert a cabinet collapse, and they finally agreed that other cabinet members of NSC would stay on. Schoof denied allegations of racism within the cabinet and coalition parties.

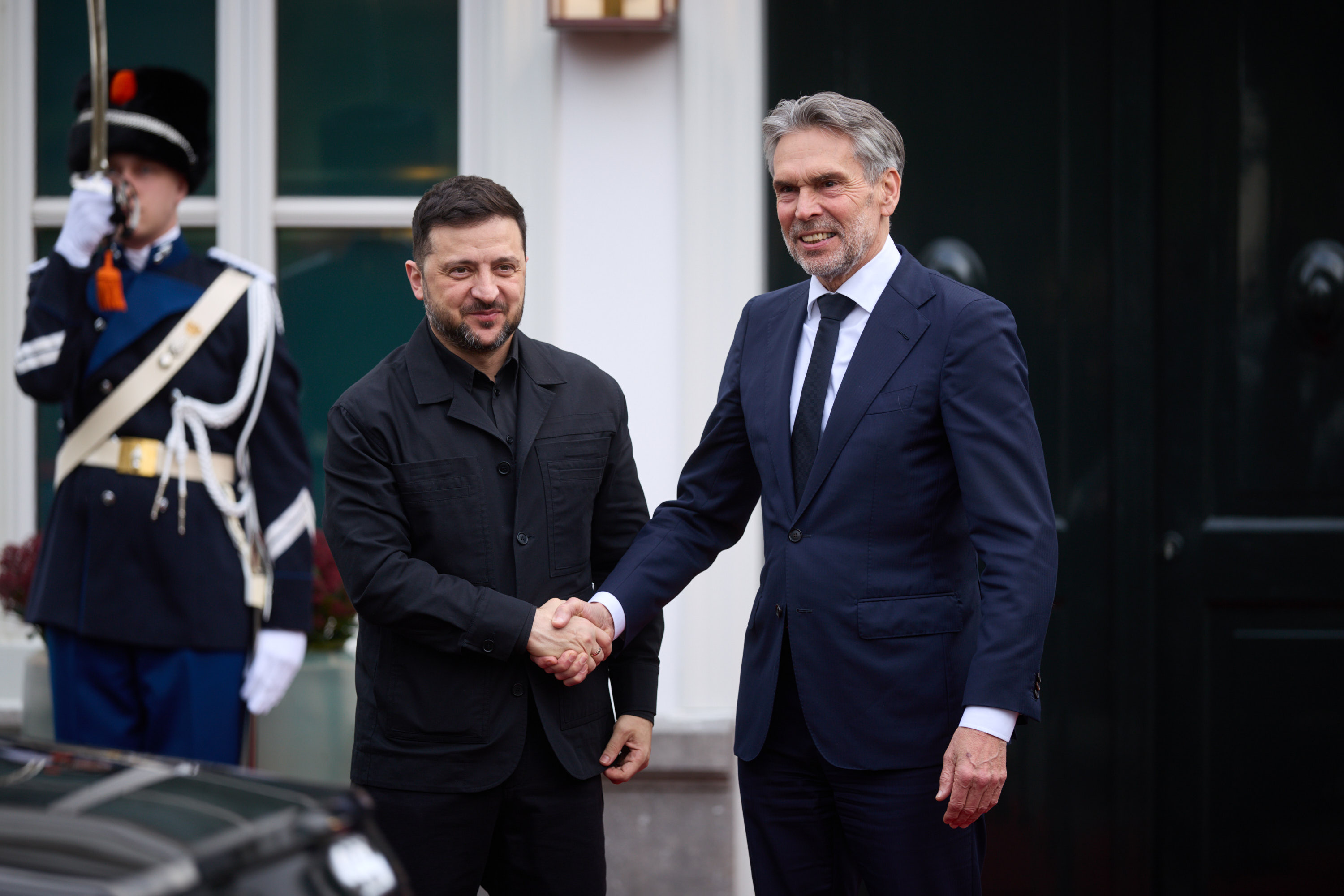
Schoof with Ukrainian President Volodymyr Zelenskyy in 2025.

Agriculture minister Femke Wiersma was tasked with drawing up measures to protect sensitive nature reserves in response to the nitrogen crisis, when the Administrative Jurisdiction Division of the Council of State ruled in December 2024 that unused nitrogen emission rights could no longer be allocated to other construction and expansion projects. Instead, a new permit would be required. Schoof subsequently established a committee comprising several cabinet members to explore measures to prevent widespread project delays.

On 3 June 2025, the PVV withdrew from Schoof's cabinet after failing to come to an agreement with coalition partners over amending the country's asylum rules, prompting Schoof's resignation as prime minister. Schoof promised to continue policy measures such as reducing the cost of living, curbing the housing crisis, investing in the Netherlands' defense, and military aid to Ukraine.

=== Role at the 2025 NATO Summit ===
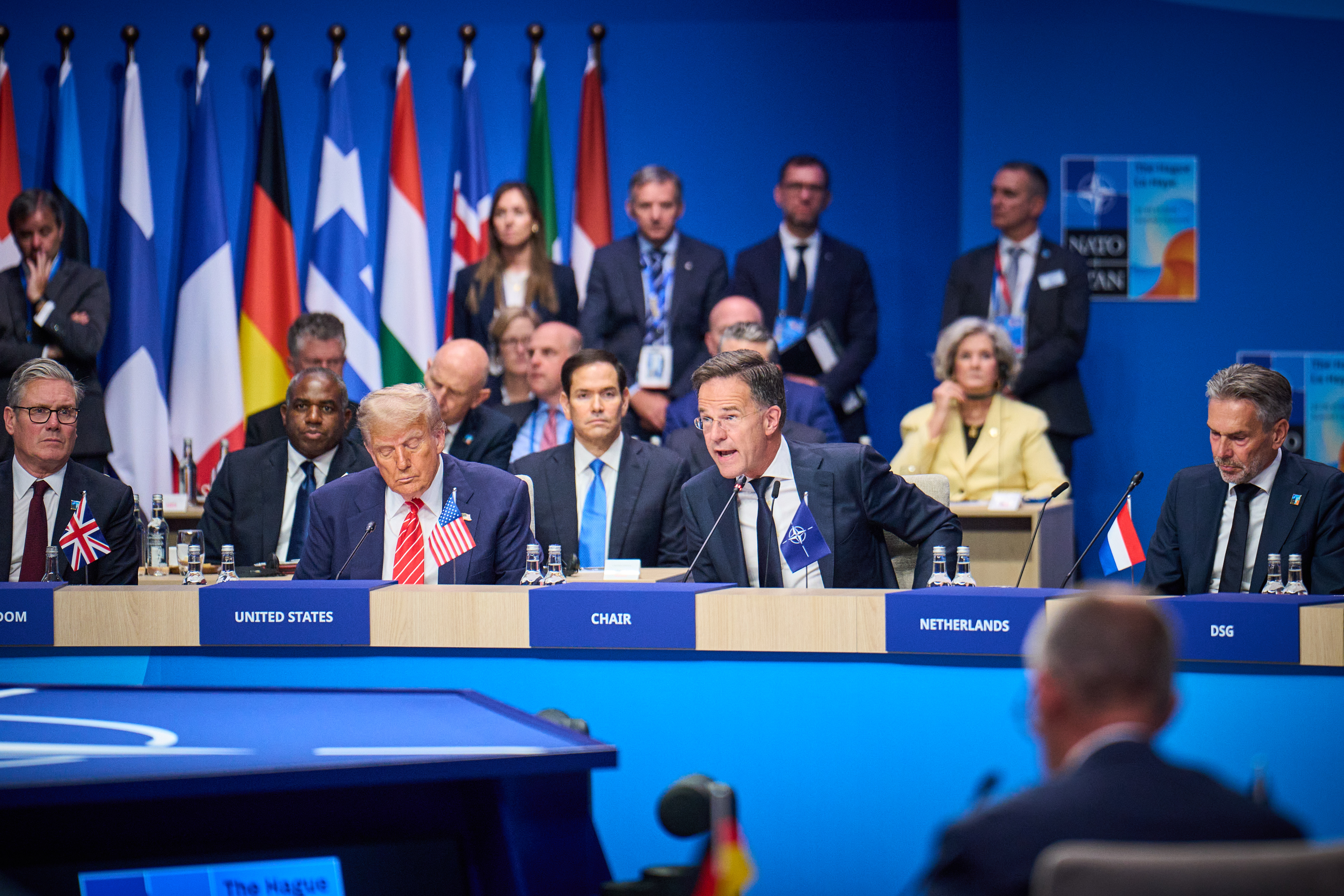
Schoof with NATO General Secretary Mark Rutte, US president Donald Trump and UK prime minister Keir Starmer at the 2025 The Hague NATO summit

As the demissionary (caretaker) Prime Minister of the Netherlands, Schoof hosted the 2025 The Hague NATO summit on 24–25 June, describing it as "historic" and a "days of top sport". He played a key role in maintaining NATO unity, particularly by engaging U.S. President Donald Trump, who praised Schoof's hosting. Schoof was present at critical meetings, including with Ukrainian President Volodymyr Zelenskyy, and announced NATO's preparation of a statement on drones and air defense for Ukraine. He expressed satisfaction with the summit's outcomes, including the adoption of a 5% GDP defense spending target by 2035, and noted a "relaxed" atmosphere among leaders.

== Political positions ==
=== As a civil servant ===
In a 2017 interview with WNL Schoof said that the Kick Out Zwarte Piet (KOZP) organisation "could potentially become extremist and therefore use violence" as an explanation as to why it had been included in the annual Dutch security service Terrorist Threat Assessment Netherlands, while also noting that KOZP did not yet use violence, and saying that this was done with similarly situated organisations on both the right and the left. After a complaint by KOZP, the group was downgraded to an activist organisation in 2019, but was categorised as a Polarisatie (polarising) group in reports for some of its methods.

In 2019, Schoof said that Salafi movements were seeking to influence Islamic schools in Amsterdam. In February 2020 he told a Dutch parliamentary commission official inquiry that the new generation of Dutch Salafi Muslims constituted a significant long-term threat to the Dutch rule of law, because "they are striving for a parallel society where the rules of the Dutch legal system do not apply." He said that one reason their motives are difficult to detect is that Dutch Salafi Muslim organisations use what he referred to as "facade politics", by espousing moderation in public, but preaching harsh extremism in private.

=== As a politician ===
Schoof was a rank and file member of the Labour Party (PvdA) for over 30 years until he left the party in early 2021, saying that he no longer felt aligned with its views. Following the PVV's general election victory in November 2023, Schoof called it a signal of distrust towards the government in an interview. He said that the public could not have been wrong about their concerns if they voted for the PVV in such large numbers.

Upon his nomination as prime minister in May 2024, Schoof promised to execute the coalition agreement. He stressed that he would act as a non-partisan politician and not join the PVV, but he said that he shared concerns about immigration, asylum and refugees, social security, farmers, and international security with the parties of his cabinet. In a later interview, Schoof stated that the coalition agreement was not something that particularly appealed to him, saying, "If something appeals to you, it also touches your heart. But it was a normal agreement, without rabid points, to which I could naturally say 'yes'."

Schoof pledged to adopt a stricter approach to immigration, stating that he viewed current asylum and migration levels as placing pressure on society, particularly on social services and cohesion. He argued that the Netherlands should adopt a more selective approach to admitting migrants to ensure a sustainable demographic balance. He suggested that labor migration rates could be adjusted to support a desired state of the economy, and he proposed assessing asylum applications based on individual circumstances rather than broad country-specific guidelines.

== Personal life ==
Schoof lives in Zoetermeer with his partner, Loes Meurs. She is a psychologist active in The Hague and a former policy advisor for the Custodial Institutions Agency. Schoof and his ex-wife, Yolanda Senf, share two daughters born in the 1990s, adopted from China. Schoof was raised Catholic but described himself a non-practising, having stopped attending church at the age of 16.

He enjoys running, and completed his first marathon in 1987 and his 18th marathon in 2024. As prime minister, Schoof completed a half marathon in Amsterdam in 1:53:00 under the alias "Peter Jansen".

== See also ==
- List of international prime ministerial trips made by Dick Schoof
- List of heads of the executive by approval rating

== Footnotes ==
Political offices
Preceded by Mark Rutte	Prime Minister of the Netherlands; 2024–2026	Succeeded by Rob Jetten
