= Fourth Rutte cabinet =

Cabinet of the Netherlands, 2022 to 2024

- Cabinet of the Netherlands

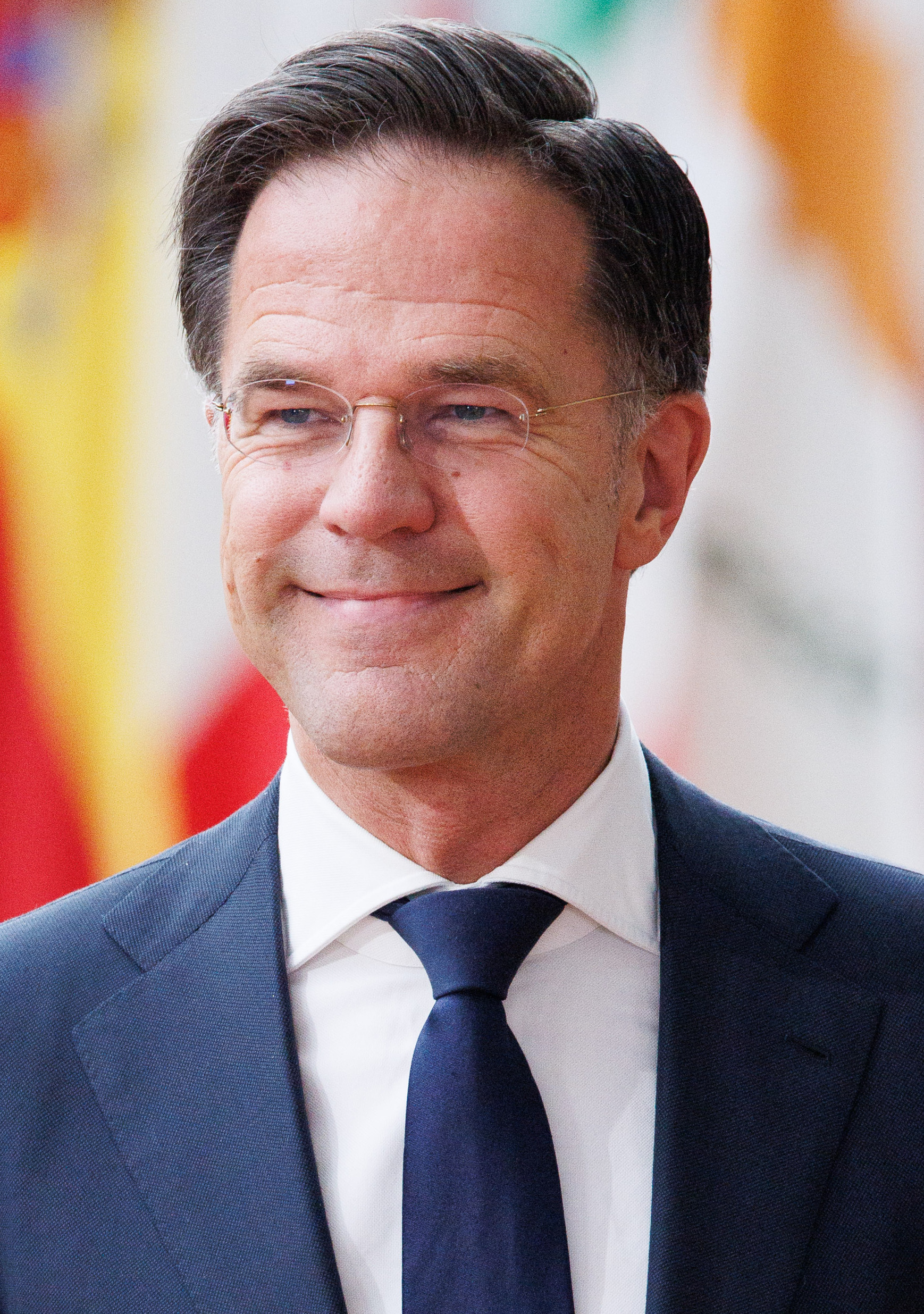
- Date formed: 10 January 2022; 2 years, 174 days in office
- Date dissolved: 2 July 2024

People and organisations
- Monarch: Willem-Alexander
- Prime Minister: Mark Rutte
- Deputy Prime Minister: Sigrid Kaag (until January 2024); Rob Jetten (from January 2024); Wopke Hoekstra (until September 2023); Karien van Gennip (from September 2023); Carola Schouten
- No. of ministers: 20
- Member party: People's Party for Freedom and Democracy (VVD); Democrats 66 (D66); Christian Democratic Appeal (CDA); Christian Union (CU)
- Status in legislature: Centre to centre-right, majority government (coalition government)

History
- Incoming formation: 2021–2022 formation
- Outgoing formation: 2023–2024 formation
- Election: 2021 election
- Outgoing election: 2023 election
- Legislature terms: 2021–2023
- Predecessor: Third Rutte cabinet
- Successor: Schoof cabinet

The fourth Rutte cabinet was the cabinet of the Netherlands from 10 January 2022 until 2 July 2024. The cabinet was a continuation of the third Rutte cabinet and was formed by the conservative liberal People's Party for Freedom and Democracy (VVD), the social liberal Democrats 66 (D66) and the Christian democratic Christian Democratic Appeal (CDA) and Christian Union (CU) after the election of 2021. The cabinet fell on 7 July 2023, after failing to reach an agreement on separate treatment of refugees fleeing from war. It continued serving as a demissionary cabinet until the Schoof cabinet was sworn in on 2 July 2024.

== Formation ==
The formation of the cabinet was particularly difficult; it required the longest time of any cabinet so far.

The formation became difficult after scout Kajsa Ollongren was photographed with notes that read "Omtzigt position elsewhere", which was controversial, for Omtzigt was one of the most popular members of parliament within his party, the Christian Democratic Appeal.

=== Coalition accord ===
The coalition accord contained, among other things, more agreements about accelerating the Netherlands' climate ambitions (55% CO_{2} reduction in 2030), changes to daycare costs, preparation for new nuclear power plants, creation of road pricing (not toll) starting in 2030, accelerated nitrogen reduction (−50% in 2030), more regulation of the rental sector, equalizing pay between grade school and high school teachers, a return of the basic scholarship for students, increase over time of legal minimum wage by 7.5% and more defense spending.

== Term ==
=== Colonial past ===
In February 2022, the cabinet offered its apologies to Indonesia for the systematic and extreme violence by Dutch soldiers during the Indonesian war of independence and the subsequent turning of a blind eye by all previous administrations. The apologies were also extended to any other groups in the Netherlands who had had to learn to live with the consequences of these decisions, such as veterans.

In December 2022, the cabinet offered their apologies for the Dutch history of slavery, in particular the trans-Atlantic slave trade, on behalf of itself and all its institutional predecessors, denouncing the slave trade as a crime against humanity. In the National Archives, the prime minister also offered the apology in Sranan Tongo, Papiamento, Dutch and English. For the first time, the cabinet recognized that the slave trade had had lasting consequences in the Netherlands, a kind of institutional racism. It proposed a fund of €200 million for measures surrounding "awareness, engagement and impact".

=== Child welfare scandal ===
Approximately 26,000 single parents were accused of fraud by the Dutch tax and customs administration, which, for some, resulted in their children being taken out of their custody, even if they had not committed fraud. This had been brewing for many years, but only gained national attention during Rutte III, and led to that government's resignation in 2021. While a special department was created to rectify this mistake, the problem has not been resolved.

This has resulted in people feeling like no real change has happened between governments as the process of rectification has ground to a standstill and there is seemingly no end in sight.

=== Governance culture ===
Mark Rutte has been in the news many times for maintaining a closed governing culture. During parliamentary hearings surrounding the welfare scandal, there was mention of a "Rutte-doctrine", a policy of keeping as much information away from the public as possible. After the fall of the cabinet, it has been characterized by CDA parliamentary leader Pieter Heerma as "irresponsibly harsh" and "bordering on reckless politics".

Some of the promises made in the coalition accord were to "improve the information provided to the House of Representatives", modernizing the archival law and to make information available to the public more quickly.

Public inquiry by the newspaper de Volkskrant led to them suing the government over a freedom of information request. During the process, it came to light that prime minister Mark Rutte had been wiping the majority of SMS text messages he received on his private phone for years, in violation of the archival legislation. His excuse was that his phone memory filled up too quickly. This was not considered a plausible excuse by members of the House.

=== Student loan system ===
The Netherlands has a long history of subsidizing students to take higher education, but a significant change to the system in 2015 (Rutte II) ended the basic scholarship (basisbeurs), introducing instead a borrowing system; this was projected to save the government a billion euro per year.

Rutte IV reintroduced the basic scholarship, stating that the high student debts reduce quality of life, make students more hesitant to pursue higher education and reduce the chance for equal opportunities. There were also additional compensation for students who studied under the borrowing framework.

=== Natural gas extraction and earthquakes ===
The Netherlands has a history of extracting gas from natural gas fields and does not experience natural destructive earthquakes according to the Royal Netherlands Meteorological Institute, however, the extraction of natural gas above the Groningen gas field has caused several man-made earthquakes which severely damaged people's properties. The damage to the locals and concerns around climate change have been an ongoing concern and led to a parliamentary audit on the government's decisions surrounding the Groningen gas field, the largest natural gas field in Europe.

Earthquakes caused by gas extraction have been noted elsewhere in the Netherlands as well. Earthquakes due to gas extraction have been happening since 1986, but have only grown more severe since the 2000s.

The gas extraction in Groningen has been scaling down since 2018, and was planned to stop in October 2023. Eventually the definitive closing of the gas field was signed on 17 April 2024. This was a point of contention given the Russian invasion of Ukraine and the subsequent European ban on gas imports from Russia.

During the Rutte IV cabinet, compensation was awarded to homeowners whose houses were damaged by gas extraction, but this process has generally not gone smoothly.

On 24 February 2023, a parliamentary inquiry commission determined the government owed a ereschuld("debt of honour") to residents of Groningen and proposed several remedies to alleviate this.

=== Nitrogen crisis ===
The government of the Netherlands is experiencing a crisis of ecology and of governance through the mishandling of the European measures on nitrogen that were agreed upon as early as 1991 with the agreement of the Habitats Directive. It has been recognized as a serious issue since 2019.

Nitrogen emissions are caused by a variety of essential economic activities such as construction, farming, transport and industry, but there is a science-informed and court-enforced target that the Netherlands would have to reduce nitrogen emissions in certain areas by up to 50% compared to 2019 by 2023. This has created political unrest among the industries affected, most visibly farmers, who protested and flew Dutch flags upside down and founded a new political party, the Farmer–Citizen Movement (BBB), just after the report from 2019.

Since the cabinet took charge in January 2022, courts have ruled that the policy surrounding construction was not consistent with, or insufficient to comply with, nitrogen legislation and thousands of construction projects had to be halted or cancelled to comply with nitrogen legislation.

The cabinet has attempted to negotiate an agreeable settlement with both small and large agrarians, but all attempts at negotiation eventually broke down. The strong incentive to negotiate is in part due to the large political gains of BBB in the 2023 provincial elections. The cabinet changed its position several times, sometimes telling different things to different parties, leading to more tension and uncertainty.

=== Energy and inflation ===
Rising energy prices and high inflation impacted the economy of the Netherlands during the term of the government, mainly due to the COVID-19 pandemic, the Russian invasion of Ukraine and subsequent ban on fuel imports from Russia, and greedflation. The rise in energy prices prompted the government to introduce a price ceiling on energy, paying the difference on behalf of the citizens.

=== Housing shortage ===
The Netherlands has had a severe housing shortage for some time for a variety of reasons. This shortage grew significantly during the term of the cabinet from ~300,000 to about 400,000 houses.

=== Asylum policy ===
Immigration and asylum policy has been an important political topic in the Netherlands for many years. The government has generally been unwilling to create permanent capacity for asylum seekers, choosing to instead scale capacity up or down as required, creating issues for municipalities.

In recent years, the Netherlands has received asylum seekers from Syria fleeing the Syrian civil war and from Ukraine fleeing the Russian invasion of Ukraine. Asylum applications have increased by ~33% since 2022 to over 47,000, and, according to government estimates, are expected to reach 70,000 by the end of 2023. This has exceeded the number of refugees the country was prepared for. According to the United Nations High Commissioner for Refugees, this was because capacity to house asylum seekers was scaled down after the "Turkey deal".

In 2022, through the introduction of the Dispersal Act, the government chose to devolve responsibility for taking on an assigned number of asylum seekers to the municipalities, which would receive the responsibility to house and integrate a number of asylum seekers from the COA (central organ for housing asylum seekers). Municipalities were generally found either unwilling or unable to place asylum seeker housing centers (AZCs), in part due to concerns of locals such as "there are too many people" or "why can't it be somewhere else?".

The scaling down of housing for asylum seekers, a general housing shortage and the inability to create more housing has resulted in bad living conditions in the Ter Apel application centre, which resulted in the International Red Cross deeming it necessary to lend aid, as conditions were considered "inhuman and unsustainable".

The Raad voor het Openbaar Bestuur (Council for Public Governance) and the Adviesraad Migratie (Immigration Advice Council) judged the crisis to be "a crisis created and maintained by the government itself".

In February 2023, the CDA proposed to institute a two-status system. This proposal was supported by the VVD but opposed by the CU and D66.

The proposal would have classified war refugees under a different status than other refugees. It would limit the total number of relatives who could be reunited with refugees to 200 per month, force families to wait for two years before being allowed to reunite and reduce the maximum term of residence to three years compared to the regular seven.

Disagreement about this proposal led to the government's resignation three months later, as the CU and D66 could not abide by the terms demanded by the VVD. This was a premeditated strategy, rather than chance, according to the Christian Union and opposition parties.

== Demissionary ==
The cabinet fell on Friday 7 July 2023, after failing to reach an agreement on the separate treatment of refugees fleeing from war. As a result, the cabinet became demissionary. Mark Rutte offered the resignation of the cabinet to the King on Saturday, 8 July. He announced his departure from politics altogether on Monday 10 July, bringing an end to more than thirteen years of his leadership of his party, the People's Party for Freedom and Democracy. Many opposition parties are hoping this signals the end of Rutte's style of politics in the Netherlands, which has been characterized as neoliberal and closed off from outsiders. Following Rutte's resignation, Wopke Hoekstra of the CDA also indicated he would not be available as party leader for the next election. Sigrid Kaag of D66 also announced her departure from politics; her reason for this was that death threats she had received had had a heavy negative impact on her and her family. Kaag was threatened at her home with torches earlier in the year.

The government becoming demissionary has consequences for a variety of measures that were meant to alleviate the current issues in the Netherlands. Any policy considered "controversial" will not be acted on and will be left to be decided by the upcoming election. This has resulted in a failure to reach new labour accords with the trade unions for higher wages and improved working conditions despite record profits for corporations; a failure to reach an accord with the agricultural sector, creating more uncertainty for farmers and uncertainty of attaining the nitrogen targets; and prolonging the housing shortage. Nevertheless, the NRC reported the demissionary status of the cabinet had a more limited impact compared to the past with several ministers introducing new legislative proposals. By March 2024, 61 subjects had been declared controversial compared to 300–400 in the two preceding demissionary periods.

A general election was held on 22 November 2023 in accordance with the Dutch Electoral Act mandating a prompt vote. In the months following the election, three cabinet members of D66 stepped down to pursue other opportunities: State Secretary for Culture and Media Gunay Uslu became CEO of Corendon, Minister of Finance Sigrid Kaag returned to diplomacy at the United Nations, and Minister of Health, Welfare and Sport Ernst Kuipers left for an unspecified international job. Former state secretary Steven van Weyenberg succeeded Uslu, but he was picked a month later to fill the Minister of Finance vacancy. Fleur Gräper subsequently became the new State Secretary for Culture and Media. Kaag's second position of Deputy Prime Minister was taken over by Rob Jetten. Rutte called the departures unfortunate but individually explainable and said he was not concerned. Minister for Foreign Trade and Development Cooperation Liesje Schreinemacher became the first minister in Dutch history to go on maternity leave in December 2023, and she was temporarily replaced by Geoffrey van Leeuwen.

The fourth Rutte cabinet was dissolved upon the swearing in of the Schoof cabinet on 2 July 2024.

== Cabinet members ==
Prime minister and deputy prime ministers in the fourth Rutte cabinet
Title	Minister			Term of office	
Title	Image	Name	Party	Start	End
Prime Minister	Mark Rutte	Mark Rutte	VVD	14 October 2010 (Note: Retained this position from the previous cabinet.)	2 July 2024
First Deputy Prime Minister	Sigrid Kaag	Sigrid Kaag	D66	10 January 2022	8 January 2024 (Note: Resigned from this position.)
First Deputy Prime Minister	Rob Jetten	Rob Jetten	D66	8 January 2024	2 July 2024
Second Deputy Prime Minister	Wopke Hoekstra	Wopke Hoekstra	CDA	10 January 2022	1 September 2023
Second Deputy Prime Minister	Karien van Gennip	Karien van Gennip	CDA	5 September 2023	2 July 2024
Third Deputy Prime Minister	Carola Schouten	Carola Schouten	CU	26 October 2017	2 July 2024

Ministers in the fourth Rutte cabinet
Title	Minister			Term of office	
Title	Image	Name	Party	Start	End
Minister of General Affairs	Mark Rutte	Mark Rutte	VVD	14 October 2010	2 July 2024
Minister of Finance	Sigrid Kaag	Sigrid Kaag	D66	10 January 2022	8 January 2024
Minister of Finance	Rob Jetten	Rob Jetten (Note: Tasks were de facto delegated to the State Secretary for Tax Affairs and the Tax Administration.) (ad interim)	D66	8 January 2024	12 January 2024
Minister of Finance	Steven van Weyenberg	Steven van Weyenberg	D66	12 January 2024	2 July 2024
Minister of Foreign Affairs	Wopke Hoekstra	Wopke Hoekstra	CDA	10 January 2022	1 September 2023
Minister of Foreign Affairs	Liesje Schreinemacher	Liesje Schreinemacher (ad interim)	VVD	1 September 2023	5 September 2023
Minister of Foreign Affairs	Hanke Bruins Slot	Hanke Bruins Slot	CDA	5 September 2023	2 July 2024
Minister of Justice and Security	Dilan Yeşilgöz	Dilan Yeşilgöz	VVD	10 January 2022	2 July 2024
Minister of the Interior and Kingdom Relations	Hanke Bruins Slot	Hanke Bruins Slot	CDA	10 January 2022	5 September 2023 (Note: Appointed as Minister of Foreign Affairs.)
Minister of the Interior and Kingdom Relations	Hugo de Jonge	Hugo de Jonge	CDA	5 September 2023	2 July 2024
Minister of Education, Culture and Science	Robbert Dijkgraaf	Robbert Dijkgraaf	D66	10 January 2022	2 July 2024
Minister of Defence	Kajsa Ollongren	Kajsa Ollongren	D66	10 January 2022	2 July 2024
Minister of Infrastructure and Water Management	Mark Harbers	Mark Harbers	VVD	10 January 2022	2 July 2024
Minister of Economic Affairs and Climate Policy	Micky Adriaansens	Micky Adriaansens	VVD	10 January 2022	2 July 2024
Minister of Agriculture, Nature and Food Quality	Henk Staghouwer	Henk Staghouwer	CU	10 January 2022	5 September 2022
Minister of Agriculture, Nature and Food Quality	Carola Schouten	Carola Schouten (ad interim)	CU	5 September 2022	4 October 2022
Minister of Agriculture, Nature and Food Quality	Piet Adema	Piet Adema	CU	4 October 2022	2 July 2024
Minister of Social Affairs and Employment	Karien van Gennip	Karien van Gennip	CDA	10 January 2022	2 July 2024
Minister of Health, Welfare and Sport	Ernst Kuipers	Ernst Kuipers	D66	10 January 2022	10 January 2024
Minister of Health, Welfare and Sport	Conny Helder	Conny Helder	VVD	10 January 2024	2 July 2024

Ministers without portfolio in the fourth Rutte cabinet
Ministry	Portfolio	Minister			Term of office	
Ministry	Portfolio	Image	Name	Party	Start	End
Social Affairs and Employment	Poverty Policy, Participation and Pensions	Carola Schouten	Carola Schouten	CU	10 January 2022	2 July 2024
Foreign Affairs	Foreign Trade and Development Cooperation	Liesje Schreinemacher	Liesje Schreinemacher	VVD	10 January 2022	4 December 2023 (Note: Took maternity leave.)
Foreign Affairs	Foreign Trade and Development Cooperation	Geoffrey van Leeuwen	Geoffrey van Leeuwen (acting)	VVD	4 December 2023	15 April 2024
Foreign Affairs	Foreign Trade and Development Cooperation	Liesje Schreinemacher	Liesje Schreinemacher	VVD	15 April 2024	2 July 2024
Justice and Security	Legal Protection	Franc Weerwind	Franc Weerwind	D66	10 January 2022	2 July 2024
Interior and Kingdom Relations	Housing and Spatial Planning	Hugo de Jonge	Hugo de Jonge	CDA	10 January 2022	5 September 2023 (Note: Appointed as Minister of the Interior and Kingdom Relations.)
Education, Culture and Science	Primary and Secondary Education	Dennis Wiersma	Dennis Wiersma	VVD	10 January 2022	22 June 2023
Education, Culture and Science	Primary and Secondary Education	Mariëlle Paul	Mariëlle Paul	VVD	21 July 2023	2 July 2024
Economic Affairs and Climate Policy	Climate and Energy Policy	Rob Jetten	Rob Jetten	D66	10 January 2022	2 July 2024
Agriculture, Nature and Food Quality	Nature and Nitrogen Policy	Christianne van der Wal	Christianne van der Wal	VVD	10 January 2022	2 July 2024
Health, Welfare and Sport	Long-term Care and Sport	Conny Helder	Conny Helder	VVD	10 January 2022	10 January 2024 (Note: Appointed as Minister of Health, Welfare and Sport.)
Health, Welfare and Sport	Medical Care	Pia Dijkstra	Pia Dijkstra	D66	2 February 2024	2 July 2024

State secretaries in the fourth Rutte cabinet
Ministry	Portfolio	State secretary			Term of office	
Ministry	Portfolio	Image	Name	Party	Start	End
Justice and Security	Asylum and Migration	Eric van der Burg	Eric van der Burg	VVD	10 January 2022	28 October 2023 (Note: Took an extended medical leave of absence.)
Justice and Security	Asylum and Migration	Christophe van der Maat	Christophe van der Maat (acting)	VVD	30 October 2022	24 November 2023
Justice and Security	Asylum and Migration	Eric van der Burg	Eric van der Burg	VVD	24 November 2023	2 July 2024
Interior and Kingdom Relations	Kingdom Relations and Digitalisation	Alexandra van Huffelen	Alexandra van Huffelen	D66	10 January 2022	2 July 2024
Education, Culture and Science	Culture and Media	Gunay Uslu	Gunay Uslu	D66	10 January 2022	1 December 2023
Education, Culture and Science	Culture and Media	Steven van Weyenberg	Steven van Weyenberg	D66	6 December 2023	12 January 2024 (Note: Appointed as Minister of Finance.)
Education, Culture and Science	Culture and Media	Fleur Gräper	Fleur Gräper	D66	12 December 2024	2 July 2024
Finance	Tax Affairs and the Tax Administration	Marinx van Rij	Marnix van Rij	CDA	10 January 2022	2 July 2024
Finance	Benefits and Customs	Aukje de Vries	Aukje de Vries	VVD	10 January 2022	2 July 2024
Defence	Arms Procurement and Personnel	Christophe van der Maat	Christophe van der Maat	VVD	10 January 2022	30 October 2022 (Note: Appointed as acting State Secretary for Justice and Security.)
Defence	Arms Procurement and Personnel	Christophe van der Maat	Christophe van der Maat	VVD	24 November 2023	2 July 2024
Infrastructure and Water Management	Environment and Public Transport	Vivianne Heijnen	Vivianne Heijnen	CDA	10 January 2022	24 May 2024
Economic Affairs and Climate Policy	Extractive Industries	Hans Vijlbrief	Hans Vijlbrief	D66	10 January 2022	2 July 2024
Health, Welfare and Sport	Youth and Prevention	Maarten van Ooijen	Maarten van Ooijen	CU	10 January 2022	2 July 2024
