= Fleur Gräper =

Dutch politician (born 1974)

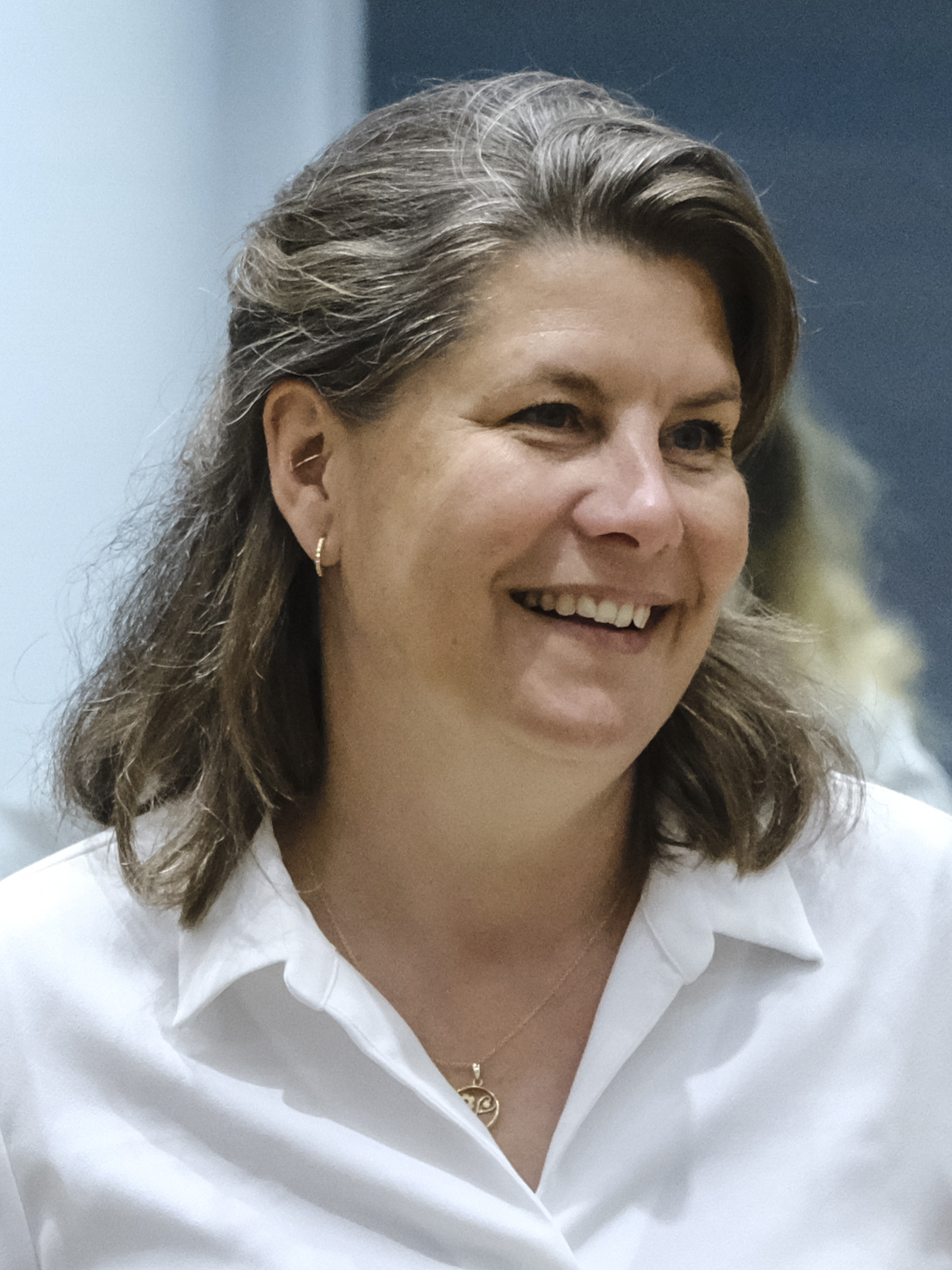
- Gräper in 2024

Mayor of Tilburg
- Incumbent
- Assumed office 21 January 2026
- Preceded by: Theo Weterings

State Secretary for Culture and Media
- In office 12 January 2024 – 2 July 2024
- Prime Minister: Mark Rutte
- Preceded by: Steven van Weyenberg
- Succeeded by: Position dissolved

Member of the Provincial Executive of Groningen
- In office 2015–2023

Chairperson of Democrats 66
- In office 2013–2015
- Preceded by: Ingrid van Engelshoven
- Succeeded by: Letty Demmers

Personal details
- Born: Fleur Quirine van Koolwijk; 23 December 1974 (age 51) Leiden, Netherlands
- Party: Democrats 66
- Spouse: Floris Gräper (m. 1999)
- Children: 2

Fleur Quirine Gräper-van Koolwijk (born 23 December 1974) is a Dutch politician of the Democrats 66 (D66), who served as State Secretary for Culture and Media from January 2024 until July 2024.

== Biography ==
Gräper was born in 1974 in Leiden, and she studied history. She served on the Provincial Council of Groningen, including as parliamentary leader, and she first ran for the House of Representatives in the 2010 general election as D66's eighteenth candidate. She was not elected. Gräper became the party's chairperson in 2013, and she stepped down in 2015 to join the Provincial Executive of Groningen. As a member of the latter, she was involved in debates over the southern part of Groningen's ring road. Gräper left the provincial executive in July 2023.

She was appointed State Secretary for Culture and Media on 12 January 2024 as part of the demissionary fourth Rutte cabinet. Gunay Uslu had resigned in December 2023 to become CEO of Corendon and had been succeeded by Steven van Weyenberg. However, Van Weyenberg switched to the position of Minister of Finance the following month, leaving the state secretarial vacancy for Gräper to fill. Her term as state secretary ended on 2 July 2024, when the Schoof cabinet was sworn in.

She became mayor of Tilburg on 21 January 2026.

== Personal life ==
Gräper is married and has two children.

== Electoral history ==
Electoral history of Fleur Gräper
Year	Body	Party	Pos.	Votes	Result		Ref.
Year	Body	Party	Pos.	Votes	Party seats	Individual	Ref.
2010	House of Representatives	Democrats 66	18	3,560	10	Lost	
2021	House of Representatives	Democrats 66	74 (Note: Gräper participated as a lijstduwer of her party in electoral district 1 (Groningen).)	300	24	Lost	
2023	House of Representatives	Democrats 66	71 (Note: Gräper participated as a lijstduwer of her party.)	429	9	Lost	
2025	House of Representatives	Democrats 66	46	1,692	26	Lost	

== Notes ==
Political offices
Preceded by Steven van Weyenberg	State Secretary for Culture and Media; 2024	Office dissolved
