= Koen Becking =

Dutch politician and academic administrator (born 1969)

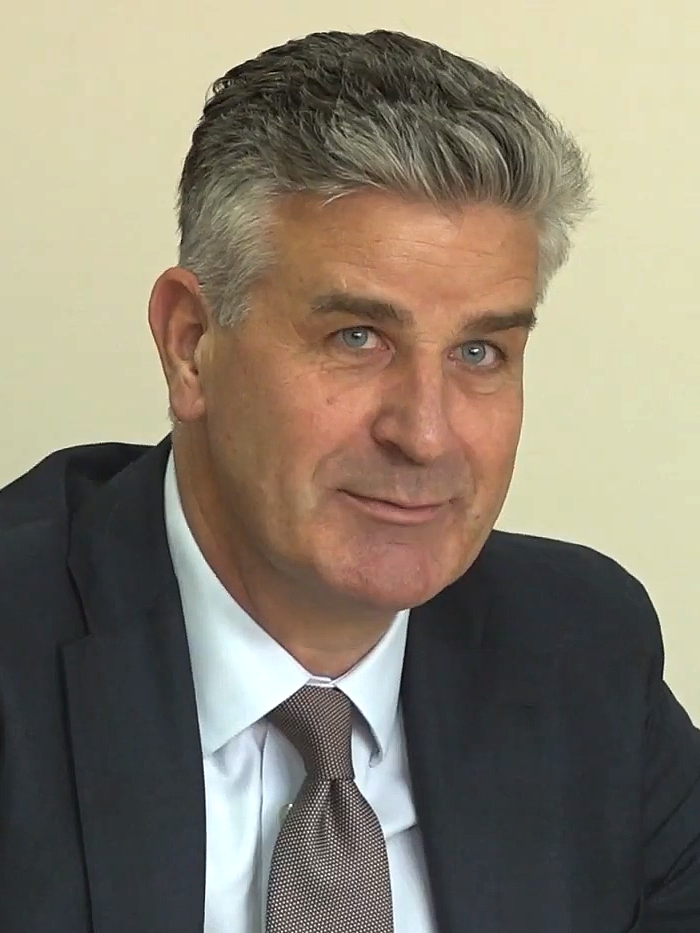
- Becking in 2025

State Secretary for Primary and Secondary Education and Equal Opportunities
- In office 5 September 2025 – 22 February 2026
- Minister: Gouke Moes
- Cabinet: Schoof
- Preceded by: Mariëlle Paul

Personal details
- Born: Koen Martijn Becking; 3 November 1969 (age 56) Alphen aan den Rijn
- Party: People's Party for Freedom and Democracy
- Children: 3
- Education: University of Amsterdam; Utrecht University
- Occupation: Politician; academic administrator

Koen Martijn Becking (Dutch: [ˈkum ˈbɛkɪŋ]; born 3 November 1969) is a Dutch academic administrator and politician of the conservative-liberal People's Party for Freedom and Democracy (VVD), who served as the state secretary for primary and secondary education and equal opportunities between September 2025 and February 2026.

== Early life and career ==
Becking was born in 1969 in Alphen aan den Rijn, and he attended the secondary school CSG Jan Arentsz. He studied political science at the University of Amsterdam between 1988 and 1992 and public administration at the Netherlands School of Public Administration between 1997 and 1999. In 2001, he obtained his doctorate at Utrecht University with a specialisation in employment conditions and co-determination in Dutch and European governments. He served as president of the executive board of Tilburg University from October 2012 until October 2020, when Becking became rector of Nyenrode Business University. He left the latter role at the end of this term in September 2024.

On 5 September 2025, he joined the demissionary Schoof cabinet as state secretary for primary and secondary education and equal opportunities, succeeding Mariëlle Paul who became social affairs minister.

== Personal life ==
As of 2025, Becking was married, and he had three children. He was Prince Carnival of 's-Hertogenbosch until 2024.

Political offices
Preceded by Mariëlle Paul	State Secretary for Primary and Secondary Education and Equal Opportunities; 2025–2026
