= Mariëlle Paul =

Dutch politician (born 1966)

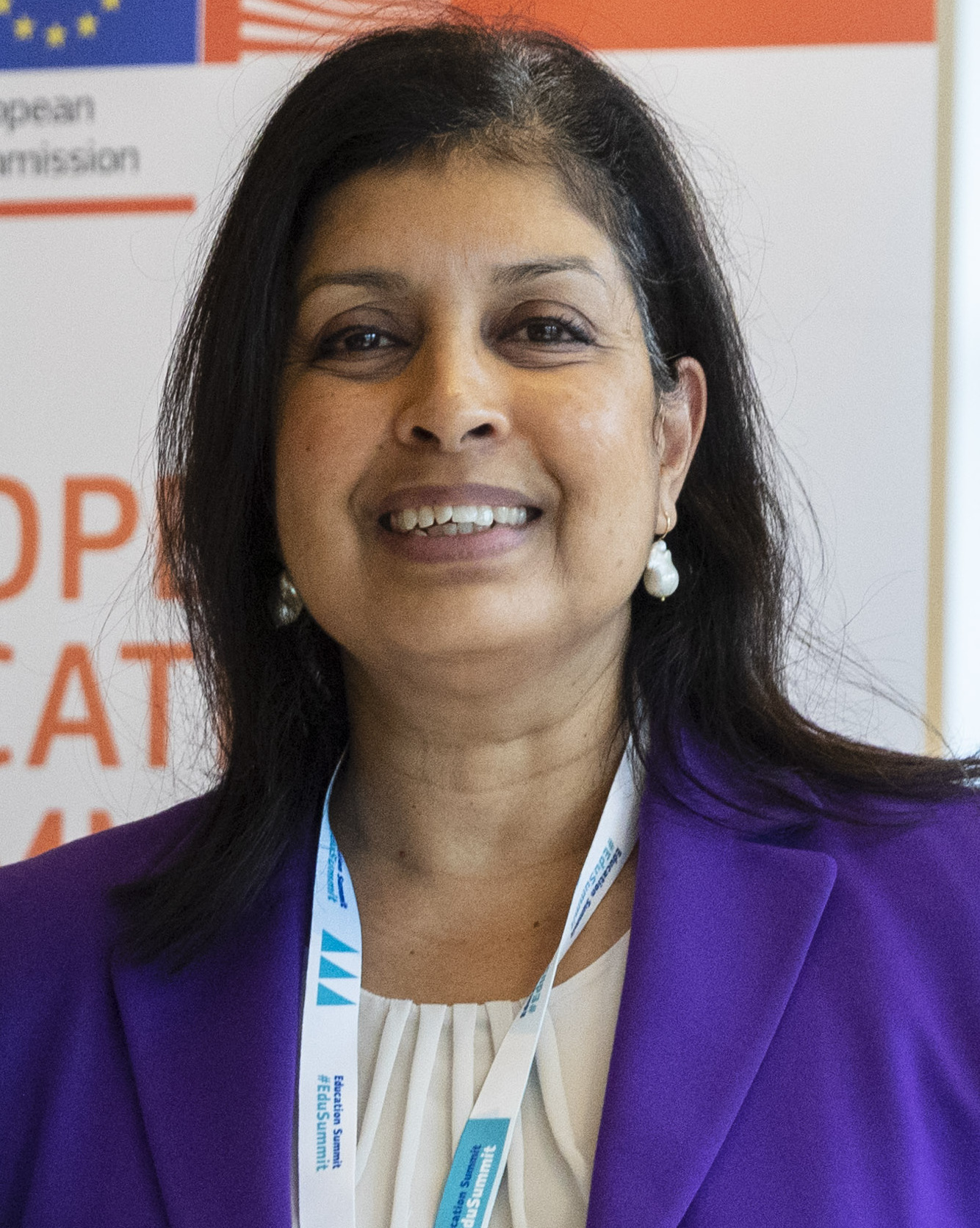
- Paul in 2023

Minister of Social Affairs and Employment
- In office 5 September 2025 – 23 February 2026
- Prime Minister: Dick Schoof
- Preceded by: Eddy van Hijum
- Succeeded by: Hans Vijlbrief

State Secretary for Primary and Secondary Education and Emancipation
- In office 2 July 2024 – 5 September 2025
- Prime Minister: Dick Schoof
- Minister: Eppo Bruins
- Preceded by: Herself (as Minister for Primary and Secondary Education)
- Succeeded by: Koen Becking

Minister for Primary and Secondary Education
- In office 21 July 2023 – 2 July 2024
- Prime Minister: Mark Rutte
- Preceded by: Dennis Wiersma
- Succeeded by: Herself (as State Secretary for Primary and Secondary Education and Emancipation)

Member of the House of Representatives
- In office 6 December 2023 – 2 July 2024
- Succeeded by: Rosemarijn Dral
- In office 31 March 2021 – 21 July 2023
- Succeeded by: Simone Richardson

Personal details
- Born: 5 November 1966 (age 59) Geldrop, Netherlands
- Party: People's Party for Freedom and Democracy (VVD)
- Education: Leiden University
- Occupation: Politician; communications director

Mariëlle Lucienne Josepha Paul (born 5 November 1966) is a Dutch politician. A member of the conservative liberal People's Party for Freedom and Democracy (VVD), she was elected to the House of Representatives in the 2021 general election, and she became Minister for Primary and Secondary Education as part of the fourth Rutte cabinet in July 2023. She continued with the same portfolio in the Schoof cabinet as State Secretary for Primary and Secondary Education and Equal Opportunities between July 2024 and September 2025. She served as Minister of Social Affairs and Employment between September 2025 and February 2026. Paul previously worked as a communications director for several multinational corporations.

== Early life and corporate career ==
Paul was born in 1966 in the North Brabant town of Geldrop to Pakistani parents. Her father was Anglo-Indian, and her parents had moved from Karachi to the Netherlands the year before Paul's birth, when her father – a mechanical engineer – took a job at DAF. Paul grew up with a sister and moved from Geldrop to the nearby village of Heeze in 1973. She played the piano and attended the secondary school Augustinianum at gymnasium level starting in 1979. She studied international law at Leiden University in the years 1985–91 and was a member of the student association Minerva.

After graduating, Paul started working for oil and gas company BP. She became a corporate communications director at public relations company Hill & Knowlton six years later. Between 2000 and 2004, she co-owned a Haarlem communication consultancy called Principal Communications, and Paul subsequently started working for the bank ABN AMRO. She was employed there for almost nine years and filled positions in marketing, communication, and HR. Paul became corporate and sales communications director at media group Sanoma in 2013. She left that company in 2015 and worked for the NGO Porticus as its interim communications director. Paul was Royal BAM Group's communications director between 2017 and her election to the House of Representatives in 2021.

== House of Representatives ==
In the 2021 general election, she was placed 17th on the VVD's party list. Paul had served as member and vice chair of the board of the Amsterdam VVD between 2017 and 2021. Her party won 34 seats, causing her to be elected. Paul received 2,633 preference votes and was sworn into the House of Representatives on 31 March 2021. She became her party's spokesperson for international trade, development aid, and macroeconomic policy, but her portfolio changed to primary and secondary education shortly after. Compensation for victims of the childcare benefits scandal was added later as well. Besides, Paul is part of the contact groups Germany, United Kingdom, and United States, and she is on the Committees for Education, Culture and Science; for European Affairs; for Finance; for Foreign Affairs; for Kingdom Relations (chair); and for Public Expenditure. She was one of her party's lijstduwers in Amsterdam in the 2022 municipal elections.

When Khadija Arib left the House in late 2022, Paul took over as chair of a committee to pepare a parliamentary inquiry into the COVID-19 pandemic in the Netherlands in an acting capacity. Newspaper NRC reported in February 2023 that some members of the committee had demanded the departure of fellow members Pepijn van Houwelingen (FVD) Wybren van Haga (BVNL) for promoting prejudiced views. The following week, Paul – who did not have the authority to remove members – announced that the committee would continue its work following constructive talks. After preparations were finished in June 2023, the parliamentary inquiry was indefinitely postponed, as not enough parties had nominated a member of parliament to take part. Paul had already indicated she would not be available to lead the inquiry.

== Rutte and Schoof cabinets ==
On 18 July 2023, it was announced Paul would become Minister for Primary and Secondary Education as part of the fourth Rutte cabinet. Her predecessor, Dennis Wiersma, had resigned the month before following reports of unacceptable behavior in the workplace. The cabinet had collapsed on 7 July due to disagreements over asylum reform and continued as a caretaker government. Paul was sworn in by King Willem-Alexander at palace Huis ten Bosch on 21 July. Her appointment marked the first time in Dutch political history that the cabinet consisted of more women than men. Serving alongside Minister of Education, Culture and Science Robbert Dijkgraaf, who leads the ministry, Paul's responsibilities were preschooling, primary and secondary education, special education, adult education, informal education, action plan basic skills, equal opportunities, teacher policy, civilian service, National Program Education, education real estate, DUO, and Inspectorate of Education.

After the PVV, VVD, NSC, and BBB formed the Schoof cabinet, Paul was sworn in as State Secretary for Primary and Secondary Education and Equal Opportunities on 2 July 2024. Her portfolio was nearly unchanged. The coalition agreement included plans to refocus primary education on reading, writing, and arithmetic and to significantly reduce the number of core learning objectives. After a new set of more specific objectives was presented following years of discussions, the cabinet postponed their implementation to make a stricter selection. Paul continued work on a bill of her predecessor to broaden the scope of the Inspectorate of Education to include informal education in order to take action against lessons that incite hatred, discrimination, or violence.

In a cabinet reshuffle, Paul succeeded Eddy van Hijum as Minister of Social Affairs and Employment on 5 September 2025.

== Personal life ==
Paul is a resident of Amsterdam, where she had been living for thirty years at the time of her swearing in as MP. She is single.

== Electoral history ==
Electoral history of Mariëlle Paul
Year	Body	Party	Pos.	Votes	Result		Ref.
Year	Body	Party	Pos.	Votes	Party seats	Individual	Ref.
2021	House of Representatives	People's Party for Freedom and Democracy	17	2,633	34 / 150	Won	
2023	House of Representatives	People's Party for Freedom and Democracy	10	2,704	24 / 150	Won	
2026	Amsterdam Municipal Council	People's Party for Freedom and Democracy	49 (Note: Paul participated as lijstduwer.)	157	6 / 45	Lost	

== Notes ==
Political offices
Preceded by Dennis Wiersma	Minister for Primary and Secondary Education; 2023–2024	Succeeded by Herself as State Secretary for Primary and Secondary Education and Emancipation
Preceded by Herself as Minister for Primary and Secondary Education	State Secretary for Primary and Secondary Education and Emancipation; 2024–2025	Succeeded by Koen Becking
Preceded by Eddy van Hijum	Minister of Social Affairs and Employment; 2025–2026	Succeeded by Hans Vijlbrief
