= Reinette Klever =

Dutch politician (born 1967)

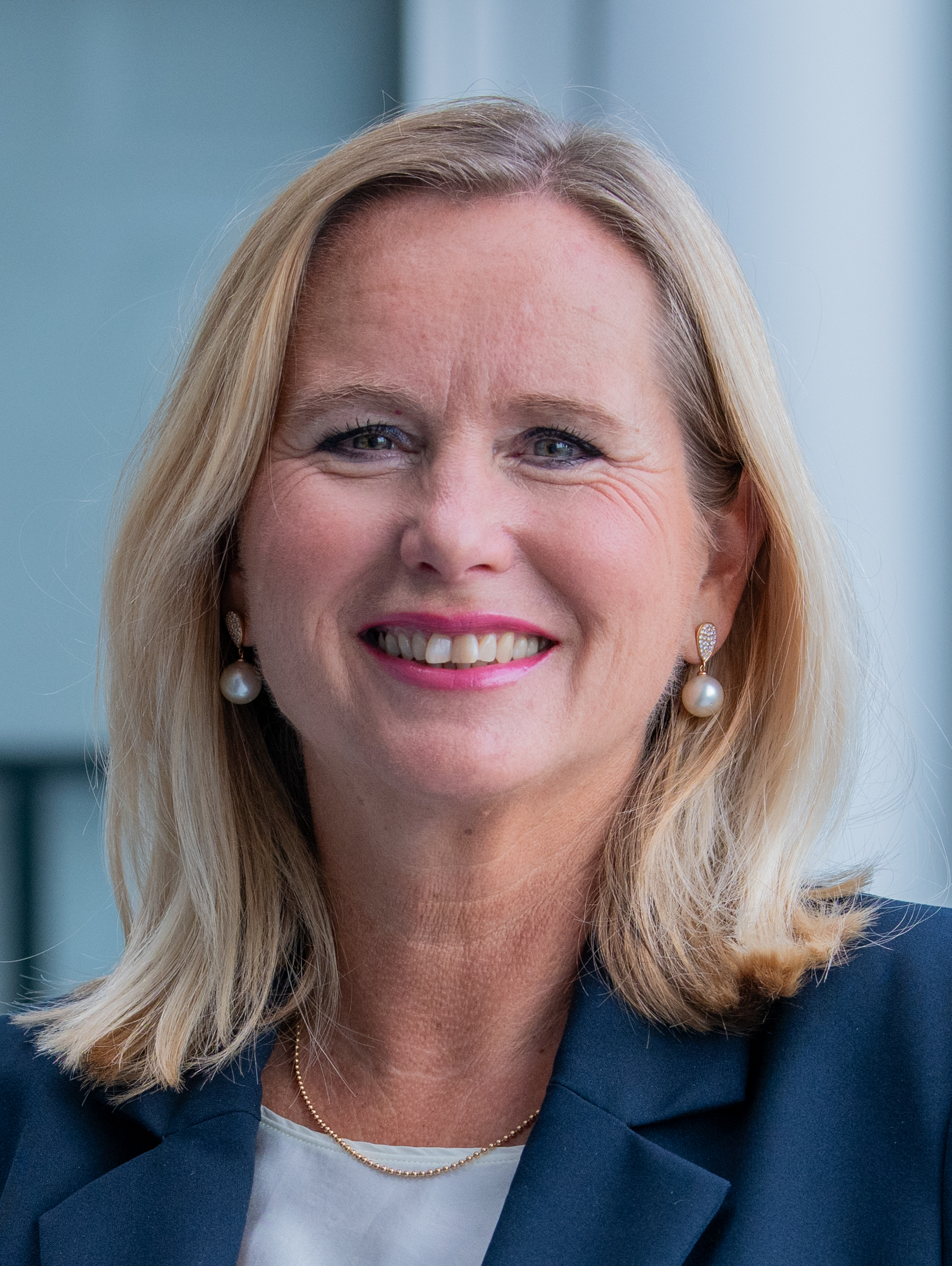
- Klever in 2024

Minister for Foreign Trade and Development
- In office 2 July 2024 – 3 June 2025
- Prime Minister: Dick Schoof
- Minister: Caspar Veldkamp
- Preceded by: Liesje Schreinemacher

Member of the House of Representatives
- In office 20 September 2012 – 23 March 2017

Member of the Senate
- In office 7 June 2011 – 20 September 2012

Personal details
- Born: Reinette Joanne Klever; 21 July 1967 (age 58) Weesp, Netherlands
- Party: Party for Freedom
- Children: 3
- Parent: Wim Klever (father)
- Occupation: Asset manager; politician

Reinette Joanne Klever (born 21 July 1967) is a Dutch politician, asset manager and broadcaster. She has served as Minister for Foreign Trade and Development in the Schoof cabinet since July 2024, on behalf of the Party for Freedom (PVV).

== Early career ==
Klever studied business economics, and she worked for banks and other companies in Paris, New York City, and Santiago. She was a member of the Senate for the Party for Freedom (PVV) from 7 June 2011 to 20 September 2012. She subsequently served as member of the House of Representatives between 20 September 2012 and 23 March 2017, and she was her party's spokesperson for healthcare, economic affairs, and energy. She advocated abolishing health insurance deductibles and proposed to fund this by scrapping the entire development cooperation budget. She also referred to climate change as hoax by the elite in a social media post she later deleted. After her departure from politics in 2017, Klever returned as an employee in her husband's investment company. She complained that her experience as a PVV politician complicated finding jobs.

She joined a think tank advocating a Dutch withdrawal from the European Union in 2019, and she co-founded the alternative media broadcasting association Ongehoord Nederland (ON!) in 2020. She served as an administrator and correspondent of its Zwarte Pietenjournaal, a Sinterklaas-themed news broadcast that was an alternative to Het Sinterklaasjournaal after it stopped including the blackface character Zwarte Piet. When ON! was admitted to the Dutch public broadcasting system in 2022, Klever became a board member and a regular commentator on its TV program Ongehoord Nieuws. She has repeatedly criticized the broadcasting system, which fined ON! for violating its journalistic code. During the COVID-19 pandemic, Klever spread anti-vaccine messaging, and she shared social media posts promoting the Great Reset conspiracy theory.

== Minister for Foreign Trade and Development ==
After the PVV, VVD, NSC, and BBB formed the Schoof cabinet, Klever was sworn in as Minister for Foreign Trade and Development on 2 July 2024, serving as a minister without portfolio at the Ministry of Foreign Affairs. "Development cooperation" was changed to "development" in the title. During her confirmation hearing, she was asked about her sharing a social media post about omvolking, referring to the far-right Great Replacement conspiracy theory. Klever refused to distance herself from the term as she had not used it, and she called it a "factual description of a demographic trend". A motion of no confidence against her by GroenLinks–PvdA did not receive a majority during the cabinet's inaugural debate. After GeenStijl, a blog, reported in August 2024 that Klever had handed over her duties as board member of ON! to her daughter, the Dutch Media Authority responded it was looking into the matter. Klever denied the allegations.

Klever was tasked with executing a budget cut of €2.4 billion per year starting in 2027 that was agreed on in the coalition agreement. She told that the government should prioritize Dutch citizens, and she questioned the scale of Dutch contributions towards international LGBTQ rights. Klever announced that subsidies for non-governmental organization in the period 2026–2030 would be decreased from €1.4 billion to €0.4 billion, prioritizing organizations with alternative sources of funding. During cabinet negotiations for the 2025 budget, Klever requested additional funds in line with economic growth. However, Minister of Finance Eelco Heinen decided to decouple the development aid budget from the size of the economy, which had been in place for decades.

She explored the idea of sheltering rejected African asylum seekers in Uganda in exchange for financial compensation. However, after a trip by Klever to the country, Ugandan foreign affairs minister Jeje Odongo denied that the topic had been discussed.

== Personal life ==
Klever is the daughter of Wim Klever, a philosopher specialized in Baruch Spinoza. As of 2024, she lived with her husband in Ermelo, Gelderland.

Political offices
| Preceded by Liesje Schreinemacher | Minister for Foreign Trade and Development; 2024–present | Incumbent |
