= Wim Klever =

Wilhelmus Nicolaas Antonius (Wim) Klever (born 1930, Snelrewaard) is a Dutch scholar interested in the philosophy of 17th century Jewish Dutch philosopher Baruch Spinoza.

Klever studied philosophy at the Catholic University of Nijmegen and at the Utrecht University.

He is a former lecturer at the Erasmus University in Rotterdam. He also studied the lives and biographies of the people in the circle around Spinoza. This has resulted in numerous publications and books.

Minister Reinette Klever is his daughter.

== Works ==
- (in Dutch) Ethicom, ofwel Spinoza's Ethica vertolkt in tekst en commentaar, Eburon Delft, 1996
- (in Dutch) Mannen rondom Spinoza, Uitgeverij Verloren, Hilversum, 1997, ISBN 90-6550-563-6
