= Steven van Weyenberg =

Dutch politician (born 1973)

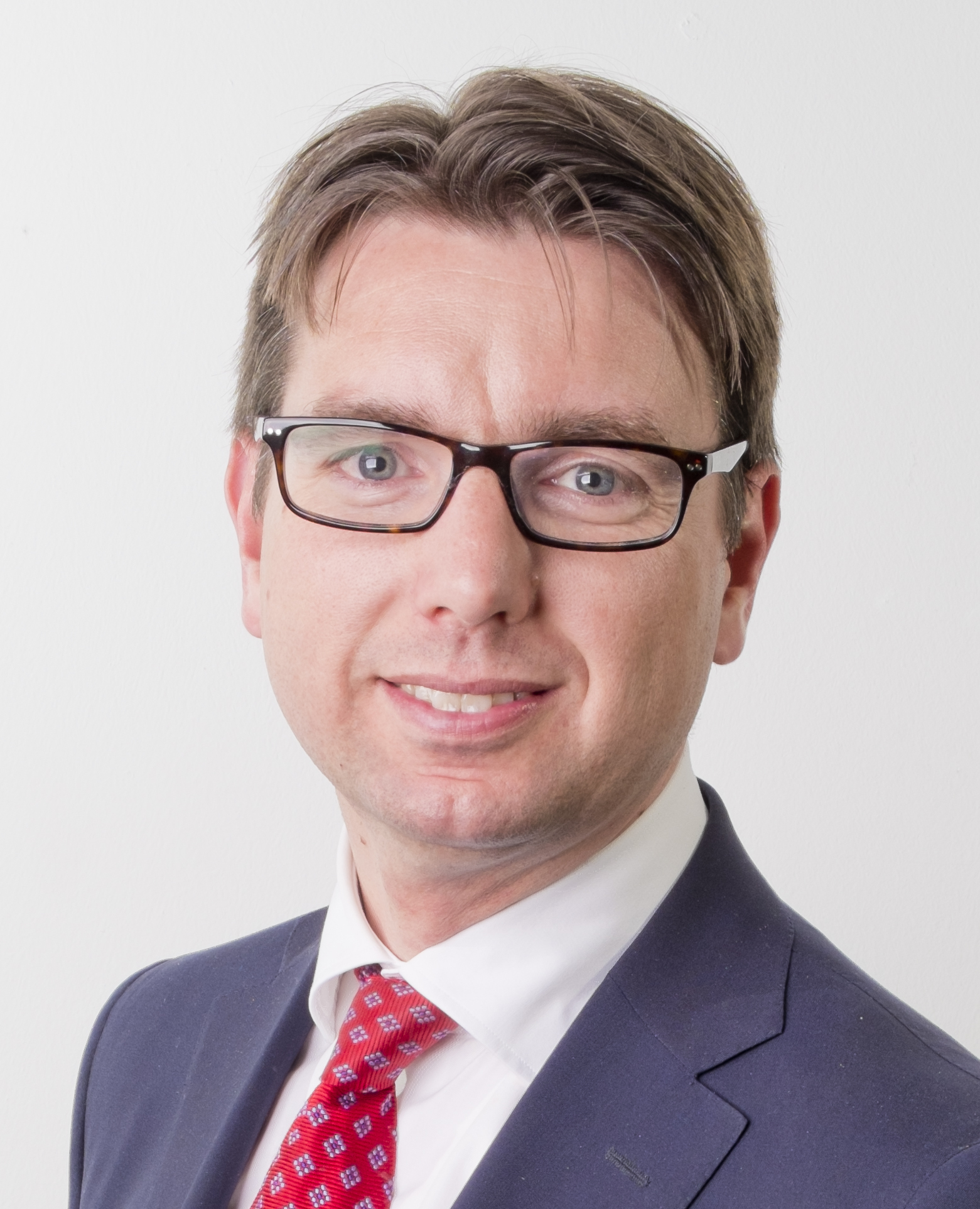
- Van Weyenberg in 2013

Minister of Finance
- In office 12 January 2024 – 2 July 2024
- Prime Minister: Mark Rutte
- Preceded by: Rob Jetten (acting)
- Succeeded by: Eelco Heinen

State Secretary for Culture and Media
- In office 6 December 2023 – 12 January 2024
- Prime Minister: Mark Rutte
- Preceded by: Robbert Dijkgraaf (acting)
- Succeeded by: Fleur Gräper

State Secretary for Infrastructure and Water Management
- In office 10 August 2021 – 10 January 2022
- Prime Minister: Mark Rutte
- Preceded by: Stientje van Veldhoven
- Succeeded by: Vivianne Heijnen

Member of the House of Representatives
- In office 18 January 2022 – 5 December 2023
- In office 20 September 2012 – 2 September 2021

Personal details
- Born: Steven Peter Robert Albert Van Weyenberg; 21 March 1973 (age 53) Ghent, Belgium
- Party: Democrats 66
- Spouse: Sandra Quik
- Education: University of Amsterdam
- Occupation: Politician, civil servant

Steven Peter Robert Albert Van Weyenberg (Note: Usually spelled Steven van Weyenberg (with lowercase 'V') in the Netherlands, although the legal name follows Belgian convention.) (Dutch pronunciation: [ˈsteːvə(ɱ) vɑɱ ˈʋɛiə(m)ˌbɛr(ə)x]; born 21 March 1973) is a Belgian-born Dutch politician of the social-liberal Democrats 66 (D66) party. He served in the House of Representatives and occupied several government positions, most notably Minister of Finance in 2024 in the fourth Rutte cabinet. Since 2025 he has been an alderman in the municipal executive of Amsterdam.

== Career ==
Van Weyenberg studied economics and international relations, and he worked as a civil servant for the Ministry of Economic Affairs and the Ministry of Social Affairs and Employment.

He joined D66 in 1994 and held a seat in the House of Representatives between 2012 and 2023, focusing on finance and social affairs. He assisted his party during negotiations as part of the formation of the third Rutte cabinet, working on reforms of the tax system. These included changes to the home mortgage interest deduction, an increase in the value-added tax rate, and the creation of new environmental taxes. As a member of parliament, Van Weyenberg proposed to abolish government benefits in favor of a single allowance following the childcare benefits scandal, in which citizens had been falsely accused of fraud by the Tax and Customs Administration. He temporarily left the House of Representatives to serve as State Secretary for Infrastructure and Water Management in the demissionary third Rutte cabinet from 10 August 2021 until 10 January 2022. He succeeded Stientje van Veldhoven, who had stepped down to move to another job. When an investigation found that pollution from the Tata Steel IJmuiden factory had resulted in adverse health effects for neighbors, Van Weyenberg said the factory would not have a future without major changes.

Following his return to parliament, he worked with GroenLinks–PvdA and the Christian Union on a set of measures to increase purchasing power amongst a high inflation rate. In August 2023, ahead of a November general election, he announced he would not seek another term. He again filled a vacancy in the demissionary fourth Rutte cabinet starting 6 December 2023, becoming State Secretary for Culture and Media. He switched that position for Minister of Finance on 12 January 2024 to succeed Sigrid Kaag. The succeeding Schoof cabinet was sworn in on 2 July 2024, bringing an end to Van Weyenberg's term.

On 14 May 2025, he was appointed alderman for land and development, spatial planning and housing construction in the municipal executive of Amsterdam, following the resignation of fellow party member Reinier van Dantzig for health reasons.

== Decorations ==
Honours
Ribbon bar	Honour	Country	Date	Ref.
	Knight of the Order of Orange-Nassau	Netherlands	5 December 2023	

== Notes ==
Political offices
Preceded by Rob Jetten; Acting	Minister of Finance; 2024	Succeeded by Eelco Heinen
Preceded by Robbert Dijkgraaf; Acting	State Secretary for Culture and Media; 2023–2024	Succeeded by Fleur Gräper
Preceded by Stientje van Veldhoven	State Secretary for Infrastructure and Water Management; 2021–2022	Succeeded by Vivianne Heijnen
