= Liesje Schreinemacher =

Dutch politician (born 1983)

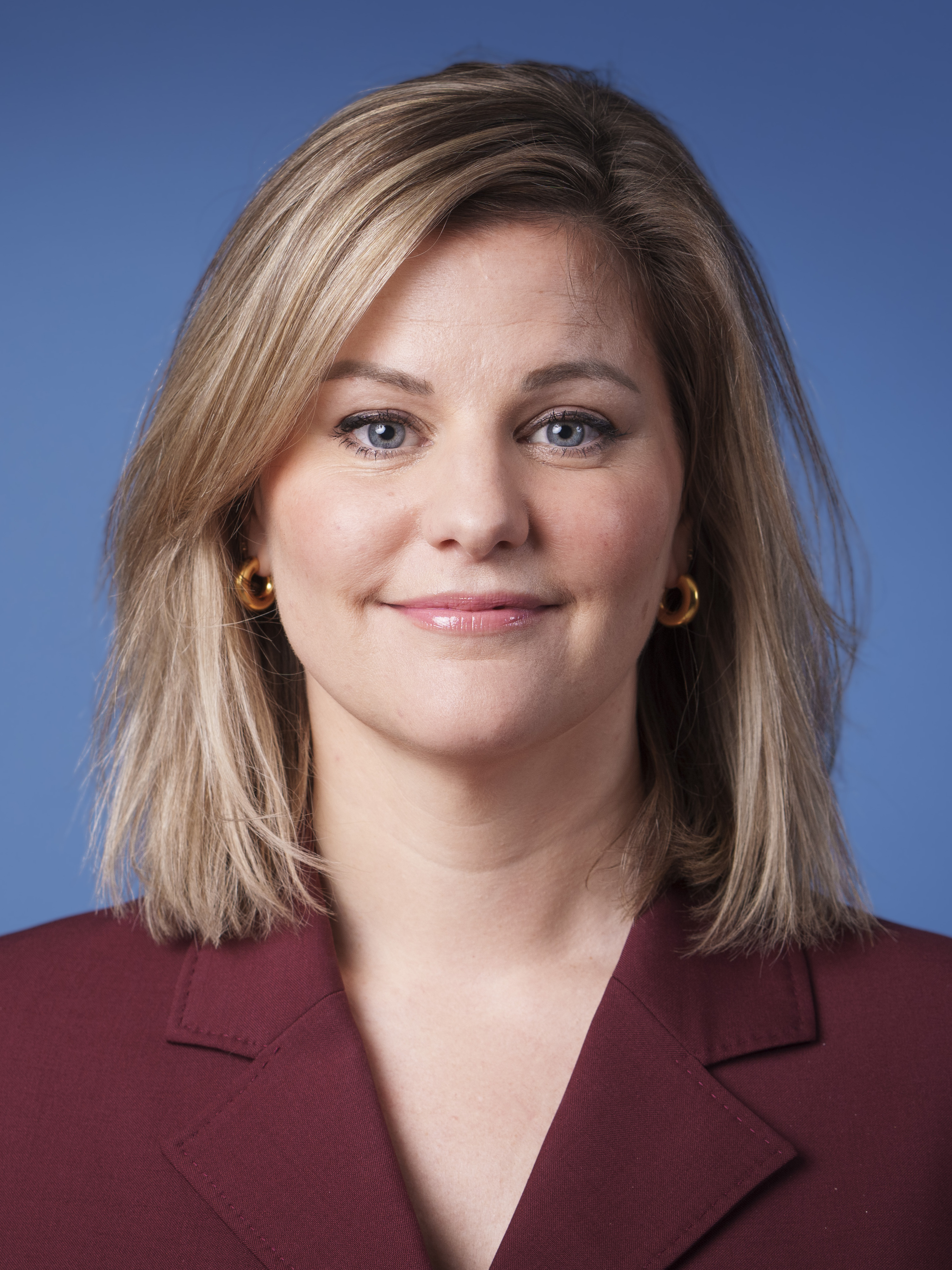
- Schreinemacher in 2023

Minister for Foreign Trade and Development Cooperation
- In office 15 April 2024 – 2 July 2024
- Prime Minister: Mark Rutte
- Preceded by: Geoffrey van Leeuwen
- Succeeded by: Reinette Klever
- In office 10 January 2022 – 4 December 2023
- Prime Minister: Mark Rutte
- Preceded by: Tom de Bruijn
- Succeeded by: Geoffrey van Leeuwen

Minister of Foreign Affairs
- Acting
- In office 1 September 2023 – 5 September 2023
- Prime Minister: Mark Rutte
- Preceded by: Wopke Hoekstra
- Succeeded by: Hanke Bruins Slot

Member of the European Parliament for the Netherlands
- In office 2 July 2019 – 10 January 2022

Personal details
- Born: Elisabeth Nelly Anna Jean Schreinemacher; 13 May 1983 (age 42) Rotterdam, Netherlands
- Party: People's Party for Freedom and Democracy
- Education: UvA (BSc, MSc, LLB); Leiden University (LLM)

Elisabeth Nelly Anna Jean "Liesje" Schreinemacher (born 13 May 1983) is a Dutch lawyer and politician of the People's Party for Freedom and Democracy (VVD) who served as Minister for Foreign Trade and Development Cooperation in the fourth Rutte cabinet from 10 January 2022 to 2 July 2024. She previously served as a Member of the European Parliament from 2019 until 2022.

== Early life and education ==
Schreinemacher was born on 13 May 1983 in Rotterdam, the Netherlands.

In 2002, Schreinemacher went to the University of Amsterdam (UvA) where she obtained a BSc in 2006, followed by an MSc degree in 2008, both in Communication Science. As part of this degree, she undertook electives at San Francisco State University and Sciences Po. In 2012, she obtained a LLB degree in Law from the UvA, before going on to Leiden University, where she obtained an LLM degree in Civil law in 2015.

== Early career ==
Between 2009 and 2012, Schreinemacher served as an assistant to Dutch MPs Johan Remkes and Jeanine Hennis-Plasschaert. She then went on to become an adviser at the Dutch Ministry of Defence until 2016. Between 2016 and 2019, she worked as a lawyer, specialising in construction law and contract law.

== Member of the European Parliament ==
Schreinemacher was elected to the European Parliament in the 2019 European Parliament election, as Member of the European Parliament for the Netherlands.

A member of the People's Party for Freedom and Democracy, Schreinemacher was also part of the Renew Europe parliamentary group. She was a member of the Committee on International Trade (INTA) and the Committee on Legal Affairs (JURI). She was also a substitute on the Committee on the Internal Market and Consumer Protection.

In addition to her committee assignments, Schreinemacher was part of the parliament's delegation for relations with the United States (D-US) and a substitute member of the delegation on Relations with Japan (D-JP). From 2021, she was a member of the Parliament's delegation to the EU-UK Parliamentary Assembly, which provides parliamentary oversight over the implementation of the EU–UK Trade and Cooperation Agreement. She was also a member of the European Parliament Intergroup on Artificial Intelligence and Digital, the European Parliament Intergroup on LGBT Rights and the European Internet Forum.

== Minister for Foreign Trade and Development Cooperation ==
Schreinemacher served as Minister for Foreign Trade and Development Cooperation in the fourth Rutte cabinet that was sworn in on 10 January 2022. The VVD had won a plurality of the votes in the March 2021 general election. In 2023, Schreinemacher became the first Dutch minister in history to take a maternity leave. Geoffrey van Leeuwen temporarily replaced her starting 4 December, and the first child of Schreinemacher and her partner Karsten Meijer, a boy named Titiaan, was born in early January 2024. Schreinemacher returned as minister on 15 April 2024.

In February 2024, the court of appeal of The Hague ruled that deliveries to Israel of F-35 fighter jet spare parts had been illegitimate. It argued that Schreinemacher had made an incorrect decision by allowing the supplies, as the risk was present that Israel was committing war crimes in its Gaza war. Van Leeuwen announced the government would appeal the decision. Schreinemacher's term as minister came to an end on 2 July 2024, when the Schoof cabinet was sworn in.

== Other activities ==
- Asian Development Bank (ADB), Ex-Officio Member of the Board of Governors (since 2022)
- European Bank for Reconstruction and Development (EBRD), Ex-Officio Alternate Member of the Board of Governors (since 2022)
- Inter-American Development Bank (IDB), Ex-Officio Member of the Board of Governors (since 2022)
- Joint World Bank-IMF Development Committee, Alternate Member (since 2022)

== Political positions ==
In parliament, Schreinemacher lobbied hard for creating a two-way street regarding trade with China, saying, “Chinese companies should no longer be allowed to sell us things like buses as long as European companies don't stand a chance on the Chinese market.”

Political offices
Preceded by Wopke Hoekstra	Minister of Foreign Affairs; Acting; 2023	Succeeded by Hanke Bruins Slot
Preceded by Tom de Bruijn	Minister for Foreign Trade and Development Cooperation; 2022–2023	Succeeded by Geoffrey van Leeuwen
Preceded by Geoffrey van Leeuwen	Minister for Foreign Trade and Development Cooperation; 2024	Succeeded by Reinette Klever
