= Eelco Heinen =

Dutch politician (born 1981)

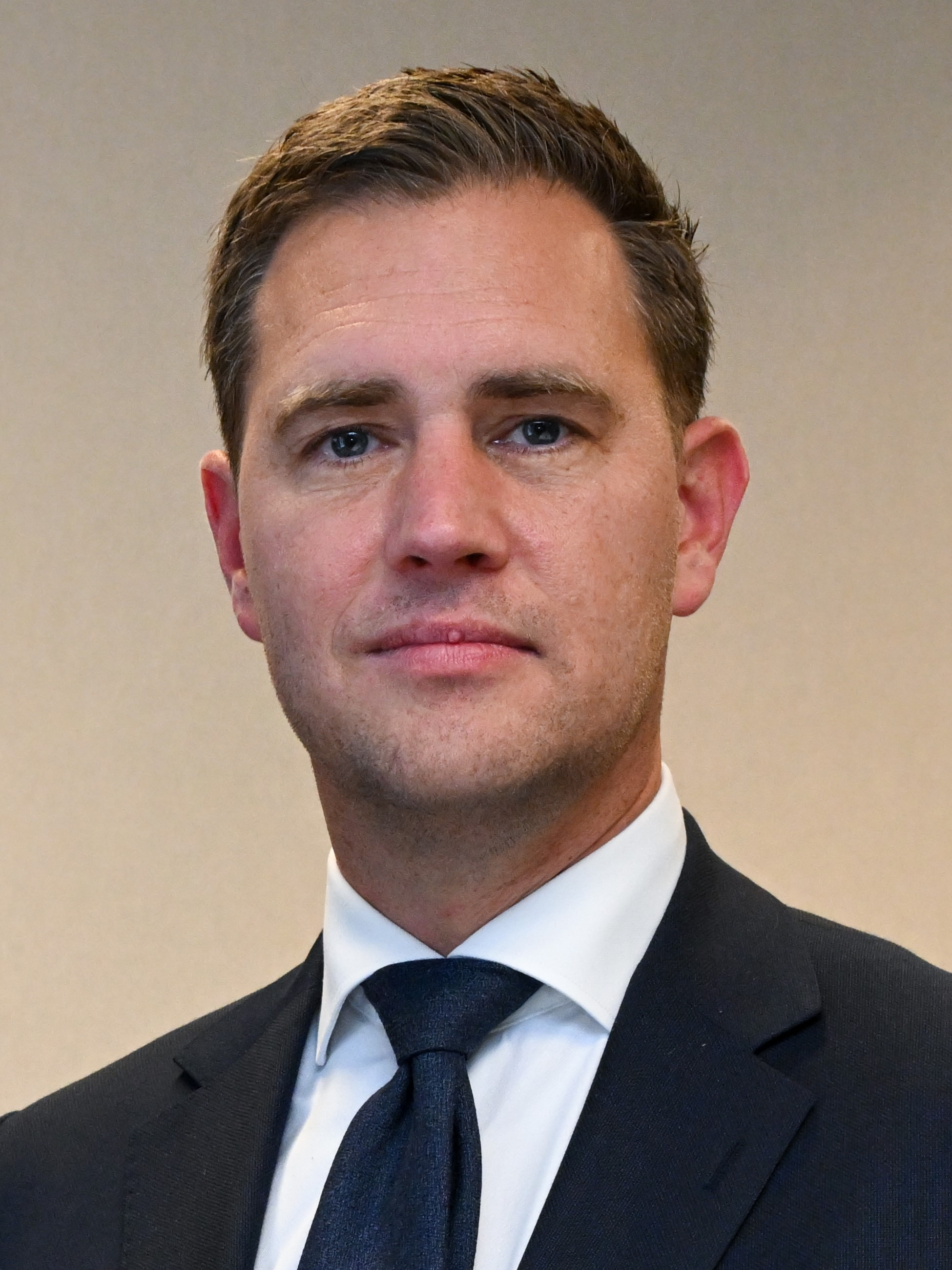
- Heinen in 2024

Minister of Finance
- Incumbent
- Assumed office 2 July 2024
- Prime Minister: Dick Schoof; Rob Jetten
- Preceded by: Steven van Weyenberg

Member of the House of Representatives
- In office 12 November 2025 – 23 February 2026
- In office 31 March 2021 – 2 July 2024
- Succeeded by: Martijn Buijsse

Personal details
- Born: Eelco Heinen; 27 April 1981 (age 45) Laren, Netherlands
- Party: VVD (2006–present)
- Children: 2
- Education: Amsterdam University of Applied Sciences; University of Amsterdam

Eelco Heinen (born 27 April 1981) is a Dutch politician serving as Minister of Finance since 2 July 2024. A member of the People's Party for Freedom and Democracy (VVD), he held a seat in the House of Representatives between March 2021 and July 2024, and previously worked as a party staffer.

== Early life and career ==
Heinen was born in 1981 in the North Holland town Laren, and studied computer science at the Amsterdam University of Applied Sciences from 1998 until 2002. Heinen subsequently studied economics at the University of Amsterdam. After he graduated with a Master of Science degree in macroeconomics in 2005, he did another master's in international relations. He became a policy officer at the Ministry of Finance in 2007.

Between 2011 and 2014, Heinen worked as senior finance policy advisor for the VVD's House caucus and was promoted to political secretary and head of policy in the latter year. He had joined the VVD in 2006. He served as a member of the campaign team for the 2017 election and also helped write the election program.

== Political career ==
=== House of Representatives ===
Heinen – then also political assistant of MP Klaas Dijkhoff – ran for member of parliament in the 2021 general election, being placed twelfth on the VVD's party list. He was again member of the campaign team and of the election program committee. He was elected, receiving 679 preference votes, and he was sworn in as House member on 31 March. Heinen's specialties were government budget, European and international monetary policy, financial markets, financial supervision, state participation, government expenditure, macroeconomic policy, European economic policy, and National Growth Fund, and he was on the Committees for Economic Affairs and Climate Policy, European Affairs, Finance, and Public Expenditure. When prices of petrol were on the rise, Heinen proposed to bring a planned increase in the tax-exempt traveling allowance forward in time. He also complained about spending by the cabinet without the House's approval. The cabinet has this power in case of a crisis, but Heinen decried their repeated use of the provision. He later filed an amendment to only allow usage if the House agreed with the cabinet's reasoning of necessity.

When the fourth Rutte cabinet collapsed in July 2023 – triggering a snap election in November – Heinen became the VVD's campaign leader. Following the election, Heinen remained the VVD's spokesperson for finances and macroeconomic policy (excluding taxation). Furthermore, he assisted party leader Dilan Yeşilgöz alongside Sophie Hermans in talks to form a new governing coalition between the PVV, VVD, NSC, and BBB.

=== Minister of Finance ===
Heinen was sworn in as Minister of Finance in the resulting Schoof cabinet on 2 July 2024, succeeding Steven van Weyenberg. The cabinet's proposal for the 2025 Netherlands budget was presented by Heinen in September 2024, and it would result in a projected budget deficit of 2.5% of GDP. Referring to past low interest rates, Heinen declared that the "time of free money is really over," using this shift to justify the proposal's budget cuts. A Trouw article subsequently mentioned that Heinen presented himself as a "strict guardian of the treasury" and that he helped the VVD return to its traditional liberal economic values.

In November 2024, Nora Achahbar stepped down as state secretary, reportedly due to remarks she considered offensive, radical, and potentially racist during a Council of Ministers meeting following attacks in Amsterdam targeting supporters of the Israeli football club Maccabi Tel Aviv F.C. Her resignation triggered crisis talks that ultimately averted a cabinet collapse. One particular comparison about antisemitism being more stubborn than a pustule, supposedly made by Heinen, was among those circulating in the media. In response, Heinen stated that he was furious and that he did not recognize himself in the reports.

Heinen has advocated for the further integration of capital markets in the European Union (EU) to increase private investments, calling it the continent's only way to stir economic growth. He has been critical of Eurobonds, proposed government bonds jointly issued by member states, arguing that they would lead to higher debts, low growth, and protectionism.

== Personal life ==
Heinen has a Spanish wife named Inés, and they have two sons. He is a resident of The Hague.

== Electoral history ==
Electoral history of Eelco Heinen
Year	Body	Party	Pos.	Votes	Result		Ref.
Year	Body	Party	Pos.	Votes	Party seats	Individual	Ref.
2021	House of Representatives	People's Party for Freedom and Democracy	12	679	34 / 150	Won	
2023	House of Representatives	People's Party for Freedom and Democracy	7	3,159	24 / 150	Won	
2025	House of Representatives	People's Party for Freedom and Democracy	2	126,213	22 / 150	Won	
2026	The Hague Municipal Council	People's Party for Freedom and Democracy	49 (Note: Heinen participated as lijstduwer.)	121	3 / 45	Lost	

== Notes ==
Political offices
Preceded by Steven van Weyenberg	Minister of Finance; 2024–present	Incumbent
