= Ter Apel application centre =

Dutch asylum seekers' centre

The Ter Apel application centre of the Central Agency for the Reception of Asylum Seekers (Centraal Orgaan opvang asielzoekers; COA), located on the west side of the village of Ter Apel, is one of the largest asylum seekers' centres in the Netherlands. On average, around 2,000 asylum seekers stay at the centre every night. Almost all asylum seekers are required to report here upon arrival in the Netherlands. The centre also has a processing reception location, a reception centre for unaccompanied minor foreign nationals, a detention facility and a sober reception centre for asylum seekers from "safe countries".

== History ==
In May 1996, a centre for rejected asylum seekers was opened on a former NATO site near Ter Apel. In June 2001, the 'Ebony' registration centre of the Dutch Immigration and Naturalisation Service was opened. In 2010, the COA and the municipality of Vlagtwedde concluded an administrative agreement, based on the COA Ter Apel master plan, which led to the demolition and replacement of all buildings on the grounds.

=== Health problems ===
After new construction began at the centre in 2015, staff absenteeism suddenly increased. Research by the Dagblad van het Noorden in March 2017 revealed that old soil contamination on the grounds of the centre had not been adequately addressed. A subsequent study commissioned by the COA found that health complaints were attributable to the poor condition of the buildings. Employees were suffering from complaints consistent with sick building syndrome. Following the study, several modifications were made to the buildings to create a healthier indoor environment.

=== Asylum crisis (2021 – present) ===
After weeks of unrest, the Groningen safety region declared the increased influx of asylum seekers to be a serious crisis in October 2021 and initiated Article 51 proceedings, normally used only in cases of natural disasters or other crises. The situation in the centre was deemed untenable; 750 asylum seekers were staying in the night shelter, while there was room for just 275. The national government did not respond to the safety region's request. In April 2022 the mayor of Groningen Koen Schuiling spoke out regarding the conditions in the asylum seekers' centre and the government's inability to do anything about them. As a result of the capacity problems, hundreds of asylum seekers were forced to sleep outside the centre in August 2022.

== Facilities ==
The centre contains the Immigration and Naturalisation Service's Application Centre (aanmeldcentrum; ac), the Central Reception Location (centrale ontvangstlocatie; col), the Process Reception Location (procesopvanglocatie; pol), the Location for Unaccompanied Minor Foreign Nationals (alleenstaande minderjarige vreemdelingen; AMV), the Restrictive Liberty Location (vrijheidsbeperkende locatie; vbl), and a reception facility for asylum seekers with a low chance of success in asylum applications, the Process Availability Location (procesbeschikbaarheidslocatie; pbl).

== Transport ==
Bus stop sign to Ter Apel application centre at Emmen train station in 2026

Asylum seekers often travel by bus between Emmen Station and the asylum seekers' centre. After the start of the European refugee crisis, security guards were placed on the buses, funded by Qbuzz and the provinces of Groningen and Drenthe. There were frequent incidents of violence on the bus line. In April 2019, State Secretary Mark Harbers of Justice and Security decided that special shuttle buses would be deployed for a period to relieve the regular bus line. In August 2021, this was extended until the end of the year. In 2022, funds were allocated to keep the shuttle bus running until 2026.
