= Dennis Wiersma =

Dutch politician (born 1986)

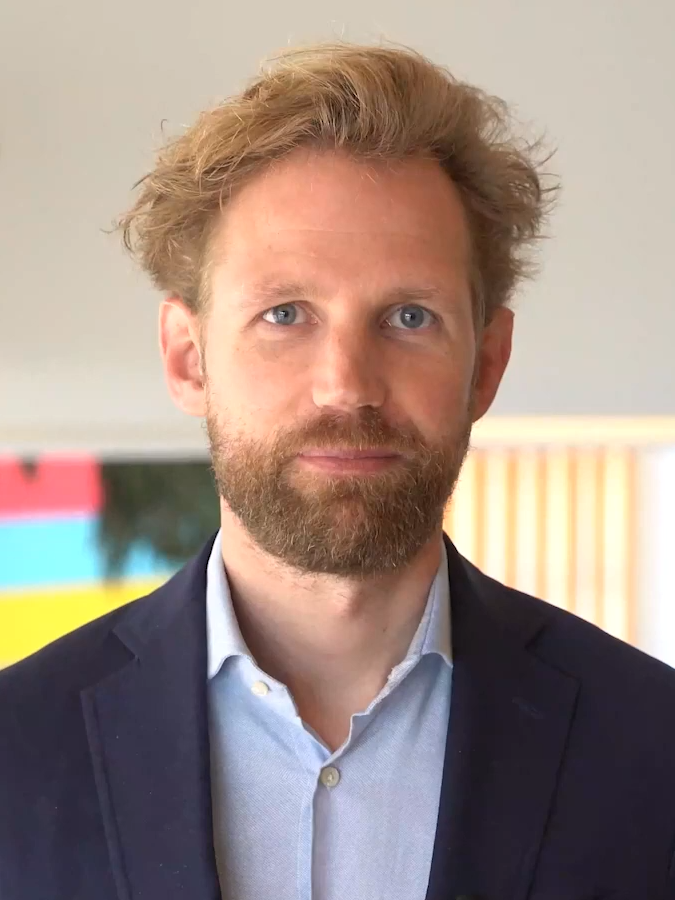
- Wiersma in 2022

Minister for Primary and Secondary Education
- In office 10 January 2022 – 22 June 2023
- Prime Minister: Mark Rutte
- Preceded by: Arie Slob
- Succeeded by: Mariëlle Paul

State Secretary for Social Affairs and Employment
- In office 10 August 2021 – 10 January 2022
- Prime Minister: Mark Rutte
- Preceded by: Bas van 't Wout
- Succeeded by: Position abolished

Member of the House of Representatives
- In office 23 March 2017 – 3 September 2021

Personal details
- Born: Auke Dennis Wiersma; 19 February 1986 (age 40) Franeker, Netherlands
- Party: People's Party for Freedom and Democracy
- Education: University of Groningen

Auke Dennis Wiersma (born 19 February 1986) is a Dutch politician, who served as a member of the House of Representatives from 2017 to 2021. A member of the People's Party for Freedom and Democracy (VVD), he was appointed State Secretary for Social Affairs and Employment on 10 August 2021, succeeding Bas van 't Wout.

On 10 January 2022, he was appointed Minister for Primary and Secondary Education in the fourth Rutte cabinet.

On the 22nd of June 2023, he announced his resignation as minister following multiple allegations of temper incidents, the first of which being made in April 2023.

== Electoral history ==
Electoral history of Dennis Wiersma
Year	Body	Party	Pos.	Votes	Result		Ref.
Year	Body	Party	Pos.	Votes	Party seats	Individual	Ref.
2021	House of Representatives	People's Party for Freedom and Democracy	9	1,807	34	Won	
