= Martijn Buijsse =

Dutch politician

Member of the House of Representatives
- In office 4 July 2024 – 11 November 2025
- Preceded by: Eelco Heinen

Personal details
- Born: 21 September 1981 (age 44) Oostburg, Netherlands
- Party: People's Party for Freedom and Democracy
- Occupation: Politician

Martijn R.G. Buijsse (born 21 September 1981) is a Dutch politician for the People's Party for Freedom and Democracy (VVD), who was a member of the House of Representatives between July 2024 and November 2025. He succeeded Eelco Heinen, who had been appointed finance minister in the Schoof cabinet. Buijse was the VVD's spokesperson on public administration and environment.

== House committees ==
- Committee for the Interior
- Committee for Digital Affairs
- Committee for Housing and Spatial Planning

== Electoral history ==
Electoral history of Martin Buijsse
Year	Body	Party	Pos.	Votes	Result		Ref.
Year	Body	Party	Pos.	Votes	Party seats	Individual	Ref.
2021	House of Representatives	People's Party for Freedom and Democracy	53	781	34 / 150	Lost	
2023	House of Representatives	People's Party for Freedom and Democracy	28	1,541	24 / 150	Lost (Note: Buijsse was appointed to the body later during the term due to a vacancy.)	
2025	House of Representatives	People's Party for Freedom and Democracy	34	1,297	22 / 150	Lost	
2026	Boekel Municipal Council	People's Party for Freedom and Democracy	18 (Note: Buijsse participated as lijstduwer.)	20	1 / 15	Lost	

== See also ==
- List of members of the House of Representatives of the Netherlands, 2023–2025
