= Vivianne Heijnen =

Dutch politician (born 1982)

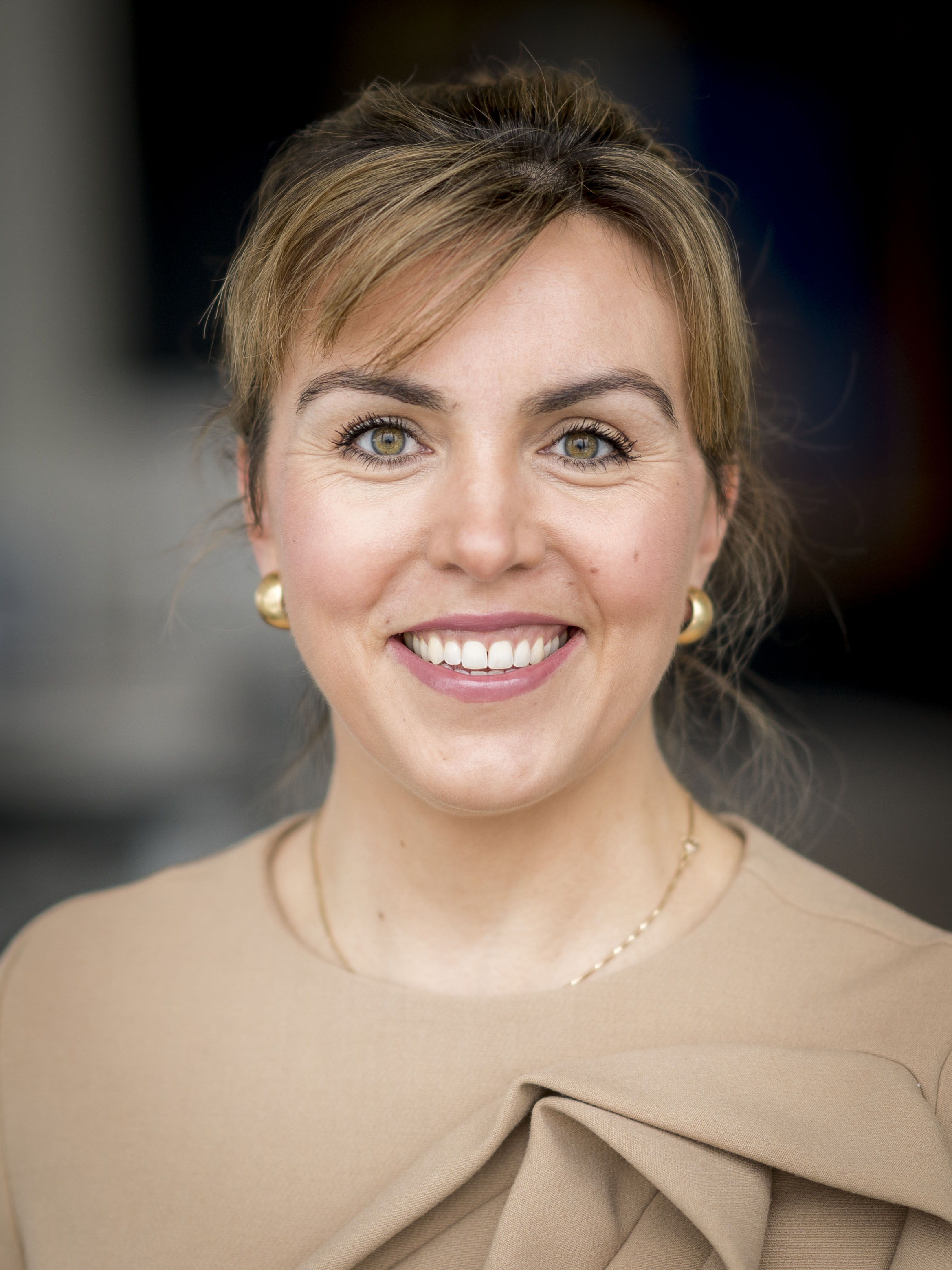
- Heijnen in 2022

Minister for the Environment (Note: Nationally, her position is known as State Secretary for Infrastructure and Water Management.)
- In office 10 January 2022 – 24 May 2024
- Prime Minister: Mark Rutte
- Preceded by: Steven van Weyenberg
- Succeeded by: Mark Harbers

Alderwoman in Maastricht
- In office 18 June 2018 – 9 January 2022
- Succeeded by: Niels Peeters

Member of the Maastricht municipal council
- In office 6 April 2010 – 18 June 2018
- Succeeded by: Florence van der Heijden

Personal details
- Born: V.L.W.A. Heijnen; 8 October 1982 (age 43) Spaubeek, Netherlands
- Party: Christian Democratic Appeal
- Education: Maastricht University
- Occupation: Politician; academic administrator; lobbyist

Vivianne L.W.A. Heijnen (born 8 October 1982) is a Dutch politician of the Christian Democratic Appeal (CDA) party. She served as Minister for the Environment as part of the fourth Rutte cabinet starting in January 2022 until the start of her maternity leave in May 2024. She did not return afterwards, as the Schoof cabinet was formed in July 2024. Heijnen was previously head of the Brussels campus of her alma mater Maastricht University, and she was active in local politics in Maastricht as municipal councilor (2010–18) and alderwoman (2018–22).

== Early life and career ==
Heijnen was born and raised in Spaubeek, a village in Limburg, with her brother. Her father, Thijs, owned a business, while her mother, Gabriëlle, worked as a logopedist. Her grandfather, Hein Corten, had served as the mayor of Ulestraten, Schimmert, and Susteren as a member of the VVD. Heijnen attended the Geleen secondary school Graaf Huyn College and started studying law at Maastricht University in 2000. She left two years later to study European studies at the same university and received her Master of Arts degree in European public affairs in 2006. Heijnen subsequently worked as a freelance lobbyist in Brussels for clients such as pension fund ABP. She took a job as tutor at Maastricht University in 2008 and became head of its Brussels campus the following year. The campus, which is situated in a single building and started out with a €250,000 annual budget, opened in 2010 and moved to a different location in April 2018, at a time when its budget had been doubled. She left her job upon her appointment as alderwoman two months later.

== Maastricht politics ==
Heijnen participated in the March 2010 municipal election in Maastricht, being placed fourth on the CDA's party list. She had decided to become politically involved as a result of her role as a lobbyist. Her party won seven seats in the council, but Heijnen was not elected as candidates lower on the list had cleared the preference vote threshold. She was appointed to the council on 6 April after two CDA councilors stepped down to become aldermen in the new municipal executive. In October 2010, the CDA's council group leader, Peter Geelen, resigned following the falling apart of the government coalition, which later resulted in the CDA becoming an opposition party in Maastricht for the first time since World War II. Heijnen was chosen to succeed him in late November, and she said that safety would be one of the party's priorities. The Maastricht CDA decided the following year to call for the closing of all coffeeshops in the city because of the nuisances they were causing. Heijnen was re-elected to the council in March 2014 as lead candidate, while her party lost two seats. She headed a confidential committee in 2015 to find a new mayor for Maastricht, which recommended Annemarie Penn-te Strake. Heijnen also tried without success to bring the headquarters of the European Medicines Agency from London to South Limburg, when it had to be relocated as a result of Brexit.

She ran for member of parliament in the 2017 general election as the CDA's 26th candidate. She received 15,821 preference votes, 90% of which were cast in her home province of Limburg, but she was not elected due to her party winning nineteen seats. Locally, Heijnen was again her party's lead candidate in the March 2018 municipal elections. The CDA won a plurality in the council, and she kept her seat. She left the council on 18 June 2018 to become alderwoman and deputy mayor in the new municipal executive. Her responsibilities included the economy, the job market, regionalization, housing, well-being, permits, social innovation, and smart city. To increase citizen participation in local politics, Heijnen organized a forum, during which inhabitants could determine on which projects €300,000 of the municipal budget would be spent, following a similar idea in Antwerp. Its first round was held in 2021 after a number of postponements due to the COVID-19 pandemic. In the run up to a 2020 CDA leadership election, she endorsed Pieter Omtzigt, who would eventually lose. She stepped down as alderwoman when she was appointed Minister for the Environment in January 2022. She also withdrew herself as lead candidate in the 2022 municipal elections.

== Minister for the Environment ==
Heijnen became a member of the new fourth Rutte cabinet and was sworn in on 10 January 2022 at Noordeinde Palace by King Willem-Alexander. She serves as Secretary for Infrastructure and Water Management, succeeding Steven van Weyenberg, but internationally she wears the title of Minister for the Environment. Her portfolio includes environment (excluding climate), soil, public transport, railways, international public transport, cycling policy, sustainable transport, the KNMI, the ANVS, and the PBL. The cabinet extended financial aid to public transport due to the COVID-19 pandemic from September to December 2022. Numerous local politicians warned that ending the aid afterwards would threaten a downgrade of the public transport network due to the sustained effects of the pandemic on ridership, and Heijnen subsequently offered another €150 million in conditional aid for 2023 – significantly less than the €500 million public transport providers had asked for. In March 2022, Heijnen announced a ban on disposable plastic cups and meal packaging in the office, on festivals, and in hotels and restaurants starting in 2024 in line with the European Union's Single-Use Plastics Directive to decrease waste. She later announced the rule would not be fully enforced following critical motions from the House of Representatives. She launched a three-year campaign in 2023 to increase bicycle usage for short distances after the cabinet had the year before appropriated €780 million to improve cycling infrastructure.

When the concession for the Nederlandse Spoorwegen (NS) to operate on the Dutch main rail network neared expiration, Heijnen proposed to renew the concession for the period 2025–33 without accepting bids from other railway operators. International connections – previously all operated by the NS – were offered to others. The concession extension was supported politically in the Netherlands as a result of opposition to further privatization of the railways. However, the European Commission warned a market analysis would have to be performed to consider alternative railway operators, and it started an infringement procedure alleging Heijnen intended to award the concession without a tender shortly before new EU competition regulations would mandate it. Heijnen negotiated the conditions of the new concession, in which the NS would trade its €200 million in yearly exploitation fees for €13 million in subsidies from the government. Heijnen also accepted the introduction of a rush hour charge to spread out passenger load. She promised the House of Representatives to revisit the latter following widespread criticism.

The fourth Rutte cabinet collapsed on 7 July 2023 due to disagreements over asylum reforms and continued as a caretaker government. Heijnen went on maternity leave starting 25 May 2024, and her tasks were performed by Minister of Infrastructure and Water Management Mark Harbers. She could not return afterwards, as the Schoof cabinet was sworn in on 2 July 2024.
