= Hanke Bruins Slot =

Dutch politician and army officer (born 1977)

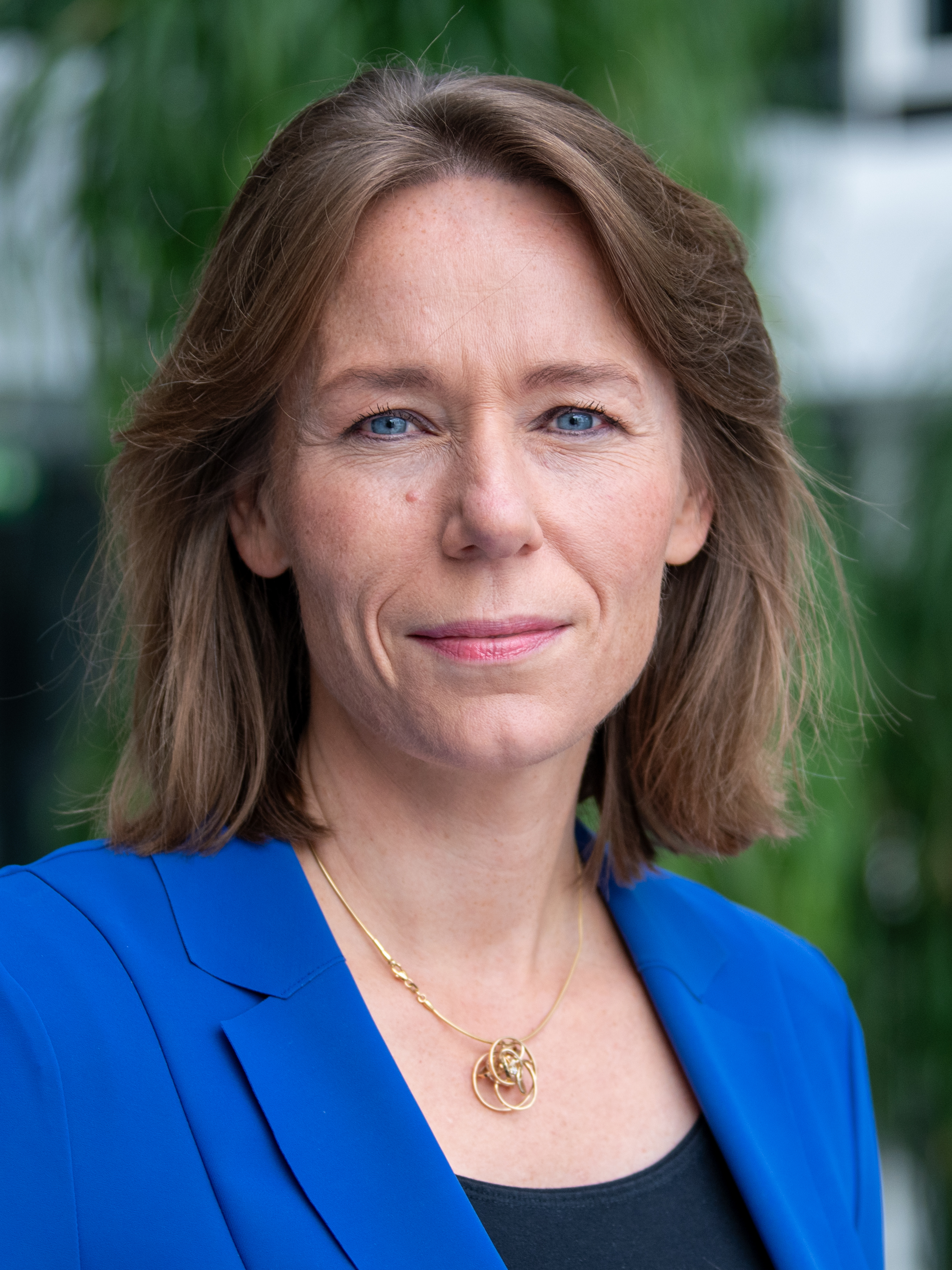
- Bruins Slot in 2023

Minister of Foreign Affairs
- In office 5 September 2023 – 2 July 2024
- Prime Minister: Mark Rutte
- Preceded by: Liesje Schreinemacher (acting)
- Succeeded by: Caspar Veldkamp

Minister of the Interior and Kingdom Relations
- In office 10 January 2022 – 5 September 2023
- Prime Minister: Mark Rutte
- Preceded by: Kajsa Ollongren
- Succeeded by: Hugo de Jonge

Member of the Provincial Executive of Utrecht
- In office 5 June 2019 – 10 January 2022

Member of the House of Representatives
- In office 17 June 2010 – 4 June 2019

Personal details
- Born: Hanke Gerdina Johannette Bruins Slot; 20 October 1977 (age 48) Apeldoorn, Netherlands
- Party: Christian Democratic Appeal
- Spouse: Mireille (m. 2019)
- Education: Utrecht University (LLM, MA); Royal Military Academy

Military service
- Allegiance: Kingdom of the Netherlands
- Branch/service: Royal Netherlands Army
- Years of service: 2007–2010, 2024–present
- Rank: Major general
- Battles/wars: War in Afghanistan

Hanke Gerdina Johannette Bruins Slot (born 20 October 1977) is a Dutch politician and military veteran who served as Minister of the Interior and Kingdom Relations from 2022 to 2023 and Minister of Foreign Affairs from 2023 until 2024. She is a member of the Christian Democratic Appeal (CDA).

== Early career ==
Prior to her political career, Bruins Slot served in the Royal Netherlands Army; she was deployed to Uruzgan Province, Afghanistan. In 2010, she was conferred the rank of artillery captain.

== Political career ==
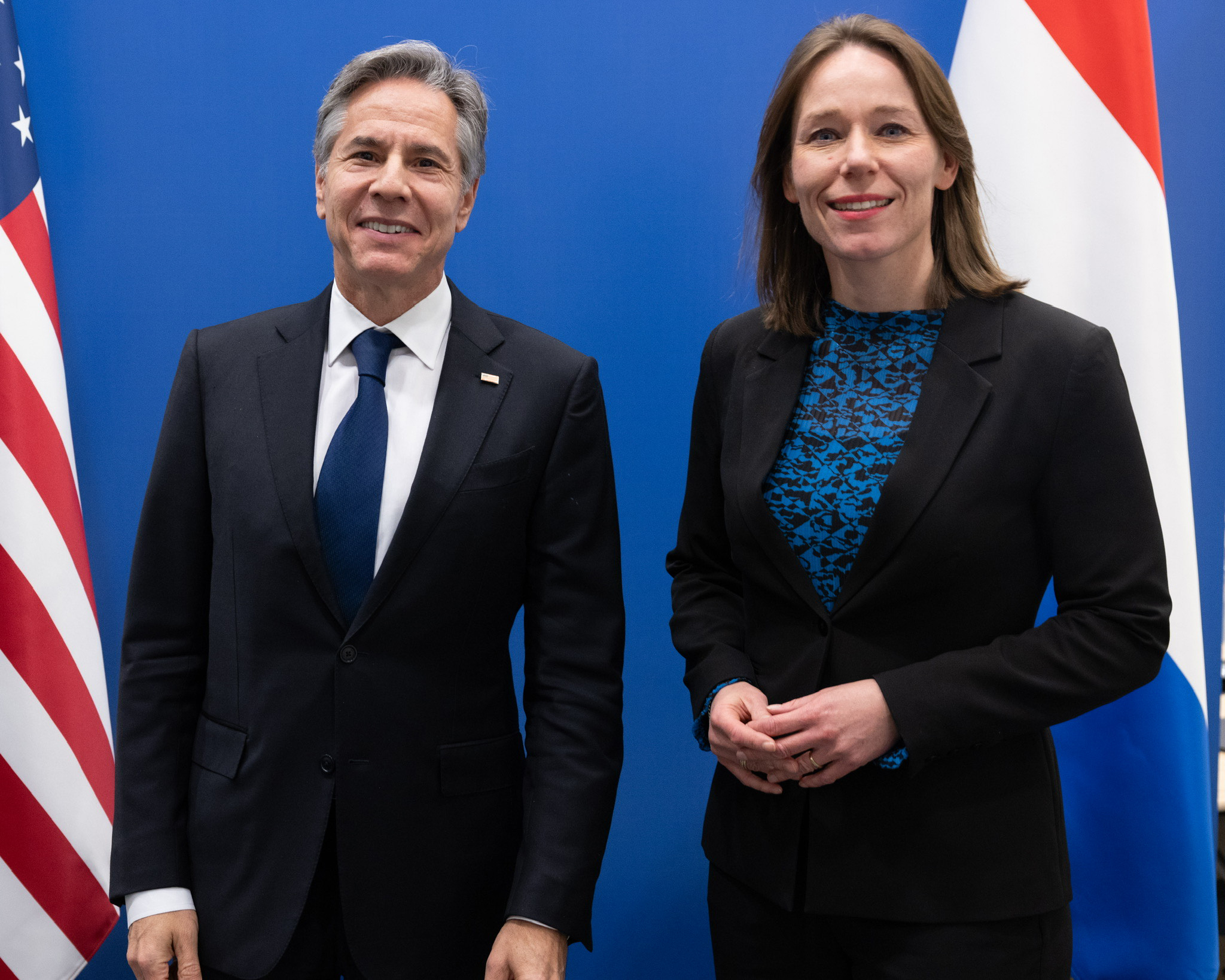
Bruins Slot meets with U.S. Secretary of State Antony Blinken in Brussels, 28 November 2023

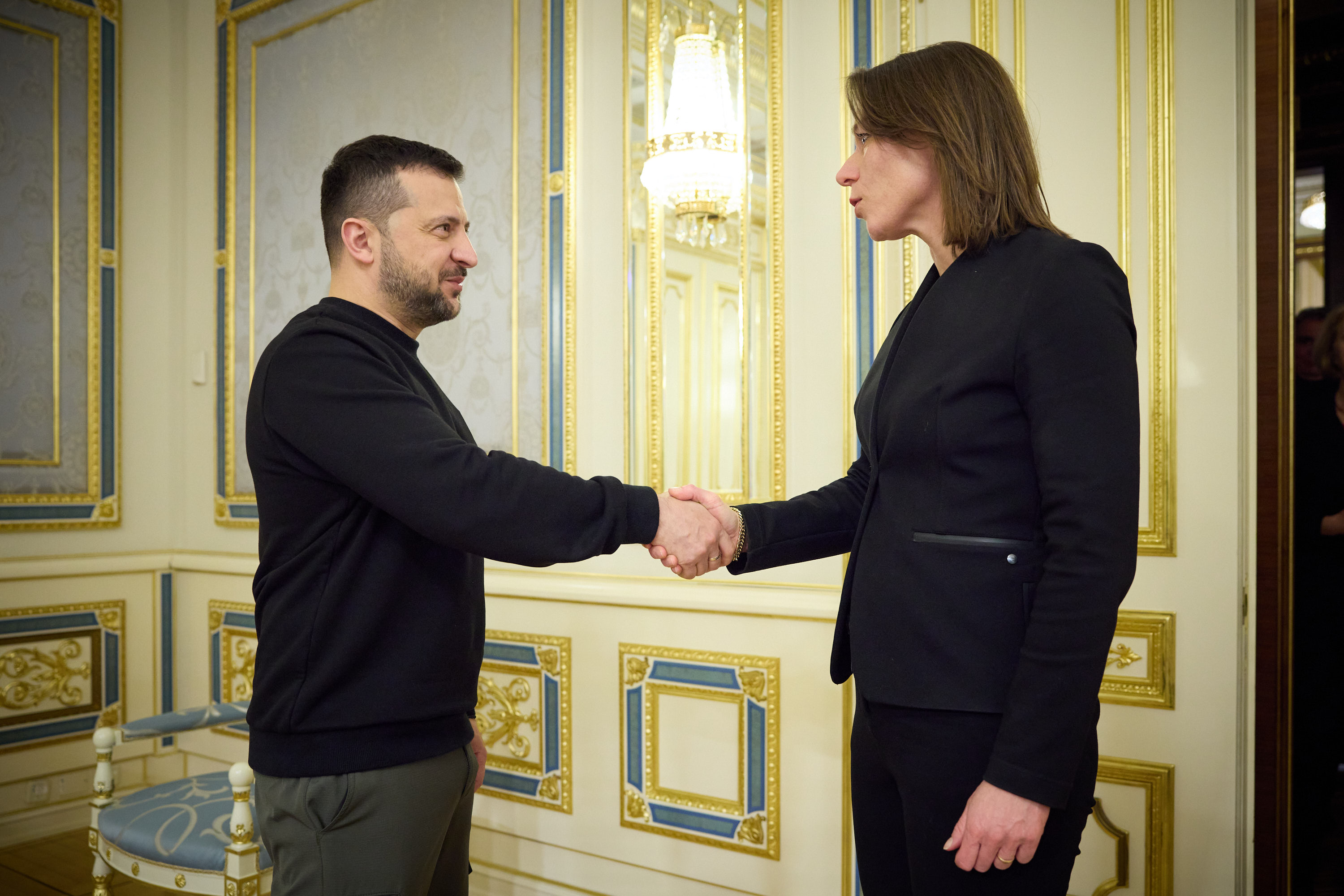
Hanke Bruins Slot meets with Ukrainian President Volodymyr Zelenskyy in December 2023.

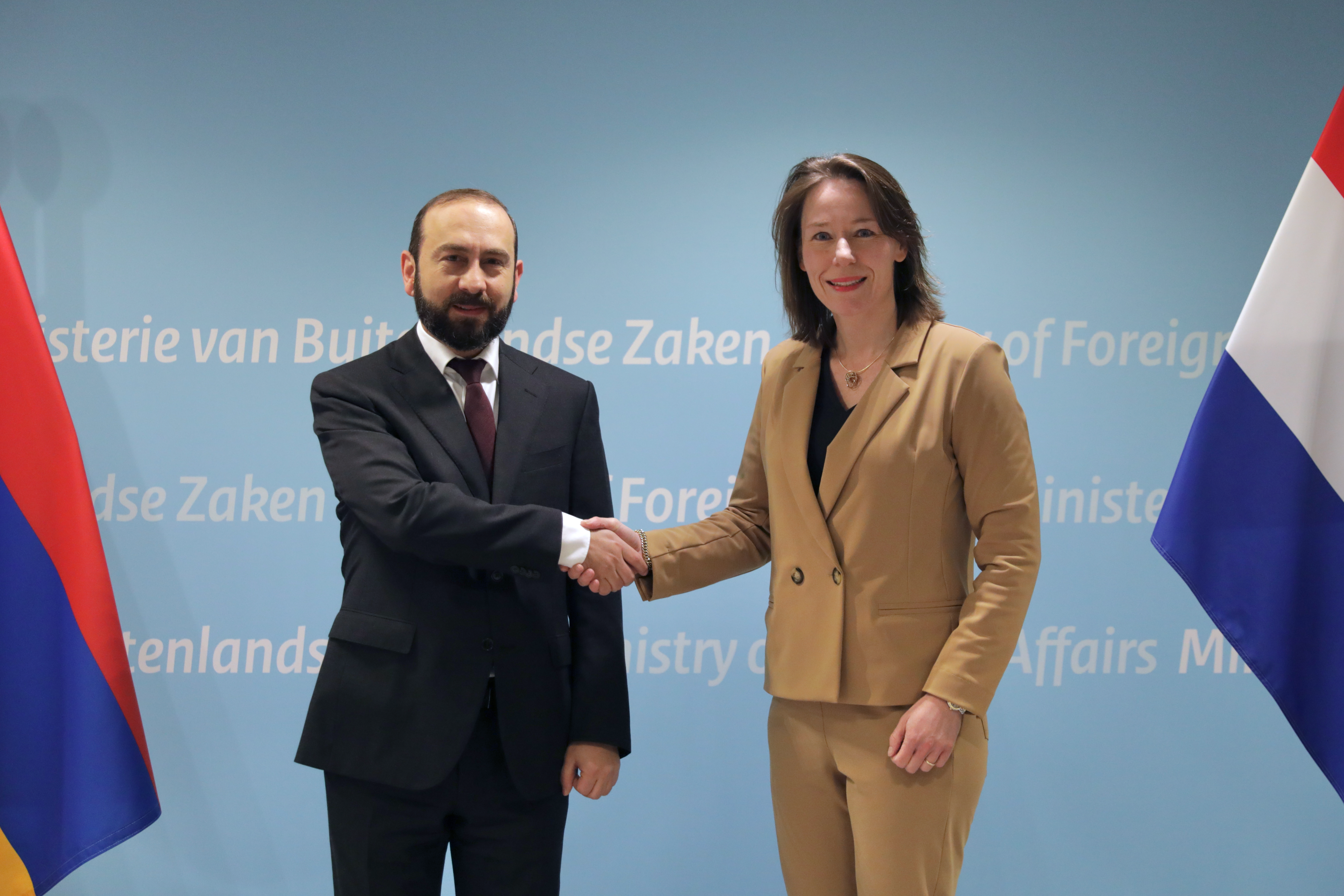
Bruins Slot meets with Armenian Foreign Minister Ararat Mirzoyan in The Hague, 8 February 2024

A member of the Christian Democratic Appeal (CDA), Bruins Slot served in the House of Representatives from 2010 to 2019. She focused her work as a parliamentarian on matters of defence personnel, local government, healthcare science, medical law, psychiatry and sports.

From 2019 to 2022, Bruins Slot was a member of the provincial executive of Utrecht, in which she was in charge of nature, agriculture, soil and water, sport and governance.

In February 2024, she stated that Israel's planned assault on Rafah was "unjustifiable".

In April 2024 the European Commission co-hosted a conference on "restoring justice for Ukraine" in The Hague. Significant contributors were Slot as the Dutch Minister of Foreign Affairs, the Ukrainian Minister of Foreign Affairs, Dmytro Kuleba and the Commissioner for Justice, Didier Reynders. The following month, Bruins Slot said that the Netherlands would not object if Ukraine used Dutch-supplied F-16 fighters to strike targets inside Russia.

She returned to the Royal Netherlands Army in February 2025, after her term as Minister of Foreign Affairs had ended, in the rank of major general.

== Personal life ==
Slot was born in Apeldoorn and grew up in Winsum, Zeewolde, and Ridderkerk. She is married. Her father, grandfather and uncle have all been mayors.

== Honours ==
- Spain: Grand Cross of the Order of Civil Merit (9 April 2024)
- Netherlands: Officer in the Order of Orange-Nassau
- France: Commander of the Ordre national du Mérite

Political offices
| Preceded by Liesje Schreinemacher (acting) | Minister of Foreign Affairs; 2023–2024 | Succeeded by Caspar Veldkamp |
