= Mark Harbers =

Dutch politician (born 1969)

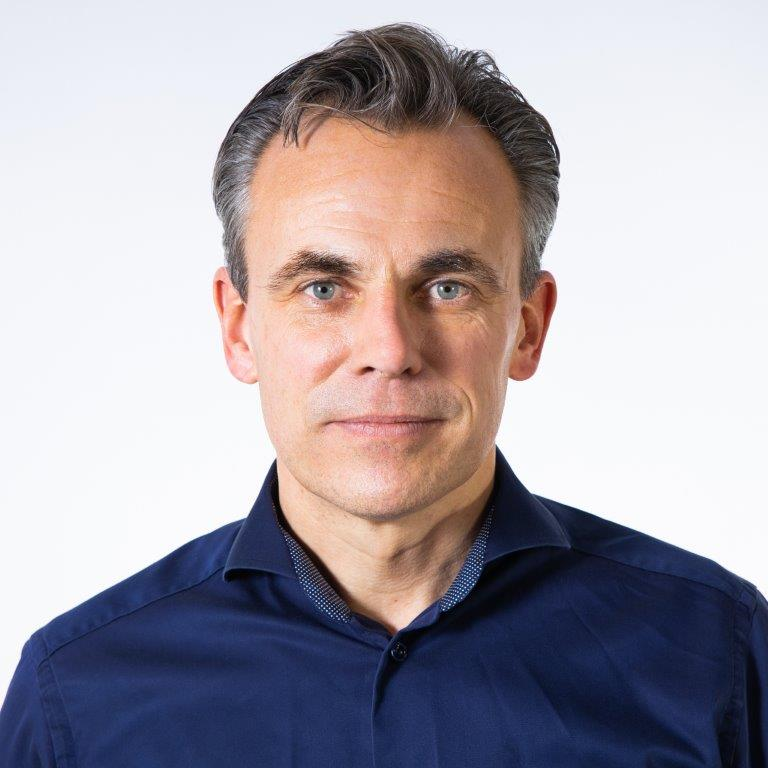
- Harbers in 2020

Minister of Infrastructure and Water Management
- In office 10 January 2022 – 2 July 2024
- Prime Minister: Mark Rutte
- Preceded by: Barbara Visser
- Succeeded by: Barry Madlener

State Secretary for Justice and Security
- In office 26 October 2017 – 21 May 2019
- Prime Minister: Mark Rutte
- Preceded by: Klaas Dijkhoff
- Succeeded by: Ankie Broekers-Knol

Member of the House of Representatives
- In office 11 June 2019 – 10 January 2022
- In office 1 December 2009 – 26 October 2017

Personal details
- Born: 19 April 1969 (age 57) Ede, Netherlands
- Party: People's Party for Freedom and Democracy
- Occupation: Communication employee, politician

Markus Gerardus Jozef "Mark" Harbers (born 19 April 1969) is a Dutch politician who served as Minister of Infrastructure and Water Management in the Fourth Rutte cabinet from 10 January 2022 to 2 July 2024. A member of the People's Party for Freedom and Democracy (VVD), he previously served State Secretary for Justice and Security in the Third Rutte cabinet from 26 October 2017 until 21 May 2019.

== Early life and education ==
Harbers was born in Ede, Gelderland. He studied economics at Erasmus University Rotterdam but dropped out before graduation.

== Political career ==
=== Career in local politics ===
A former communication employee, Harbers served as a member of the district council of Kralingen-Crooswijk from 1992 to 1998 and municipal councillor of Rotterdam from 2002 until 2007. He was an alderman from 2007 to 2009, in charge of Economic Affairs, the Port of Rotterdam and the Environment.

=== Career in national politics ===
During the 2006 general election, Harbers occupied the 26th place on the list of VVD candidates; the party obtained 22 seats. On 1 December 2009, he entered the House of Representatives following the resignation of Arend Jan Boekestijn. He was reelected in 2010, 2012 and 2017.

On 26 October 2017, Harbers resigned from the House of Representatives to become State Secretary at the Ministry of Justice and Security, dealing with Asylum and Migration Affairs under the supervision of Minister Ferdinand Grapperhaus.

Effective 21 May 2019, Harbers resigned from his position following the publication of a report minimising the crimes committed by asylum seekers in the Netherlands. He was replaced by Senate President Ankie Broekers-Knol and returned to the House of Representatives shortly thereafter.

=== Minister of Infrastructure and Water Management ===
Early in his tenure, Harbers closed the Netherlands' airspace to Russian aircraft in response to the 2022 Russian invasion of Ukraine. He took over the responsibilities of Minister of the Environment Vivianne Heijnen during her maternity leave starting 25 May 2024. Harbers's term as minister ended on 2 July 2024, when the Schoof cabinet was sworn in.

== Electoral history ==
Electoral history of Mark Harbers
Year	Body	Party	Pos.	Votes	Result		Ref.
Year	Body	Party	Pos.	Votes	Party seats	Individual	Ref.
2021	House of Representatives	People's Party for Freedom and Democracy	7	4,438	34	Won	

Political offices
Preceded by Klaas Dijkhoff	State Secretary for Justice and Security; 2017–2019	Succeeded by Ankie Broekers-Knol
Preceded by Barbara Visser	Minister of Infrastructure and Water Management; 2022–2024	Succeeded by Barry Madlener
