= Geoffrey van Leeuwen =

Dutch diplomat and politician (born 1971)

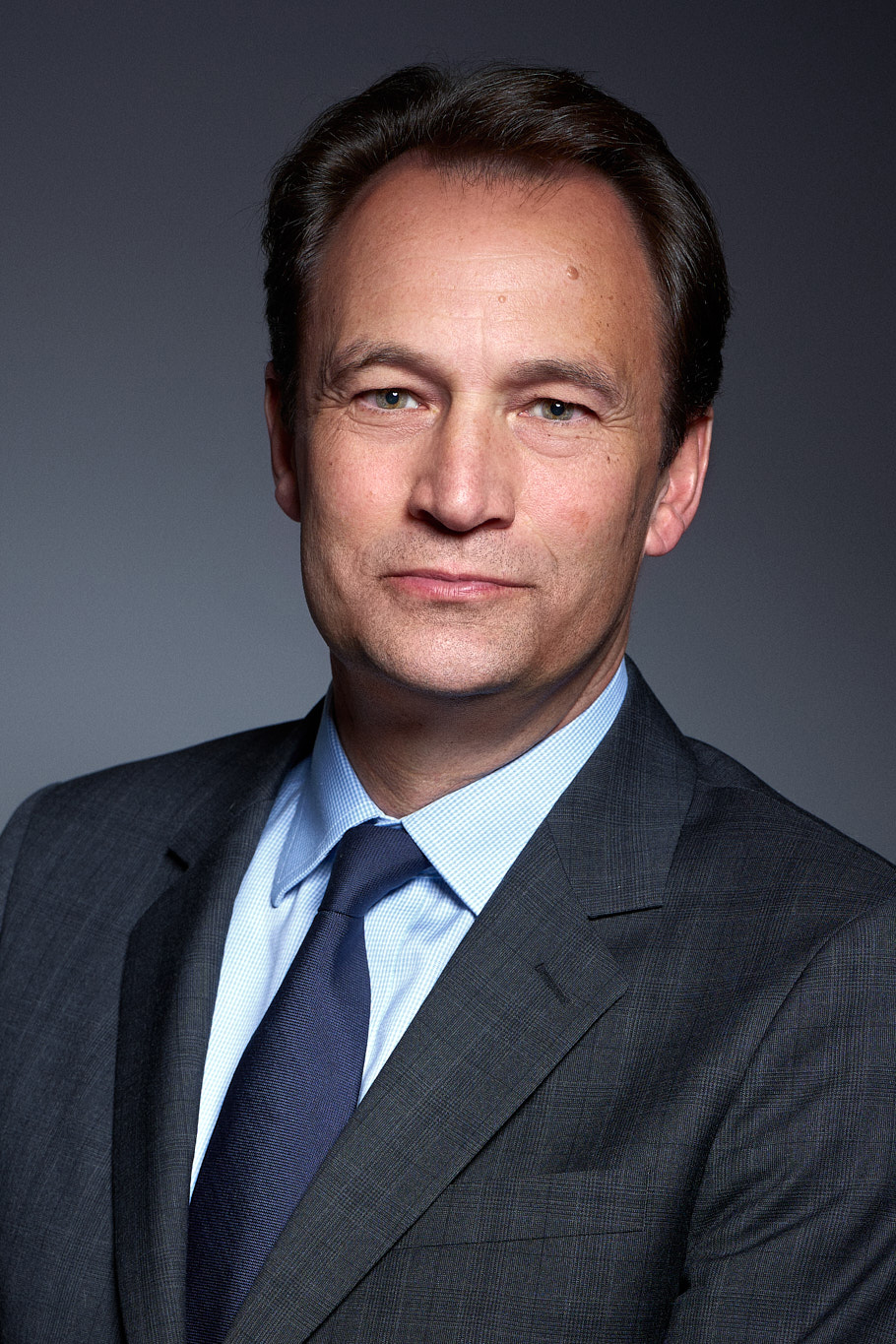
- Geoffrey van Leeuwen, 2026

Minister for Foreign Trade and Development Cooperation
- Acting
- In office 4 December 2023 – 15 April 2024
- Prime Minister: Mark Rutte
- Preceded by: Liesje Schreinemacher
- Succeeded by: Liesje Schreinemacher

Ambassador of the Netherlands to Afghanistan
- In office 2016–2018
- Preceded by: Henk Jan Bakker
- Succeeded by: Ernst Noorman

Personal details
- Born: Geoffrey E. W. van Leeuwen; 7 February 1971 (age 55) The Hague, Netherlands
- Party: People's Party for Freedom and Democracy
- Education: Leiden University (LL.M.); Cambridge University (MPhil)
- Occupation: Diplomat; civil servant

Geoffrey E. W. van Leeuwen (born 7 February 1971) is a Dutch diplomat and civil servant who has served as chief of staff to NATO Secretary General Mark Rutte since 2024. He previously served as ambassador of the Netherlands to Afghanistan (2016–2018) and as acting Minister for Foreign Trade and Development Cooperation (2023–2024) during the maternity leave of Liesje Schreinemacher. Van Leeuwen sat in government as a member of the People's Party for Freedom and Democracy (VVD).

== Biography ==
Van Leeuwen was born in 1971 in The Hague and attended the Stedelijk Gymnasium secondary school in Haarlem. In 1988, Van Leeuwen went to the University of Leiden where he obtained an LL.M. degree in civil law in 1994, and in 1993 he also studied constitutional law at the Paris Institute of Political Studies. He then moved on to the University of Cambridge, obtaining his M.Phil. degree in international affairs in 1995. After completing the conscription as an officer of the Royal Netherlands Army, he held positions in several embassies and at the Ministry of Foreign Affairs.

In 2012 and 2013, Van Leeuwen was part of the management team of an integrated police training mission by the Dutch government in the Afghan province of Kunduz during the war in that country. He subsequently worked as the consul-general of the Dutch consulate-general in Mumbai, and he was appointed ambassador to Afghanistan in 2016. He returned to the Ministry of Foreign Affairs in The Hague in 2018 to serve as Director Middle East and North Africa.

Van Leeuwen became a counselor to Prime Minister Mark Rutte on foreign affairs and defense issues at his Ministry of General Affairs in October 2020. On 4 December 2023, he was sworn in by King Willem-Alexander as Minister for Foreign Trade and Development Cooperation as a result of the maternity leave of Liesje Schreinemacher, who became the first Dutch minister in history to take such a leave. Van Leeuwen is a member of the conservative-liberal People's Party for Freedom and Democracy (VVD). Schreinemacher returned to the position on 15 April 2024.

Van Leeuwen during his visit to Ukraine, 2024

When Mark Rutte, formerly Prime Minister of the Netherlands, became Secretary General of NATO in October 2024, Van Leeuwen joined him to Brussels as director of his private office.

Political offices
Preceded by Liesje Schreinemacher	Minister for Foreign Trade and Development Cooperation; Acting; 2023–2024	Succeeded by Liesje Schreinemacher
