= Gunay Uslu =

Dutch cultural historian and politician

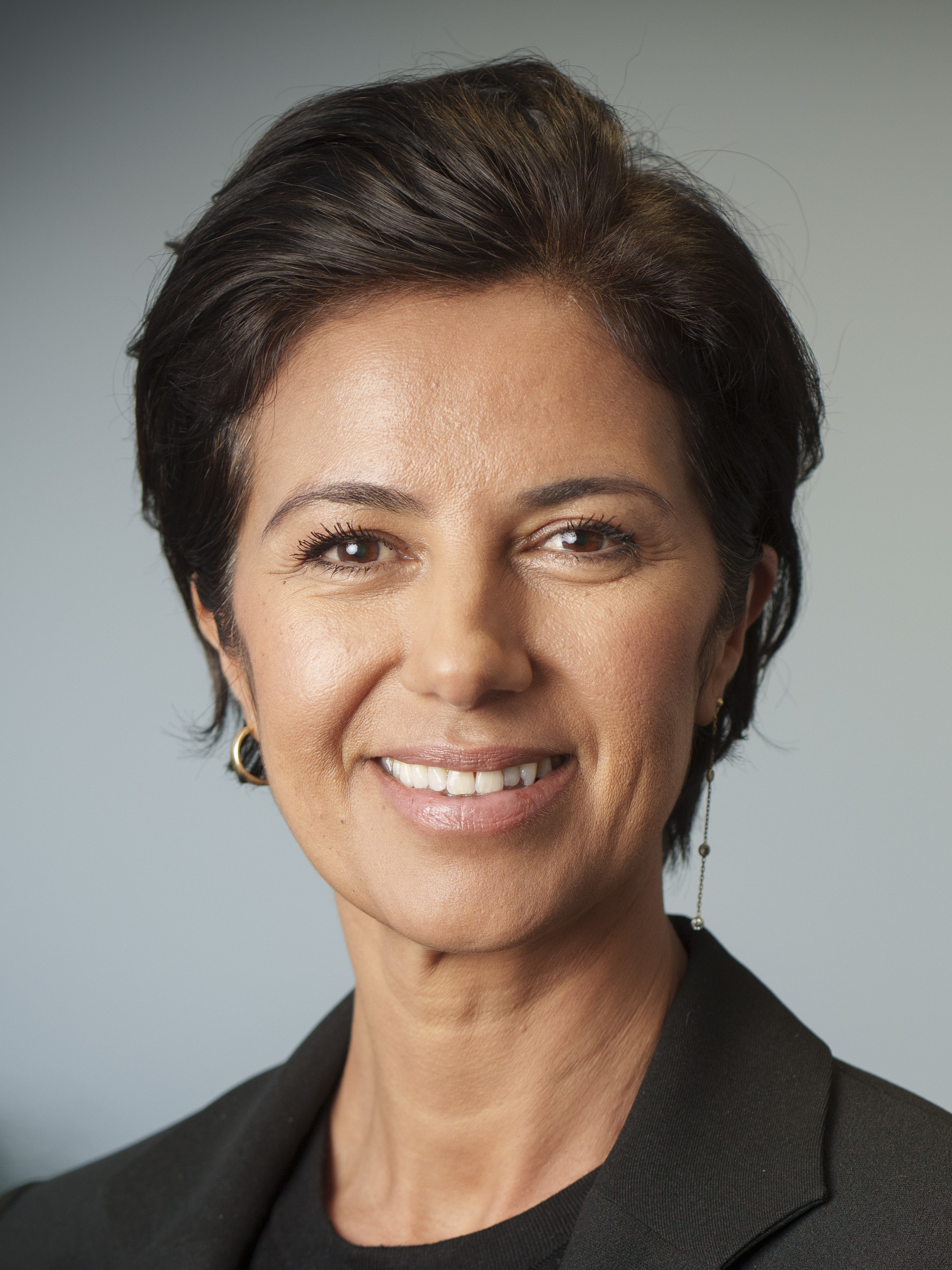
- Uslu in 2022

State Secretary for Culture and Media
- In office 10 January 2022 – 1 December 2023
- Prime Minister: Mark Rutte
- Preceded by: Sander Dekker (2012–2017), Not in use (2017–2022)
- Succeeded by: Ad interim: Robbert Dijkgraaf

Personal details
- Born: Gunay Uslu; 25 October 1972 (age 53) Haarlem, Netherlands
- Party: Democrats 66
- Children: 2
- Education: Amsterdam UAS (P); UvA (P, MA, PhD)
- Occupation: Cultural historian; politician

Gunay Uslu (Turkish: Günay Uslu; born 25 October 1972) is a Dutch cultural historian and politician, who has served as State Secretary for Culture and Media in the fourth Rutte cabinet from 10 January 2022 till 1 December 2023. She is a member of the Democrats 66 (D66) party.

== Early life and education ==
Uslu was born in 1972 in Haarlem, North Holland as the daughter of Turkish immigrants. She attended her secondary education between 1985-1992 at the Montessori Lyceum Amsterdam, where she completed the MAVO and HAVO curricula. After obtaining propaedeutic diplomas in teacher education (history) from the Amsterdam University of Applied Sciences in 1993 and in Dutch law from the University of Amsterdam in 1996, she studied cultural studies at the University of Amsterdam and obtained an MA degree in 2001, specializing in the policy and management of European cultural history. In 2015, she obtained a PhD degree in History, Art History, and Archaeology from the same university.

== Career ==
From 1997 to 1999 and from 2014 to 2020, Uslu held management positions at the Corendon Tourism Group, which was co-founded by her brother Atilay. Between 2001 and 2018, she taught several courses at the University of Amsterdam, including heritage studies, museology and cultural policy. Uslu has also worked for the Rijksmuseum as project manager for education and events and has been the curator of exhibitions at, among others, the Allard Pierson Museum and Amsterdam Museum.

On 10 January 2022, she joined the fourth Rutte cabinet as State Secretary for Culture and Media, on behalf of the Democrats 66. On 30 November 2023, Uslu announced that she would resign from her position as State Secretary and that she would return to Corendon, her brother's company. There, she would work as the CEO per 11 December 2023.

== Electoral history ==
Electoral history of Gunay Uslu
Year	Body	Party	Pos.	Votes	Result		Ref.
Year	Body	Party	Pos.	Votes	Party seats	Individual	Ref.
2023	House of Representatives	Democrats 66	77 (Note: Uslu participated as a lijstduwer.)	658	9	Lost	

== Notes ==
Political offices
Preceded by Sander Dekker	State Secretary for Culture and Media; 2022–2023	Succeeded by Robbert Dijkgraaf (ad interim)
