= Eppo Bruins =

Dutch politician and physicist

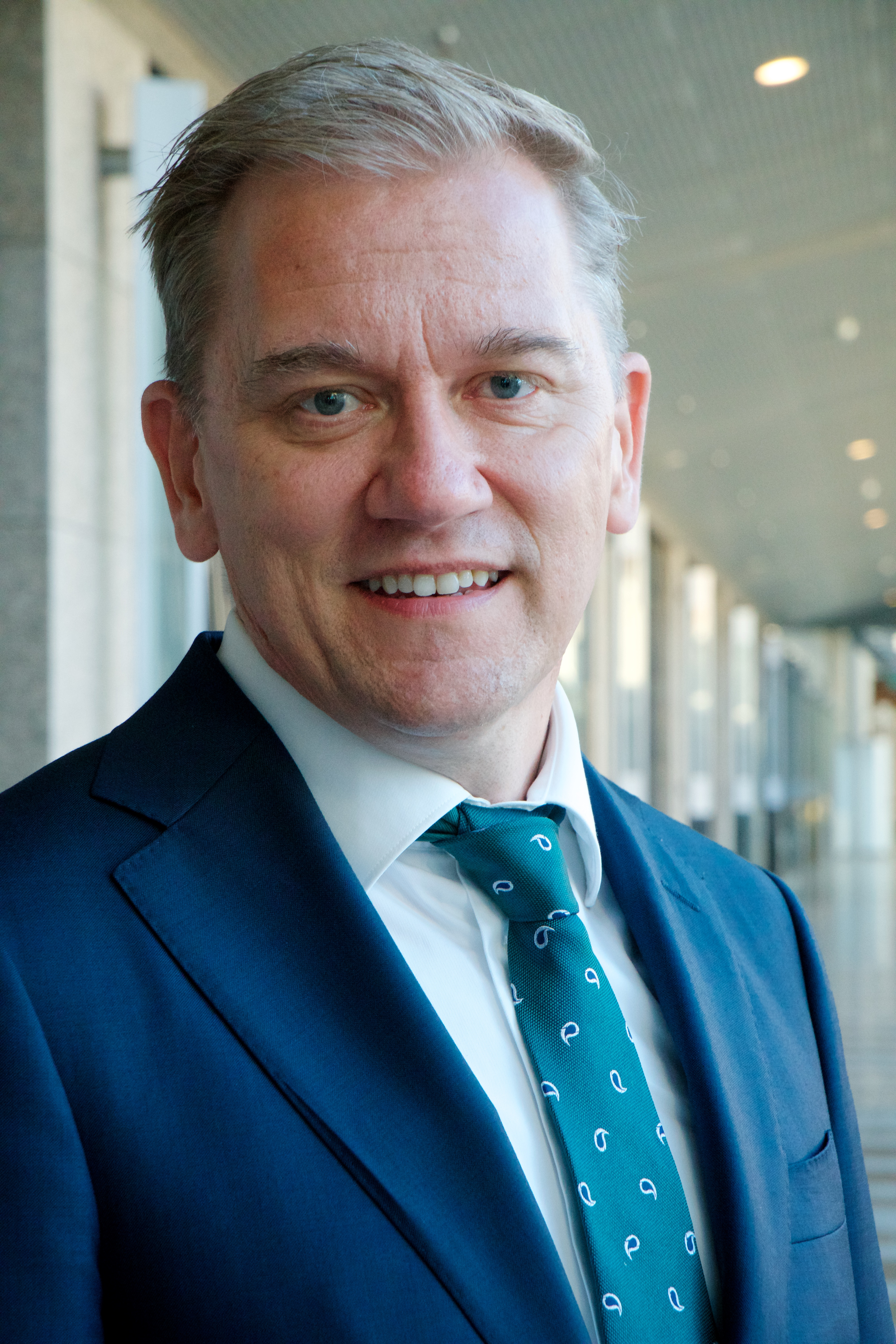
- Bruins in 2018

Minister of Education, Culture and Science
- In office 2 July 2024 – 22 August 2025
- Prime Minister: Dick Schoof
- Preceded by: Robbert Dijkgraaf

Member of the House of Representatives
- In office 2 December 2015 – 31 March 2021

Personal details
- Born: 19 September 1969 (age 56) Apeldoorn, Netherlands
- Party: NSC (2024–present)
- Other political affiliations: CDA (until 2011); CU (2011–2024)
- Children: 2
- Education: Utrecht University (MSc, PhD)

Eppo Egbert Willem Bruins (born 19 September 1969) is a Dutch politician and physicist. He served as Minister of Education, Culture and Science in the Schoof cabinet between July 2024 and August 2025 on behalf of New Social Contract (NSC). He was a member of the House of Representatives for the Christian Union (CU) from 2015 to 2021.

Prior to his service in Parliament, Bruins was director of the Technologiestichting STW from 2007 until 2015. Since 2022, he has chaired the Advisory Council for Science, Technology and Innovation (AWTI).

== Early life and career ==
Bruins was born on 19 September 1969 in Apeldoorn, Gelderland. He attended high school at the preparatory scientific education level at the Myrtus College in his hometown between 1982 and 1987. Bruins subsequently went to Utrecht University, where he graduated with a Master of Science (MSc) degree in physics in 1991. He played the piano at a conservatoire, but he never earned a diploma.

Afterwards, he became a doctoral researcher at Utrecht University funded by Stichting voor Fundamenteel Onderzoek der Materie (Foundation for Fundamental Research on Matter, FOM) for four years. In 1995, he obtained his PhD degree in mathematics and physics from Utrecht University with a thesis entitled The magnetic form factor of the neutron.

Bruins later lived in the United States, where he was a postdoctoral researcher at the Massachusetts Institute of Technology (MIT) from 1995 to 1997. He then returned to the Netherlands, where he was a project coordinator at his former employer FOM between 1997 and 2004, as well as subsequently director of operations of the Leiden Institute of Physics of the Leiden University from 2004 to 2007, before his time as director of Technologiestichting STW between 2007 and 2015.

== Politics ==
Bruins was a member of the Christian Democratic Appeal (CDA). He switched to the more socially conservative Christian Union in 2011, because he felt that the latter party put more emphasis on Christianity. Bruins served as editor-in-chief of the magazine of Christian Union's scientific institute.

In the parliamentary election of 2012, Bruins was placed as number six on the Christian Union list but was not elected. On 2 December 2015, he became member of the House of Representatives, when he replaced former party leader Arie Slob who had resigned as a parliamentarian. He was his party's spokesperson for matters including education, media, and aviation. Bruins opposed the opening of an expanded Lelystad Airport, and he advocated for the reintroduction of a basic grant for students. He was a strong defender of the Constitution's freedom of education. In the parliamentary election of 2021, he was placed seventh on the party list, failing to win re-election.

He became chairperson of the Advisory Council for Science, Technology and Innovation (AWTI) in 2022. In 2023, following the resignation of then party leader Gert-Jan Segers as a parliamentarian, a seat in Parliament was proposed to Bruins, who declined to return. The seat went to Nico Drost instead. Bruins headed the committee that determined the party list of the Christian Union in the November 2023 general election. He was about to become a professor by special appointment at Leiden University, when he joined the Schoof cabinet.

=== Minister of Education, Culture and Science ===
After the PVV, VVD, NSC, and BBB formed the Schoof cabinet, Bruins was sworn in as Minister of Education, Culture and Science on 2 July 2024, succeeding Robbert Dijkgraaf. Bruins serves on behalf of NSC, and he canceled his membership of the Christian Union. Party leader Mirjam Bikker (CU) disapproved of Bruins's nomination. The Schoof cabinet's governing agreement prioritized reading, writing, and arithmetic abilities, as well as addressing the teacher shortage.

The cabinet proposed to cut the yearly education budget by €2 billion. Half of that amount was for higher education, and it would be achieved through lowering the amount of international students, increasing tuition for students exceeding the standard duration, and decreasing funding for research. The coalition agreement included a plan to terminate 1,200 recently created academic positions, but this measure was replaced in the budget proposal by the elimination of research grants. During debates on the 2025 budget, the cuts were criticized by opposition parties, whose support was required to approve the budget in the Senate. Bruins responded that he would not reverse any cuts, and he called them necessary in light of the cabinet's financial priorities. Without his involvement, the four coalition parties negotiated with several centrist and conservative opposition parties, calling themselves the "unholy alliance". In December 2024, an agreement was struck to reduce the €2 billion cut by €750 million.

Bruins continued a bill by Dijkgraaf aimed at reducing the number of international students. The bill would limit the proportion of English-taught content to one third within each bachelor's degree program, with the remainder to be taught in Dutch. Exceptions would be made for regional circumstances, labor market needs, international uniqueness, and international positioning. Bruins intended to define the latter two grounds more narrowly than his predecessor.

On 3 June 2025, Schoof's cabinet collapsed after the Party for Freedom pulled out of the coalition. Schoof remained as a caretaker until snap elections are held.

== Personal life ==
He is married to Marlies, and they have two sons. As of 2024, he lived in Ermelo.

Bruins had an irreligious upbringing. He played piano in the backup band of a Christian choir, and he has told that he converted to Christianity at the age of 18 after he was asked to sing "And in That Day" by Adrian Snell. Bruins initially was a member of the Reformed Association in the Protestant Church in the Netherlands before becoming a Baptist. Bruins became the second Baptist member of the House of Representatives after Janmarc Lenards. An evangelist, he is involved in the Christian Hadderech movement, which focuses on missionary work among Jews. Bruins regularly visited the House of Representatives after his departure as an informal religious counselor along with a member of Justice House of Prayer, praying for members of parliament, and he blessed the temporary house of parliament, when the Binnenhof was closed due to a renovation.

== Electoral history ==
Electoral history of Eppo Bruins
Year	Body	Party	Pos.	Votes	Result		Ref.
Year	Body	Party	Pos.	Votes	Party seats	Individual	Ref.
2024	European Parliament	Christian Union	15 (Note: Bruins participated as a lijstduwer.)	1,075	0	Lost	

== Notes ==
Political offices
Preceded by Robbert Dijkgraaf	Minister of Education, Culture and Science; 2024–2025	Succeeded by Gouke Moes
