= Gouke Moes =

Dutch politician (born 1991)

Minister of Education, Culture and Science
- In office 5 September 2025 – 22 February 2026
- Cabinet: Schoof
- Preceded by: Eppo Bruins

Member of the Provincial Executive of Groningen
- In office 19 March 2025 – 5 September 2025

Member of the Provincial Council of Groningen
- In office 29 March 2023 – 19 March 2025

Personal details
- Born: 17 December 1991 (age 34)
- Party: Farmer–Citizen Movement
- Children: 3
- Occupation: Politician

Gouke Moes (Dutch: [ˈɣʌukə ˈmus]; born 17 December 1991) is a Dutch politician of the Farmer–Citizen Movement (BBB), who served as the minister of education, culture and science between September 2025 and February 2026.

== Career ==
He was a metalworker before he trained to become a teacher between 2014 and 2018. Starting in 2021, he taught technical education at the Campus VO Eemsdelta secondary school in Appingedam. He became a member of the Farmer–Citizen Movement the same year, and he was elected to the Provincial Council of Groningen in the March 2023 provincial elections, serving as parliamentary leader. He was appointed to the Provincial Executive of Groningen in March 2025, where he was responsible for energy, digital infrastructure, internal organisation, defence, and sport.

On 5 September 2025, he joined the demissionary Schoof cabinet as minister of education, culture and science, succeeding Eppo Bruins whose party left the cabinet. Media coverage centred around his 2024 response to the vandalisation of a rainbow crossing with swastikas. Moes denounced the political polarisation "from both sides" on social media. He later said that he should have formulated his statement differently.

== Personal life ==
As of 2025, Moes was married, and he had three children.

Political offices
Preceded by Eppo Bruins	Minister of Education, Culture and Science; 2025–2026	Succeeded by Rianne Letschert
