= Inge van Dijk =

Dutch politician (born 1975)

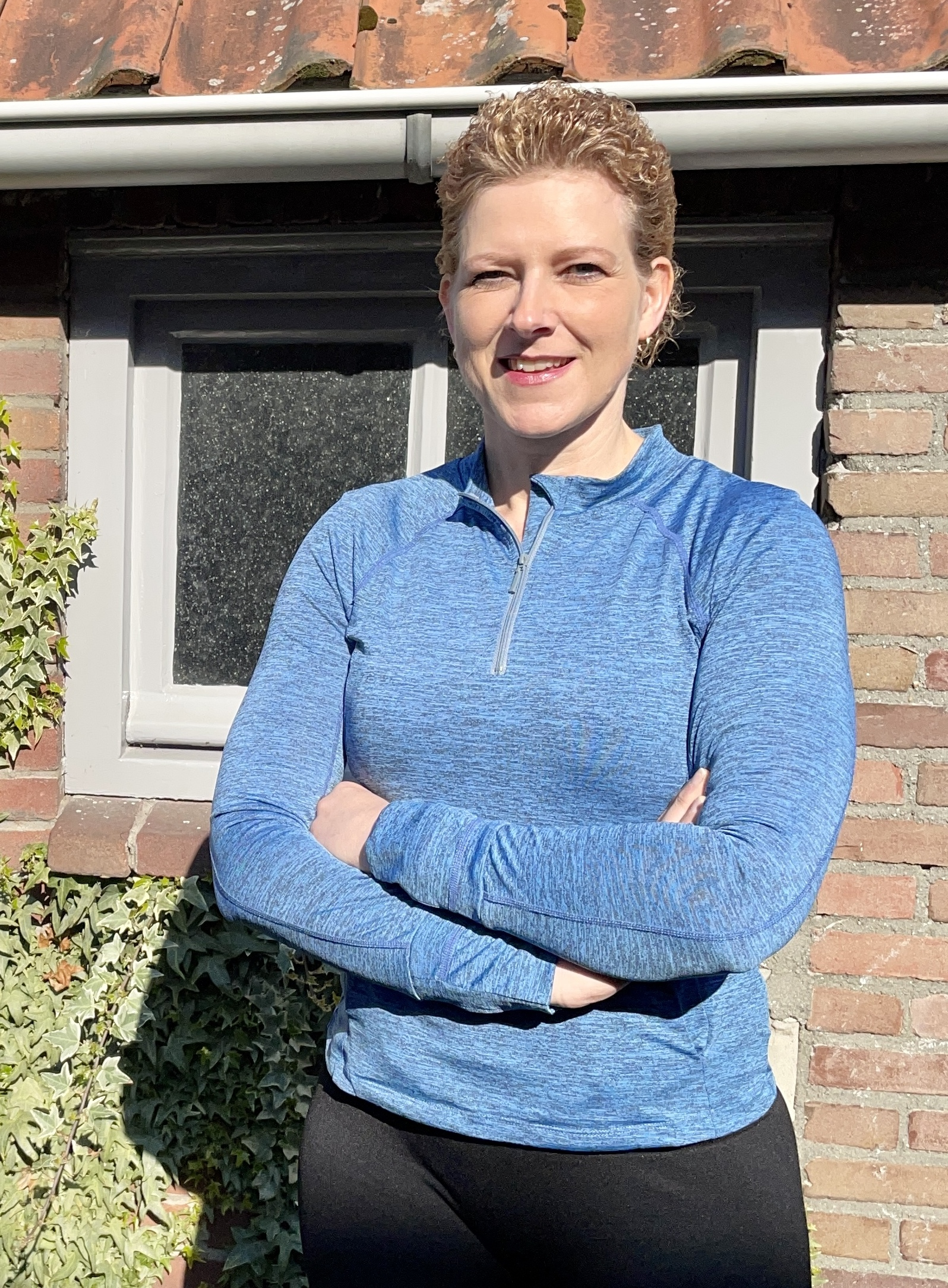

Member of the House of Representatives
- Incumbent
- Assumed office 31 March 2021

Alderwoman in Gemert-Bakel
- In office 9 May 2018 – 18 March 2021
- Succeeded by: Bart Claassen

Member of the Gemert-Bakel municipal council
- In office 2001 – 9 May 2018

Personal details
- Born: I. van Dijk; 6 May 1975 (age 51) Helmond, Netherlands
- Party: Christian Democratic Appeal
- Education: HAS University of Applied Sciences

Inge van Dijk (born 6 May 1975) is a Dutch politician, serving as a member of the House of Representatives since the 2021 general election. She represents the political party Christian Democratic Appeal (CDA).

Before becoming an MP, Van Dijk had been a member of the Gemert-Bakel municipal council between 2001 and 2018, being her party's lijsttrekker in two elections. She became an alderwoman in 2018 and has also chaired CDA Brabant between 2015 and 2020.

== Early life and education ==
Van Dijk was born in the North Brabant city Helmond in 1975, and she moved at age one to the nearby village Bakel. Her father worked as a gas fitter. She attended the Helmond high school Dr. Knippenbergcollege and studied business administration at HAS University of Applied Sciences in 's-Hertogenbosch in the years 1994–99.

== Career ==
She took a job at Rabobank as internal account manager business relations in 1999 and would continue working for that company until she became an alderwoman in 2018. She served at several branches and at the national office in several positions including product manager. While working for Rabobank, she was a member of the Gemert-Bakel municipal council and volunteered at a number of local organizations including handball club Acritas, where she was a trainer, coach, and board member until 2014.

Van Dijk joined the municipal council in 2001, a few years after the municipalities Gemert and Bakel had merged. She has told that she and her father had campaigned against the reorganization and that she had decided to become politically active because of that experience. She became the CDA's lijsttrekker during the 2014 Gemert-Bakel municipal election, having been eighth on the party list in the previous election. She succeeded Harrie Verkampen, who had been leading the party in Gemert-Bakel for several decades. Her party managed to bring an end to a period of four years without having a plurality in the council. In November 2015, Van Dijk also became the chair of CDA Brabant.

She was again her party's lijsttrekker during the 2018 municipal election. Her party again received a plurality of votes, and Van Dijk vacated her council seat in May to become a full-time alderwoman responsible for economic and sport policy. Because of this position, she quit her job at Rabobank. In July 2019, Van Dijk survived a motion of no confidence. Her coalition was against plans to build a new swimming pool due to the financial risk involved and instead wanted to renovate an existing one. Under her leadership as chair of CDA Brabant, the party formed a coalition with, among other parties, the populist Forum for Democracy in 2020. A majority of CDA Brabant members (56%) had supported the coalition, that was controversial due to ideological disagreements, in a referendum. The previous coalition had collapsed because the CDA had left it. In May 2020, one of the four alderwomen of Gemert-Bakel left, and Van Dijk's portfolio changed; she also became responsible for finances and real estate and surrendered sport policy.

=== House of Representatives (2021–present) ===
Van Dijk ran for member of parliament during the 2021 general election, being placed fourth on the CDA's party list. In November 2020 – shortly after her position had been announced – she stepped down as CDA Brabant chair. She was elected, receiving 16,851 preference votes, and was sworn into office on 31 March. Van Dijk was the CDA's spokesperson for economic affairs, the interior, finances, and sports. In the House, she proposed to provide €10 million per year in funding from the national government for local political parties next to the already existing €27 million in funding for national parties. She also wanted to spend part of a fund from the European Union on providing free Internet for people with a low income. In 2023, Van Dijk complained the government was treating sports clubs and other associations too much like commercial businesses, threatening their existence, and she stressed their importance for society. She suggested several measures to aid the organizations such as exempting them from sales tax, increasing the compensation for volunteers, and having the government pay the first year of membership for new inhabitants.

Van Dijk received a second term in a November 2023 snap election as the CDA's fourth candidate. Her areas of focus changed to finances, economic affairs, government, sports, and social affairs. In November 2024, Van Dijk said her party, along with two other Christian parties, would only support the Schoof cabinet's 2025 Tax Plan if they would implement three changes, including reversing a proposed sales tax increase on hotel stays, sports, culture, books, and newspapers from 9% to 21%. As opposition parties held a majority in the Senate, Minister of Finance Eelco Heinen agreed to the requested concessions, with the exception of the reversal of the sales tax increase on hotel stays. In October 2024, the House unanimously adopted a motion by Van Dijk calling on the government to prevent buy now, pay later services from becoming available in physical stores. The cabinet supported the objective, but it responded that no measures could be taken pending upcoming European Union legislation on the topic.

=== House committee assignments ===
==== 2021–2023 term ====
- Committee for Digital Affairs
- Committee for Economic Affairs and Climate Policy
- Committee for Finance
- Committee for the Interior
- Committee for Kingdom Relations
- Public Expenditure committee
- Procedure Committee

==== 2023–present term ====
- Committee for the Interior
- Committee for Economic Affairs
- Public Expenditure committee
- Committee for Finance
- Procedure Committee
- Committee for Social Affairs and Employment

== Personal life ==
Van Dijk has been living in the North Brabant village of Gemert since 2020, where she lives with her partner and three stepchildren. Before that, she resided in Bakel.

Her former home in Bakel became the subject of municipal politics in 2019, because the zoning regulations only allowed the building and the neighboring building to be used as homes accompanying farms. She had tried to change those regulations at the Council of State, but a nearby farmer filed an objection fearing stricter environmental regulations. The municipal council eventually changed the zoning regulations such that both houses could be used as homes without farms.

== Electoral history ==
Electoral history of Inge van Dijk
Year	Body	Party	Pos.	Votes	Result		Ref.
Year	Body	Party	Pos.	Votes	Party seats	Individual	Ref.
2021	House of Representatives	Christian Democratic Appeal	4	16,851	15	Won	
2023	House of Representatives	Christian Democratic Appeal	4	8,701	5	Won	
2025	House of Representatives	Christian Democratic Appeal	4	27,262	18	Won	

== Decorations ==
- Order of Orange-Nassau
  - Member (26 April 2019)
