= De Rips =

- Village
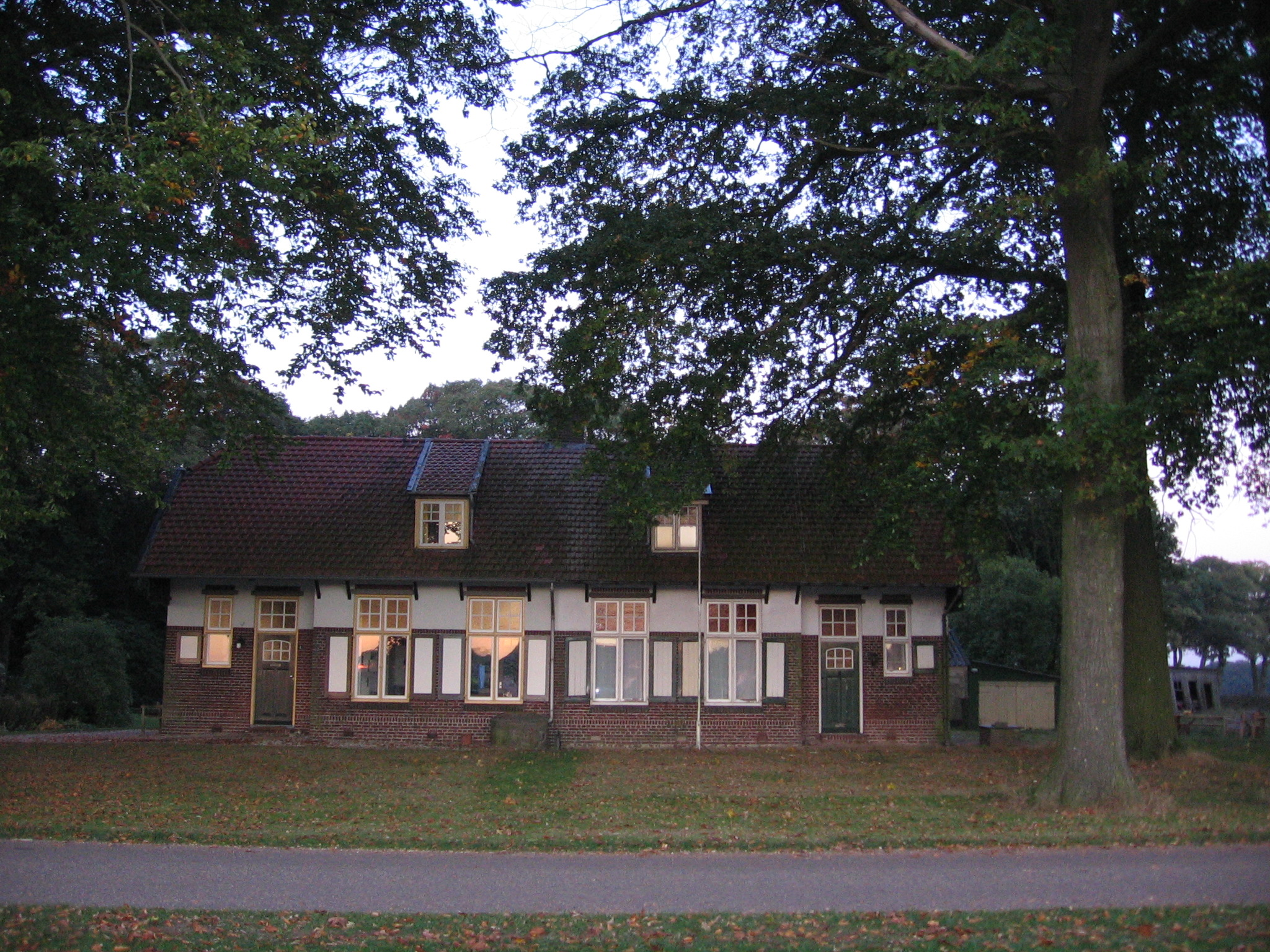
- Houses in De Rips

- Location in the province of North Brabant in the Netherlands De Rips (Netherlands)
- Coordinates: 51°33′9″N 5°48′27″E
- Country: Netherlands
- Province: North Brabant
- Municipality: Gemert-Bakel
- Established: 1921

Area
  - Total: 25.57 km^{2} (9.87 sq mi)
- Elevation: 28 m (92 ft)

Population (2021)
  - Total: 1,160
  - Density: 45.4/km^{2} (117/sq mi)
- Time zone: UTC+1 (CET)
  - Summer (DST): UTC+2 (CEST)
- Postal code: 5764
- Dialing code: 0493

De Rips is a village east of Helmond and Eindhoven in southern part of the Netherlands. Until the late 1990s it formed the municipality of Bakel and Milheeze alongside Milheeze and Bakel, but in 1997 it was forced to merge with the larger Gemert municipality.

The village was first mentioned in 1544 as Ripse Paal, and refers to a border pole close to the stream Rips.

De Rips was located in the Peel, a large heath area. In 1871, 400 hectares (990 acres) was bought by Cornelis Carp who built a farm in 1875 on land which was named after the border pole. The land was cultivated and more farms were built. The village was founded in 1921 by the Heidemij (nowadays: Arcadis) as a planned settlement with church, school and houses.

== Gallery ==
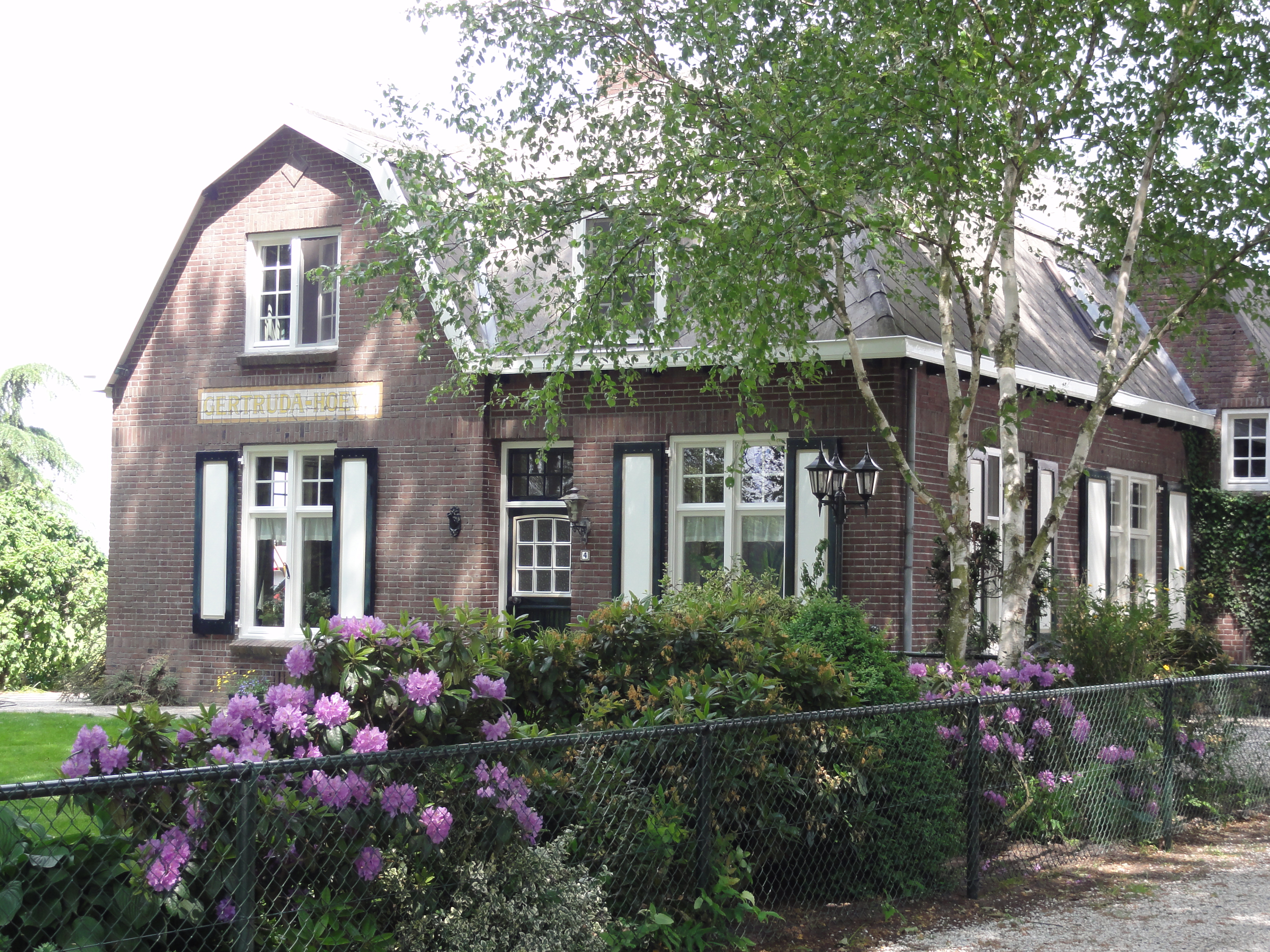
Farm in De Rips

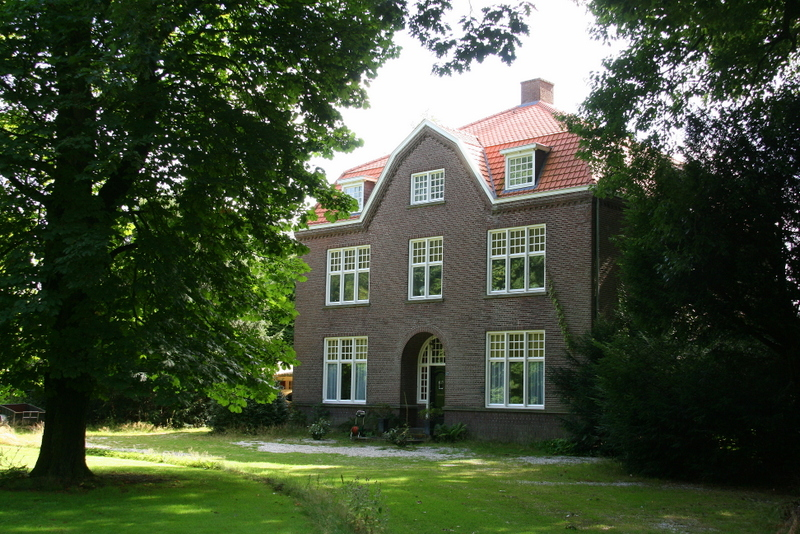
Clergy house

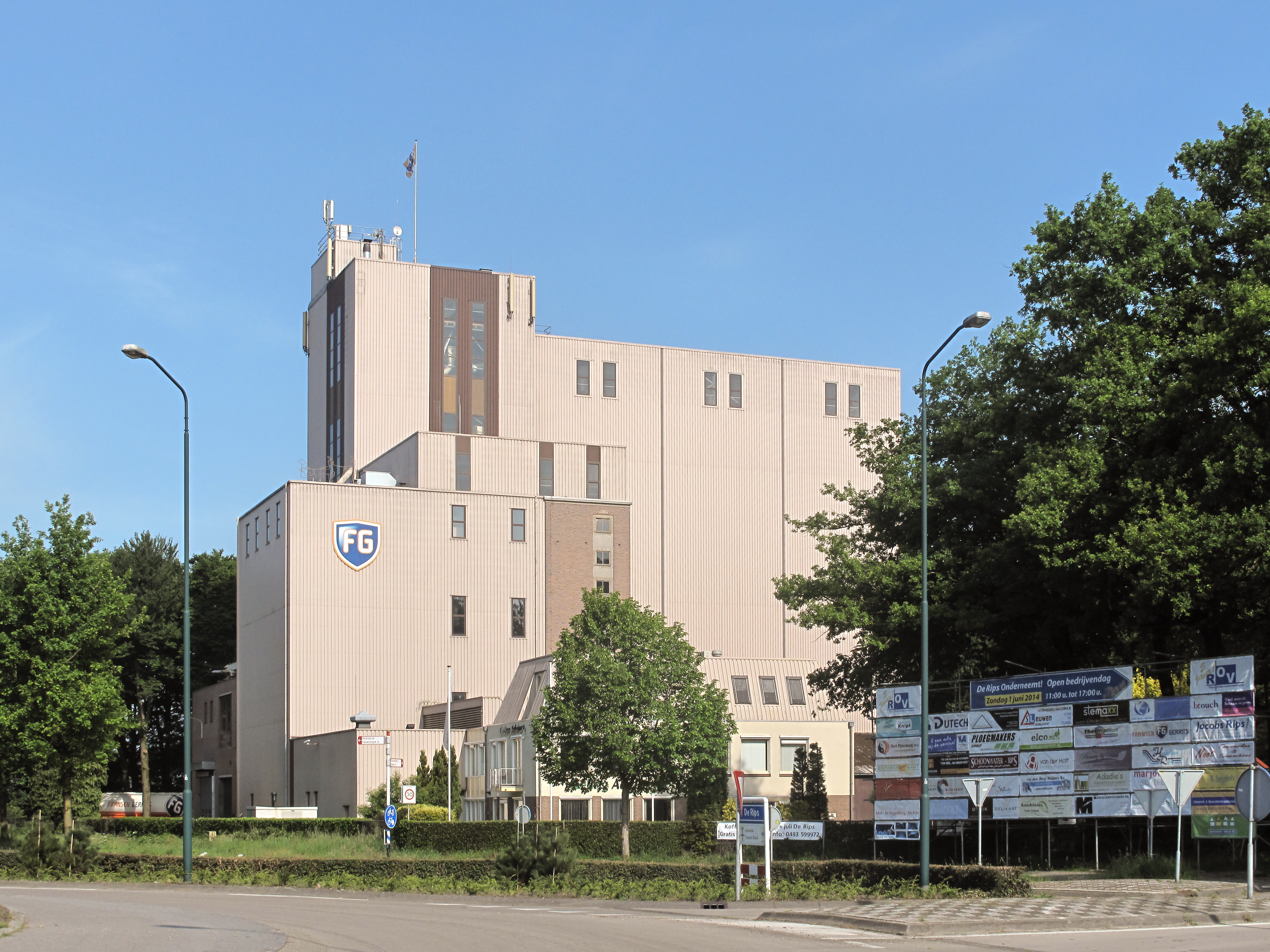
Factory
