= Bakel =

Bakel may refer to:

== Places ==
- Bakel Department, Senegal
- Bakel, Senegal, a town in the eastern part of Senegal, capital of the Department
- Bakel, Netherlands, a village in southern part of the Netherlands
- Bakel en Milheeze, a former municipality in the Dutch province of North Brabant, now part of Gemert-Bakel
- Bekal, in Kasaragod, India

== People ==
- John Bakel (born 1972), American fashion designer

== See also ==
- Gemert-Bakel, Netherlands
- Kees Bakels (born 1945), Dutch conductor
