= Hoeven, Gemert-Bakel =

Hoeven
- Hamlet
- Location in the province of North Brabant in the Netherlands Hoeven (Netherlands)
- Coordinates: 51°29′54″N 5°47′35″E
- Country: Netherlands
- Province: North Brabant
- Municipality: Gemert-Bakel
- Time zone: UTC+1 (CET)
  - Summer (DST): UTC+2 (CEST)
- Postal code: 5763
- Dialing code: 0492

Hoeven is a hamlet in southern Netherlands. It is located in the Dutch province of North Brabant, in the municipality of Gemert-Bakel, about 1 km southeast of the village of Milheeze and about 4 km north of the village Deurne.

Hoeven is not a statistical entity, and the postal authorities have placed it under Milheeze. It has no place name signs and consists of about 30 houses.

It was first mentioned between 1838 and 1857 as Hoeven, and means "piece of land".
