= Arnoldus Arlenius =

Dutch humanist philosopher, scholar, bookseller and poet (c. 1510 – 1582)

Arnoldus Arlenius Peraxylus, (c. 1510 – 1582), born Arndt or Arnout van Eyndhouts or van Eynthouts, also known as Arnoud de Lens, was a Dutch humanist philosopher and poet.

He was born in Aarle, near Helmond, (although some accounts say 's-Hertogenbosch), North Brabant, in the Netherlands, at that time part of the possessions of the Habsburgs. He studied under Macropedius and later travelled to Paris, and Ferrara and studied at the University of Bologna for five years, becoming a first-rate Greek scholar and supporting himself by bookselling and acting as a scout for the printers of Basel, arranging the publication of books such as Caelius Rhodiginus's Lectiones antiquae.

In 1542 he travelled to Venice, where he became librarian to the Spanish ambassador, Diego Hurtado de Mendoza, finding new texts and organising the transcription of documents, work which involved him in travelling to Frankfurt and Florence. In 1543 he met Conrad Gessner who visited him in Venice. He also catalogued Mendoza's collection of Greek manuscripts. Working with manuscripts found in Mendoza's substantial library, he produced in 1544 the first printed Greek version of the works of Josephus. This was published by Hieronymus Froben in Basel, and for many years was the basis of all existing translations from the Greek. In addition, he was responsible for the publication of important early editions of Lycophron (Basel, 1546) and Niccolò Perotti's Latin translation of Polybius (Basel, 1549). His Greek-Latin Lexicon was published in Venice in 1546.

He later worked as a corrector for the printer Lorenzo Torrentino and obtained books and manuscripts for Johann Jakob Fugger. In 1556 he was responsible for the publication in Basel of an edition of Plato's works, based on the 1534 edition by the scholar Simon Grynaeus, which he personally corrected with the assistance of manuscripts of Plato which he had collected in Italy. This edition is described by the classicist Myles Burnyeat as "one of the most barbarously ligatured ever put into print."

== Sources ==
- Charles Anthon, A Manual of Greek Literature from the Earliest Authentic Periods to the Close of Byzantine Era (New York, 1853)
- Anthony Hobson, Renaissance Book Collecting: Jean Grolier and Diego Hurtado de Mendoza, their Books and Bindings: pp 72–74.
- Jenny, B.R. ‘Arlenius in Basel’, Basler Zeitschrift für Geschichte und Alterthumskunde, 64 (1964), 5–45.
