= Jo van Ammers-Küller =

Dutch writer (1884–1966)

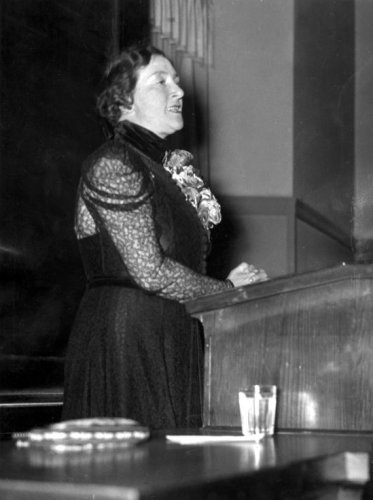
Jo van Ammers-Küller (1937)

Johanna van Ammers-Küller (13 August 1884, Noordeloos – 23 January 1966, Bakel) was a Dutch writer. She was one of the most successful European female writers in the interwar period, though her reputation suffered as a result of her collaboration during World War II.

== Life ==
Johanna Küller grew up in Delft, the only child of middle-class parents. By the age of 18 she was engaged to Rudolf van Ammers, an engineer, and she married him when she was 21. He became head of the Municipal Lighting Works in Leiden.

De opstandigen (The Rebel Generation) published in 1925 is her most famous work. She describes the fights of three generations of women of the same family to be the equal of men among the limitations imposed by the Calvinist environment they live in.

== Works ==
- Maskerade, 1919
- The house of joy: a story of stage-life in Holland, 1924. Translated by H. van Wyhe.
- The rebel generation, 1925. Translated by M. W. Hoper from the Dutch De opstandigen : een familie-roman in drie boeken.
- Tantalus, a novel, 1930. Translated by G. J. Renier and Irene Clephane from the Dutch Tantalus, 1928
- No surrender, 1930. Translated by W. D. Robson-Scott from the Dutch De Opstandigen. 2. Vrouwenkruistocht.
- Jenny Heysten's career, 1930. Translated by H. van Wyhe.
- The apple and Eve, 1933. Translated by Mrs C. B. Bodde from Der Apfel und Eva.
- The house of Tavelinck 1938. Translated by A. v. A. van Duym and Edmund Gilligan from the Dutch Heeren, knechten en vrouwen
- Elzelina : de geschiedenis van een Hollandsche vrouw in de jaren 1776–1845, 1940.
- Ma: een familieroman uit de jaren 1871–1901, 1942.
