= Hoeven (disambiguation) =

Hoeven may refer to:

- Charles B. Hoeven (1895–1980), American politician
- John Hoeven (born 1957), United States Senator from North Dakota

Hoeven may also refer to several locations in the Netherlands:

- Hoeven, a town in Halderberge
- Hoeven, Gemert-Bakel
- Hoeven, Sint Anthonis
- Hoeven, Limburg
