= René Paardekooper =

Dutch footballer (1987–2026)

Personal information
- Date of birth: 17 April 1987
- Place of birth: Gemert, Netherlands
- Date of death: 1 May 2026 (aged 39)
- Place of death: Gemert, Netherlands
- Height: 1.87 m (6 ft 2 in)
- Position: Centre-back

Youth career
- 1993–2003: VV Gemert
- 2003–2005: Helmond Sport

Senior career*
Years	Team	Apps	(Gls)
2005–2010	Helmond Sport	81	(0)
2010–2015	VV Gemert		
- * Club domestic league appearances and goals

René Paardekooper (17 April 1987 – 1 May 2026) was a Dutch professional footballer who played as a centre-back

== Early life ==
René Paardekooper was born on 17 April 1987 in Gemert, North Brabant. He joined local club VV Gemert at the age of seven, progressing through the youth teams before being scouted by Helmond Sport during his time in the under-17s.

== Career ==
=== Helmond Sport ===
Paardekooper made his professional debut on 16 September 2005, coming on as a substitute in injury time for Appie Yahia in a 0–0 draw at Cambuur in the Eerste Divisie under manager Gerald Vanenburg. He signed his first contract the following year, in 2006, and established himself as a regular starter under the successive managements of Jan Poortvliet and Jurgen Streppel. During this period he also studied at the Academy of Physical Education (ALO) in Tilburg, combining his professional career with his studies. He made more than 80 competitive appearances for the club before his contract was not renewed in 2010.

=== VV Gemert ===
Paardekooper returned to VV Gemert in 2010, rejoining a club that had just won the Sunday Hoofdklasse championship and was beginning its first season in the Topklasse. A year into his return, in 2011, he was diagnosed with Hodgkin lymphoma. After an extended period of treatment and rehabilitation, he made an emotional return to the first team in the spring of 2013. In the following season he made 11 appearances, five as a starter, but the disease had returned and he retired definitively from football in 2015 at the age of 28.

== After football ==
Following his retirement, Paardekooper became media adviser for local outlet Gemert Media in 2016.

== Death ==
Paardekooper died on 1 May 2026 at the age of 39, from the long-term consequences of Hodgkin lymphoma, first diagnosed in 2011. Helmond Sport and VV Gemert both issued tributes.
