= HAS University of Applied Sciences =

University of applied sciences in 's-Hertogenbosch, Netherlands

Coordinates: 51°41′10.96″N 5°17′08.06″E

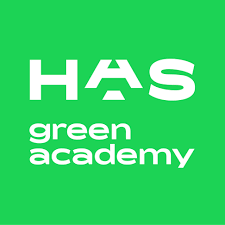
- Motto: The University of agribusiness, food and living environment
- Type: Public
- Established: 1947
- Chairman: Dick Pouwels
- Administrative staff: 450
- Students: 3400
- Location: 's-Hertogenbosch and Venlo, Netherlands
- Website: http://www.hasuniversity.nl/

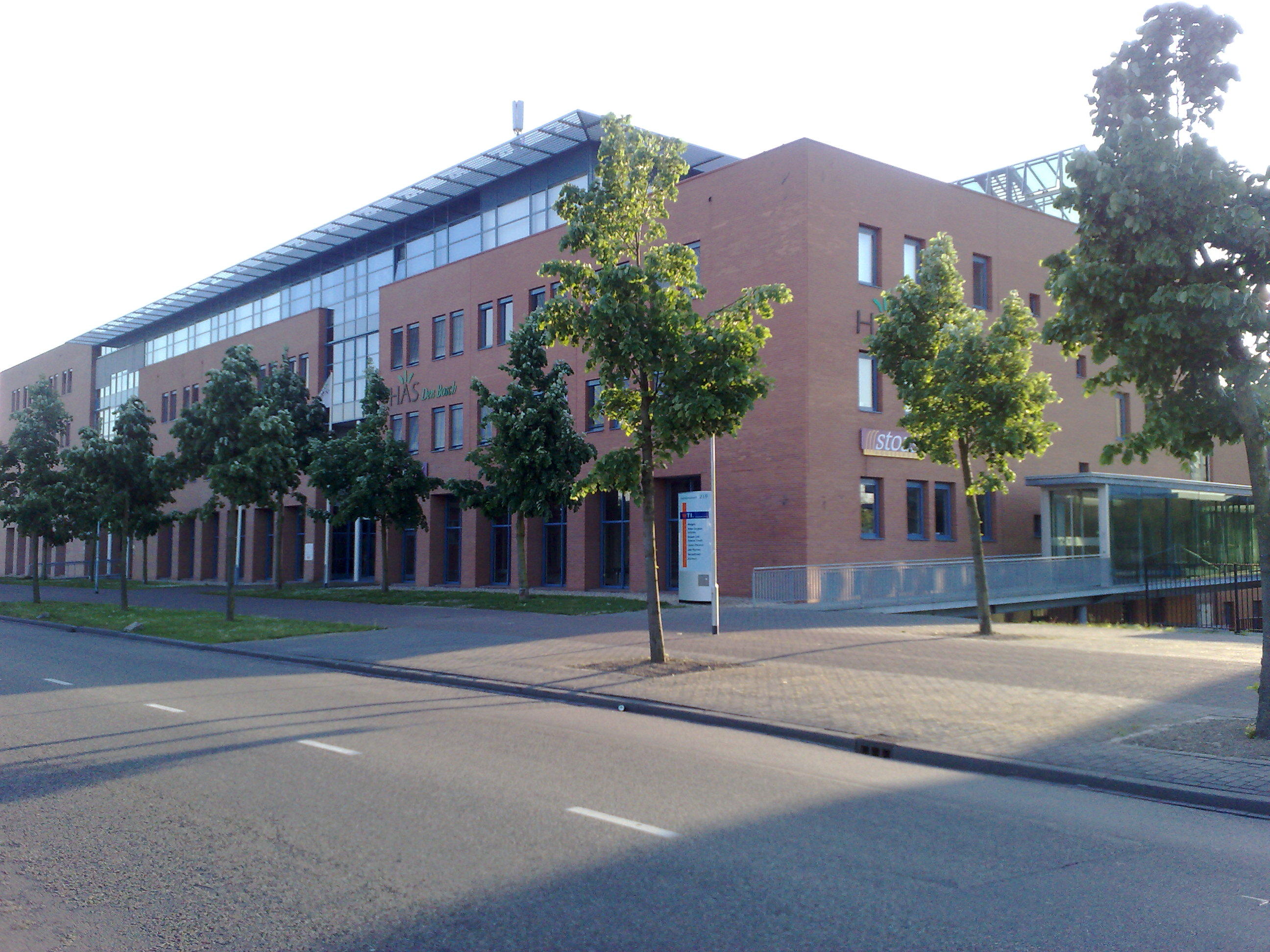
HAS University of Applied Sciences building's-Hertogenbosch

HAS University of Applied Sciences (Dutch: HAS Green Academy) is an independent university of applied sciences, specialising in food, agriculture, horticulture, nature and environment. It is located in 's-Hertogenbosch, the regional capital of North Brabant and Venlo, Limburg. All bachelor programmes are accredited by the Dutch Flemish Accreditation Organisation. In 2017 there were around 3400 students enrolled at HAS University of Applied Sciences.

== History ==
On 13 October 1947 MLS (middelbare landbouwschool) was opened in Roermond, and followed a year later by the MZS (middelbare landbouwschool). In 1956 the higher horticulture school was opened in Nijmegen, which became part of HAS (hogere agrarische scholen gemeenschap) which formed the KNBTB (Koninklijke Nederlandse Boeren- en Tuindersbond) in 's-Hertogenbosch, North Brabant in 1962. This was later renamed to HAS University of Applied Sciences. In 2013 HAS University of Applied Sciences opened their 2nd location in Venlo, Limburg.

== Studyprogrammes ==
HAS University of Applied Sciences offers 9 Dutch-taught bachelor programmes and 3 English-taught Bachelor programmes.

HAS University of Applied Sciences
Dutch Courses	Bachelor Courses	Animal Husbandry	Food Innovation	Spatial & Environmental Planning
Dutch Courses	Bachelor Courses	Horticulture & Arable Farming	Food Technology	Environmental Science
Dutch Courses	Bachelor Courses	Business Administration & Agri-foodbusiness		Applied Biology
Dutch Courses	Bachelor Courses			Earth, Data-analysis & Visualization
English Courses	Bachelor Courses	Horticulture & Business Management	International Food & Agribusiness
English Courses	Bachelor Courses	Business Management in Agriculture & Food

== Awards ==
- 2016 Elsevier 'Best University of Applied Sciences of the Netherlands' award
- 2017 Keuzegids HBO: 2nd best University of Applied Sciences (medium size)
- 2018 Keuzegids HBO: 2nd best University of Applied Sciences (medium size)

== HAS Training and Consultancy ==
HAS Training and Consultancy (Dutch: HAS Kennistransfer en Bedrijfsopleidingen), a partner of HAS University of Applied Sciences, offers research and consultancy services, training programs, courses and SPOC's for business and government organizations in the agribusiness and the food sector. HAS Training and Consultancy allows international students of HAS University of Applied Sciences to participate in research as part of their graduation projects, under the supervision of a consultant.
