= Lawrence Torrentinus =

- Born: 1499; Gemert, Habsburg Netherlands
- Died: 12 February 1563 (aged 63–64); Florence, Grand Duchy of Tuscany
- Occupation: Typographer, bookseller
- Movement: Renaissance

Lawrence Torrentinus, also known as Lorenzo Torrentino, Laurentius Torrentinus, Laurens van den Bleeck (1499–1563) was a Dutch-Italian humanist and famous typographer and printer for Cosimo I de' Medici, Duke of Florence

== Biography ==
Laurentius Torrentinus was born as Laurens van den Bleeck in Gemert, (Northern Brabant, the Netherlands) as a member of a prosperous family. He probably studied at the municipal Latin School in 's-Hertogenbosch, where Macropedius was teaching. After that, Torrentinus must have worked for printers and booksellers in Antwerp, Basel, Lyon and Venice. Since 1532-1533 he lived in Bologna. Here he was a bookseller together with his fellow countryman, the great Greek scholar Arnoldus Arlenius, operating under the business name "Libreria del Thodesco".

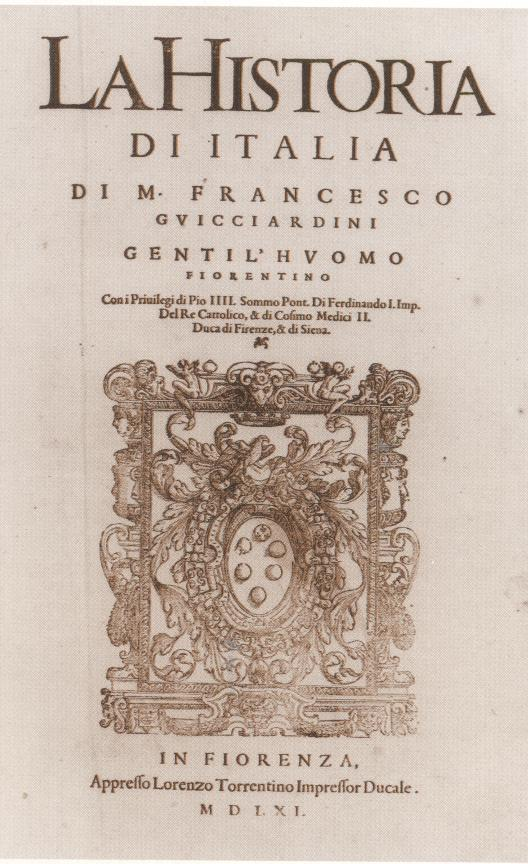
Title page of Francesco Guicciardini's 'La Historia di Italia', Printed by Lawrence Torrentinus (Florence 1561).

Their business was near the San Andrea della Scuole chapel in the centre of Bologna. They imported Latin and Greek books from France and Germany and sold books all over Italy and beyond. Moreover, they were brokers in manuscripts: they made contacts between manuscript owners and authors on the one hand and printers and publishers on the other hand. Torrentinus, who was called Lorenzo Torrentino in Italy, married Nicolosia de Amicis from Bologna on July 14, 1543. He was invited to Florence by the Duke Cosimo de' Medici in 1546. In 1547 he opened his press in Garbo close to the Church of S. Romolo. Being the Duke's printer, Torrentino produced as many as 275 different books.

Among them were works of authors such as Alberti, Giovio, Guicciardini, Camillo and Vasari. Torrentino's company flourished and it offered works of high quality. One of his most famous publications was the Digesta, the codification of Roman Law, in 1553.

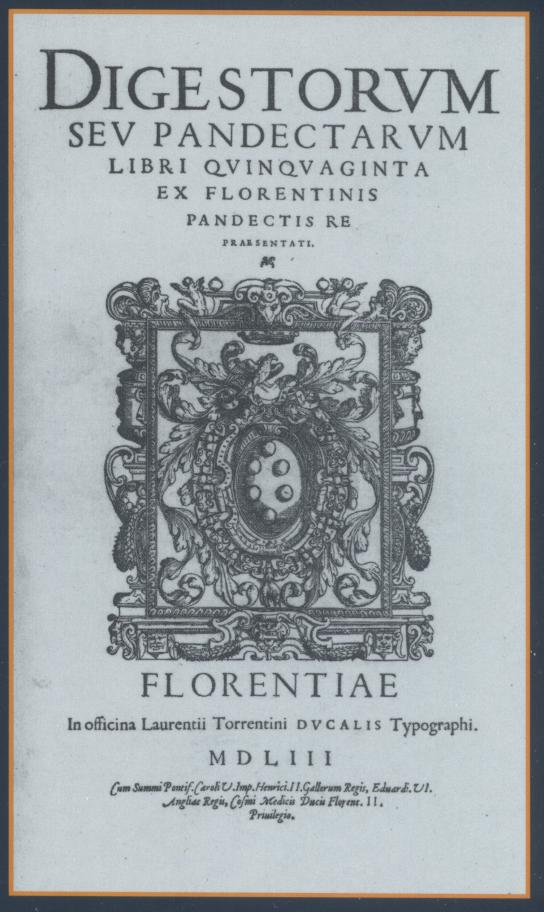
Title page of Digestorum seu Pandectarum, etc. Printed by Lawrence Torrentinus (Florence 1553).

Between 1554 and 1555 he worked in Pescia. His first wife died between 1552 and 1557. On September 19, 1558, Torrentino married Lucretia Albertinelli, a widow from Florence. In 1562 he was summoned in Mondovì to manage and direct the typography foundry there by will of the Duke Emannuel Filiberto. Lorenzo Torrentino died in Florence on February 2, 1563. The press was later on managed by his sons Leonardo, Romolo and Bonaventura. Lorenzo Torrentino contributed to the interchanging of ideas north and south of the Alps. Moreover, he contributed to the development of the Tuscan and Italian language.
