= Caelius Rhodiginus =

15th/16th century Venetian writer and professor in Greek and Latin

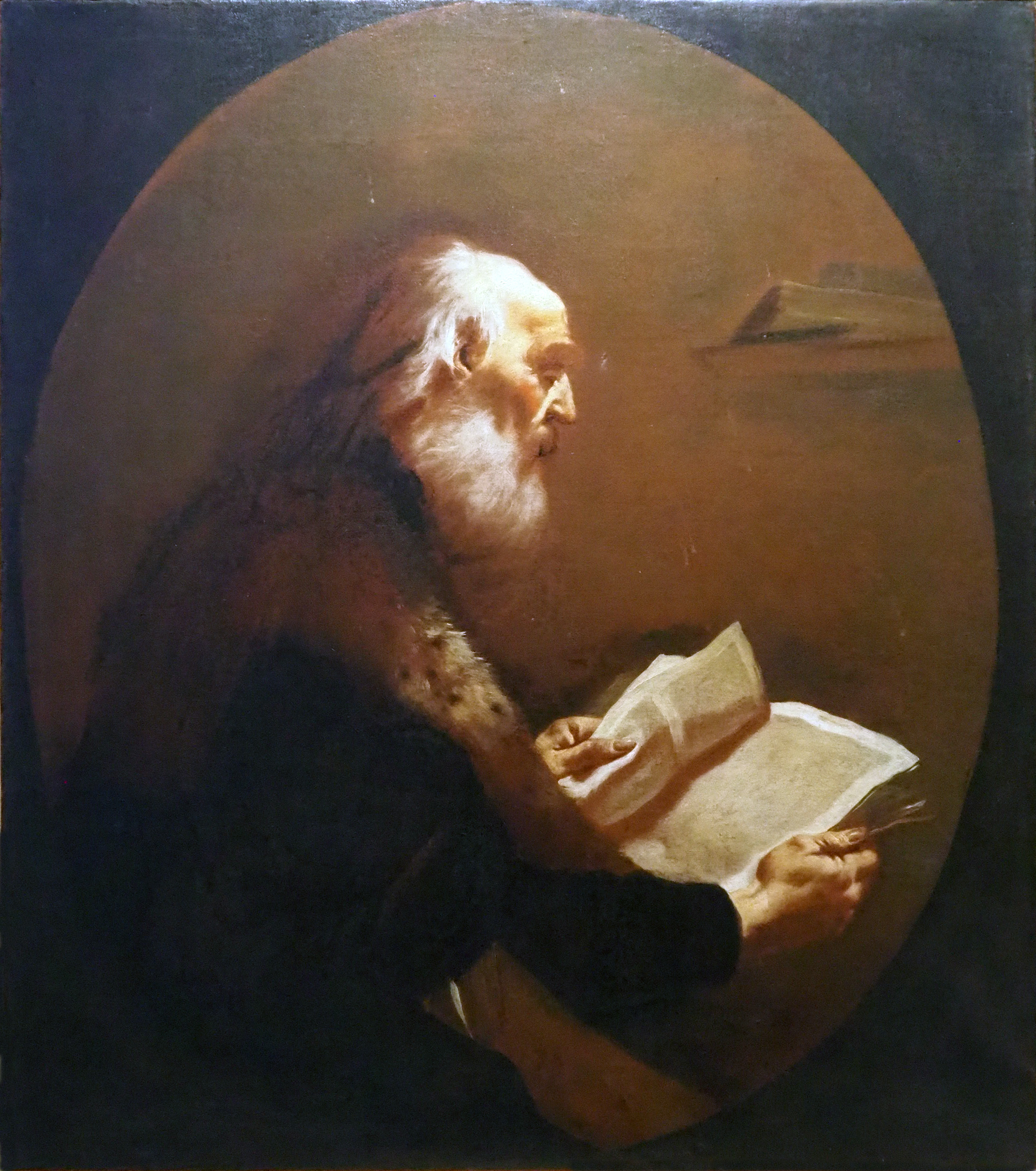
Giambattista Piazzetta, Ritratto di Celio Rodigino, pinacoteca dell'Accademia e del seminario a Palazzo Roverella, Rovigo.

Caelius Rhodiginus (born Lodovico Ricchieri; 1469, Rovigo–1525, Rovigo) was a Venetian writer, and professor in Greek and Latin.

His original name was Ludovico or Lodovico Celio Ricchieri. He took the name Rhodiginus from his birthplace, Rovigo. He studied at Ferrara and Padua. He was a professor in Greek and Latin at Rovigo from 1491-9, and again from 1503-4. He was sacked by the council of Rovigo on 26 May 1504 because of his high-handedness in dealing with the city. He subsequently taught in many places including Bologna, Vicenza, Padua, and Ferrara. In 1515, he became the chair of Greek at Milan; he returned to Rovigo in 1523, and died two years later. His pupil Julius Caesar Scaliger described him as the Varro of his age.

His principal work was the Antiquarum Lectionum in sixteen books published in 1516 in Venice at the Aldine Press. It was a collection of notes on the classics and general topics. Rhodiginus continued to collect materials towards producing a new edition, and the book was posthumously expanded to thirty books and published under the editorship of his nephew Camillo Ricchieri and G. M. Goretti in 1542 at Basle. He also wrote commentaries on Virgil, Ovid, and Horace.
