= Macropedius =

Dutch humanist and Latin playwright

Georgius Macropedius
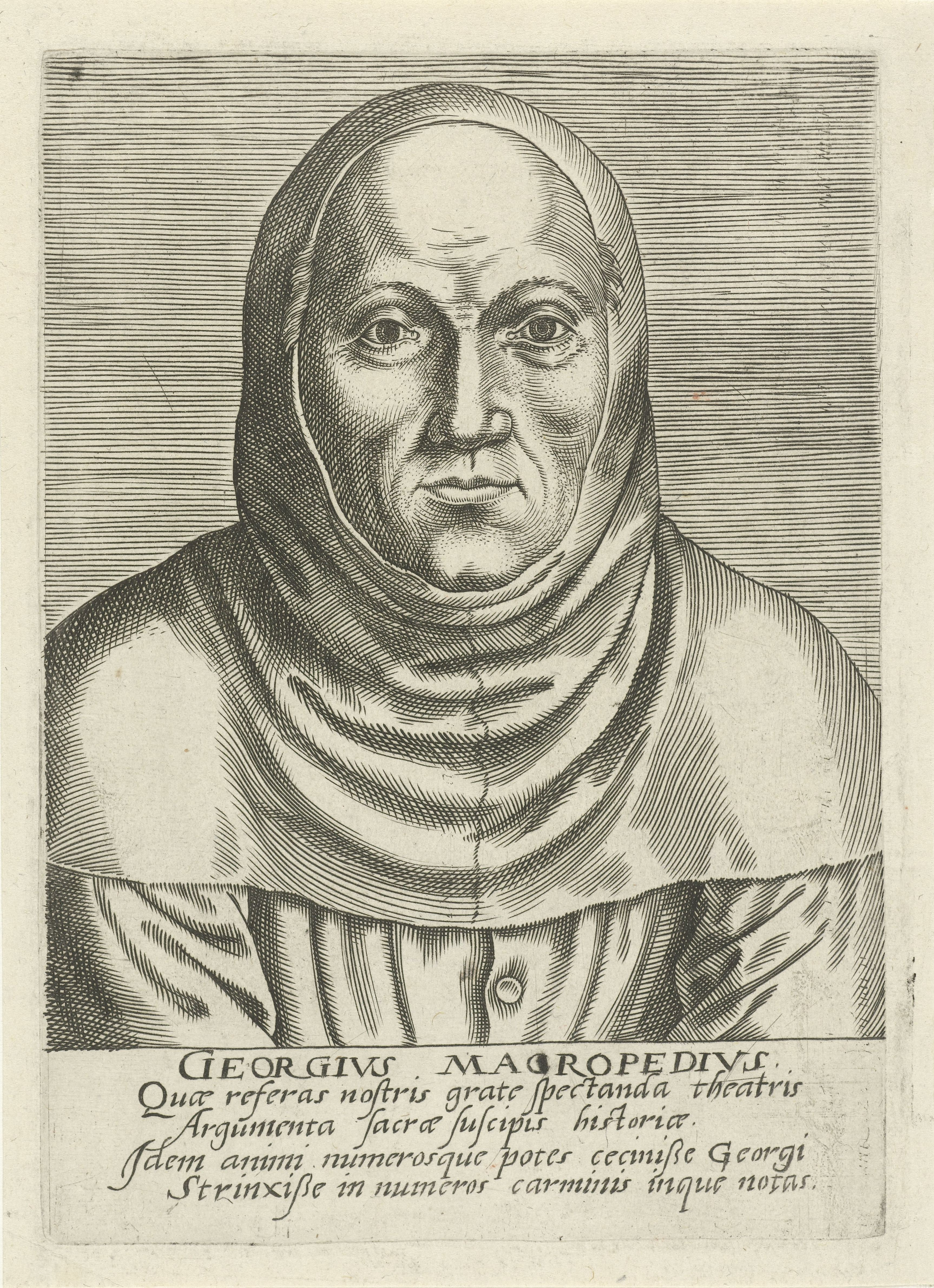
- Georgius Macropedius, portrait by Philips Galle, poem by Benito Arias Montanus. Ghent University Library
- Born: Joris van Lanckvelt; 23 April 1487; Gemert
- Died: July 23, 1558 (aged 71) 's-Hertogenbosch
- Occupations: pedagogue, playwright
- Writing career
- Language: Renaissance Latin
- Genres: school books; plays
- Notable works: Hecastus, Epistolica
- Movements: Devotio Moderna, Renaissance humanism

Georgius Macropedius (born Joris van Lanckvelt; 23 April 1487 – 23 July 1558) was a Dutch humanist, schoolmaster and "the greatest Latin playwright of the 16th century."

== Biography ==
Macropedius was born as Joris van Lanckvelt in Gemert (Northern Brabant, the Netherlands) in 1487. Little is known about his boyhood. After having attended the parish school, Joris van Lanckvelt moved to 's-Hertogenbosch. Here, he attended the local grammar school. Joris lived in one of the boarding-houses of the Brothers of the Common Life, who were followers of the Modern Devotion. In 1502, at the age of fifteen, he became a member of the fraternity and prepared for a career in teaching. About ten years later he was ordained and started teaching Latin at the municipal grammar school. In the years 1506–1510 he had already started writing plays in Renaissance Latin for his students. The first drafts of his drama Asotus (The Prodigal Son) date from this period. He took on a classic name, as was the custom among sixteenth century humanists. Joris became Georgius and Van Lanckvelt was translated into Macropedius.

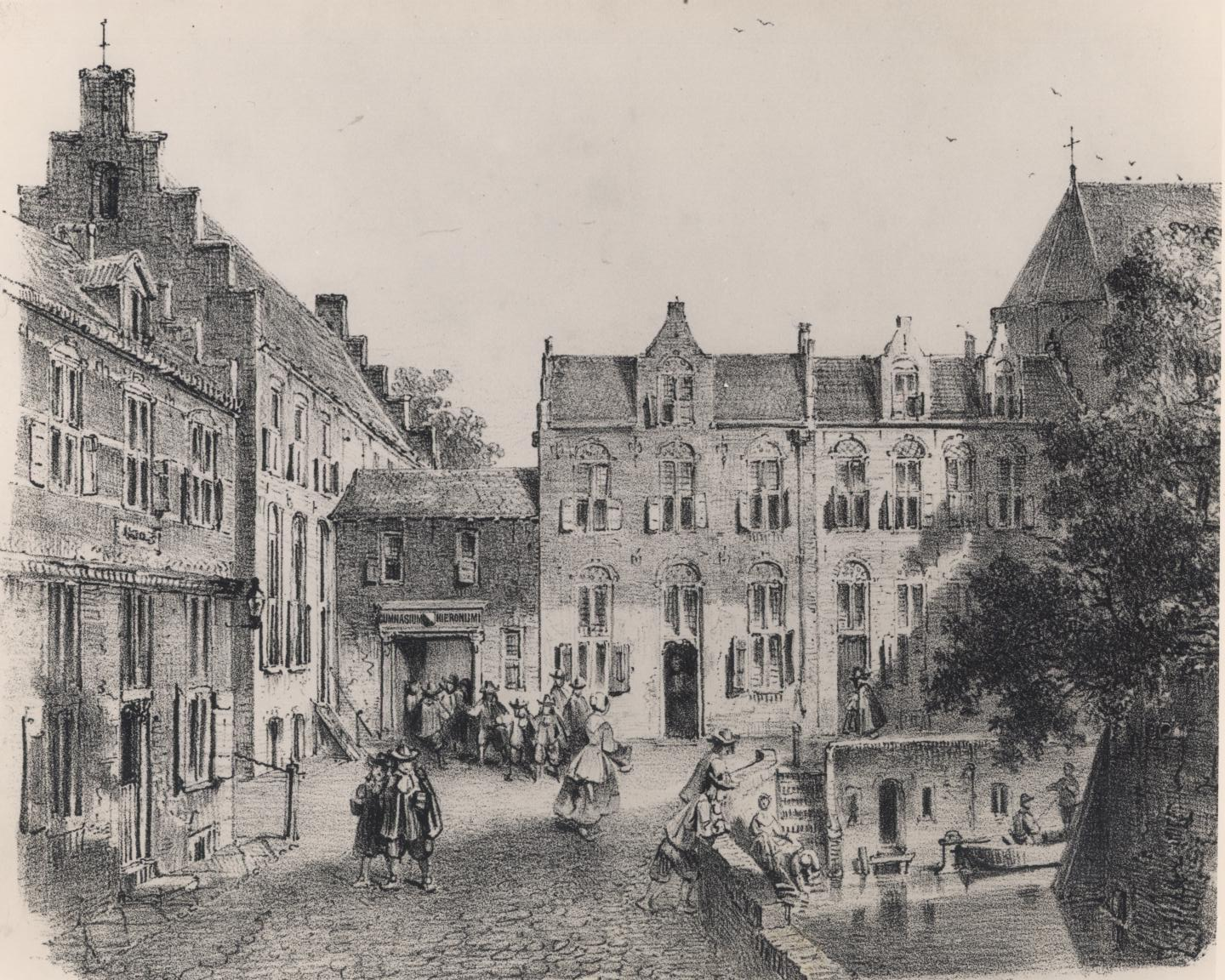
Saint Jerome's in Utrecht in the 17th century. Drawing by J. Liefland, Utrecht 1857.

In 1524 he was appointed headmaster of St. Jerome's in Liège. The Liège grammar school flourished due to activities of both Macropedius and others. In 1527 Macropedius returned to 's-Hertogenbosch and by the end of 1530 Macropedius had already moved to Utrecht, at the time the largest city in the northern part of the Netherlands. Macropedius, who apparently enjoyed some fame at the time and was reputed to be a loyal Roman Catholic, was appointed headmaster. He transformed St. Jerome's in Utrecht into the most famous school in the country. He taught Latin, Greek, poetry, rhetoric, and possibly Hebrew, mathematics and theory of music, too. Every year he composed both text and music of a lengthy Latin school song. At St. Jerome's he wrote most of his Latin textbooks and plays, which were published not only in Utrecht, but also in Antwerp, Basel, Cologne, Frankfurt, 's-Hertogenbosch, Paris and in London.

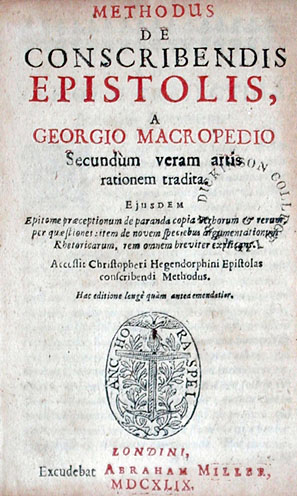
Title page of Macropedius' Methodus de Conscribendis Epistolis, printed in 1649 by Abraham Miller in London, 106 years after the first edition. Dickinson College, Carlisle, Pennsylvania, USA.

In the years 1552–1554 his collected works were revised and edited in two volumes in Utrecht: Omnes Georgii Macropedii Fabulae Comicae. The songs were now printed together with their music. Afterwards, he only wrote one more play: Jesus Scholasticus.

In 1557 or 1558, he resigned as headmaster of the school, and left Utrecht to return to his native soil, Brabant. Here he lived for another year in the House of Brothers of the Common Life in 's-Hertogenbosch. He died at the age of 71 in this town during a period of the plague, in July 1558, and was buried in the Brothers’ church. After his death, his grateful former students erected a monumental tomb there, with an epitaph. They had a portrait painted of their beloved master, which was hung over the tomb. Both tomb and painting have since disappeared and so has the church.

== Writings ==
Macropedius wrote several textbooks. The most famous of all was Epistolica, a textbook on the art of writing letters. It was published for the first time in Antwerp in 1543. It was also printed as Methodus de Conscribendis Epistolis in Basel, Cologne, Dilligen, Frankfurt am Main, 's-Hertogenbosch, and Leiden. The book was published in London in 1576, followed by ten reprints; the last one dates from 1649. Even William Shakespeare may have known it due to the reprint of the work by his friend, fellow townsman and printer, Richard Field. Evidently, the book was used at many schools in Western Europe for a long period of time.

His schoolbooks proved Macropedius to be a man of great humanist culture and follower of Erasmus. He knew all about the seven Free Arts and the Three Languages: Latin, Greek and Hebrew. He was very familiar with classic Greek and Roman literature, with the Bible and with the writings of the Fathers of the Church as well. Many reprints of his textbooks in the Netherlands, in Germany, in France and in England prove that Macropedius’ activities were highly esteemed by his contemporaries and by the next generation of humanists as well. By writing his books and his teachings, Macropedius contributed very much to the successful humanist educational reform in the first part of the sixteenth century. He indefatigably promoted Greek, not only the reading of the New Testament but also the study of the works of the classic Greek authors.

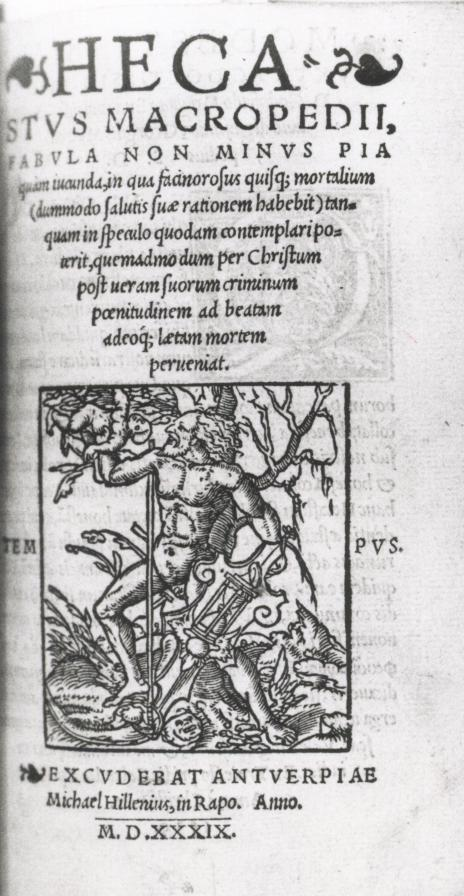
First edition of Macropedius' Hecastus, printed by Johannes Hillen in Antwerp 1539. Tilburg University Library.

Macropedius is primarily recognized for his twelve plays. In both the Netherlands and Germany, he was one of the earliest, most prolific, and accomplished Latin playwright.

Andrisca is a comedy about two shrewd and adulterous women wearing the breeches and fighting their silly husbands. By the end of the century, the same plot was elaborated by William Shakespeare in The Taming of the Shrew. Bassarus is a real Shrovetide play. Asotus is about the Biblical theme of the prodigal son. The play was performed by the students of Trinity College in Cambridge, and at Prague University. In 1539 Macropedius’ most successful play, Hecastus, was published. This drama secured him a place among the world's dramatists. It is a freely composed version of the late medieval Dutch morality play Elckerlijc (in English known as Everyman). The main character, Hecastus, is a wealthy young man enjoying the good things of life. When he learns that he is to die soon, not one of his friends, relatives or servants is willing to accompany him on his final journey. It's considered a masterpiece and it was very successful.

Before the end of the century, Hecastus was performed and printed in the original Latin and in translation. Twelve independent editions and six German translations are known. One of these translations was made by the famous poet of the Reformation, Hans Sachs. The play was also translated into Danish, Dutch and, in 1681, into Swedish. In the Netherlands, Hecastus was performed several times. In Germany the play was the most successful. Eighteen performances have been well established. For the second edition (1552), Macropedius had to revise and extend the play. The tolerant humanist Macropedius was apparently suspected of sympathizing with the Reformation. Therefore, he was forced to revise and extend the second edition (1552) of the play as can be concluded from the prologue as well.

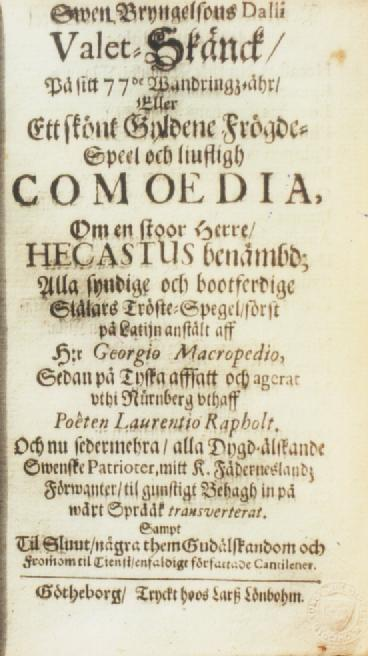
Title page of Sven Dalius' Swedish translation of Hecastus, printed by Lars Loehnbohm in Goeteborg in 1681. Royal Library, Stockholm

== Legacy ==
Macropedius’ successes were not only limited to the field of drama. As a teacher or headmaster in 's-Hertogenbosch, Liège and Utrecht he had many students who later became influential men in government, science and in the arts. Among them were the Greek scholar Arnoldus Arlenius; the philologist Willem Canter; Johannes Heurnius, professor of medicine at Leyden university; the geographer Gerardus Mercator; the lawyer and friend of William of Orange, Elbertus Leoninus; the printer Lawrence Torrentinus, who became famous in Italy; and the well-known physician Johannes Wier, who disputed the belief in witchcraft as early as 1563.

Macropedius remained famous until at least half a century after his death. In 1565 a group of former students published a collection of poems to commemorate their admired master: Apotheosis D. Georgii Macropedii. In the seventeenth century, Macropedius and his works gradually sank into oblivion. His plays were no longer performed and his books were not reprinted anymore. The plays were written in Latin, whereas the self-confident poets and playwrights of the Dutch Republic increasingly used their native language. It was not until after two centuries that his name became known again. The twentieth century saw numerous books and articles about the humanist. In 1972 the American Thomas W. Best published his Macropedius in the New York Twayne's World Authors Series. In recent years, more books and articles were published in Europe, South Africa, Canada and in the United States. His plays were translated into Dutch and English as well. English translations of three plays are being presented on the Web.
