= Bakel en Milheeze =

Coordinates: 51°30′N 5°46′E

Coat of Arms

Bakel en Milheeze is a former municipality in the Dutch province of North Brabant. It consisted of the villages Bakel, Milheeze, and De Rips. It has been a part of the municipality of Gemert-Bakel since 1997.
