= Gemert =

- Town
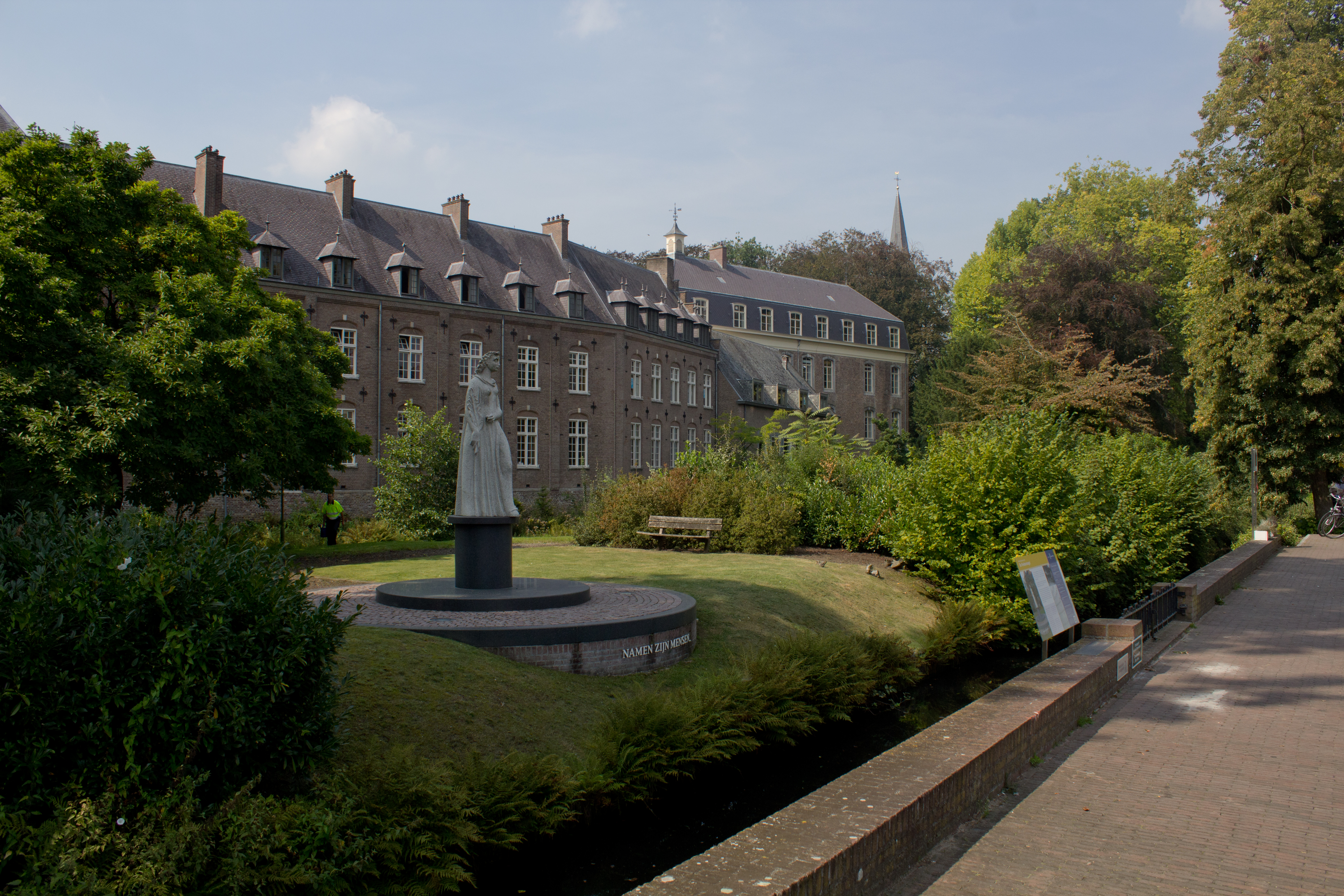
- Castle of Gemert

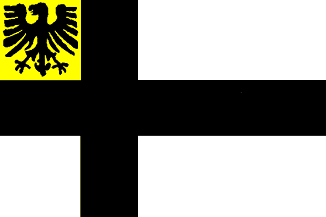
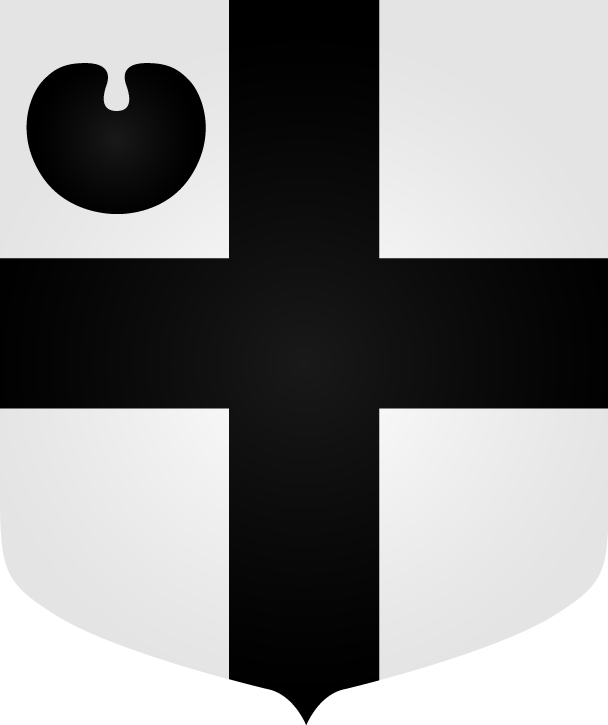
- Flag Coat of arms

- Location in the province of North Brabant in the Netherlands Gemert (Netherlands)
- Coordinates: 51°33′21″N 5°41′12″E
- Country: Netherlands
- Province: North Brabant
- Municipality: Gemert-Bakel

Area
  - Total: 19.92 km^{2} (7.69 sq mi)
- Elevation: 18 m (59 ft)

Population (2021)
  - Total: 16,820
  - Density: 844.4/km^{2} (2,187/sq mi)
- Time zone: UTC+1 (CET)
  - Summer (DST): UTC+2 (CEST)
- Postal code: 5420-5422
- Dialing code: 0492

Gemert is a town in the Dutch province of North Brabant. It is located in the municipality of Gemert-Bakel.

Gemert was a separate municipality until 1997, when it merged with Bakel.

From the 13th century until 1807 Gemert was owned by the knights of the Teutonic Order and had independence from the Netherlands, chose to remain neutral throughout many wars and conflicts over the centuries.

The spoken language is Peellands (an East Brabantian dialect, which is very similar to colloquial Dutch).

== Population centres ==
The population centres from Gemert are Handel, De Mortel and Elsendorp. Gemert also has a little chapel village called Esdonk and a Protestant mining village called Vossenberg.

== Notable people born in Gemert ==
- Georgius Macropedius also known as Joris van Lanckvelt (1487–1558), humanist and playwright
- Lawrence Torrentinus (1499–1563), printer for the Duke of Florence
- Jan van Amstel (naval hero) (1618–1668), admiral in the fleet of Michiel de Ruyter
- Jan van Gemert (1921–1991), visual artist
- Matthijs Verhofstadt (1677–1731), organ builder
- Anton Borret (1782–1858), member of the Council of State, Governor of the Dutch East Indies, and Governor of Limburg
- Gerlacus van den Elsen (1853–1925), priest
- Cor Roffelsen (1889–1958), architect
- Charles Moons (1917–2005), President of the Supreme Court of the Netherlands
- Harmen Tiddens (1923–2002), pediatrician, professor, and rector of Maastricht University
- Wim Verstappen (1937–2004), filmmaker and director
- Toon Grassens (1940), visual artist
- Haico Scharn (1945–2021), athlete
- Bart van der Laar (1945–1981), music producer
- Gerard van Lankveld (1947), visual artist
- Kees van Rooij (1959), politician
- Arno Kantelberg (1968), writer, style icon, editor-in-chief
- Caroline van den Elsen (1969), politician
- Leon Vlemmings (1970), professional footballer
- Stefan van Dierendonck (1972), writer
- René Paardekooper (1987), professional footballer
- Joost Habraken (1988), footballer
- Laura van den Elzen (1997), singer

== Places of interest ==
=== Castle and Castle Park ===
The construction of the castle began in 1391. Till 1794 the castle was used by the German Order. In 1916 the castle was used as a mission monastic. The castle has a Castle Park in English style. In the park there is also the liberation monument from World War II.

=== Museums ===
Het Boerenbondsmuseum is a museum in Gemert. In this museum there are some objects and some buildings about the farmerpopulation near Gemert around 1900.

=== Religious buildings ===
Gemert has two churches:

- De Kerk van Sint-Jans Onthoofding.
- Sint-Gerardus Majellakerk.

Gemert has also one monastery:

- Klooster Nazareth.

== Gallery ==
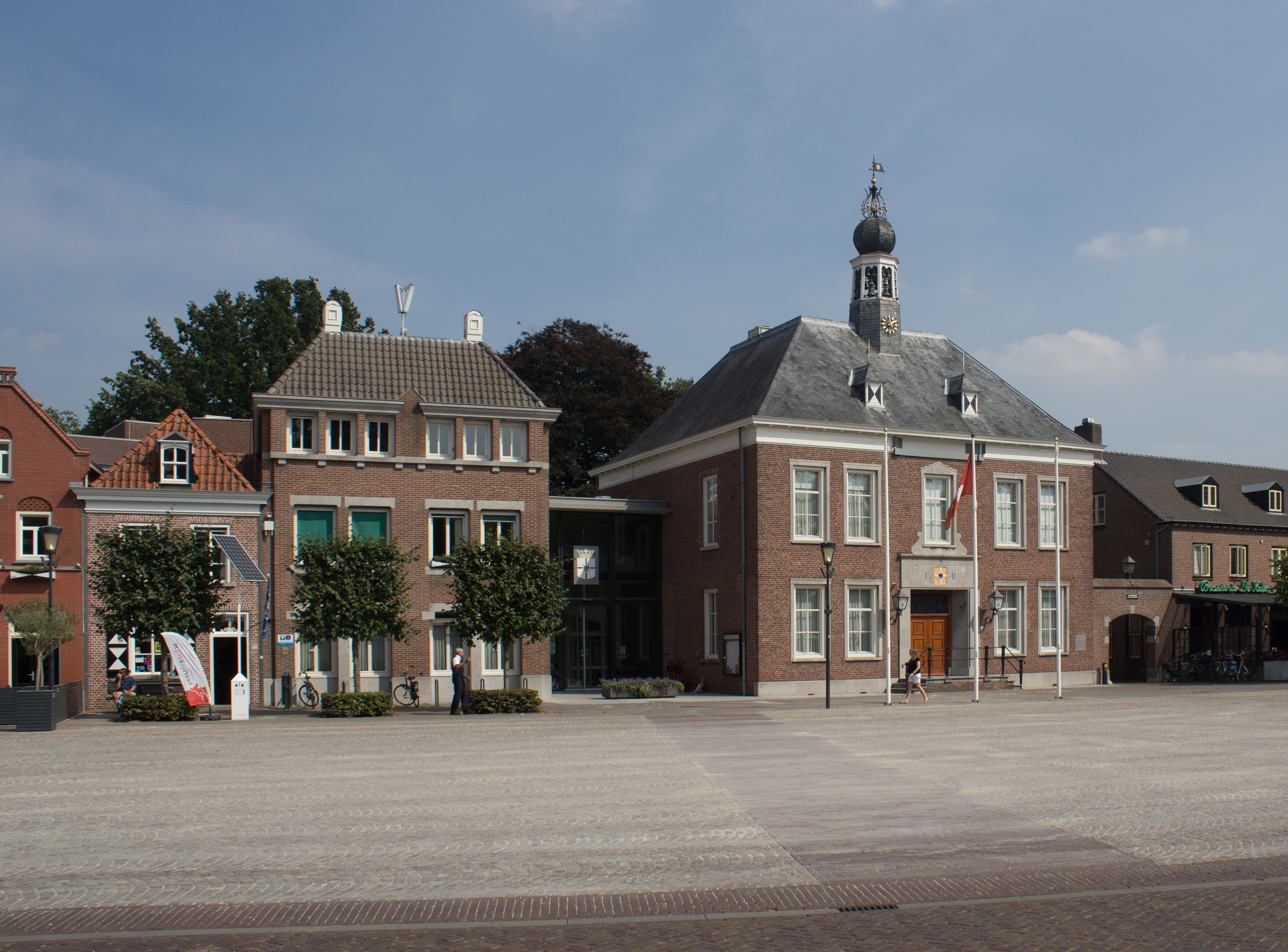
Town hall

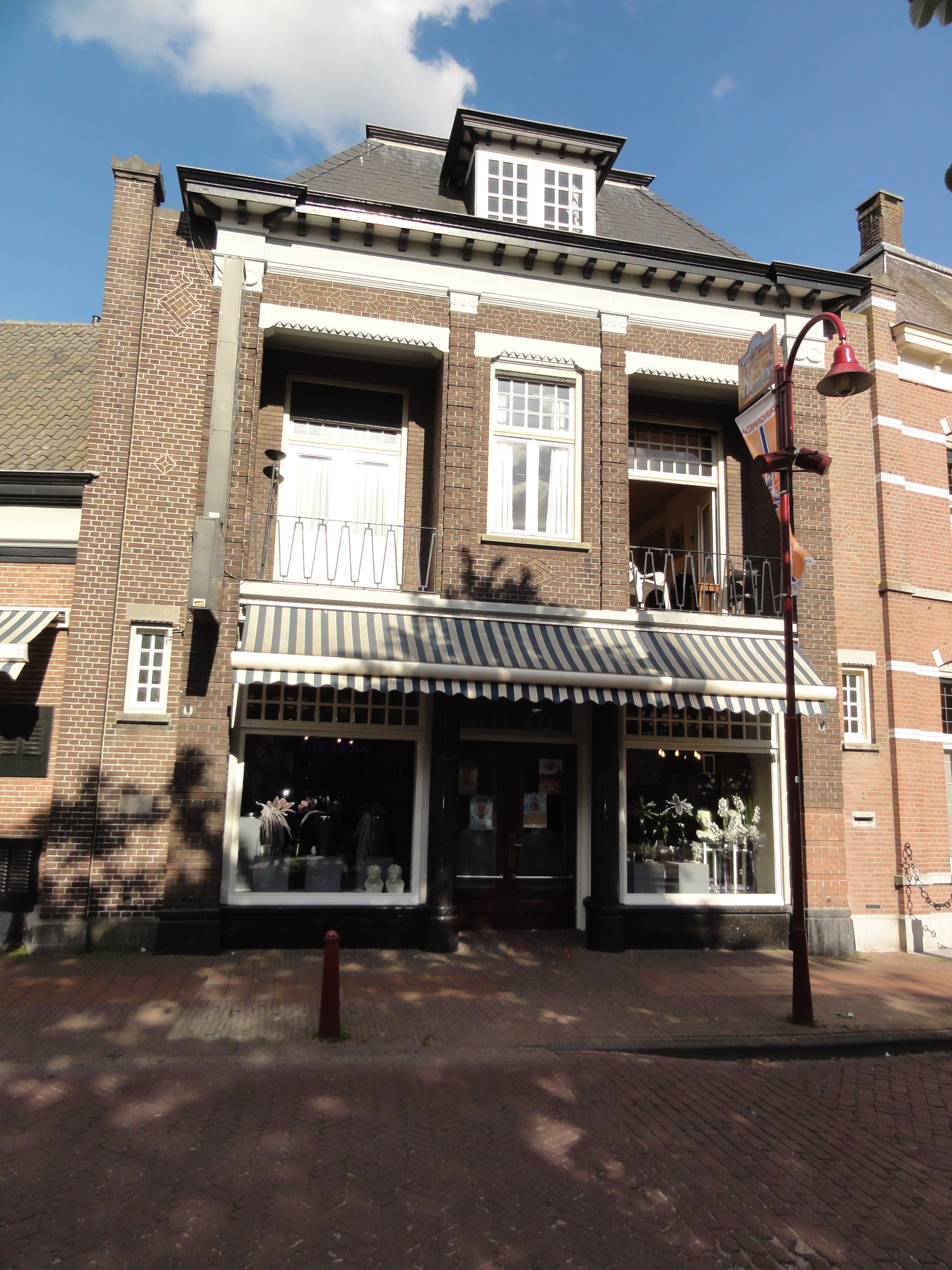
Building in Gemert

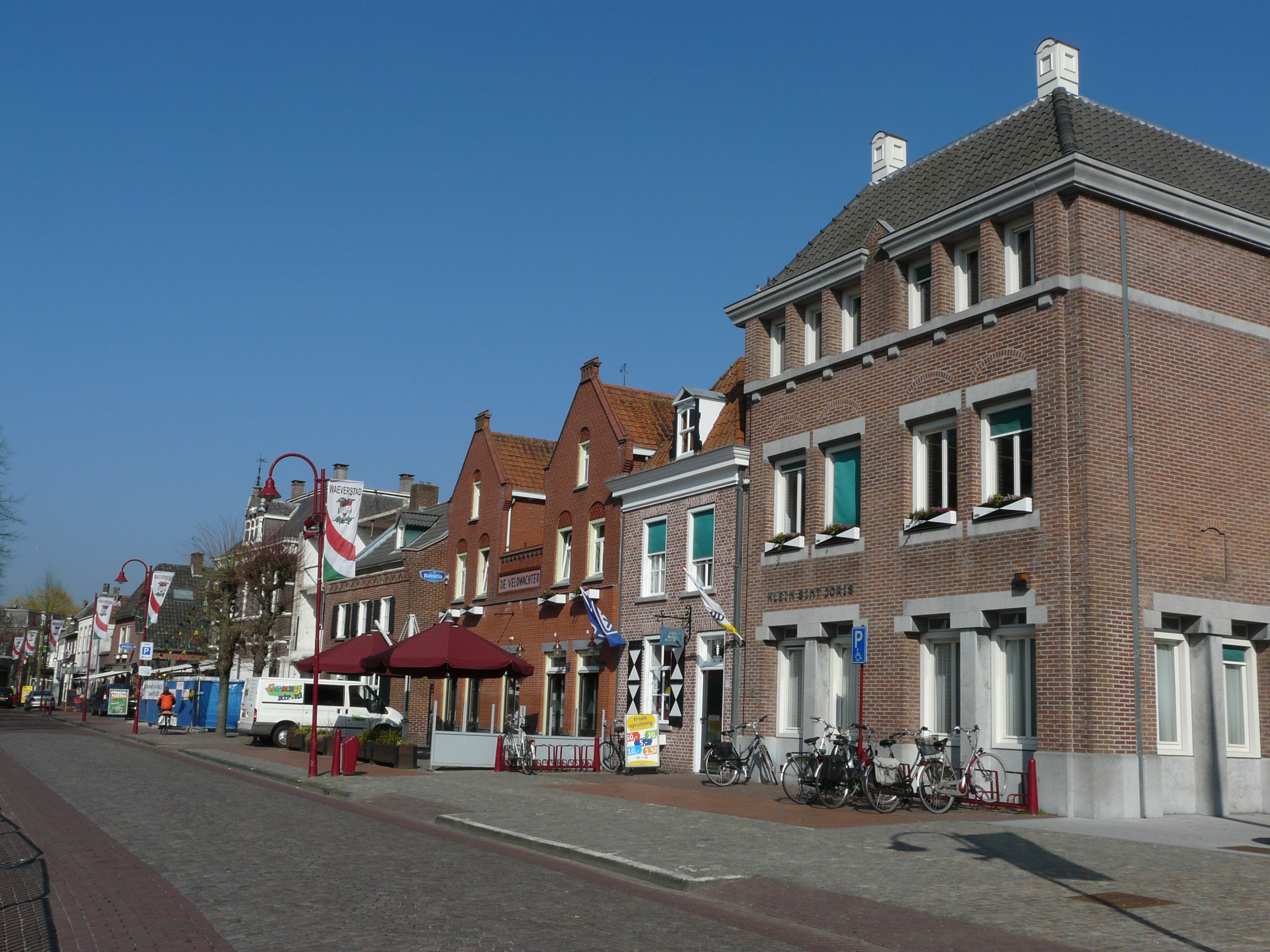
Street view

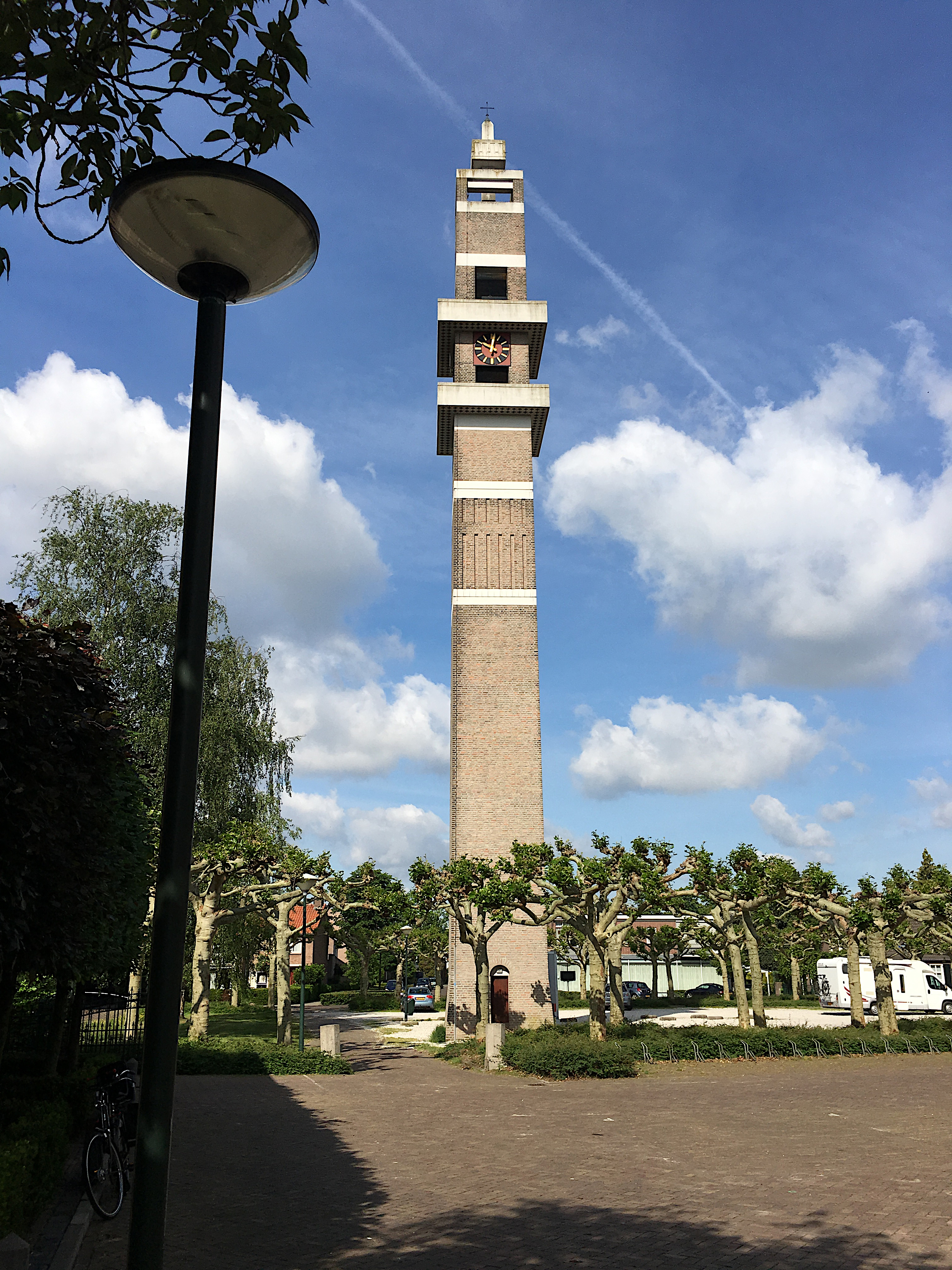
Tower of the St Gerardus Majella Church
