= Gemert-Bakel =

- Municipality
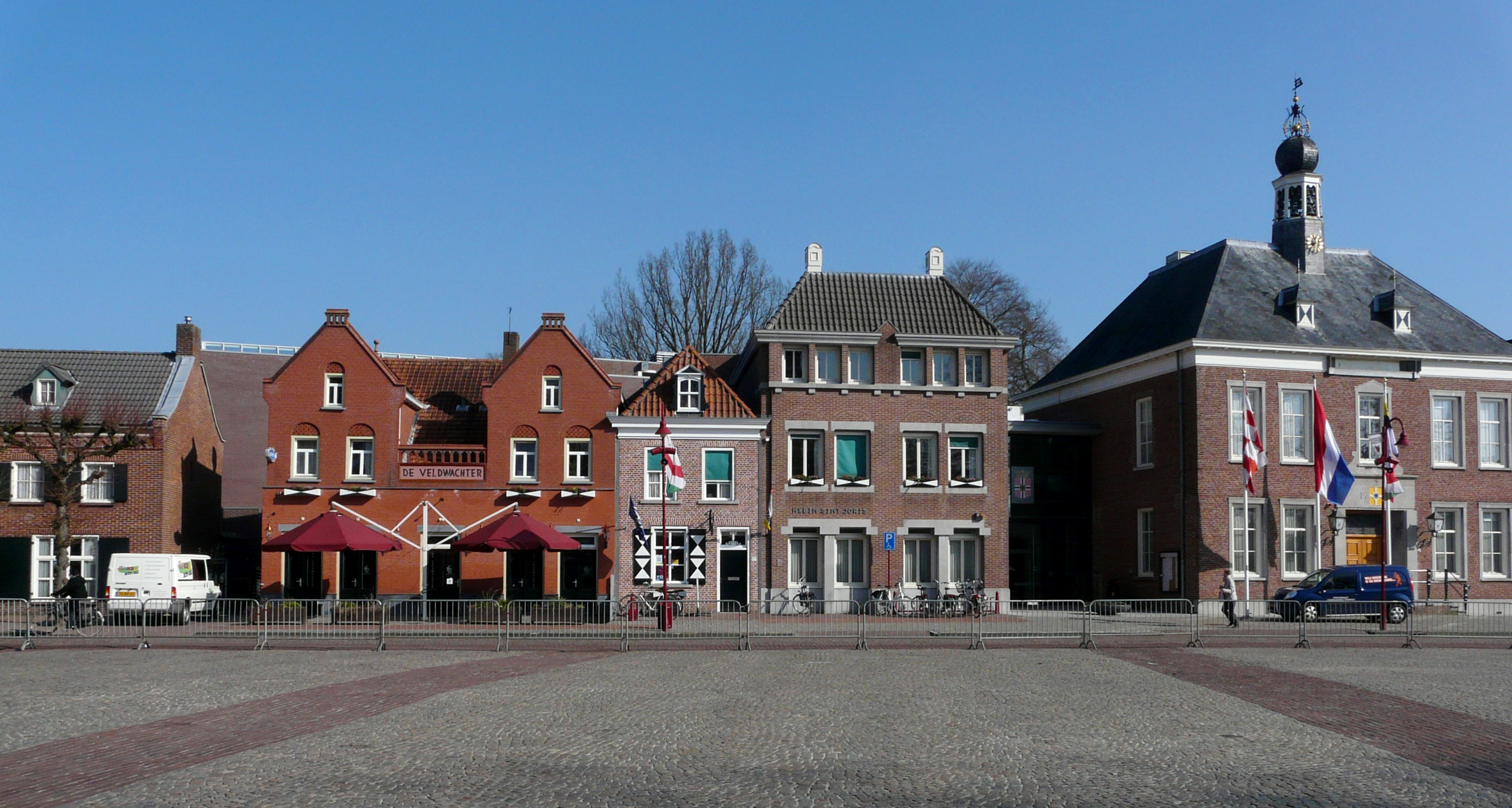
- Gemert town centre

- Flag Coat of arms

- Location in North Brabant
- Coordinates: 51°33′N 5°41′E
- Country: Netherlands
- Province: North Brabant
- Established: 1 January 1997

Government
  - Body: Municipal council
  - Mayor: Michiel van Veen (VVD)

Area
  - Total: 123.34 km^{2} (47.62 sq mi)
  - Land: 122.14 km^{2} (47.16 sq mi)
  - Water: 1.20 km^{2} (0.46 sq mi)
- Elevation: 15 m (49 ft)

Population (January 2021)
  - Total: 30,760
  - Density: 252/km^{2} (650/sq mi)
- Time zone: UTC+1 (CET)
  - Summer (DST): UTC+2 (CEST)
- Postcode: 5420–5425, 5760–5764
- Area code: 0492, 0493
- Website: www.gemert-bakel.nl

Gemert-Bakel (Dutch pronunciation: [ˌɣeːmərd ˈbaːkəl]) is a municipality in southern Netherlands.

== Geography ==
=== Population centres ===
- Bakel
- De Mortel
- De Rips
- Elsendorp
- Gemert
- Handel
- Milheeze

=== Topography ===
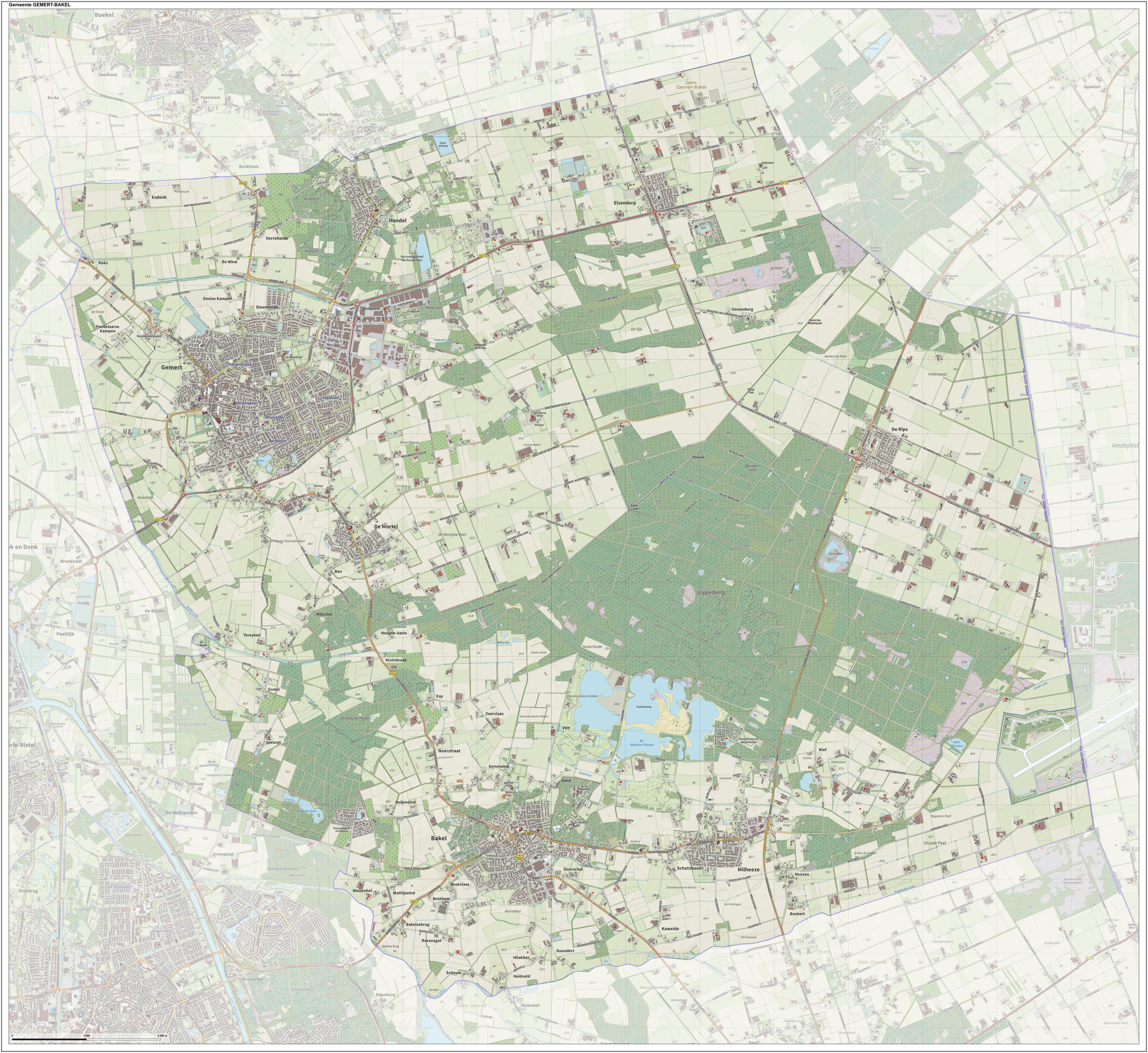

Dutch Topographic map of the municipality of Gemert-Bakel, June 2015

=== Climate ===
Climate in this area has mild differences between highs and lows, and there is adequate rainfall year-round. The Köppen Climate Classification subtype for this climate is "Cfb". (Marine West Coast Climate/Oceanic climate).

Climate data for Gemert-Bakel
Month	Jan	Feb	Mar	Apr	May	Jun	Jul	Aug	Sep	Oct	Nov	Dec	Year
Mean daily maximum °C (°F)	4 (39)	4 (39)	9 (49)	13 (56)	18 (64)	21 (69)	22 (72)	22 (71)	19 (66)	14 (57)	8 (47)	6 (43)	13 (56)
Mean daily minimum °C (°F)	−1 (31)	−2 (29)	2 (35)	4 (39)	7 (45)	10 (50)	13 (55)	12 (54)	10 (50)	7 (44)	3 (38)	2 (36)	6 (42)
Average precipitation mm (inches)	69 (2.7)	51 (2)	79 (3.1)	30 (1.2)	48 (1.9)	58 (2.3)	89 (3.5)	81 (3.2)	71 (2.8)	51 (2)	48 (1.9)	61 (2.4)	730 (28.9)
Average precipitation days	8.8	6.3	5.8	4	6	6.7	7.8	8.7	8.2	7	5.4	8.8	83.5
Source: Weatherbase

== Castle ==
In the centre of Gemert stands a castle of which the oldest parts date back to the Late Middle Ages, although it has been rebuilt a couple of times. It was founded by German knights who lived in the castle for several hundred years, however these days it is occupied by monks and nuns. The predecessor of this castle was a motte-and-bailey located further to the west and was discovered in 1995. It is said that the town's founder Diederik van Gemert lived here.

== Notable people ==
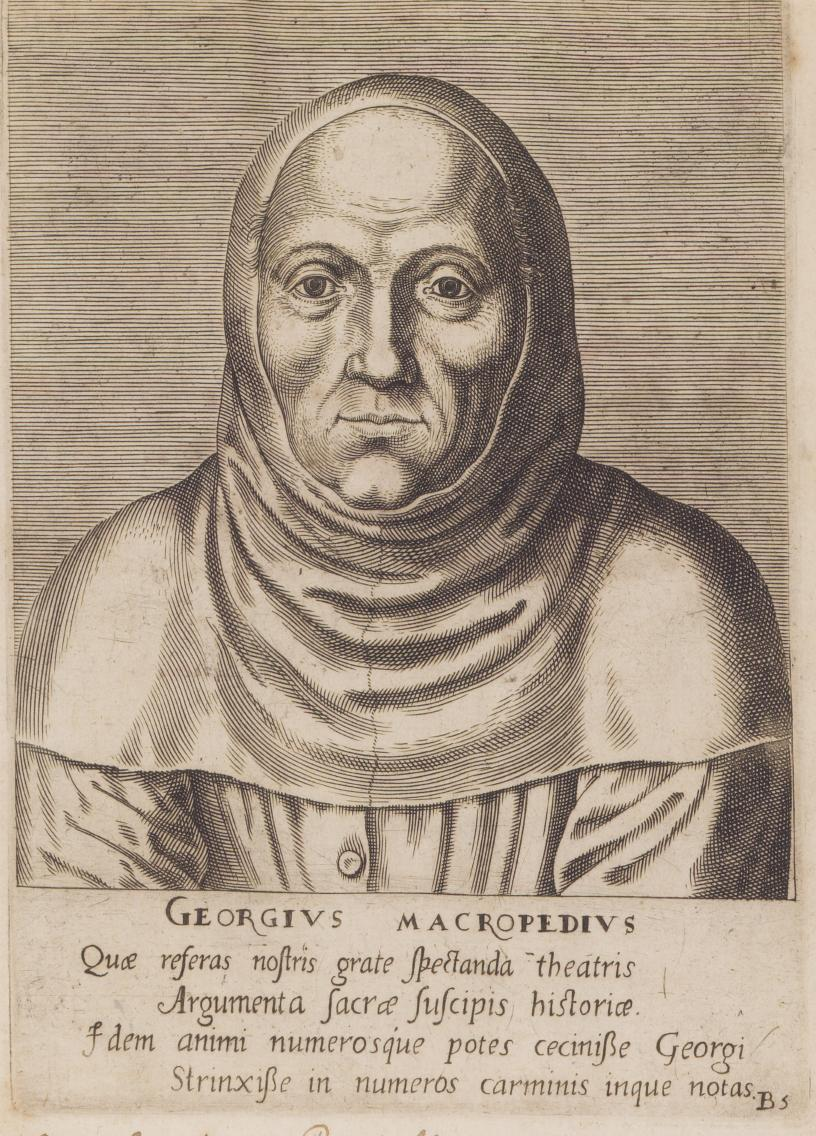
portrait of Macropedius, 1572

- Georgius Macropedius (1487 in Gemert – 1558) Dutch humanist and schoolmaster
- Lawrence Torrentinus (1499 in Gemert – 1563) Dutch-Italian humanist, typographer and printer for Cosimo I de' Medici, Duke of Florence
- Jan van Gemert (1921 in Gemert – 1991) Dutch painter, graphic artist, sculptor, glass artist and ceramist
- Wim Verstappen (1937 in Gemert – 2004) Dutch film director and producer, television director, and screen writer
- Frans van der Hoff (born 1939 in De Rips) Dutch missionary who helped launch Max Havelaar the first Fairtrade label in 1988
- Haico Scharn (1945–2021, born in Gemert) Dutch middle-distance runner, competed at the 1972 Summer Olympics
- Victor Allis (born 1965 in Gemert) Dutch computer scientist and academic

== Trivia ==
The spoken language is Peellands (an East Brabantian dialect, which is very similar to colloquial Dutch).

== Gallery ==
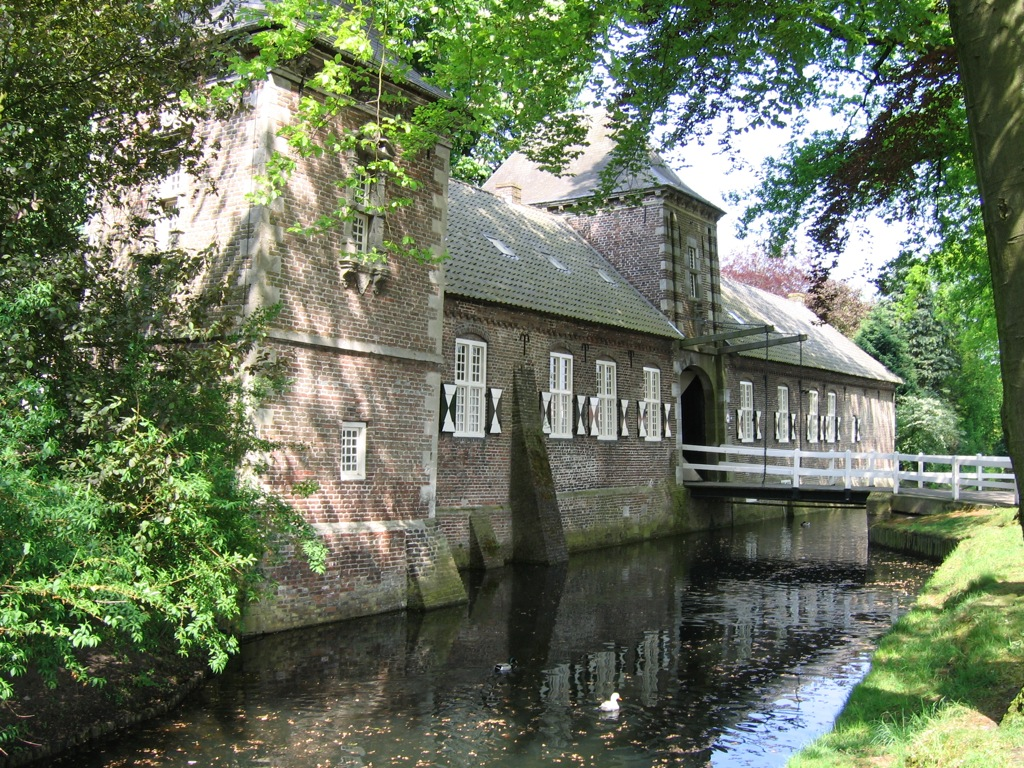
Kasteel Gemert

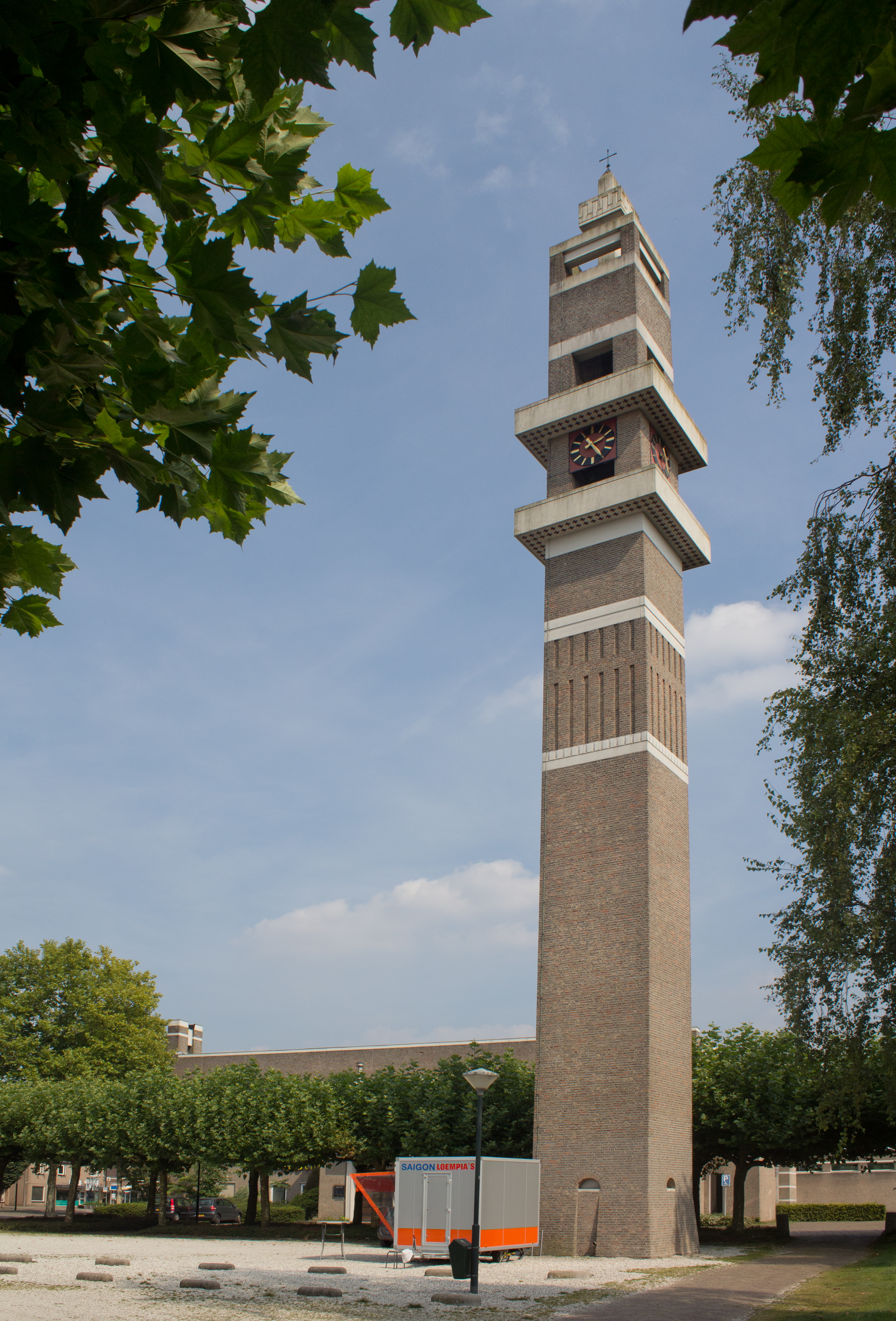
Gemert gerardus majellakerk toren

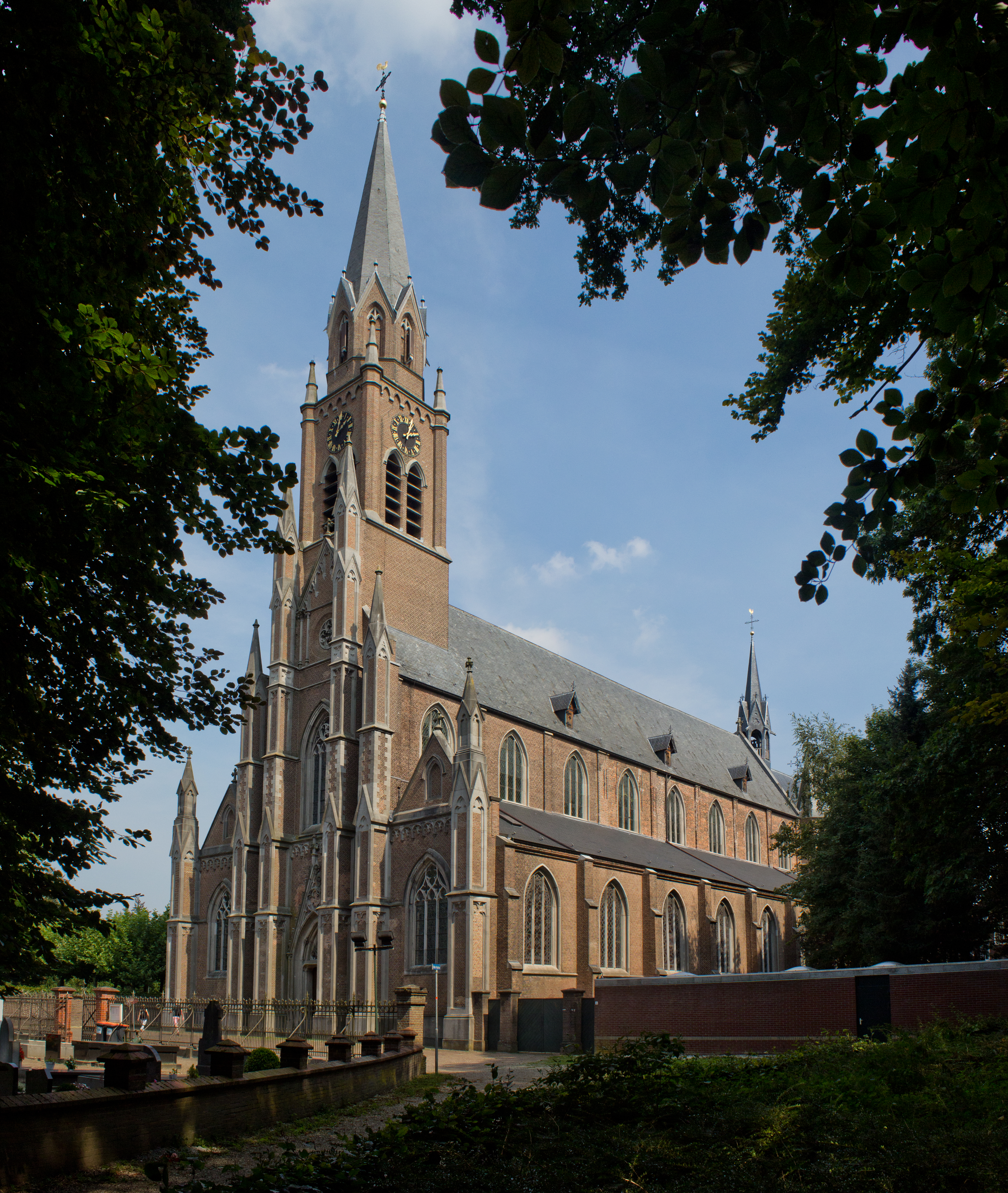
St. Jan de Doperkerk

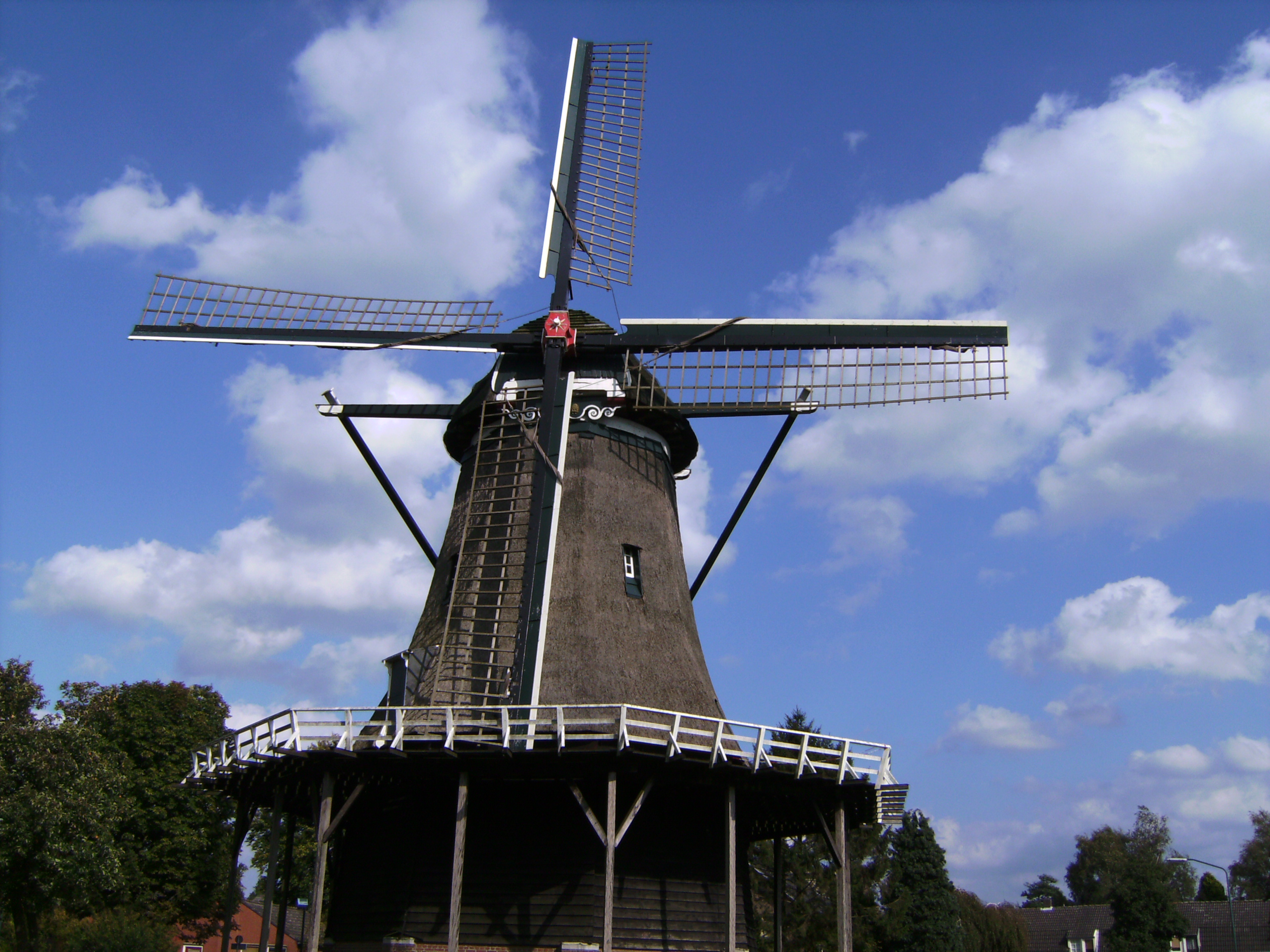
Gemert, molen
