= Bakel, Netherlands =

Bakel
- Village
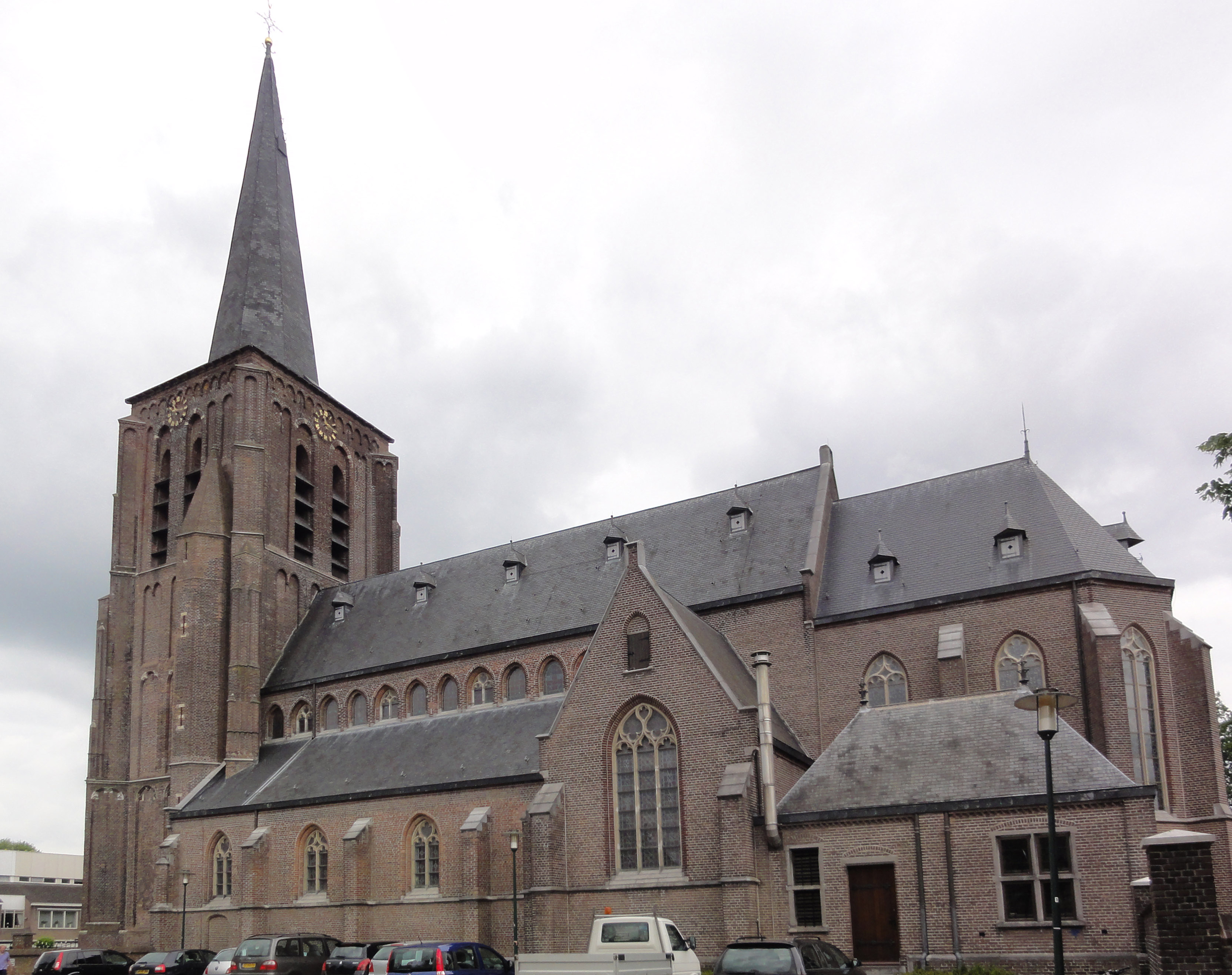
- St Willbrordus Church

- Location in the province of North Brabant in the Netherlands Bakel (Netherlands)
- Coordinates: 51°30′9″N 5°44′27″E
- Country: Netherlands
- Province: North Brabant
- Municipality: Gemert-Bakel

Area
  - Total: 20.87 km^{2} (8.06 sq mi)
- Elevation: 21 m (69 ft)

Population (2021)
  - Total: 5,960
  - Density: 286/km^{2} (740/sq mi)
- Time zone: UTC+1 (CET)
  - Summer (DST): UTC+2 (CEST)
- Postal code: 5761
- Dialing code: 0492

Bakel is a village east of Helmond and Eindhoven in southern part of the Netherlands. The total population is approximately 5,000. Until 1997, it formed the municipality of Bakel and Milheeze together with Milheeze. In 1997 Bakel merged with the Gemert municipality.

Bakel does not have old buildings, with the exception of the 16th century St Willibrordus Church which is the oldest in the area. This church was modernized during the 1970s, but regained some of the original style of decoration during the 1990s.

The area surrounding Bakel is heavily forested; the agricultural economy is dominated by the bio industry. It has the highest pig density in the Netherlands.

== History ==
The village was first mentioned in 715 as Bagoloso, which means "open forest on a ridge".

The St Willibrordus Church, built in the 16th century, was severely damaged by fire in 1708, and largely rebuilt in 1721.

Bakel was home to 277 people in 1840.

== Gallery ==
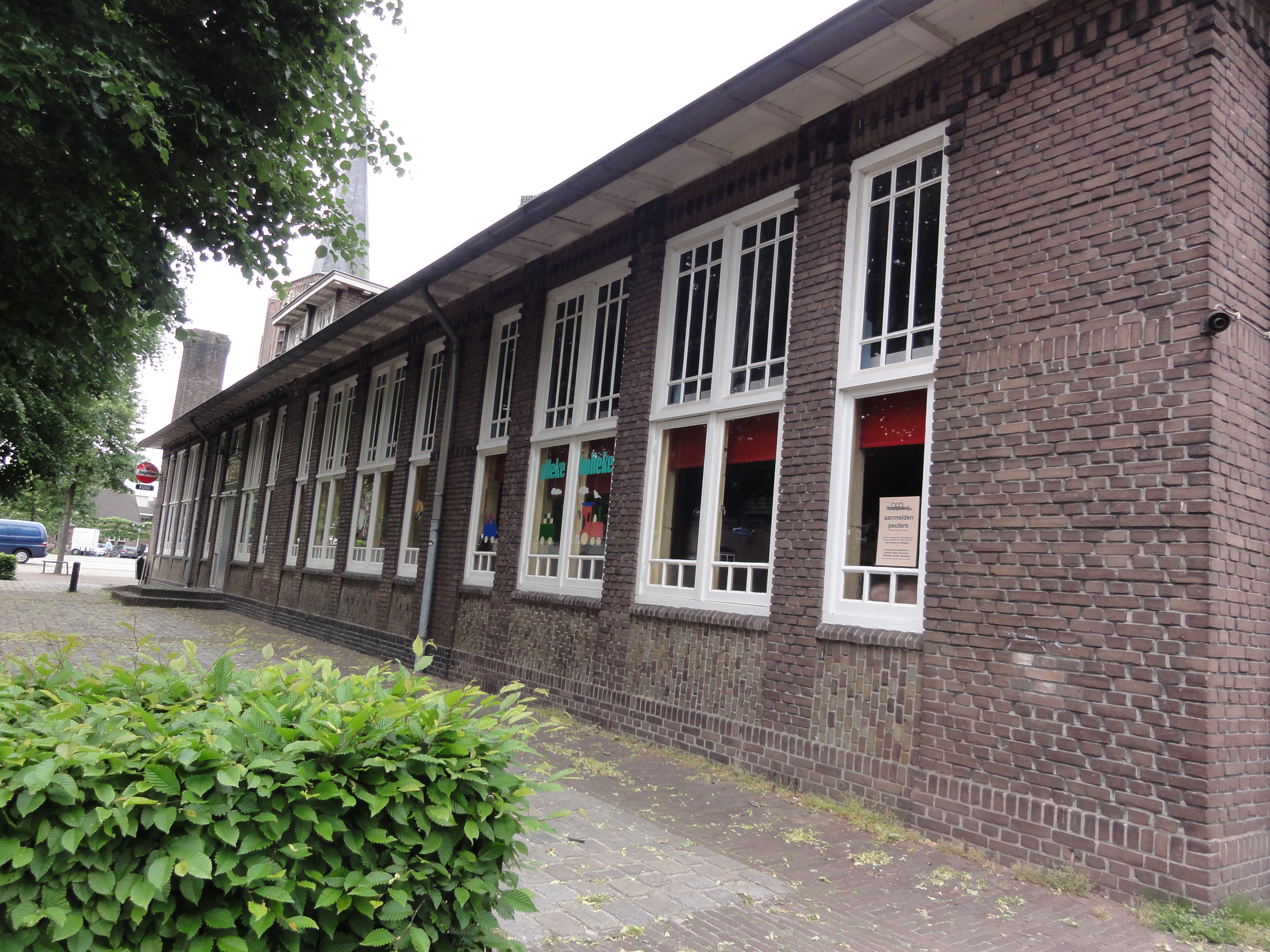
School in Bakel

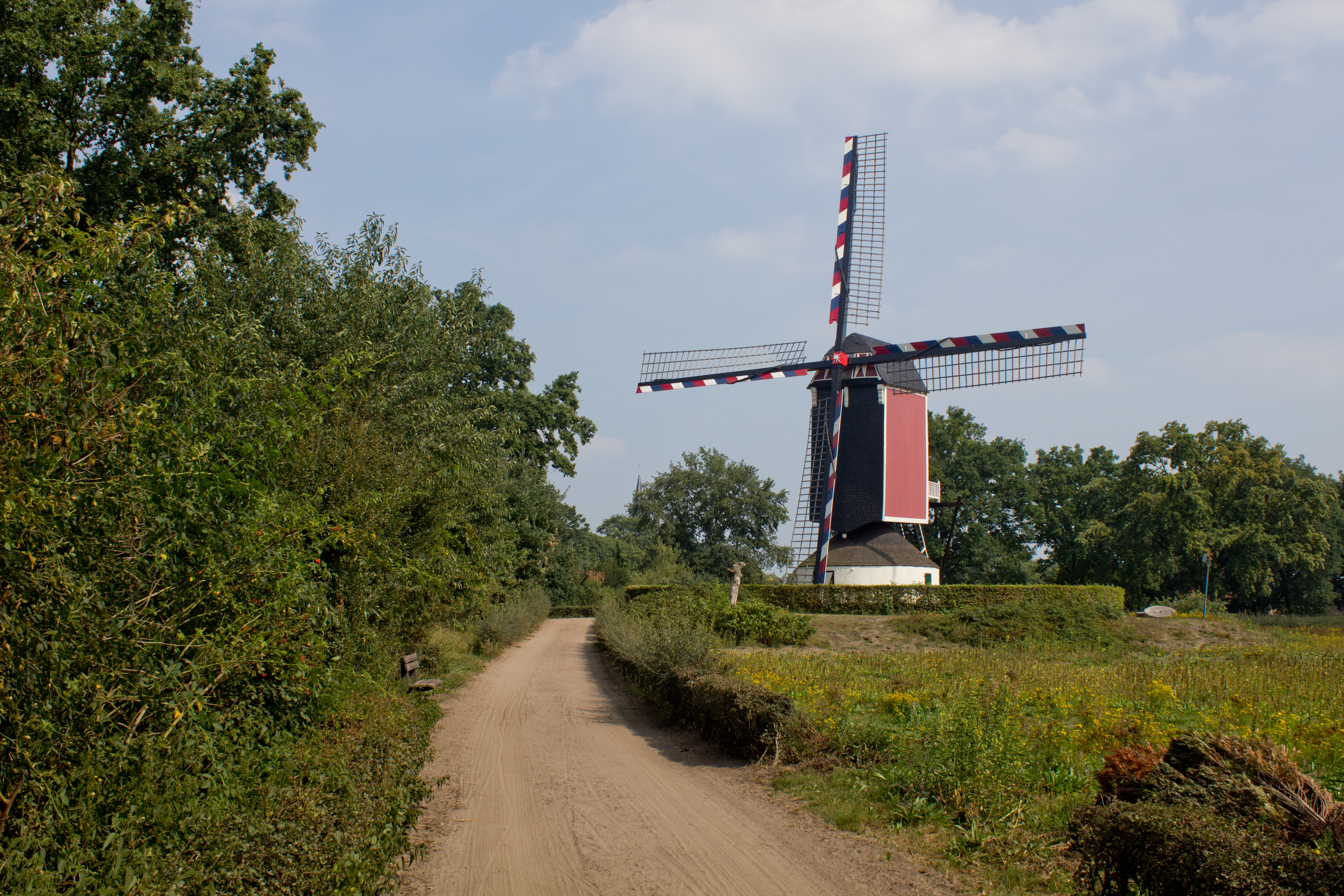
Willibrordus mill

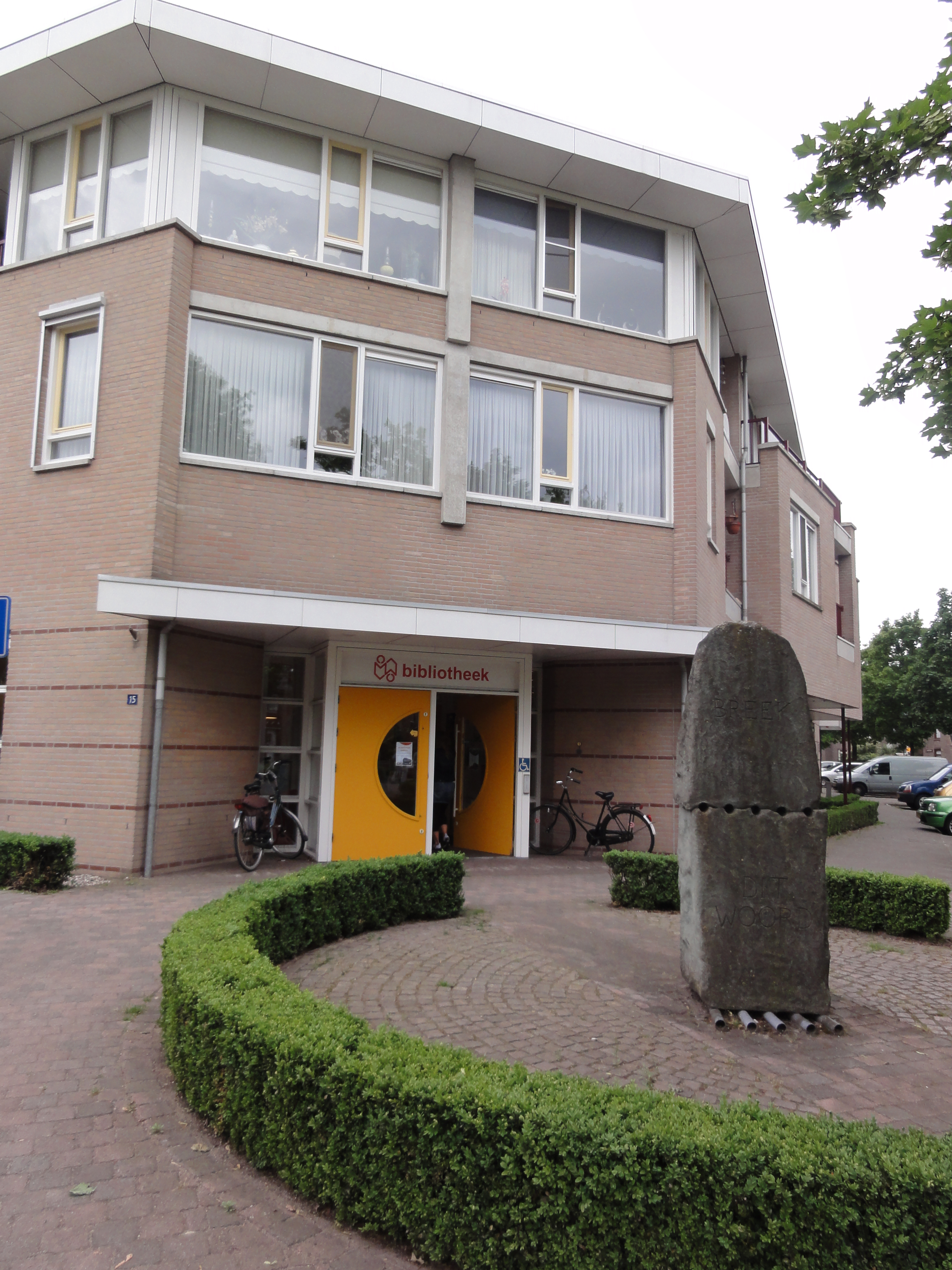
Library with art

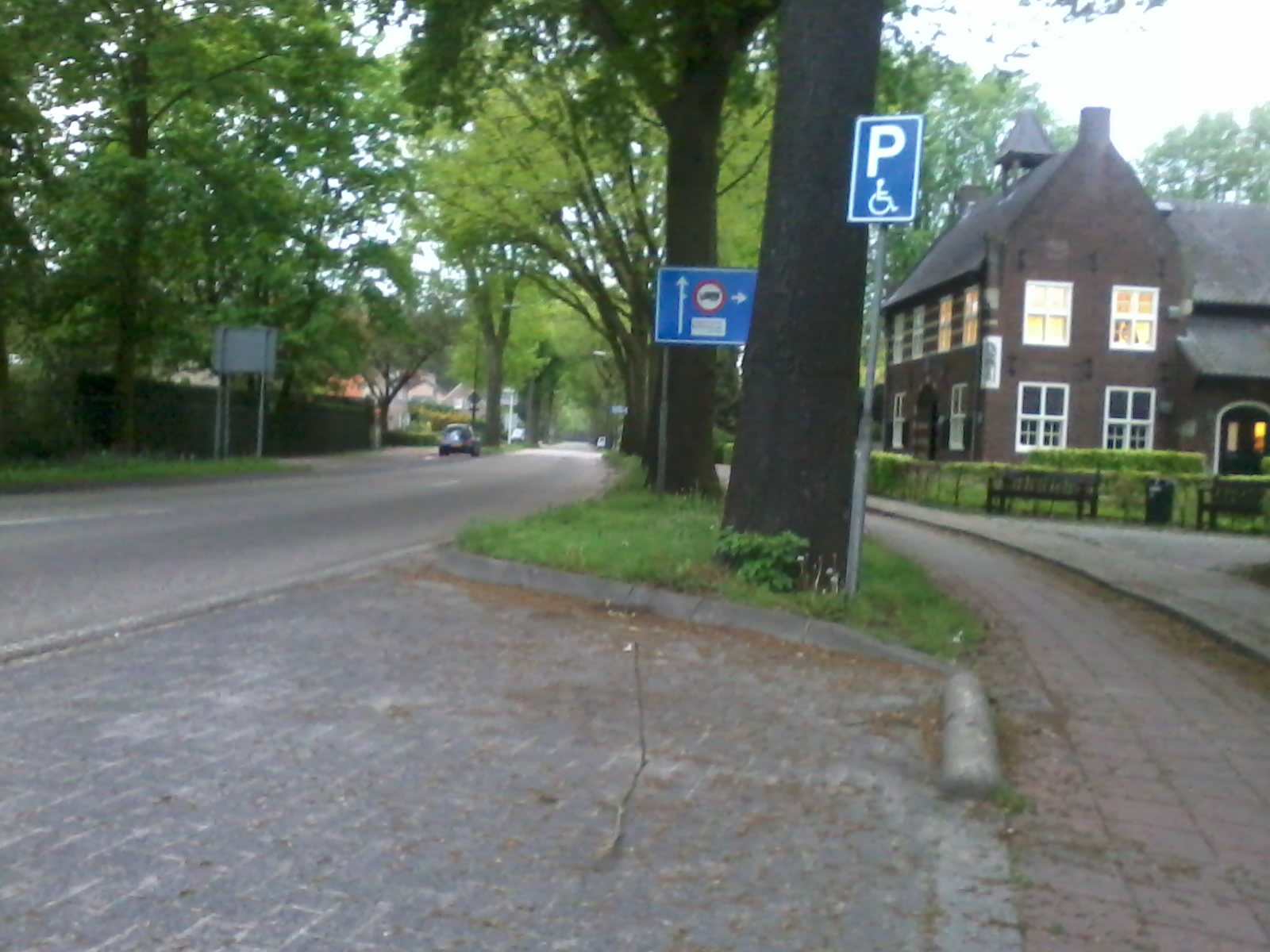
Street view
