= Milheeze =

- Village
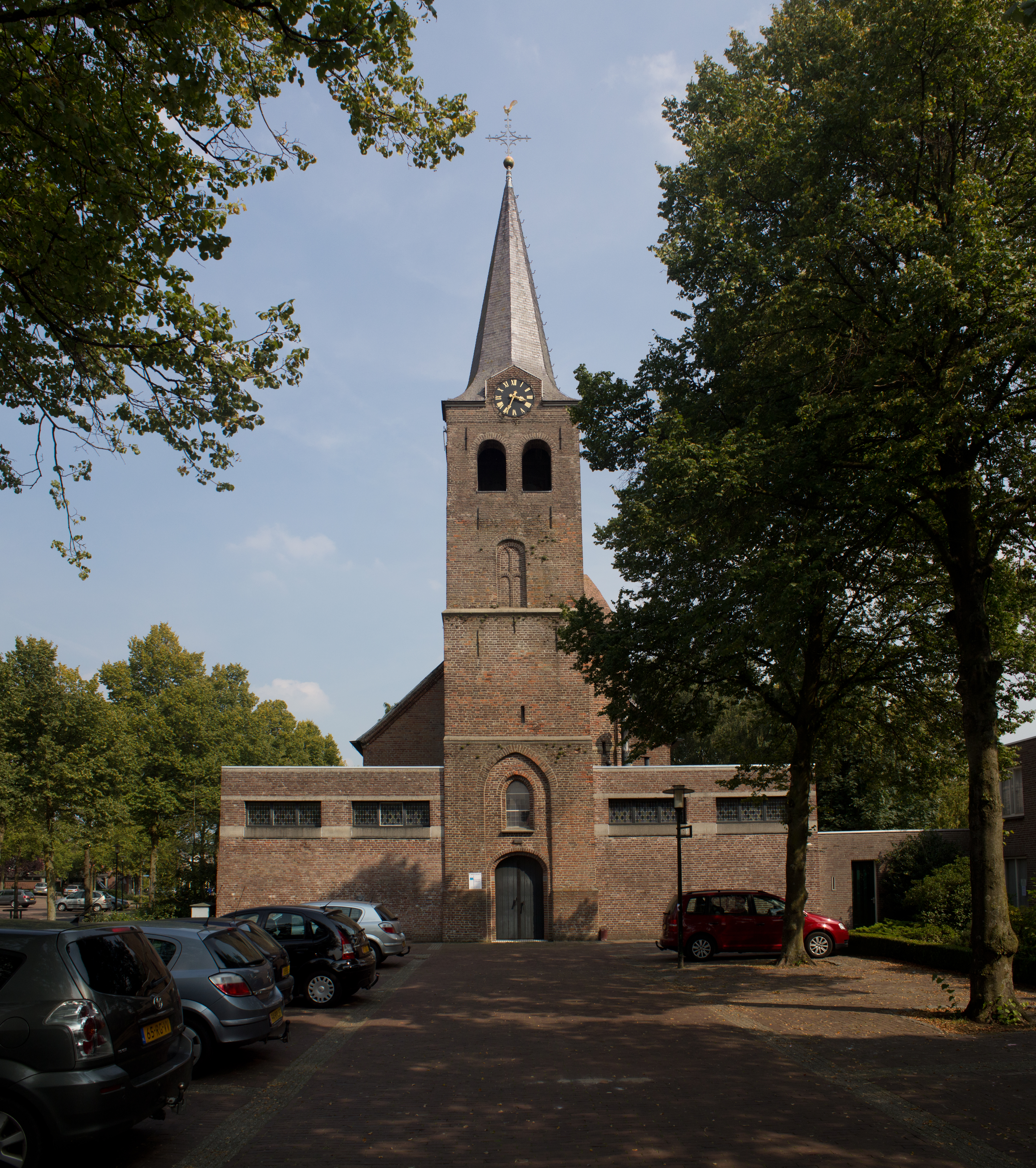
- St Willibrordus Church

- Location in the province of North Brabant in the Netherlands Milheeze (Netherlands)
- Coordinates: 51°30′8″N 5°46′44″E
- Country: Netherlands
- Province: North Brabant
- Municipality: Gemert-Bakel

Area
  - Total: 19.72 km^{2} (7.61 sq mi)
- Elevation: 26 m (85 ft)

Population (2021)
  - Total: 2,280
  - Density: 116/km^{2} (299/sq mi)
- Time zone: UTC+1 (CET)
  - Summer (DST): UTC+2 (CEST)
- Postal code: 5763
- Dialing code: 0492

Milheeze (dialect: Milles) is a village in the Dutch province of North Brabant and is part of the municipality of Gemert-Bakel.

The village was first mentioned in 1332 as Milleis. The etymology is unclear. Milheeze developed in the Late Middle Ages around a chapel. The chapel was replaced by the St Willibrordus Church in 1844-1845 which was built on the foundations of the chapel.

Milheeze was home to 579 people in 1840. The monastery Mariaoord was founded in Milheeze in 1935. The village was part of the municipality Bakel en Milheeze until 1966 when it was merged into Gemert-Bakel.

== Gallery ==
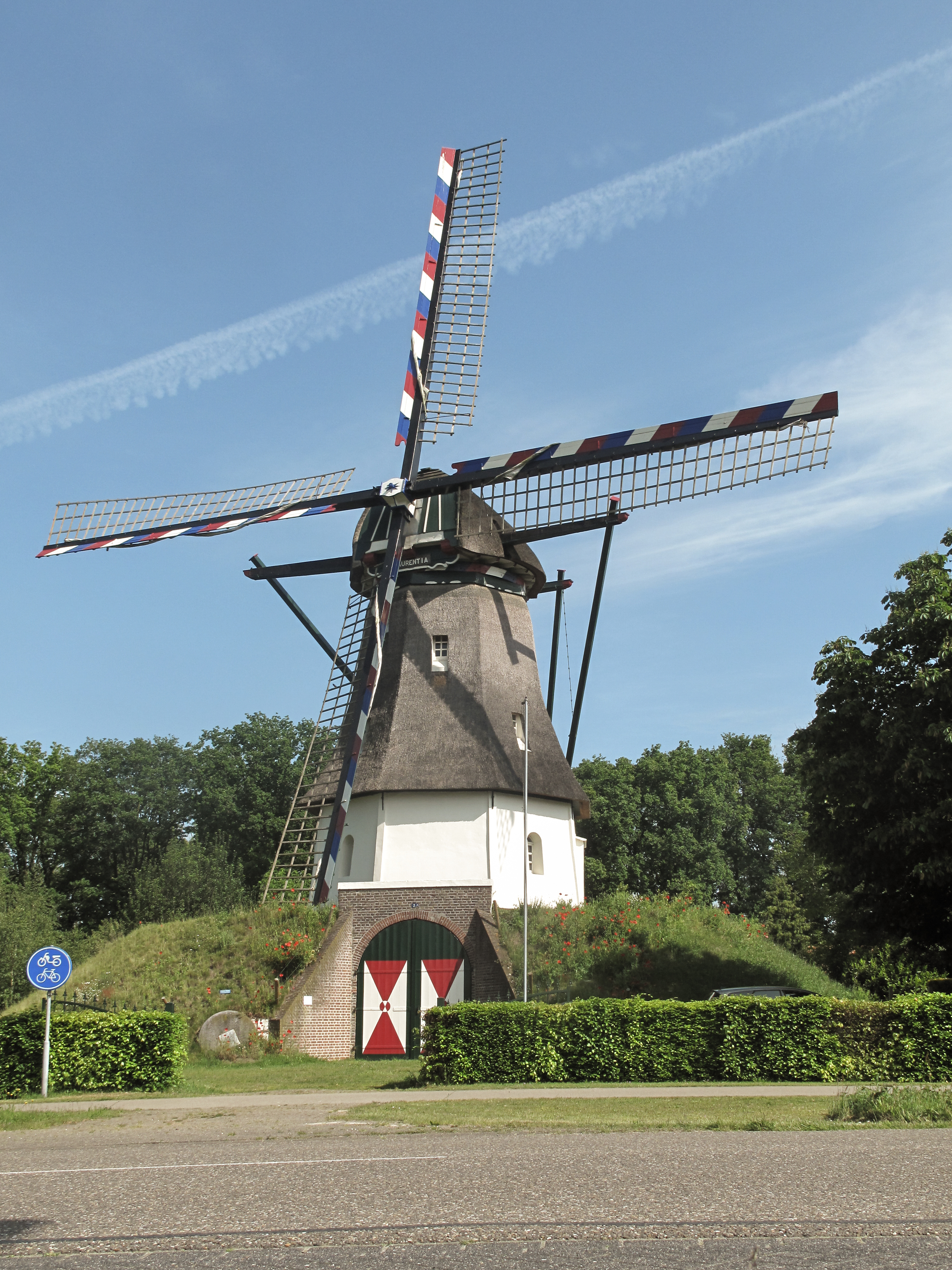
Wind mill Laurentiamolen

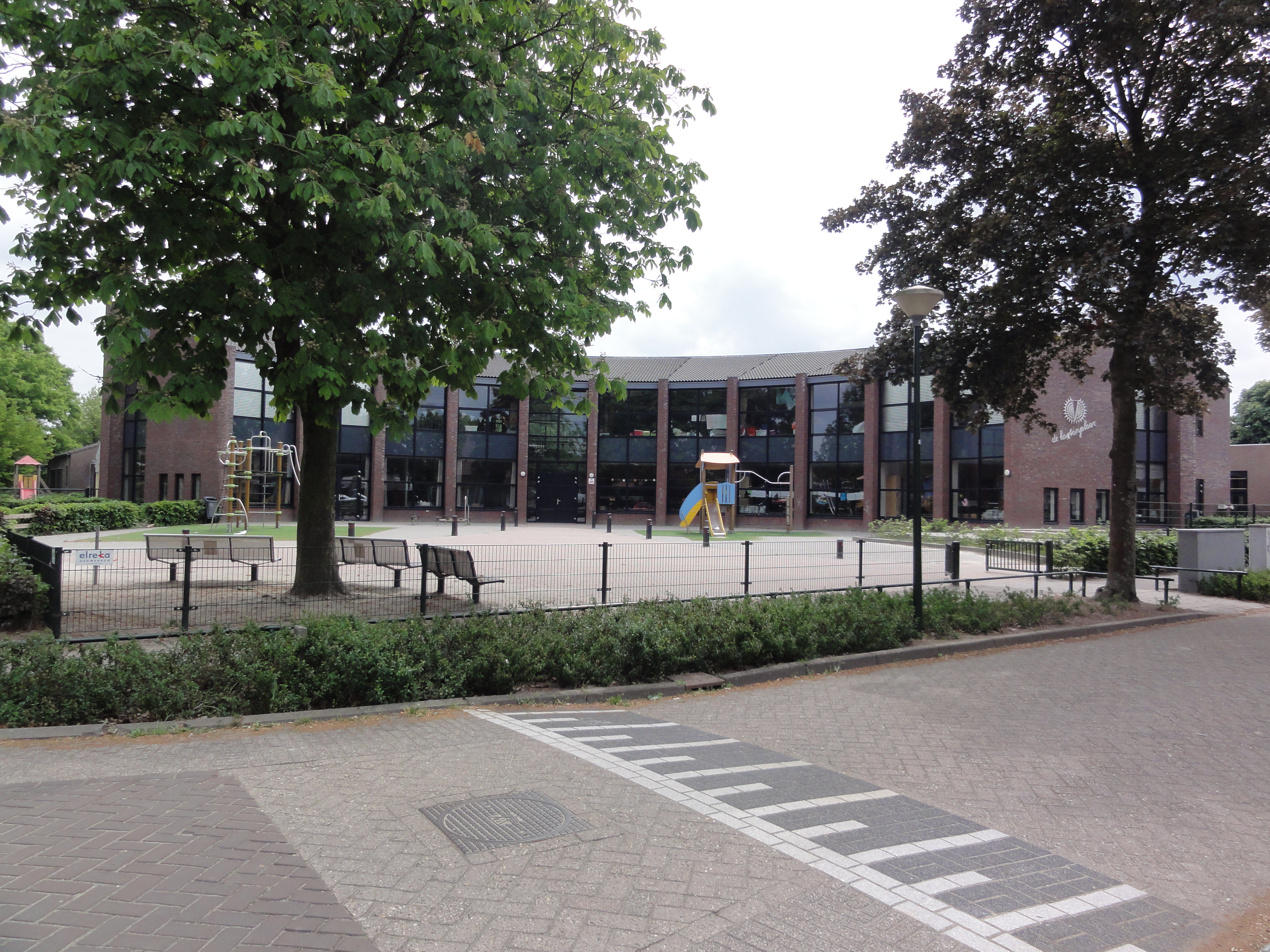
School in Milheeze
