= List of members of the House of Representatives of the Netherlands for People's Party for Freedom and Democracy =

The members of the House of Representatives of the Netherlands for People's Party for Freedom and Democracy is a list of all members of the House of Representatives who have been members of the People's Party for Freedom and Democracy parliamentary group.

== List ==
Member	Term start	Term end	Ref.
Gijs van Aardenne	18 February 1971	9 May 1971	
Gijs van Aardenne	3 August 1971	18 December 1977	
Gijs van Aardenne	27 August 1981	3 November 1982	
Thierry Aartsen	13 September 2018	18 June 2025	
Thierry Aartsen	12 November 2025	22 February 2026	
Jozias van Aartsen	19 May 1998	2 August 1998	
Jozias van Aartsen	23 May 2002	29 November 2006	
Charlie Aptroot	30 January 2003	20 September 2012	
Tamara van Ark	17 June 2010	26 October 2017	
Tamara van Ark	31 March 2021	3 September 2021	
Malik Azmani	17 June 2010	10 June 2019	
Hans van Baalen	28 September 1999	22 May 2002	
Hans van Baalen	31 January 2003	29 November 2006	
Eric Balemans	25 August 1998	22 May 2002	
Eric Balemans	3 June 2003	29 November 2006	
Bente Becker	23 March 2017	22 June 2019	
Bente Becker	13 October 2019	7 August 2022	
Bente Becker	28 November 2022	16 November 2026	
Willibrord van Beek	19 May 1998	20 September 2012	
Martin de Beer	26 June 2025	11 November 2025	
Martin de Beer	25 February 2026		
Pol de Beer	5 November 1969	13 September 1989	
Ybeltje Berckmoes-Duindam	9 November 2011	23 March 2017	
Cees Berkhouwer	6 November 1956	3 September 1979	
Harry Bevers	18 January 2022	5 December 2023	
Harry Bevers	4 July 2024	11 May 2026	
Bart Bikkers	26 March 2025	11 November 2025	
Bart Bikkers	25 February 2026		
Steven Edzo Broeils Bierema	28 January 1948 (Note: Was directly preceding a member of the House of Representatives for the Partij van de Vrijheid)	26 July 1948	
Jan Dirk Blaauw	16 January 1978	2 June 1986	
Jan Dirk Blaauw	27 September 1988	13 September 1989	
Jan Dirk Blaauw	9 May 1990	22 May 2002	
Jan Dirk Blaauw	26 July 2002	29 January 2003	
Piet Blauw	10 June 1981	18 May 1998	
Anke van Blerck-Woerdman	13 June 1995	29 January 2003	
Stef Blok	25 August 1998	22 May 2002	
Stef Blok	3 September 2002	5 November 2012	
Arend Jan Boekestijn	3 November 2006	18 November 2009	
Betty de Boer	17 June 2010	23 March 2017	
Frits Bolkestein	2 July 2020	30 March 2021	
Albert van den Bosch	23 March 2017	30 March 2021	
Remco Bosma	1 March 2016	23 March 2017	
André Bosman	17 June 2010	30 March 2021	
Reinier Braams	8 June 1977	13 September 1989	
Ruben Brekelmans	31 March 2021	1 July 2024	
Ruben Brekelmans	12 November 2025		
Jeanette ten Broecke Hoekstra	6 November 1956	21 February 1967	
Han ten Broeke	30 November 2006	4 September 2018	
Philippe Brood	25 August 1998	12 April 2000	
Jan Bruggeman	21 January 1985	2 June 1986	
Martijn Buijsse	4 July 2024	11 November 2025	
Brigitte van der Burg	30 November 2006	23 March 2017	
Eric van der Burg	6 December 2023	22 February 2026	
Ingrid de Caluwé	1 June 2011	23 March 2017	
Thom van Campen	31 March 2021		
Oussama Cherribi	17 May 1994	18 May 1998	
Oussama Cherribi	25 August 1998	22 May 2002	
Johan Gerard Hendrik Cornelissen	27 July 1948	4 June 1963	
Han Corver	16 June 1959	21 February 1967	
Jean Hubert Couzy	20 March 1959	21 February 1967	
Dick Dees	7 December 1972	13 July 1986	
Dick Dees	14 September 1989	12 June 1995	
Sander Dekker	23 March 2017	26 October 2017	
Norma Dettmeijer-Labberton	2 October 1968	9 May 1971	
Ineke Dezentjé Hamming-Bluemink	3 June 2003	9 November 2011	
Frederik Gerard van Dijk	6 November 1956	4 June 1963	
Klaas van Dijk	5 June 1963	23 August 1976	
Klaas Dijkhoff	17 June 2010	20 March 2015	
Klaas Dijkhoff	23 March 2017	30 March 2021	
Hans Dijkstal	11 November 1982	2 June 1986	
Hans Dijkstal	30 July 1986	21 August 1994	
Hans Dijkstal	19 May 1998	21 August 2002	
Remco Dijkstra	20 September 2012	30 March 2021	
Theo van den Doel	30 August 1994	22 May 2002	
Theo van den Doel	4 September 2002	29 January 2003	
Rosemarijn Dral	4 July 2024	11 November 2025	
Pieter Duisenberg	20 September 2012	6 September 2017	
Wim van Eekelen	8 June 1977	18 January 1978	
Wim van Eekelen	25 August 1981	4 November 1982	
Wim van Eekelen	3 June 1986	13 July 1986	
Eske van Egerschot	6 April 2004	29 November 2006	
Wendy van Eijk	6 December 2023		
Ton Elias	18 December 2008	23 March 2017	
Zohair El Yassini	23 March 2017	5 December 2023	
Ulysse Ellian	31 March 2021		
Silvio Erkens	31 March 2021	22 February 2026	
Broos van Erp	16 January 1978	2 June 1986	
Broos van Erp	30 July 1986	13 September 1989	
Broos van Erp	30 January 1990	1 June 1997	
Marijke van Essers-Huiskamp	17 May 1994	22 May 2002	
Albert-Jan Evenhuis	11 December 1973	13 July 1986	
Jeanne Fortanier-de Wit	28 January 1948	19 February 1956	
Jan Franssen	11 November 1982	6 September 1994	
Molly Geertsema	20 March 1959	5 July 1971	
Molly Geertsema	7 February 1973	5 May 1973	
Molly Geertsema	28 May 1973	8 November 1973	
Jan Geluk	19 May 1998	22 May 2002	
Jan Geluk	16 October 2002	29 June 2005	
Tobias van Gent	5 September 2018	30 March 2021	
Jock Geselschap	30 November 2016	23 March 2017	
Aart Geurtsen	27 June 1967	9 June 1981	
Nell Ginjaar-Maas	4 September 1973	4 November 1982	
Nell Ginjaar-Maas	3 June 1986	13 July 1986	
Nell Ginjaar-Maas	14 September 1989	24 September 1993	
Els de Graaff-van Meeteren	13 March 1986	2 June 1986	
Frank de Grave	16 September 1982	7 May 1990	
Frank de Grave	19 May 1998	2 August 1998	
Frank de Grave	23 May 2002	1 April 2004	
Martijn Grevink	23 August 2022	5 September 2022	
Martijn Grevink	6 September 2022	5 December 2023	
Laetitia Griffith	30 January 2003	2 June 2005	
Laetitia Griffith	1 June 2006	17 June 2010	
Dieke van Groningen	11 September 2025	11 November 2025	
Dieke van Groningen	12 May 2026	30 August 2026	
Dieke van Groningen	17 November 2026		
Peter de Groot	31 March 2021		
Aart Hendrik Willem Hacke	24 January 1948	26 July 1948	
Wybren van Haga	31 October 2017	24 September 2019 (Note: Continued as independent member.)	
Mark Harbers	1 December 2009	26 October 2017	
Mark Harbers	11 June 2019	9 January 2022	
Floris den Hartog	28 January 1948	4 June 1963	
Jeroen Hartsuiker	25 June 2025	11 November 2025	
Erik Haverkort	18 January 2022	5 December 2023	
Sari van Heemskerck Pillis-Duvekot	11 November 1982	2 June 1986	
Sari van Heemskerck Pillis-Duvekot	30 July 1986	18 May 1998	
Rudmer Heerema	3 September 2013	23 March 2017	
Rudmer Heerema	31 October 2017	5 December 2023	
Eelco Heinen	31 March 2021	1 July 2024	
Eelco Heinen	12 November 2025	22 February 2026	
Jeanine Hennis-Plasschaert	17 June 2010	5 November 2012	
Jeanine Hennis-Plasschaert	23 March 2017	12 September 2018	
Loek Hermans	8 June 1977	23 September 1990	
Loek Hermans	23 May 2002	24 July 2002	
Sophie Hermans	23 March 2017	1 July 2024	
Enric Hessing	17 May 1994	22 May 2002	
Jacqueline van den Hil	31 March 2021	5 December 2023	
Jacqueline van den Hil	12 December 2023	28 March 2024	
Jacqueline van den Hil	4 July 2024	13 May 2025	
Ayaan Hirsi Ali	30 January 2003	16 May 2006	
Pieter Hofstra	8 September 1994	29 November 2006	
Renate den Hollander	12 November 2025		
Henk van Hoof	5 November 1991	2 August 1998	
Henk van Hoof	23 May 2002	29 January 2003	
Hans Hoogervorst	17 May 1994	2 August 1998	
Hans Hoogervorst	23 May 2002	21 July 2002	
Hans Hoogervorst	30 January 2003	26 May 2003	
Johan Houwers	26 October 2010	20 September 2012	
Johan Houwers	8 November 2012	22 July 2013	
Matthijs Huizing	26 October 2010	6 December 2013	
Folkert Idsinga	31 March 2021	4 September 2023	
Huub Jacobse	8 June 1977	2 June 1986	
Annemarie Jorritsma-Lebbink	16 September 1982	2 June 1986	
Annemarie Jorritsma-Lebbink	30 July 1986	21 August 1994	
Annemarie Jorritsma-Lebbink	19 May 1998	2 August 1998	
Annemarie Jorritsma-Lebbink	23 May 2002	29 January 2003	
Cor Kammeraad	31 July 1963	21 February 1967	
Roelien Kamminga	31 March 2021	3 June 2025	
Henk Kamp	17 May 1994	21 July 2002	
Henk Kamp	30 January 2003	26 May 2003	
Henk Kamp	30 November 2006	18 December 2008	
Margreet Kamp	11 November 1982	2 June 1986	
Margreet Kamp	30 July 1986	13 September 1989	
Margreet Kamp	5 April 1990	18 May 1998	
Annelien Kappeyne van de Coppello	11 May 1971	9 June 1981	
Vincent Karremans	12 November 2025	22 February 2026	
Wim Keja	3 August 1971	2 June 1986	
Wim Keja	30 July 1986	13 September 1989	
Willem Keur	30 August 1994	18 May 1998	
Mike Keyzer	23 February 1967	17 April 1967	
Arend Kisteman	6 December 2023		
Jan Hendrik Klein Molekamp	30 August 1994	22 May 2002	
Jan Hendrik Klein Molekamp	26 July 2002	29 January 2003	
Jan Klink	2 June 2021	5 December 2023	
Daniel Koerhuis	23 March 2017	5 December 2023	
Henk Koning	23 February 1967	27 December 1977	
Henk Koning	25 August 1981	4 November 1982	
Henk Koning	3 June 1986	13 July 1986	
Henk Koning	14 September 1989	21 October 1991	
Bouke van der Kooij	11 November 1982	2 June 1986	
Sven Koopmans	23 March 2017	30 March 2021	
Daan de Kort	31 March 2021		
Rudolf de Korte	22 December 1977	12 March 1986	
Rudolf de Korte	3 June 1986	13 July 1986	
Rudolf de Korte	14 September 1989	31 August 1995	
Simon Korteweg	26 May 1959	4 June 1963	
Benk Korthals	16 September 1982	2 August 1998	
Benk Korthals	23 May 2002	21 July 2002	
Henk Korthals	28 January 1948	18 May 1959	
Frits Korthals Altes	14 September 1989	10 June 1991	
Hans de Koster	23 February 1967	11 June 1967	
Hans de Koster	11 May 1971	5 July 1971	
Hans de Koster	1 February 1973	30 April 1973	
Hans de Koster	28 May 1973	7 June 1977	
Gerard Koudijs	23 February 1967	6 December 1972	
Anneke Krijnen	22 December 1977	9 June 1981	
Paul de Krom	30 January 2003	14 October 2010	
Ada Kuiper-Struyk	26 May 1959	14 September 1965	
Antoinette Laan-Geselschap	31 October 2017	30 March 2021	
Leendert de Lange	31 March 2015	23 March 2017	
Leendert de Lange	31 October 2017	2 July 2019	
Herman Lauxtermann	8 June 1977	9 June 1981	
Herman Lauxtermann	11 November 1982	2 June 1986	
Herman Lauxtermann	27 January 1987	13 September 1989	
Herman Lauxtermann	25 June 1991	17 January 1993	
René Leegte	26 October 2010	24 March 2015	
Herman François van Leeuwen	15 July 1952	4 June 1963	
Janmarc Lenards	31 August 2005	29 November 2006	
Bart de Liefde	26 October 2010	19 February 2016	
Roald van der Linde	8 November 2012	23 March 2017	
Roald van der Linde	7 September 2017	30 March 2021	
Robin Linschoten	16 September 1982	21 August 1994	
Pieter Litjens	20 September 2012	25 June 2014	
Helma Lodders	17 June 2010	30 March 2021	
Anne-Wil Lucas	17 June 2010	6 September 2016	
Anne-Marie Lucassen-Stauttener	11 November 1982	2 June 1986	
Ruud Luchtenveld	26 August 1997	18 May 1998	
Ruud Luchtenveld	25 August 1998	22 May 2002	
Ruud Luchtenveld	26 July 2002	29 January 2003	
Ruud Luchtenveld	3 June 2003	27 June 2006	
Erik van der Maas	25 February 2026		
Nicole Maes	25 February 2026		
Claire Martens	6 December 2023		
Els Mayjer	25 August 1998	22 May 2002	
Cees Meeuwis	1 September 2009	17 June 2010	
Jaap Metz	22 November 1982	2 June 1986	
Wim Meulenkamp	6 December 2023	11 November 2025	
Wim Meulenkamp	25 February 2026		
Ingrid Michon-Derkzen	31 March 2021		
Jan Middendorp	23 March 2017	30 March 2021	
Anouchka van Miltenburg	30 January 2003	23 March 2017	
Fahid Minhas	31 March 2021	5 December 2023	
Perjan Moors	14 January 2014	23 March 2017	
Anne Mulder	17 June 2010	17 September 2020	
Alisha Müller	25 February 2026		
Daan de Neef	31 March 2021	5 September 2022	
Helma Neppérus	30 November 2006	23 March 2017	
Atzo Nicolaï	19 May 1998	21 July 2002	
Atzo Nicolaï	30 January 2003	26 May 2003	
Atzo Nicolaï	30 November 2006	31 May 2011	
Jacques Niederer	19 May 1998	22 May 2002	
Cora van Nieuwenhuizen-Wijbenga	17 June 2010	1 July 2014	
Ad Nijhuis	11 November 1982	2 June 1986	
Ad Nijhuis	30 July 1986	27 January 1990	
Chantal Nijkerken-de Haan	31 March 2015	30 March 2021	
Ed Nijpels	8 June 1977	13 July 1986	
Ed Nijpels	14 September 1989	3 April 1990	
Annette Nijs	30 January 2003	26 May 2003	
Annette Nijs	7 June 2005	29 November 2006	
Jurgen Nobel	12 November 2025		
Lambertus Gerhardus Oldenbanning	5 June 1963	15 September 1965	
Foort van Oosten	20 September 2012	19 February 2019	
Gert-Jan Oplaat	19 May 1998	22 May 2002	
Gert-Jan Oplaat	26 July 2002	29 November 2006	
Fadime Örgü	19 May 1998	22 May 2002	
Fadime Örgü	30 January 2003	29 November 2006	
Pieter Oud	27 July 1948	4 June 1963	
Greetje den Ouden-Dekkers	16 September 1982	2 June 1986	
Wim Passtoors	5 September 1995	22 May 2002	
Michiel Patijn	19 May 1998	31 March 2001	
Mariëlle Paul	31 March 2021	20 July 2023	
Mariëlle Paul	6 December 2023	1 July 2024	
Ad Ploeg	7 December 1972	7 November 1982	
Ad Ploeg	3 June 1986	13 September 1989	
Frits Portheine	31 July 1963	9 June 1981	
Hawre Rahimi	18 January 2022	5 December 2023	
Queeny Rajkowski	31 March 2021	7 December 2023	
Queeny Rajkowski	29 March 2024	30 March 2026	
Daniël van der Ree	7 September 2016	23 March 2017	
Kelly Regterschot	25 June 2019	30 March 2021	
Patricia Remak	19 May 1998	22 May 2002	
Johan Remkes	26 October 1993	2 August 1998	
Johan Remkes	23 May 2002	21 July 2002	
Johan Remkes	30 January 2003	26 May 2003	
Johan Remkes	30 November 2006	17 June 2010	
Len Rempt-Halmmans de Jongh	11 September 1979	9 June 1981	
Len Rempt-Halmmans de Jongh	11 May 1982	2 June 1986	
Len Rempt-Halmmans de Jongh	30 July 1986	13 September 1989	
Len Rempt-Halmmans de Jongh	25 September 1990	16 May 1994	
Jos van Rey	16 September 1982	13 September 1989	
Jos van Rey	11 January 1991	18 May 1998	
Simone Richardson	6 September 2022	27 October 2022	
Simone Richardson	1 November 2022	27 November 2022	
Simone Richardson	5 September 2023	5 December 2023	
Simone Richardson	4 June 2025	11 November 2025	
Koos Rietkerk	23 February 1967	27 July 1971	
Koos Rietkerk	23 January 1973	31 August 1973	
Koos Rietkerk	11 September 1974	3 November 1982	
Jan Rijpstra	17 May 1994	31 July 2005	
Govert Ritmeester	27 July 1948	4 June 1963	
Arno Rutte	20 September 2012	12 October 2019	
Mark Rutte	30 January 2003	26 May 2003	
Mark Rutte	28 June 2006	14 October 2010	
Mark Rutte	20 September 2012	5 November 2012	
Mark Rutte	23 March 2017	26 October 2017	
Mark Rutte	31 March 2021	9 January 2022	
Ed van der Sande	30 June 2005	29 November 2006	
Afke Schaart	17 June 2010	20 September 2012	
Jaap Scherpenhuizen	23 January 1973	7 November 1982	
Jaap Scherpenhuizen	3 June 1986	13 September 1989	
Anton van Schijndel	30 August 2005	6 September 2006	
Edith Schippers	3 June 2003	14 October 2010	
Edith Schippers	20 September 2012	5 November 2012	
Johan Schlingemann	9 May 1967	7 February 1971	
Eegje Schoo	3 June 1986	19 January 1987	
Dirk Schuitemaker	20 March 1959	4 June 1963	
Melanie Maas Geesteranus	30 January 2003	26 May 2003	
Anoushka Schut-Welkzijn	20 September 2012	23 March 2017	
Björn Schütz	12 November 2025		
Chris Simons	22 March 2022	8 July 2022	
Chris Simons	23 August 2022	5 December 2023	
Bart Smals	3 July 2019	12 October 2019	
Bart Smals	15 October 2019	30 March 2021	
Bart Smals	7 September 2021	5 December 2023	
Neelie Smit-Kroes	3 August 1971	27 December 1977	
Neelie Smit-Kroes	25 August 1981	3 November 1982	
Neelie Smit-Kroes	3 June 1986	13 July 1986	
Janneke Snijder-Hazelhoff	7 December 1999	22 May 2002	
Janneke Snijder-Hazelhoff	3 June 2003	20 September 2012	
Mark Snoeren	22 September 2020	30 March 2021	
Haya van Someren-Downer	20 March 1959	30 September 1968	
Ernst van Splunter	3 April 2001	22 May 2002	
Ard van der Steur	17 June 2010	20 March 2015	
Anne Lize van der Stoel	17 May 1994	18 May 1998	
Joke Stoffels-van Haaften	22 December 1955	21 February 1967	
Karin Straus	26 October 2010	23 March 2017	
Pim van Strien	31 March 2021	5 December 2023	
Mark Strolenberg	7 September 2021	5 December 2023	
Ton de Swart	9 May 2000	22 May 2002	
Zsolt Szabó	3 June 2003	29 November 2006	
Joost Taverne	26 October 2010	19 September 2012	
Joost Taverne	8 November 2012	23 March 2017	
Fred Teeven	30 November 2006	14 October 2010	
Fred Teeven	20 September 2012	5 November 2012	
Fred Teeven	26 March 2015	23 March 2017	
Ockje Tellegen	20 September 2012	17 March 2022	
Erica Terpstra	8 June 1977	21 August 1994	
Erica Terpstra	19 May 1998	14 December 2003	
Judith Tielen	31 October 2017	18 June 2025	
Edzo Toxopeus	6 November 1956	18 May 1959	
Edzo Toxopeus	2 July 1963	23 July 1963	
Edzo Toxopeus	21 September 1965	31 October 1969	
Max Tripels	19 January 1978	2 June 1986	
Danny Tuijnman	5 June 1963	18 December 1977	
Thijs Udo	25 August 1998	22 May 2002	
Peter Valstar	31 March 2021	5 December 2023	
Els Veder-Smit	23 February 1967	2 January 1978	
Michiel van Veen	20 September 2012	29 November 2016	
Binne Pieter van der Veen	20 March 1959	4 June 1963	
Jelleke Veenendaal	16 December 2003	29 November 2006	
Jan te Veldhuis	16 September 1982	29 January 2003	
Hayke Veldman	25 June 2014	23 March 2017	
Hayke Veldman	31 October 2017	30 March 2021	
Hester Veltman-Kamp	6 December 2023	11 November 2025	
Jan van de Ven	24 August 1976	9 June 1981	
Nellie Verbugt	19 January 1993	22 May 2002	
Nellie Verbugt	26 July 2002	29 January 2003	
Rita Verdonk	30 November 2006	14 September 2007	
Mark Verheijen	20 September 2012	27 February 2015	
Ruud Verkuijlen	7 September 2021	11 January 2022	
Ruud Verkuijlen	18 January 2022	5 December 2023	
Ruud Verkuijlen	14 May 2025	11 November 2025	
Ruud Verkuijlen	31 March 2026	20 July 2026	
Ruud Verkuijlen	2 September 2026		
Barbara Visser	20 September 2012	16 October 2017	
Martin Visser	4 March 1958	21 February 1967	
Arno Visser	3 June 2003	29 November 2006	
Henk Vonhoff	23 February 1967	27 July 1971	
Henk Vonhoff	23 January 1973	5 September 1974	
Gijsbertus Vonk	28 January 1948	14 July 1952	
Jan de Voogd	22 December 1977	9 June 1981	
Joris Voorhoeve	16 September 1982	9 January 1991	
Joris Voorhoeve	19 May 1998	30 November 1999	
Otto Vos	30 August 1994	18 May 1998	
Otto Vos	25 August 1998	22 May 2002	
Hella Voûte-Droste	17 May 1994	3 September 2002	
Aukje de Vries	8 November 2012	9 January 2022	
Aukje de Vries	6 December 2023	4 September 2025	
Bibi de Vries	17 May 1994	29 November 2006	
Monique de Vries	17 May 1994	2 August 1998	
Monique de Vries	23 May 2002	29 January 2003	
Gijs de Vries	23 May 2002	7 October 2002	
Harry Waalkens	3 August 1971	16 January 1985	
Christianne van der Wal	6 December 2023	25 March 2025	
Frans Weekers	19 May 1998	22 May 2002	
Frans Weekers	3 June 2003	14 October 2010	
Frans Weekers	20 September 2012	5 November 2012	
Hilde Wendel	12 November 2025		
Frans Weisglas	16 September 1982	29 November 2006	
Arne Weverling	23 March 2017	30 March 2021	
Jan-Kees Wiebenga	16 September 1982	16 May 1994	
Hans Wiegel	18 April 1967	18 December 1977	
Hans Wiegel	25 August 1981	30 April 1982	
Dennis Wiersma	23 March 2017	2 September 2021	
Jeroen van Wijngaarden	1 July 2014	23 March 2017	
Jeroen van Wijngaarden	20 February 2019	5 December 2023	
Geert Wilders	25 August 1998	22 May 2002	
Geert Wilders	26 July 2002	1 September 2004	
Johan Witteveen	5 June 1963	23 July 1963	
Johan Witteveen	21 September 1965	4 April 1967	
Martin Wörsdörfer	23 March 2017	30 March 2021	
Hatte van der Woude	31 March 2021	5 December 2023	
Bas van 't Wout	20 September 2012	1 July 2020	
Bas van 't Wout	31 March 2021	12 January 2022	
Dilan Yeşilgöz-Zegerius	23 March 2017	2 September 2021	
Dilan Yeşilgöz-Zegerius	6 December 2023	22 February 2026	
Gerrit Zalm	19 May 1998	2 August 1998	
Gerrit Zalm	23 May 2002	26 May 2003	
Roelof Zegering Hadders	27 July 1948	9 May 1971	
Erik Ziengs	17 June 2010	30 March 2021	
Halbe Zijlstra	30 November 2006	14 October 2010	
Halbe Zijlstra	20 September 2012	26 October 2017	
