= Ockje Tellegen =

Dutch politician

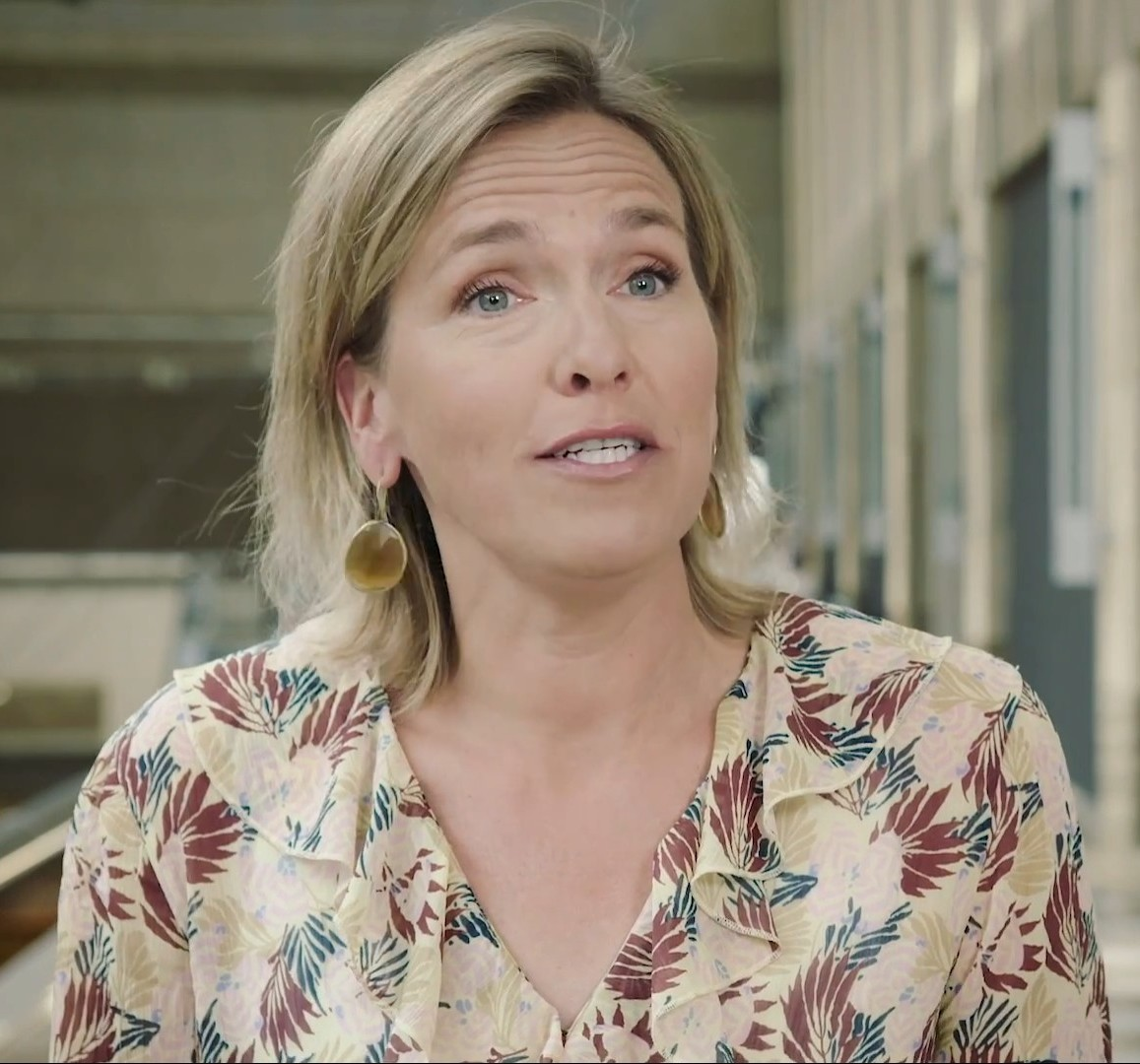
- Ockje Tellegen, 2018

Member of the House of Representatives
- In office 20 September 2012 – 22 March 2022

Personal details
- Born: 16 October 1974 (age 51) Delft, Netherlands
- Party: People's Party for Freedom and Democracy
- Occupation: Politician

Ockje Caroline Tellegen (born 16 October 1974) is a Dutch politician who served as a member of the House of Representatives from September 2012 to March 2022. A member of the People's Party for Freedom and Democracy (VVD), she served as first deputy speaker and as chair of the committee on Education, Culture and Science from 2017.

Tellegen worked as a policy officer at the Ministry of Foreign Affairs and later was stationed at the Dutch embassy in Berlin. She then became political assistant to Atzo Nicolaï from 2006 to 2012. Tellegen became a member of the House of Representatives on 20 September 2012. She was party secretary of the VVD from 31 October 2017 and was also the first deputy speaker of the House of Representatives.

Tellegen collided with Sylvana Simons during a committee meeting in December 2021. She wanted to point out that Party for Freedom MP Harm Beertema had made comments outside the microphone that she experienced as intimidating. Tellegen then reprimanded her, after which Simons filed a complaint. Speaker of the House Vera Bergkamp later defended Tellegen's actions in a letter.

Tellegen went on sick leave on 22 March 2022 and was replaced by Chris Simons until 9 July. After the summer recess she was replaced by Martijn Grevink from 23 August. She did not return to the House of Representatives after her sick leave due to burnout.

== Electoral history ==
Electoral history of Ockje Tellegen
Year	Body	Party	Pos.	Votes	Result		Ref.
Year	Body	Party	Pos.	Votes	Party seats	Individual	Ref.
2021	House of Representatives	People's Party for Freedom and Democracy	10	3,600	34 / 150	Won	
2026	The Hague Municipal Council	People's Party for Freedom and Democracy	48 (Note: Tellegen participated as a lijstduwer.)	116	3 / 45	Lost	
