= Hanneke Boerma =

Dutch diplomat and politician (born 1975)

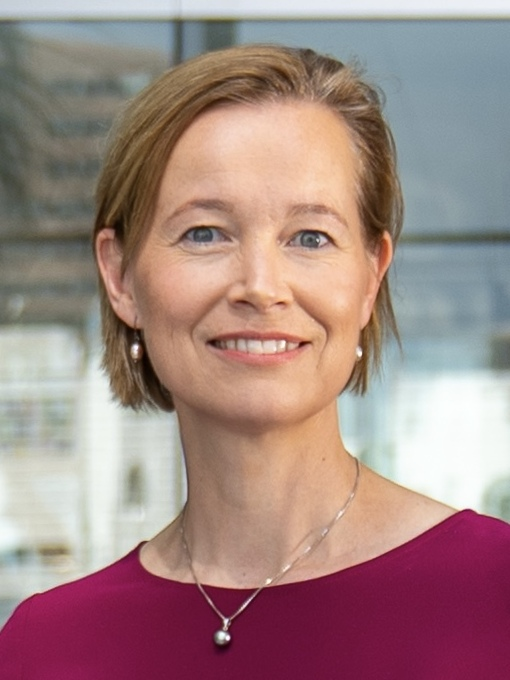
- Boerma in 2025

State Secretary for Foreign Trade
- In office 19 June 2025 – 22 August 2025
- Prime Minister: Dick Schoof
- Preceded by: Reinette Klever (as minister)
- Succeeded by: Aukje de Vries

Personal details
- Born: 22 January 1975 (age 51) Winschoten, Netherlands
- Party: New Social Contract
- Education: University of Groningen; College of Europe

J. C. "Hanneke" Boerma (born 22 January 1975) is a Dutch diplomat and politician. A member of the New Social Contract (NSC) party, she briefly served as State Secretary for Foreign Trade between June and August 2025.

== Biography ==
Boerma studied law at the University of Groningen. She subsequently obtained a Master of Laws from the College of Europe in Bruges. After graduating, Boerma worked as a policy officer at the Ministry of Economic Affairs, Directorate for European Integration and the Internal Market. From 2003 to 2006, she worked at the Directorate-General for European Integration of the Ministry of Foreign Affairs. From 2007 to 2010, she was Second Secretary at the Dutch Embassy in Pretoria, South Africa; from 2010 to 2013, First Secretary at the Permanent Mission of the Netherlands to the United Nations in New York City. From 2013 to 2016, she was Cluster Coordinator for the Middle East Peace Process at the Ministry.

In 2017, Boerma was appointed deputy head of the interdepartmental Brexit task force; in that role, she was responsible for the new relationship between the European Union and the United Kingdom. From 2020 to 2025, she worked at the Permanent Representation of the Kingdom of the Netherlands to the European Union as head of the team responsible for contact with the European Parliament.

On 19 June 2025, Boerma was appointed State Secretary at the Ministry of Foreign Affairs, responsible for Foreign Trade. She took over this portfolio from then-Minister for Foreign Trade and Development Aid Reinette Klever, who had resigned when the Party for Freedom (PVV) withdrew its support for the Schoof cabinet. Three months later, she resigned from the cabinet together with the other NSC members because the cabinet decided not to implement additional measures against Israel over its actions in Gaza and plans to build settlements in the occupied West Bank.
