= Sjoerd Sjoerdsma =

Dutch diplomat and politician (born 1981)

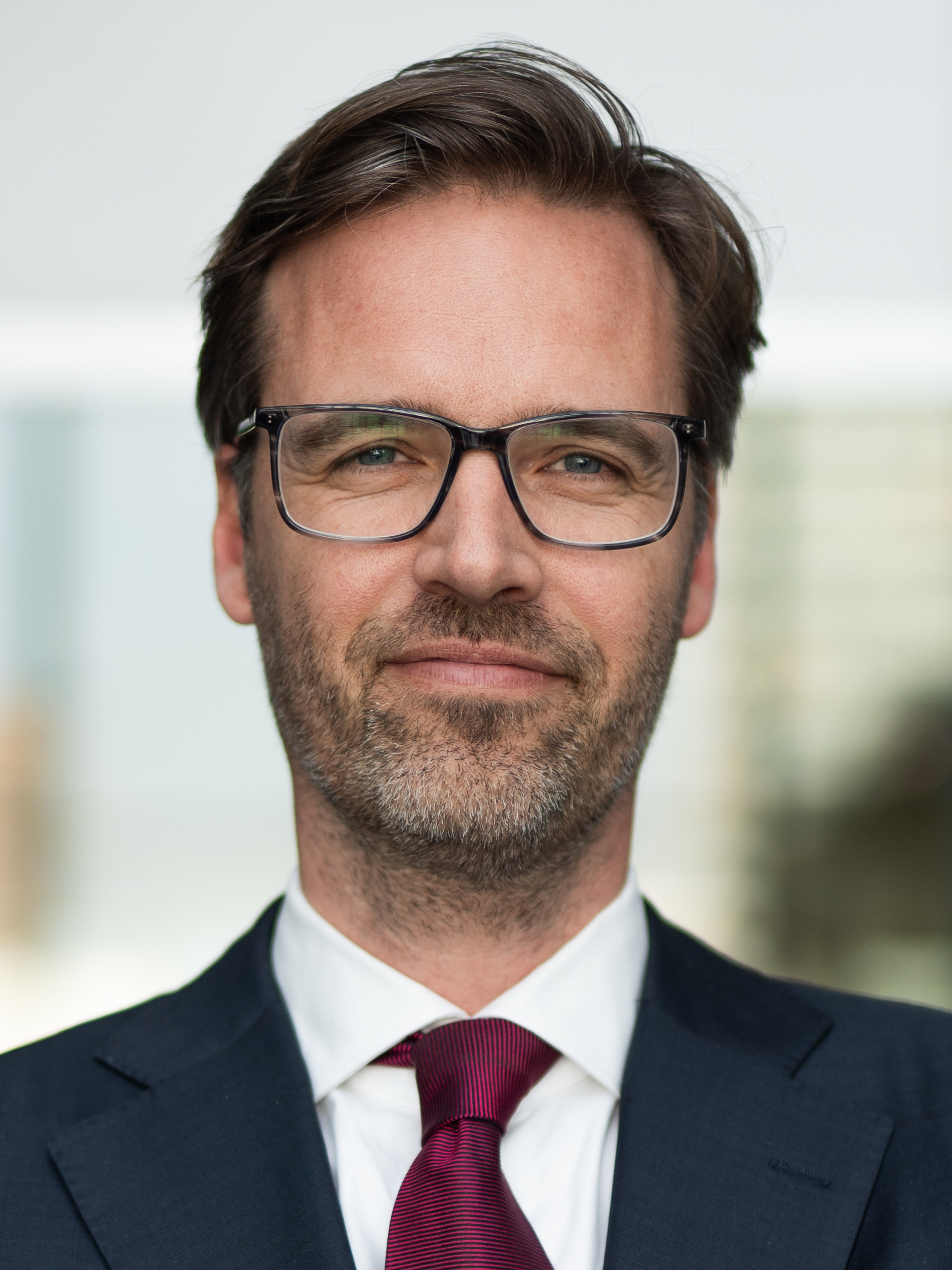
- Sjoerdsma in 2026

Minister of Foreign Trade and Development Cooperation
- Incumbent
- Assumed office 23 February 2026
- Prime Minister: Rob Jetten
- Preceded by: Aukje de Vries (State Secretary for Foreign Trade)

Member of the House of Representatives
- In office 20 September 2012 – 5 December 2023

Personal details
- Born: Sjoerd Wiemer Sjoerdsma; 10 July 1981 (age 45) Eindhoven, Netherlands
- Party: Democrats 66
- Education: University College Utrecht; London School of Economics; Utrecht University
- Occupation: Politician; diplomat

Sjoerd Wiemer Sjoerdsma (born 10 July 1981) is a Dutch diplomat and politician who has served as Minister of Foreign Trade and Development Cooperation since February 2026 in the Jetten cabinet. A member of the Democrats 66 (D66) party, he previously served as a member of the House of Representatives from September 2012 to December 2023.

== Career ==
Prior to his election to Parliament in 2012 Sjoerdsma worked for the Ministry of Foreign Affairs. During this period he was posted as a diplomat to the Dutch embassy in Afghanistan and to the permanent representation to the Palestinian Authority.

=== House of Representatives (2012–2023) ===
Sjoerdsma in 2017

Sjoerdsma served three terms in Parliament before declining to run for reelection. In Parliament, he served as his party's spokesperson for foreign affairs. In addition to his committee assignments, he was a member of the Dutch delegation to the NATO Parliamentary Assembly.

In February 2024, during the Russian invasion of Ukraine, he was awarded the Order of Merit by the latter country for his unwavering support. He had called on the Dutch government to assist Ukraine by providing F-16 fighter jets, which it eventually did.

=== In government (2026–present) ===
In 2026 Sjoerdsma was appointed Minister of Foreign Trade and Development Cooperation within the Ministry of Foreign Affairs in the newly-installed cabinet of Prime Minister Rob Jetten.

In May 2026 responding to possible US extraterritorial legislation that would target ASML, a Dutch multinational company which manufactures photolithography machines, Sjoerdsma rejected the proposed measures and stated the Netherlands would remain sovereign in the laws enforced on its soil.

== Political positions ==
In 2019, Sjoerdsma publicly criticised Queen Máxima of the Netherlands over a meeting she held with Saudi Crown Prince Mohammed bin Salman on the sidelines of the 2019 G20 Osaka summit without raising the assassination of journalist Jamal Khashoggi.

Sjoerdsma is an outspoken critic of China's human rights abuses in Xinjiang. In March 2021, the Chinese government banned Sjoerdsma from entering mainland China and conducting business with Chinese firms in retaliation for European Union-imposed sanctions against four Chinese officials for their roles in perpetrating persecution of Uyghurs in China.

== Decorations ==
Honours
Ribbon bar	Honour	Country	Date	Ref.
	Knight of the Order of Orange-Nassau	Netherlands	5 December 2023	

== Electoral history ==
Electoral history of Sjoerd Sjoerdsma
Year	Body	Party	Pos.	Votes	Result		Ref.
Year	Body	Party	Pos.	Votes	Party seats	Individual	Ref.
2012	House of Representatives	Democrats 66	11	1,569	12	Won	
2017	House of Representatives	Democrats 66	11	2,726	19	Won	
2021	House of Representatives	Democrats 66	4	4,929	24	Won	
