= Ruud Verkuijlen =

Dutch politician (born 1960)

Member of the House of Representatives
- Incumbent
- Assumed office 31 March 2026
- Preceded by: Queeny Rajkowski
- In office 14 May 2025 – 11 November 2025
- In office 18 January 2022 – 5 December 2023
- Preceded by: Mark Rutte
- In office 7 September 2021 – 11 January 2022
- Preceded by: Jan Klink
- Succeeded by: Hawre Rahimi

Member of the Hilversum municipal council
- In office 27 March 2014 – 15 September 2021
- Succeeded by: Ellis Zeeuw van der Laan

Personal details
- Born: Rudolf Verkuijlen; 13 October 1960 (age 65) Amsterdam, Netherlands
- Party: People's Party for Freedom and Democracy
- Children: 2
- Education: Netherlands School of Public Administration
- Occupation: Police commissioner; civil servant; politician

Rudolf "Ruud" Verkuijlen (born 13 October 1960) is a Dutch police commissioner, civil servant, and politician. A member of the conservative liberal People's Party for Freedom and Democracy (VVD), he was appointed to the House of Representatives in September 2021 after having participated in the 2021 general election. He lost his bid for re-election in November 2023, but he later served as a member of parliament for two short periods. He previously worked for the National Police and served on the Hilversum municipal council in the years 2014–21.

== Early life and career ==
Verkuijlen was born in 1960 in Amsterdam and grew up in its western borough. His father was the president of a trade organization. Verkuijlen joined the Amsterdam police force in 1986, working at its Lijnbaansgracht police station and rose to the rank of chief inspector. He left the Amsterdam police in 2005 in favor of the Ministry of the Interior and Kingdom Relations to head the services and contracts department for C2000, the communications system used by Dutch emergency services. Three years later, he became leader of the police profession department of the Nederlands Politie Instituut (Dutch police institute) in Zeist. Verkuijlen followed an executive master in police management at the Netherlands School of Public Administration starting in 2009, and he was the manager of the violence against police officers and public services program at the Ministry of the Interior and Kingdom Relations between 2010 and 2012. Verkuijlen started serving as the National Police's head of research and development in the latter year. He filled that post until he became manager of the violence against police officers program and New Year coordinator in 2016.

Verkuijlen reacted disappointed when the third Rutte cabinet stated in 2018 that it was against prohibiting firecrackers and skyrockets around New Year's Day. He argued it would have solved a large part of the aggression and violence against the police during that period. He clarified that he did not find a ban on all consumer fireworks necessary. Verkuijlen later called on mayors to force people who have been caught with illegal fireworks in the past to report to their local police station on New Year's Eve to prevent them from causing unrest. The following year, amidst an increasing number of reports of violence against police officers, Verkuijlen said he thought that society was having behavioral issues and that people were getting more and more short-tempered. He also pled for additional legislation against doxing because of its danger to police officers.

== Politics ==
Verkuijlen was elected to the Hilversum municipal council in 2014 after he was placed fourth on the VVD's party list. His focus was on security, and he promoted the creation of neighborhood WhatsApp group chats to prevent and solve crime. He also expressed his opposition to plans to experiment with the legal cultivation of cannabis in the municipality, saying it would not bring an end to illegal cultivation due to export opportunities. Verkuijlen became chair of the VVD's thematic network Justice and Security in November 2017, and he was re-elected to the Hilversum council in 2018 as the VVD's fourth candidate. He started serving as one of three deputy speakers of the Hilversum council in 2019. As a councilor, Verkuijlen called on the Hilversum hospitality industry to create a blacklist with sexual assaulters.

=== House of Representatives ===
He ran for member of parliament in the March 2021 general election as the VVD's 39th candidate and received 547 preference votes. He was not elected, as his party won 34 seats. Later that year, Verkuijlen was appointed to the House of Representatives as a temporary member because of a vacancy, and he was sworn in on 7 September. Bas van 't Wout had gone on sick leave due to an occupational burnout on 2 June and was being temporarily replaced by Jan Klink; Klink, however, became a permanent member of parliament when Dilan Yeşilgöz-Zegerius stepped down, leaving a seat for Verkuijlen. Verkuijlen left the Hilversum municipal council a week after his House appointment. He is on the Committees for Education, Culture and Science; for Justice and Security; and for Health, Welfare and Sport. He serves as the VVD's spokesperson for human trafficking, prostitution, tackling recidivism, crime prevention, judicial youth policy, the child welfare council, the Council for the Administration of Criminal Justice and Protection of Juveniles, and Malaysia Airlines Flight 17. Van 't Wout's sick leave was supposed to expire after 22 September, but it was extended to 11 January 2022, bringing an end to Verkuijlen's House membership. However, he was again sworn in as a House member the following week after Mark Rutte had resigned to serve as prime minister in the fourth Rutte cabinet.

Verkuijlen stirred controversy with his maiden speech, which he held on 12 May 2022 during a debate about care orders for children of victims of the childcare benefits scandal. A maiden speech is traditionally not interrupted by questions or comments from other members of parliaments. However, due to the sensitive nature of the subject and due to the VVD having received blame for the scandal, other House members had asked Verkuijlen to deviate from this tradition to allow for a debate. Verkuijlen refused, leading to victims of the scandal leaving the public gallery in protest. He later called it an error of judgement on his part and returned to the lectern to answer questions.

Verkuijlen served another term in the House starting on 31 March 2026, replacing Queeny Rajkowski during her maternity leave.

== Personal life ==
Verkuijlen has been living in Hilversum since 1996 and lived in Amsterdam before. He has a wife named Marlies and two daughters.

== Electoral history ==
Electoral history of Ruud Verkuijlen
Year	Body	Party	Pos.	Votes	Result		Ref.
Year	Body	Party	Pos.	Votes	Party seats	Individual	Ref.
2021	House of Representatives	People's Party for Freedom and Democracy	39	547	34	Lost (Note: Verkuijlen was appointed to the body later during the term due to a vacancy.)	
2023	House of Representatives	People's Party for Freedom and Democracy	31	534	24	Lost	
2025	House of Representatives	People's Party for Freedom and Democracy	29	397	22	Lost	
