= Albert-Jan Evenhuis =

Dutch politician (1941-2011)

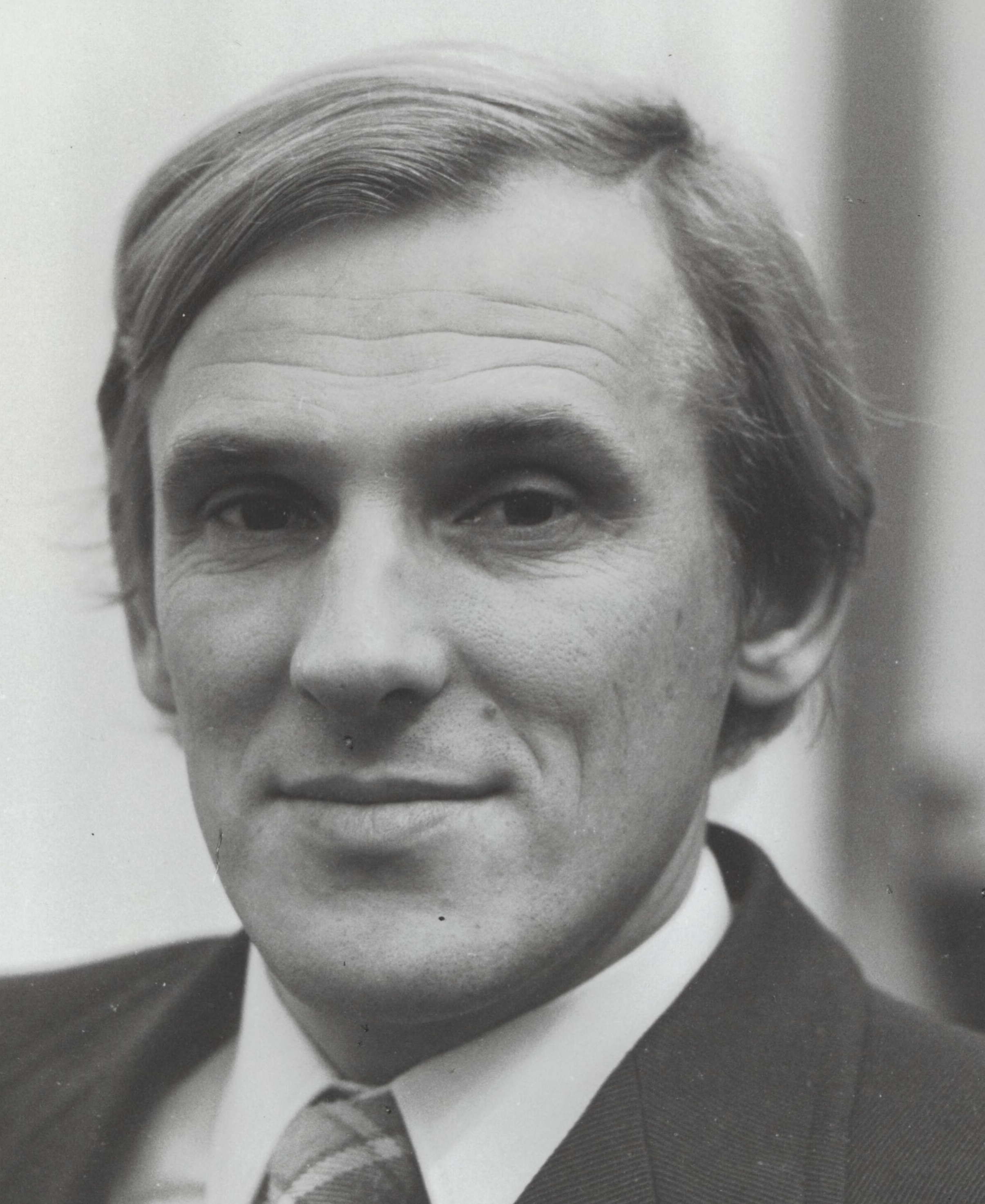
- Evenhuis in 1976

State Secretary for Economic Affairs
- In office 14 July 1986 – 30 June 1989
- Prime Minister: Ruud Lubbers
- Minister: Rudolf de Korte
- Preceded by: Piet van Zeil
- Succeeded by: –

Member of the House of Representatives
- In office 11 December 1973 – 14 July 1986

Personal details
- Born: 8 December 1941 Noord-Sleen, Netherlands
- Died: 13 January 2011 (aged 69) Doetinchem, Netherlands
- Party: People's Party for Freedom and Democracy
- Occupation: Politician

Albert-Jan Evenhuis (8 December 1941 – 13 January 2011) was a Dutch politician for the People's Party for Freedom and Democracy (VVD).

== See also ==
- List of members of the House of Representatives of the Netherlands for People's Party for Freedom and Democracy

Political offices
Preceded by Piet van Zeil	State Secretary for Economic Affairs; 1986–1989	Succeeded by –
