= Jock Geselschap =

Dutch politician (born 1969)

Member of the House of Representatives
- In office 30 November 2016 – 23 March 2017

Personal details
- Born: 28 July 1969 (age 55)
- Political party: People's Party for Freedom and Democracy

Jock H. Geselschap (born 28 July 1969) is a Dutch politician. He was a member of the House of Representatives of the Netherlands for the People's Party for Freedom and Democracy between 30 November 2016 and 23 March 2017. He replaced Michiel van Veen. Earlier, he served as diplomat and as local politician in Rotterdam.

== Career ==
Geselschap was born on 28 July 1969. He worked as lawyer in the Hague from 1996 to 2001. He subsequently worked as diplomat for the Dutch Ministry of Foreign Affairs at positions in Pretoria and the Permanent Representation of the Netherlands to the United Nations in New York. From 2007 to 2008 he worked for the Commission of European Affairs of the House of Representatives. From 2008 to 2010 he was the civil servant responsible for relations between members of the government and parliament for the Ministry of Foreign Affairs.

In 2010 Geselschap was elected to the Rotterdam deelgemeente of Kralingen-Crooswijk. From April 2010 to April 2014 he served as its alderman for finance, public space, transport and local economy. He subsequently returned to working for the Ministry of Foreign Affairs on an assignment for the Rijksdienst voor Ondernemend Nederland.

Geselschap was number 58 on the People's Party for Freedom and Democracy list for the 2012 Dutch general election. On 30 November 2016 Michiel van Veen left the House of Representatives to become mayor of Gemert-Bakel, Geselschap replaced him in the House. With only eight weeks of parliamentary work remaining until the 2017 general election, Geselschap referred to his appearance in the House as "a substitute in injury time". Geselschap was not a candidate in the 2017 elections, while his wife Antoinette Laan-Geselschap was. Geselschap returned to the Ministry of Foreign Affairs after his term in the House ended on 23 March 2017.
