= Ad Ploeg =

Dutch politician (1927–1994)

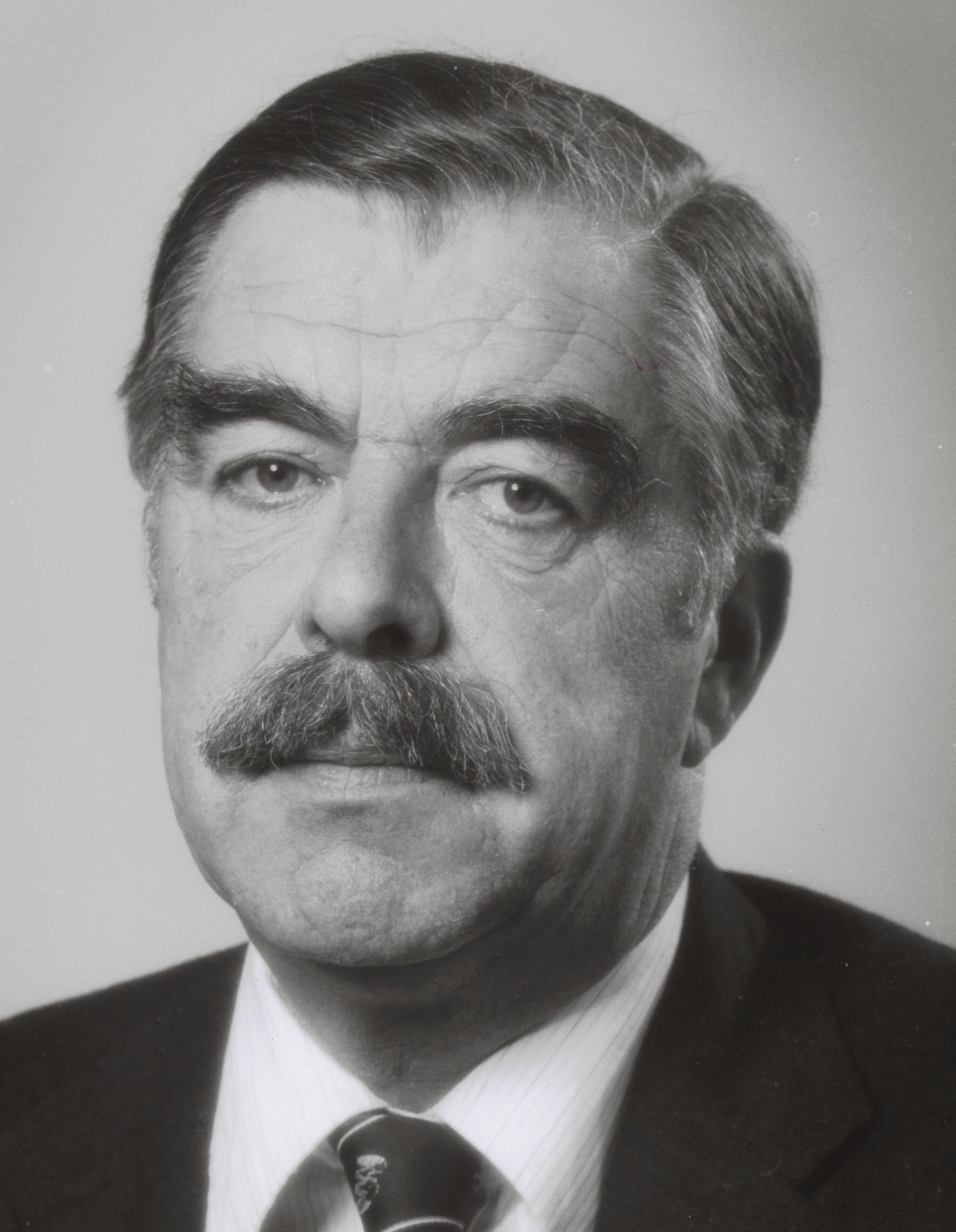
- Ploeg in 1982

State Secretary for Agriculture and Fisheries
- In office 8 November 1982 – 14 July 1986
- Prime Minister: Ruud Lubbers
- Minister: Gerrit Braks
- Preceded by: –
- Succeeded by: –

Member of the House of Representatives
- In office 7 December 1972 – 7 November 1982
- In office 3 June 1986 – 13 September 1989

Personal details
- Born: 17 April 1927 Breda, Netherlands
- Died: 5 July 1994 (aged 67) Arnhem, Netherlands
- Party: People's Party for Freedom and Democracy
- Occupation: Politician

Ad Ploeg (17 April 1927 – 5 July 1994) was a Dutch politician for the People's Party for Freedom and Democracy (VVD).

== See also ==
- List of members of the House of Representatives of the Netherlands for People's Party for Freedom and Democracy

Political offices
Preceded by –	State Secretary for Agriculture and Fisheries; 1982–1986	Succeeded by –
