= Jaap Scherpenhuizen =

Dutch politician (1934-2012)

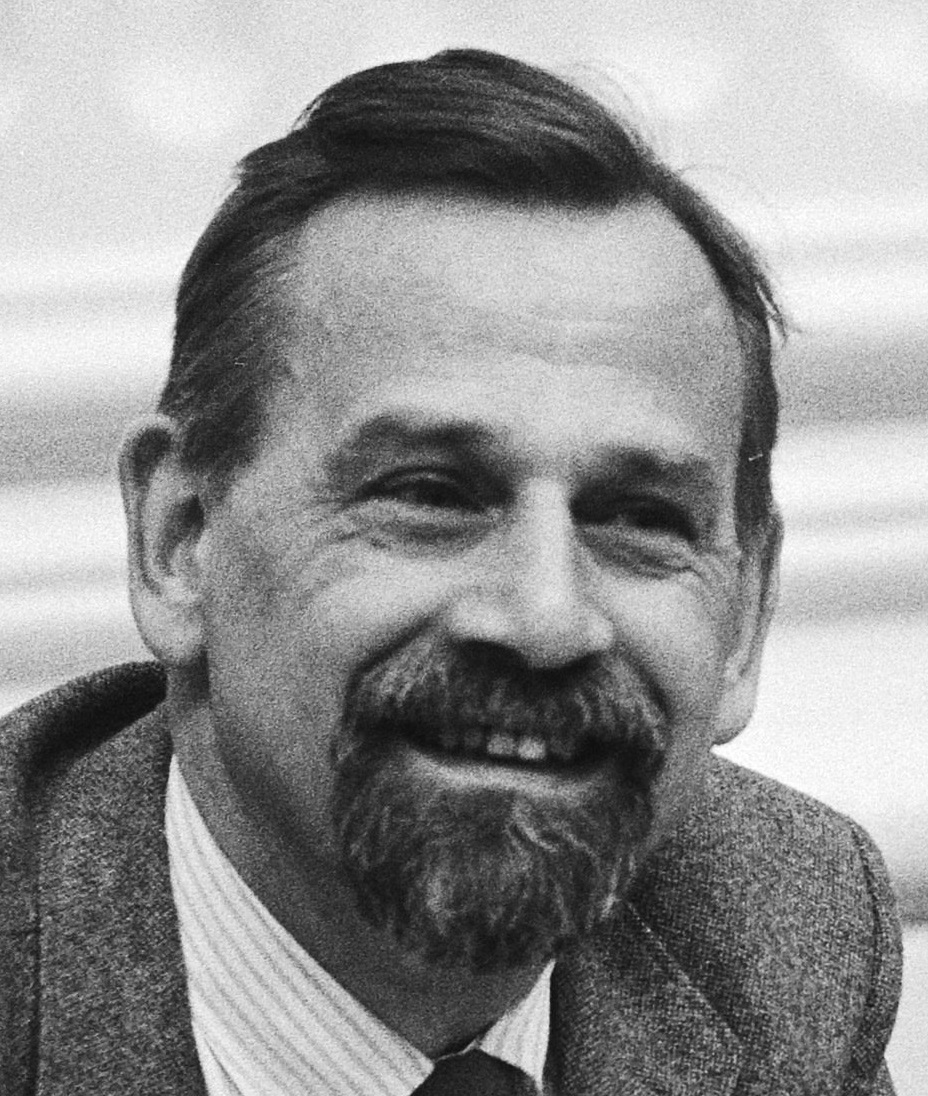
- Scherpenhuizen in 1983

State Secretary for Transport and Water Management
- In office 8 November 1982 – 14 July 1986
- Prime Minister: Ruud Lubbers
- Minister: Neelie Kroes
- Preceded by: –
- Succeeded by: –

Member of the House of Representatives
- In office 23 January 1973 – 7 November 1982
- In office 3 June 1986 – 13 September 1989

Personal details
- Born: Jaap Frederik Scherpenhuizen; 18 April 1934 Groningen, Netherlands
- Died: 2 September 2012 (aged 78) Aduarderzijl, Netherlands
- Party: People's Party for Freedom and Democracy
- Occupation: Politician

Jaap Scherpenhuizen (18 April 1934 – 2 September 2012) was a Dutch politician for the People's Party for Freedom and Democracy (VVD).

== See also ==
- List of members of the House of Representatives of the Netherlands for People's Party for Freedom and Democracy

Political offices
Preceded by –	State Secretary for Transport and Water Management; 1982–1986	Succeeded by –
