= Queeny Rajkowski =

Dutch politician (born 1988)

Member of the House of Representatives
- In office 29 March 2024 – 30 March 2026
- Preceded by: Jacqueline van den Hil
- Succeeded by: Ruud Verkuijlen
- In office 31 March 2021 – 7 December 2023
- Succeeded by: Jacqueline van den Hil

Member of the Utrecht municipal council
- In office 27 March 2014 – 4 February 2021
- Succeeded by: Erik van der Marel

Personal details
- Born: Queeny-Aimée Magdalena Rajkowski; 17 November 1988 (age 37) Nijmegen, Netherlands
- Party: VVD (2008–present)
- Children: 1
- Education: Leiden University
- Website: queenyrajkowski.nl

Queeny-Aimée Magdalena Rajkowski (born 17 November 1988) is a Dutch politician, who has served as a member of the House of Representatives since the 2021 general election with the exception of two interruptions. There, she represents the People's Party for Freedom and Democracy (VVD). She was also on the Utrecht municipal council in the years 2014–21.

== Early life and education ==
Rajkowski was born in 1988 in the Gelderland city Nijmegen to a Polish father, who was a teacher and an entrepreneur, and a mother, who was half Dutch and half Polish and worked as a manager for the province of Gelderland. She has a younger sister and grew up in the city Arnhem, where she attended the high school Stedelijk Gymnasium Arnhem. Rajkowski moved to Utrecht to study economics at university and was a member of the student association Unitas. She switched to public administration at Leiden University after a year, and she became a member of the Youth Organisation Freedom and Democracy (JOVD), the VVD's independent youth division.

== Career and local politics ==
Rajkowski was elected to the Utrecht municipal council in the 2014 municipal elections, appearing fifth on the VVD's party list. She became her party's spokesperson for safety in the council. At the time, she had also been working for the government of the municipality of Utrecht since 2013. Thereafter, she filled positions related to education at Orion Duurzaam Leren and eFcous before moving in 2016 to Valtech, where she would later serve as head of learning and development. As a councilor, Rajkowski criticized the decision by SPO, which is responsible for Utrecht's public primary schools, to stop using Zwarte Piet in its Sinterklaas celebrations, saying parents had not been properly consulted. Besides, she advocated closing Utrecht's street prostitution zone in favor of window prostitution.

She was placed second on the party list in the 2018 municipal election in Utrecht and was re-elected to the council. She became the VVD's vice caucus leader in the council, while safety, jobs, and income were among her specializations. When the commemoration of the 2019 Utrecht tram shooting was canceled in 2020 due to the COVID-19 pandemic, Rajkowski called on Utrecht's citizens to observe one minute of silence and to light a candle.

== House of Representatives ==
She ran for member of parliament in the 2021 general election as the VVD's thirteenth candidate and was elected with 3,246 preference votes. She was installed as House member on 31 March and became the first person on that body of Polish descent. Rajkowski had already left Utrecht's municipal council in February, and she also left Valtech. In the House, she was the VVD's spokesperson for digitization, government IT, telecommunications, the General Intelligence and Security Service (AIVD), and cybersecurity. She called for Russian hackers to be put on the European sanction list during the 2022 Russian invasion of Ukraine. Rajkowski also proposed a ban on deepfake technology out of concern for its usage for revenge porn and political hoaxes. She raised the possibility of an exception for businesses using the technology for legitimate usages. A motion by Rajkowski requesting the cabinet to draft such a bill passed the House of Representatives in November 2022.

Rajkowski was re-elected in November 2023, but she temporarily left the House for her maternity leave on 8 December – days after the swearing in of new members. Her leave ended on 29 March 2024. She became the VVD's spokesperson on digitization, cybersecurity, AIVD, and childcare until her portfolio was changed to asylum, migration, AIVD, and racism when the Schoof cabinet was sworn in. Rajkowski left the House for another maternity leave on 31 March 2026, during which she was replaced by Ruud Verkuijlen.

=== Committee assignments ===
==== 2021–2023 term ====
- Committee for Digital Affairs
- Committee for Economic Affairs and Climate Policy
- Committee for the Interior
- Committee for Justice and Security.

==== 2023–present term ====
- Committee for the Interior
- Committee for Justice and Security
- Committee for Social Affairs and Employment
- Committee for Asylum and Migration

== Personal life ==
Rajkowski lives in the city of Utrecht, and she got married in 2022. In early 2023, she was a contestant of the KRO-NCRV quiz show De slimste mens, surviving four episodes. The first of those was seen by over 2.5 million people.

== Electoral history ==
Electoral history of Queeny Rajkowski
Year	Body	Party	Pos.	Votes	Result		Ref.
Year	Body	Party	Pos.	Votes	Party seats	Individual	Ref.
2021	House of Representatives	People's Party for Freedom and Democracy	13	3,246	34	Won	
2023	House of Representatives	People's Party for Freedom and Democracy	12	3,289	24	Won	
2025	House of Representatives	People's Party for Freedom and Democracy	12	5,565	22	Won	
