= Dieke van Groningen =

Dutch politician (born 1979)

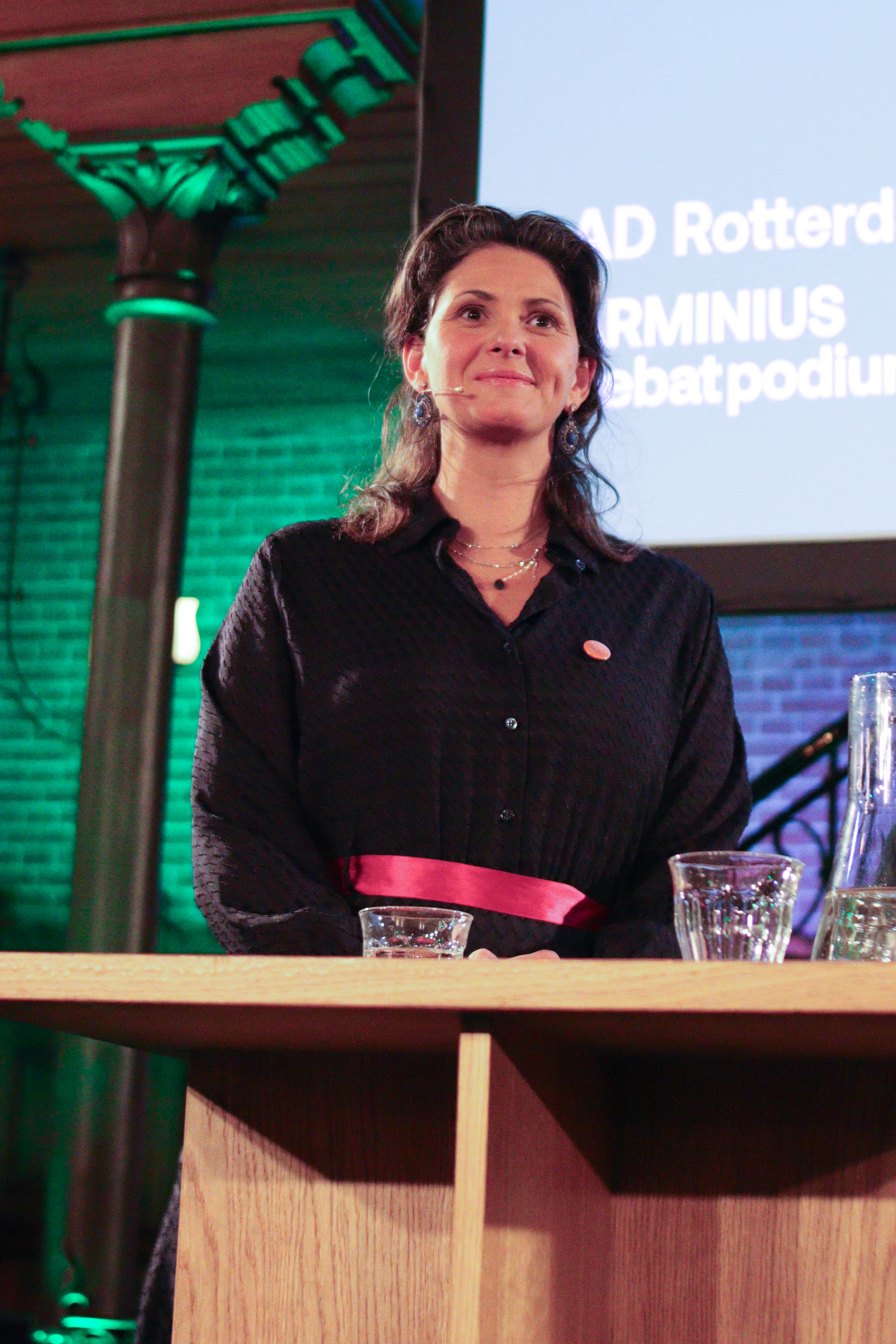
- Van Groningen in 2023

Member of the House of Representatives
- Incumbent
- Assumed office 12 May 2026
- Preceded by: Harry Bevers
- In office 11 September 2025 – 11 November 2025
- Preceded by: Aukje de Vries

Member of the Rotterdam Municipal Council
- Incumbent
- Assumed office 29 March 2018

Personal details
- Born: 19 October 1979 (age 46) Nijmegen, Netherlands
- Party: People's Party for Freedom and Democracy
- Children: 2
- Education: Erasmus University Rotterdam

Dieke Annemiek van Groningen (Dutch: [ˈdikə vɑŋ ˈɣroːnɪŋə(n)]; born 19 October 1979) is a Dutch politician of the conservative-liberal People's Party for Freedom and Democracy (VVD). Born in Nijmegen, she studied business administration at Erasmus University Rotterdam. She became a member of the Rotterdam Municipal Council in March 2018, and she has led the VVD in the council since 2024. Van Groningen advocated for greater latitude for hospitality operators and for adopting a stricter approach toward traffic offenders. On 5 September 2025, she succeeded Aukje de Vries as member of the House of Representatives. Her term ended on 11 November 2025. She replaced Harry Bevers temporarily as a House member starting on 12 May 2026 during his sick leave.

Van Groningen is married, and she has two children.
