= Jacqueline van den Hil =

Member of the Dutch House of Representatives

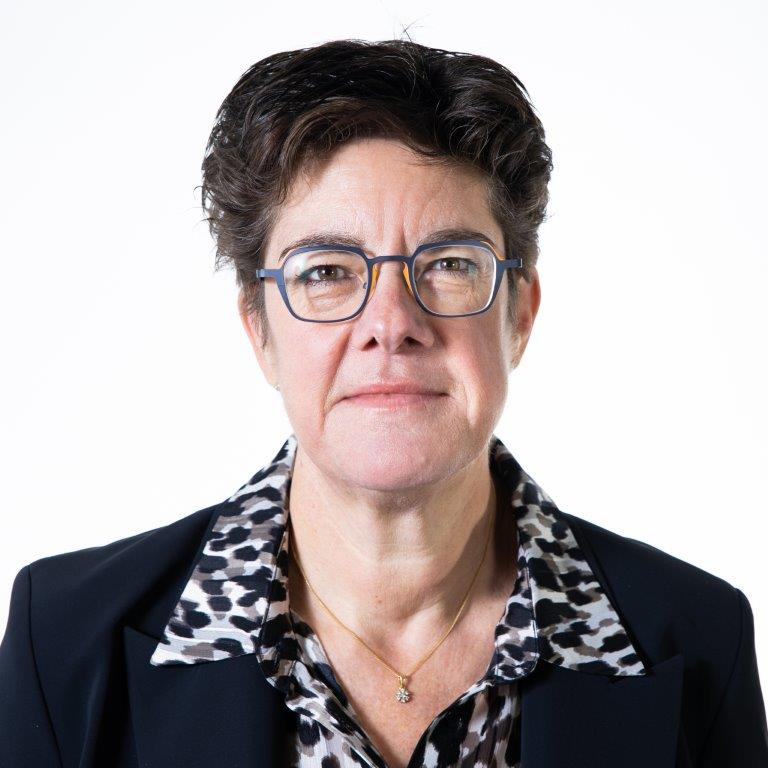

Member of the House of Representatives
- Incumbent
- Assumed office 4 July 2024
- Preceded by: Sophie Hermans
- In office 12 December 2023 – 28 March 2023
- Preceded by: Queeny Rajkowski
- Succeeded by: Queeny Rajkowski
- In office 31 March 2021 – 5 December 2023

Personal details
- Born: 20 March 1968 (age 58) Goes, Netherlands
- Party: People's Party for Freedom and Democracy
- Education: TIAS School for Business and Society
- Occupation: Health care manager

Jacqueline van den Hil (born 20 March 1968) is a Dutch politician of the conservative liberal People's Party for Freedom and Democracy (VVD). She has served intermittently as a member of the House of Representatives since the 2021 general election. Before entering politics, Van den Hil worked as a health care manager in her native province of Zeeland.

== Early life and career ==
Van den Hil was born and raised in the Zeeland city Goes. She attended the secondary school Goese Lyceum at vwo level in the years 1980–86. Van den Hil wanted to study medicine but failed to get in because of the quota. In the meantime, she studied economics at Erasmus University Rotterdam but quit after two years to be trained as a radiodiagnostic laboratory technician at Oosterschelde Hospital. Van den Hil kept working as a lab technician at the hospital after 1991, when her training was completed. She was promoted to medical imaging techniques manager in 2003.

Van den Hil became the manager of the nursing home Ter Schorre in Terneuzen of senior care provider SVRZ in 2008. While working there, she received a Master of Health Administration degree from TIAS School for Business and Society in 2010 after she had also studied management sciences at the Open University of the Netherlands between 2002 and 2008. Van den Hil was hired as manager of SVRZ's Ter Valcke location in Goes in 2013 and kept working there until she became an MP.

She also served on the board of Alzheimer Zeeland (2009–15) and on the supervisory board of Stichting Intervence Jeugdzorg (2018–20).

== Politics ==
Van den Hil joined the VVD in 2006 and was a board member of its Kapelle branch between 2009 and 2015. She was placed fifteenth on the VVD's party list in Kapelle in the 2018 municipal election. Van den Hil ran for member of parliament in the 2021 general election as the VVD's 25th candidate and was elected with 3,543 preference votes. She was sworn into the House of Representatives on 31 March as the only member from Zeeland and served as her party's spokesperson for health care labor market policy, health care professions and education, health care in the Caribbean Netherlands, war victims, resistance fighters, child benefits, child care, mental health care, and sheltered housing. The House of Representatives commemorated the North Sea flood of 1953 in 2023 at the request of Van den Hil, and she pled for a yearly remembrance of the disaster on 1 February.

Van den Hil lost her bid for re-election in November 2023, but she was again sworn into the House on 12 December to temporarily replace Queeny Rajkowski during her maternity leave. Van den Hil was the VVD's spokesperson for mental healthcare, assisted living, long-term healthcare, and childcare. Rajkowski returned to the House on 29 March 2024, bringing an end to Van den Hil's membership. When Sophie Hermans left the House to serve as climate minister in the Schoof cabinet, Van den Hil succeeded her on 4 July 2024, and her new portfolio included mental healthcare, assisted living, youth healthcare, and sports.

=== House committee assignments ===
==== 2021–2023 term ====
- Committee for Foreign Trade and Development Cooperation
- Committee for Health, Welfare and Sport
- Committee for Infrastructure and Water Management
- Committee for Kingdom Relations
- Committee for Social Affairs and Employment
- Contact group Belgium

==== 2023–present term ====
- Committee for Health, Welfare and Sport
- Contact group Belgium

== Personal life ==
Van den Hil is a resident of her birthplace of Goes, and she is openly lesbian. She lived in the nearby village Kapelle between 2000 and 2017. Van den Hil joined a local Rotary club in 2007, and she became chair of the Goes Rotary Club in 2019.

== Electoral history ==
Electoral history of Jacqueline van den Hil
Year	Body	Party	Pos.	Votes	Result		Ref.
Year	Body	Party	Pos.	Votes	Party seats	Individual	Ref.
2021	House of Representatives	People's Party for Freedom and Democracy	25	3,543	34	Won	
2023	House of Representatives	People's Party for Freedom and Democracy	25	3,545	24	Lost (Note: Van den Hil was appointed to the body later during the term due to a vacancy.)	
