= Political assistant (Netherlands) =

Dutch staffer employed by a cabinet member

In Dutch politics, political assistants (PAs; Dutch: politiek assistent) can be appointed to advise cabinet members on political strategy. They are hired by most ministers and state secretaries to inform them about political sentiments of the different parties in parliament. Political assistants became common in the 1990s after having been around for several decades, and the position became subject to specific regulations in 2003.

== Role ==
The Netherlands has a separation between government and politics. Cabinet members – ministers and state secretaries who are politicians – lead their ministry's apparatus of civil servants, who are no political appointees and are expected to provide politically neutral advice. Political assistants are an exception, as they are hired by cabinet members to work as a civil servant for their ministry. They report to the ministry's secretary-general. If a cabinet member resigns, their political assistant has to leave within six months.

Political assistants are responsible for keeping track of the positions of political parties and for gauging support for legislative proposals by cabinet members. They talk to members of parliament, make deals on behalf of cabinet members, and prepare them for debates and speeches. Vrij Nederland magazine noted that the exact tasks of the function have differed over time and across political parties. Political assistants mostly operate in the background of the public political sphere, and they are prohibited from engaging in public relations management. According to Vrij Nederland, this rule is often violated, as political assistants often communicate with journalists.

The names of political assistants are not published by the government, and researchers and journalists have relied on sources such as social media platform LinkedIn to find them.

== History ==
Political assistants did not become prevalent until the 1990s. The hiring of a political advisor by agricultural minister Sicco Mansholt was criticized by members of parliament in 1947, who argued ministers should possess political instincts themselves. In the subsequent period, only some cabinet members had a political assistant, the prime minister usually being amongst them.

Parliamentary questions were asked to the first Kok cabinet in 1994, as the number of PAs had grown to seven. After the opposition had argued this would undermine the functioning of the apparatus of civil servants, Prime Minister Wim Kok responded that they would surely leave simultaneously with cabinet members. Vrij Nederland later concluded that one third of the political assistants of the Kok cabinets stayed in government for some time afterwards, while another third of them worked as lobbyist as of 2024. It has since become customary for almost every cabinet member to have a political assistant, with some having two. Regulations specific to the role were enacted in 2003. However, the Group of States against Corruption (GRECO) has advised that rules should be tightened to prevent conflicts of interest, as political assistants can be influential in political decision making. When the Schoof cabinet was installed in 2024, the NRC newspaper noted that most political assistants were around the age of thirty and were previously employed by a political party or ministry.

== Notable political assistants ==
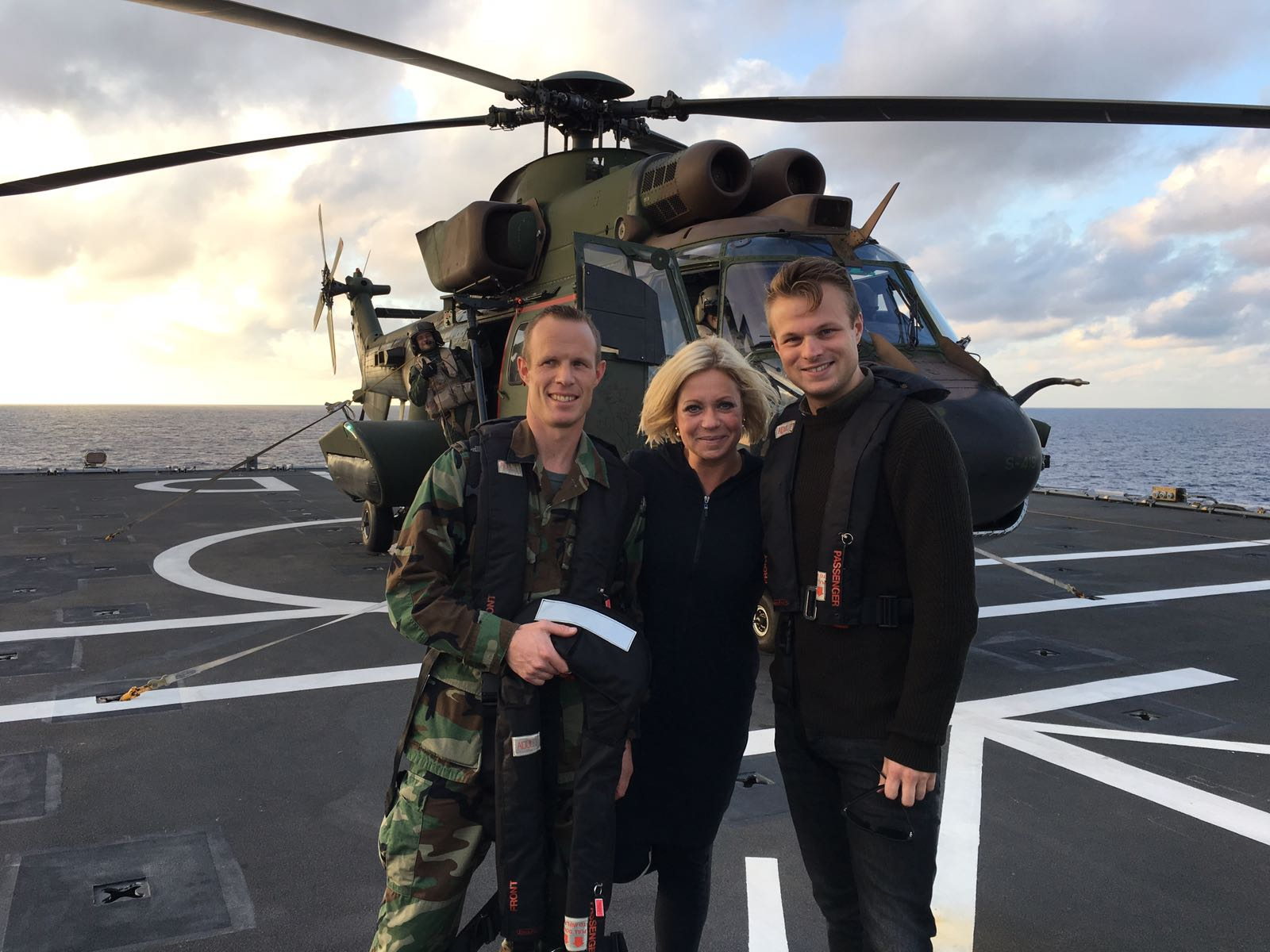
Peter Valstar (right), accompanying Minister of Defence Jeanine Hennis-Plasschaert (center)

Some political assistants have become politicians afterwards. These include Dick Benschop, Ruben Brekelmans, Bart van den Brink, Han ten Broeke, Thom van Campen, Mark Harbers, Sophie Hermans, Hugo de Jonge, Liesje Schreinemacher, Peter Valstar, and Jack de Vries.
