= Ruben Brekelmans =

Dutch politician (born 1986)

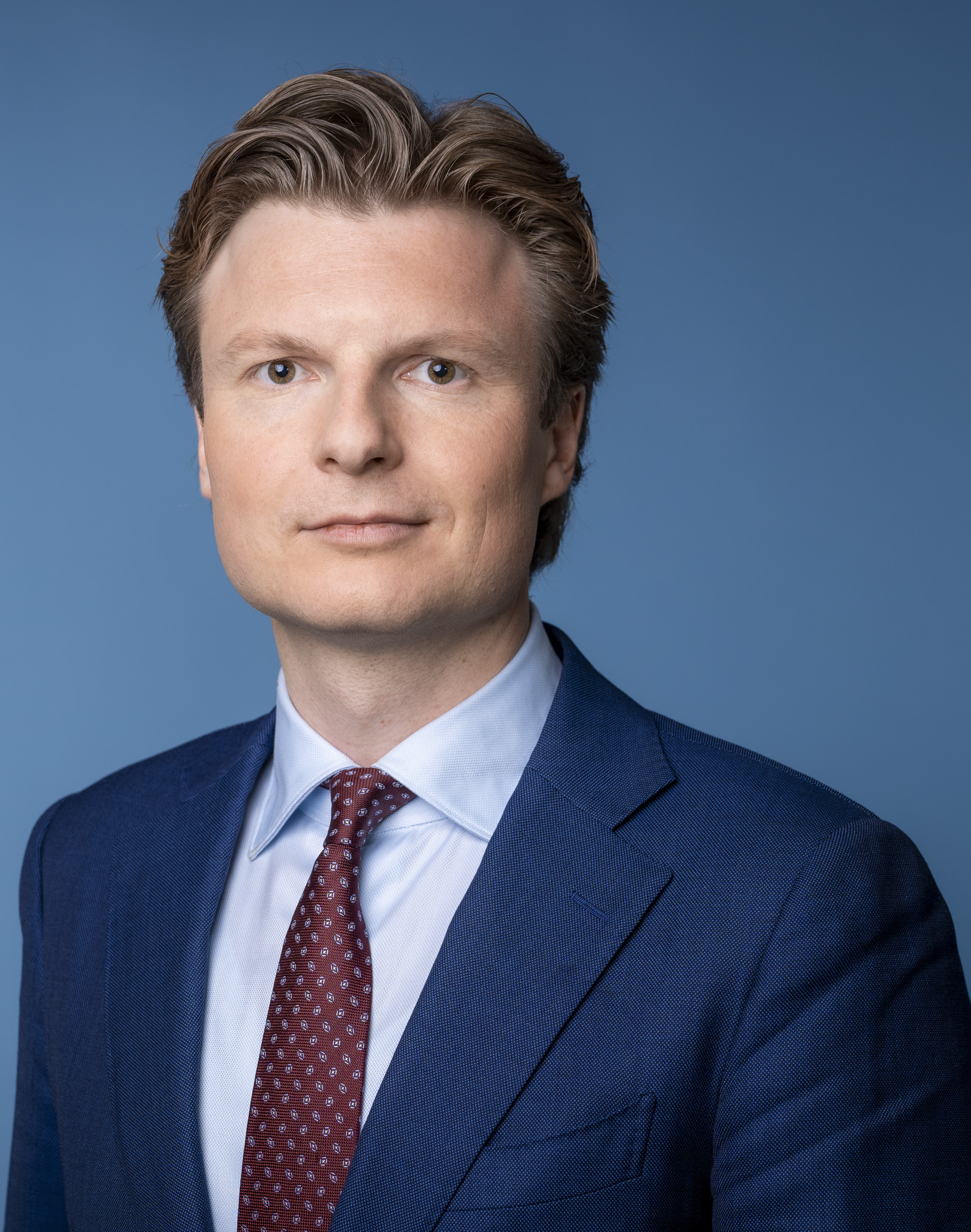
- Official portrait, 2024

Parliamentary leader in the House of Representatives
- Incumbent
- Assumed office 23 February 2026
- Preceded by: Dilan Yeşilgöz
- Parliamentary group: People's Party for Freedom and Democracy

Minister of Defence
- In office 2 July 2024 – 23 February 2026
- Prime Minister: Dick Schoof
- Preceded by: Kajsa Ollongren
- Succeeded by: Dilan Yeşilgöz

Member of the House of Representatives
- Incumbent
- Assumed office 12 November 2025
- In office 31 March 2021 – 2 July 2024
- Succeeded by: Harry Bevers

Personal details
- Born: Ruben Pieter Brekelmans; 18 July 1986 (age 40) Leidschendam, Netherlands
- Party: VVD (2003–present)
- Children: 2
- Education: Tilburg University; London School of Economics; Harvard University
- Website: rubenbrekelmans.nl

Ruben Pieter Brekelmans (born 18 July 1986) is a Dutch politician. He is the parliamentary leader of the People's Party for Freedom and Democracy (VVD) in the House of Representatives. Brekelmans previously served as Minister of Defence in the Schoof cabinet from 2024 to 2026.

== Early life and career ==
He was born in 1986 in Leidschendam, located close to The Hague, and he grew up in the North Brabant village Kaatsheuvel. Brekelmans became a member of Youth Organisation Freedom and Democracy (JOVD), the VVD's independent youth organization, at age seventeen. He studied economics at Tilburg University, global politics at the London School of Economics, and obtained a Master of Public Administration degree in 2015 at the Harvard Kennedy School.

After graduating from Harvard, Brekelmans took a job as strategy consultant at The Boston Consulting Group's Amsterdam office. He subsequently served as political assistant of State Secretary for Justice and Security Mark Harbers and kept working at the Ministry of Justice and Security as director of the program Adaptive Asylum System after Harbers's resignation in May 2019. Brekelmans left the ministry in October 2020 to become program director Insight on Quality at the Ministry of Finance. Next to his job, he was chair of the VVD's thematic network on international affairs between 2017 and 2021, and he was on the committee that wrote his party's election program for the 2019 European Parliament election.

== House of Representatives ==
Brekelmans was the VVD's thirtieth candidate in the 2021 general election and was elected to the House of Representatives with 1,539 preference votes. He was sworn in on 31 March and became his party's spokesperson for foreign policy, international cultural policy, and extensions of foreign missions. Migration was later added to his specialties. During the Russian military build-up ahead of its 2022 invasion of Ukraine, Brekelmans advocated sending weapons to Ukraine, and he kept pleading for strong sanctions after the start of the invasion including closing the European Union's airspace for Russian airliners. Furthermore, Brekelmans was in support of quickly increasing spending on the Dutch military such that its budget would adhere to the NATO norm of 2% of GDP, and he wanted more security, defense, and migration cooperation in the European Union, although he opposed a European army.

In an opinion piece, he wrote that he wanted to deport asylum seekers whose application had been rejected to make room for "real refugees" from Ukraine. He also raised the possibility of temporarily halting new asylum applications in light of capacity problems at asylum seekers' centers. Shortly after the collapse of the fourth Rutte cabinet resulting from disagreements about immigration reform, Brekelmans argued in favor of cooperation with the Party for Freedom (PVV), including as a confidence partner for a minority government. The VVD and its leader Mark Rutte had dismissed the PVV for years due to a failed coalition in the early 2010s and its anti-immigration and anti-Islam stances. Brekelmans said that he kept his party's objections against the PVV but that their support might be necessary to solve immigration issues. He suggested the yearly influx of immigrants would have to be reduced by at least 50,000. The JOVD and former VVD politician Ed Nijpels criticized Brekelmans's comments, while VVD lead candidate Dilan Yeşilgöz weeks later also did not dismiss future cooperation with the PVV. Following the 2023 general election, Brekelmans served as his party's spokesperson for foreign affairs (excluding Europe) and migration.

=== Committee memberships ===
In the House, Brekelmans was on the following committees:

- Committee for Defence
- Committee for European Affairs
- Committee for Foreign Affairs
- Committee for Foreign Trade and Development Cooperation
- Committee for Justice and Security
- Committee for Kingdom Relations
- Dutch parliamentary delegation to the NATO Assembly
- Dutch parliamentary delegation to the OSCE
- Parliamentary Assembly of the Council of Europe (substitute)
- Contact Group France
- Contact Group United Kingdom
- Contact Group United States (chair)

== Minister of Defence ==
After the PVV, VVD, NSC, and BBB formed the Schoof cabinet, Brekelmans was sworn in as Minister of Defence on 2 July 2024, succeeding Kajsa Ollongren. In September 2024, Brekelmans and State Secretary Gijs Tuinman announced €2.4 billion in increased yearly funding for the Netherlands Armed Forces. Coalition parties agreed to increase defense spending to adhere to the NATO norm of 2% of GDP in response the Russian invasion of Ukraine. The additional funding would go towards attracting more personnel and the purchase of munitions, 50 Leopard 2A8 battle tanks, six F-35 fighter jets, two Anti-Submarine Warfare Frigates, and several NH90 military helicopters. The Netherlands had been left without tanks since 2011 because of budget cuts. An additional €716 million in funding was added in November 2024 to meet the spending norm.

Brekelmans argued that increased defense spending was necessary due to Russia's invasion of Ukraine. Brekelmans told in a December 2024 interview that he no longer excluded the possibility of peace negotiations. He proposed for Europe to take a leading role in such efforts, ahead of the second inauguration of US president Donald Trump. He also said that peace, in contrast to an armistice, could only be achieved if Ukraine would receive security guarantees and if NATO would be strengthened. However, according to Brekelmans, the underlying threat and aggression of the Russian regime would remain, requiring sustained higher levels of European defense spending.

== Honours and decorations ==
=== Foreign honours ===
- Ukraine: Order of Merit, third class (2023).

== Personal life ==
Brekelmans lives in the North Brabant town Oisterwijk. He has a partner and two daughters, born in 2021 and 2024. His first child was born on the day before his election to the House.

== Electoral history ==
Electoral history of Ruben Brekelmans
Year	Body	Party	Pos.	Votes	Result		Ref.
Year	Body	Party	Pos.	Votes	Party seats	Individual	Ref.
2021	House of Representatives	People's Party for Freedom and Democracy	30	1,539	34	Won	
2023	House of Representatives	People's Party for Freedom and Democracy	6	13,902	24	Won	
2025	House of Representatives	People's Party for Freedom and Democracy	3	166,730	22	Won	

Political offices
Preceded by Kajsa Ollongren	Minister of Defence; 2024–2026	Succeeded by Dilan Yeşilgöz
