= Bart de Liefde =

Dutch politician and field hockey umpire

Member of the House of Representatives
- In office 26 October 2010 – 19 February 2016

Personal details
- Born: 18 September 1976 (age 49) London
- Party: People's Party for Freedom and Democracy
- Occupation: Politician

Barthold Charles (Bart) de Liefde (born 18 September 1976 in London) is a Dutch former politician and field hockey umpire. As a member of the People's Party for Freedom and Democracy (Dutch: Volkspartij voor Vrijheid en Democratie) he was an MP between 26 October 2010 and 19 February 2016. He focused on matters of culture, sports and games of chance.

In January 2016 De Liefde announced he would resign in February 2016 to become a manager at Uber. On 1 March 2016 he was replaced by Remco Bosma.

He was a member of the municipal council of The Hague from April 2006 to March 2010 and from June to October 2010.

On February 19, 2016, De Liefde left the Second Chamber to become a lobbyist for the taxi company Uber.

De Liefde studied public administration at Thorbecke Academy in Leeuwarden (BA) and at Leiden University (MA).
