= Chris Simons =

Dutch politician (born 1965)

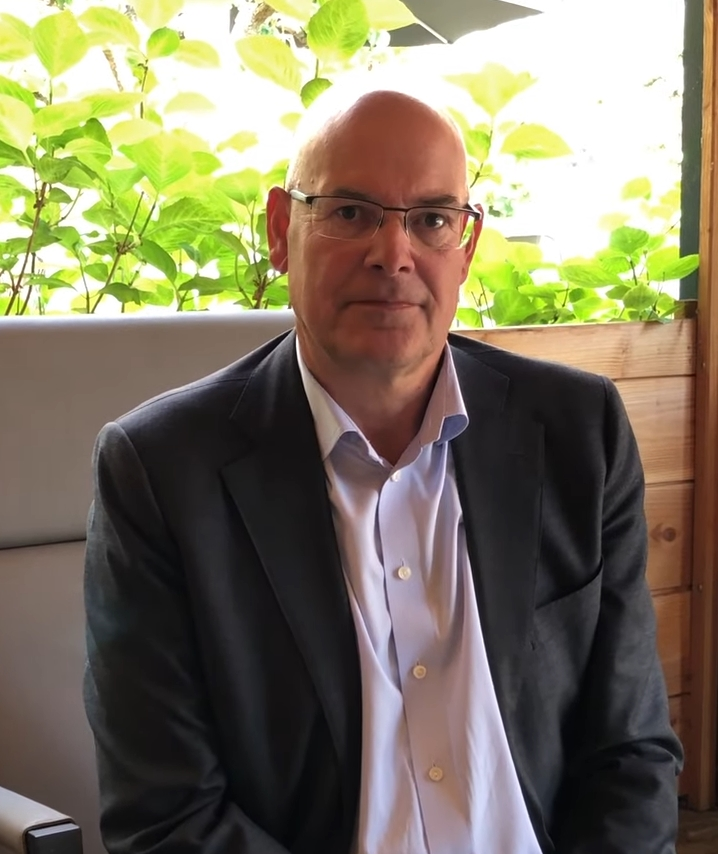
- Simons in 2020

Member of the House of Representatives
- In office 22 March 2022 – 5 December 2023

Personal details
- Born: 1 March 1965 (age 60) Middelburg, Netherlands

Chris Simons (born 1 March 1965) is a Dutch politician. He served as a member of the House of Representatives. Simons is a member of the People's Party for Freedom and Democracy (VVD).

Simons replaced Ockje Tellegen during her sick leave from March 2022 until July 2022. He replaced Bente Becker from 23 August 2022 till 1 November 2022 during her pregnancy leave. Simons became a member of the House of Representatives on 1 November 2022.

== Electoral history ==
Electoral history of Chris Simons
Year	Body	Party	Pos.	Votes	Result		Ref.
Year	Body	Party	Pos.	Votes	Party seats	Individual	Ref.
2021	House of Representatives	People's Party for Freedom and Democracy	46	653	34	Lost (Note: Simons was appointed to the body later during the term due to a vacancy.)	
2023	House of Representatives	People's Party for Freedom and Democracy	38	696	24	Lost	
