= Peter Valstar =

Dutch politician

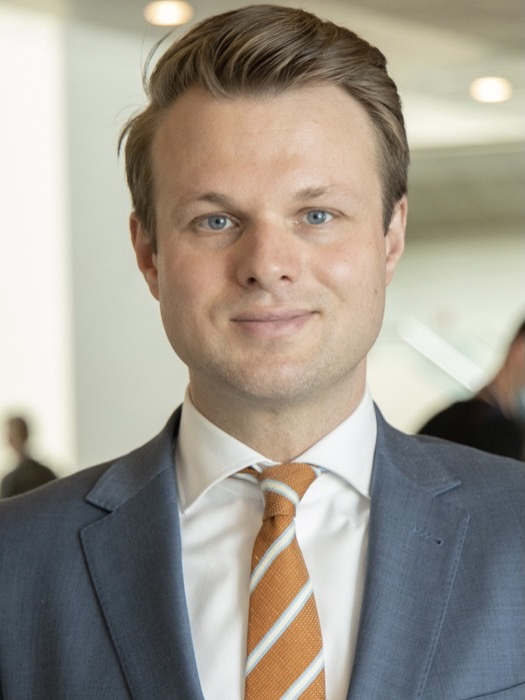

Member of the House of Representatives
- In office 31 March 2021 – 5 December 2023

Personal details
- Born: Peter Johannes Valstar; 27 March 1985 (age 41) 's-Gravenzande, Netherlands
- Party: People's Party for Freedom and Democracy
- Education: Inholland University of Applied Sciences
- Occupation: Politician; political staffer
- Website: petervalstar.nl

Peter Johannes "Peter" Valstar (born 27 March 1985) is a Dutch politician of the conservative liberal People's Party for Freedom and Democracy (VVD). He worked as a press officer for the VVD, as the political assistant of Minister Jeanine Hennis-Plasschaert and Prime Minister Mark Rutte, and as a spokesperson at the Ministry of Defence before being elected to the House of Representatives in March 2021. He lost his bid for re-election in November 2023.

== Early life and education ==
Valstar was born in the South Holland town of 's-Gravenzande and grew up in nearby Ter Heijde with his sister. He followed secondary education at havo level at the Zandevelt and Gasthuislaan locations of the Interconfessionele Scholengemeenschap Westland in 's-Gravenzande. He subsequently started studying Management, Economics, and Law but quit after two months. Valstar later studied communication studies at the Inholland University of Applied Sciences in The Hague between 2005 and 2009 and interned at early-evening talk show De wereld draait door.

== Career ==
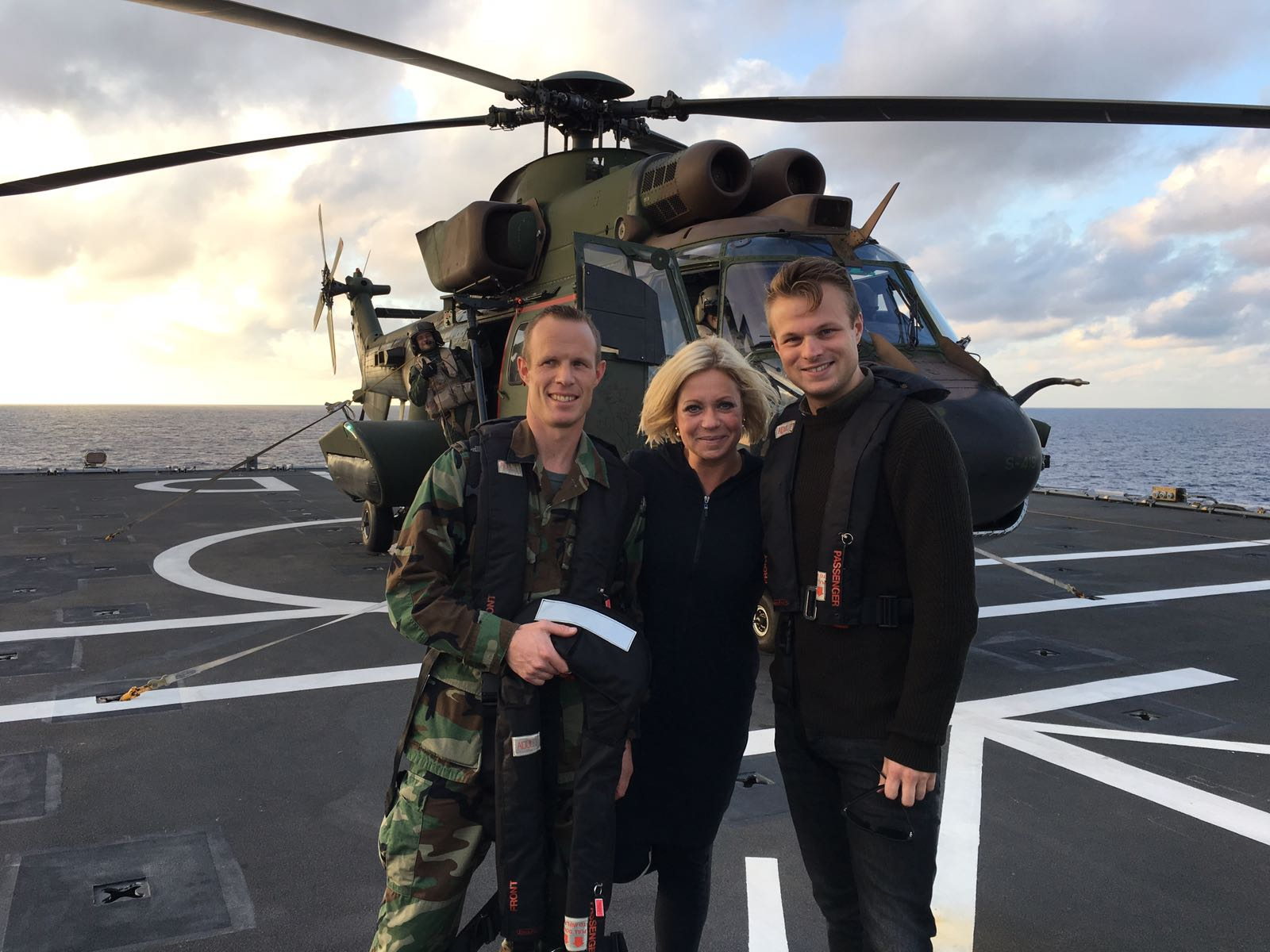
Valstar (right) with Defence Minister Jeanine Hennis-Plasschaert (middle)

Valstar started his career in 2009 as a communications advisor for the VVD, where he worked on its social media strategy, and he became a press officer of its parliamentary group in the House of Representatives in 2011. He stayed in that position until he took a job as political advisor of Defence Minister Jeanine Hennis-Plasschaert in 2016. Another year later, Valstar became a senior spokesperson at the Ministry of Defence, serving under her successor Ank Bijleveld and Defence State Secretary Barbara Visser. While still in that position, he twice served as temporary political advisor of Prime Minister Mark Rutte at the Ministry of General Affairs because of maternity leaves, the first time from August 2018 to January 2019 and the second time from March to August 2020.

He participated in the 2018 municipal elections as the VVD's fourth candidate in Westland, but his party came one seat short for Valstar to be elected to the municipal council. He was offered a seat in the council a month later after someone had stepped down to become an alderman, but Valstar declined it. He did assist the VVD's group in the council next to his job in the period 2019–21. From that position, he proposed to name more streets in the municipality after local soldiers and resistance fighters in World War II.

Valstar ran for the House of Representatives in the 2021 general election, being placed 21st on the VVD's party list. He was elected and received 4,102 preference votes. He was sworn into office on 31 March 2021 and left his job at the defence ministry. Valstar is on the contact group Belgium and on the Committees for Agriculture, Nature and Food Quality; for Defence (vice chair); for Digital Affairs (chair); for Foreign Affairs; and for Justice and Security. He became his party's spokesperson for fishery, nature, horticulture (a major industry in Westland), the countryside, animal welfare, war victims, and resistance fighters. However, later in 2021, his portfolio changed to nature, horticulture, and immigration (excluding migrant workers) before changing to defense, nature, and horticulture in early 2022. Valstar co-filed motions to arm MQ-9 Reaper unmanned aerial vehicles, to allow tastings of cultured meat, and to call on the government to aid the greenhouse horticulture sector in cooperation with banks in a time of high natural gas prices. All three were carried by the House. In September 2022 – during the Russian invasion of Ukraine – he joined Chris Stoffer (SGP) in the drafting of a bill to make sure defense spending would be at least 2% of Dutch GDP in accordance to a NATO norm.

== Personal life ==
Valstar has a wife named Larissa and two children, and he is a resident of his birthplace of 's-Gravenzande. He has also lived in Monster, Ter Heijde, Wateringen, and Naaldwijk, all located in the region of Westland. Valstar's hobbies include genealogy, and he has digitized his family tree together with a family member.

== Electoral history ==
Electoral history of Peter Valstar
Year	Body	Party	Pos.	Votes	Result		Ref.
Year	Body	Party	Pos.	Votes	Party seats	Individual	Ref.
2021	House of Representatives	People's Party for Freedom and Democracy	21	4,102	34	Won	
2023	House of Representatives	People's Party for Freedom and Democracy	26	3,611	24	Lost	
