= Harry Bevers =

Dutch politician (born 1965)

Member of the House of Representatives
- In office 4 July 2024 – 11 May 2026
- Preceded by: Ruben Brekelmans
- Succeeded by: Dieke van Groningen
- In office 18 January 2022 – 5 December 2023

Personal details
- Born: 5 March 1965 (age 61) Maassluis, Netherlands
- Party: People's Party for Freedom and Democracy
- Occupation: Politician

Harry Bevers (born 5 March 1965) is a Dutch politician of the People's Party for Freedom and Democracy (VVD). He has been a member of the House of Representatives since 4 July 2024, but he has been on sick leave since 12 May 2026. He previously held a seat from 18 January 2022 to 5 December 2023. From 2010 to 2022 he was a member of the municipal council of Leeuwarden.

== Social career ==
Bevers attended the pre-vocational secondary education level 4 at the Marnix-Mavo in Maassluis from 1977 to 1981. He then followed a vocational education (MBO) course in social services at De Lok in Leiden from 1981 to 1984 and a higher professional education (HBO) course in social work at the Rijnmond University of Applied Sciences in Rotterdam from 1984 to 1987. He worked in social work between 1986 and 1995 and in automation between 1995 and 2022. From 2001 to 2002 he followed a post-HBO course in business administration at the Hanze University of Applied Sciences.

== Political career ==
=== Leeuwarden Municipal Council ===
Bevers was a member of the Leeuwarden municipal council on behalf of the VVD from 2010 to 2022. In this capacity, he was, among other things, chairman of the Audit Committee and vice-chairman of the VVD faction. His portfolio included finance, spatial planning, sports, business operations, public services, culture and LF 2018, monument care, recreation and tourism, and city and regional marketing.

=== House of Representatives ===
Bevers was ranked 43rd on the VVD candidate list for the 2021 general election. He was sworn in as a member of the House of Representatives of the States General on 18 January 2022 on behalf of the VVD. As a member of the House of Representatives, his portfolio included water, poverty and debt assistance and adult education (including lifelong learning). He was ranked 27th on the VVD candidate list for the 2023 general election. He retired from the House of Representatives on 5 December 2023 after losing re-election. When Ruben Brekelmans stepped down from the House of Representatives to serve as defense minister in the Schoof cabinet, Bevers succeeded him on 4 July 2024. He was the VVD's spokesperson on long-term care and medical ethics. He went on sick leave starting 12 May 2026, being replaced by Dieke van Groningen, shortly after he had been diagnosed with acute myeloid leukemia.

=== House committees ===
==== 2022–2023 term ====
- Committee for Education, Culture and Science
- Committee for Social Affairs and Employment

==== 2024–2025 term ====
- Committee for Education, Culture and Science (vice chair)
- Committee for Health, Welfare and Sport

== Decorations ==
Honours
Ribbon bar	Honour	Country	Date	Ref.
	Knight of the Order of Orange-Nassau	Netherlands	5 December 2023	

== Electoral history ==
Electoral history of Harry Bevers
Year	Body	Party	Pos.	Votes	Result		Ref.
Year	Body	Party	Pos.	Votes	Party seats	Individual	Ref.
2021	House of Representatives	People's Party for Freedom and Democracy	43	547	34	Lost (Note: Bevers was appointed to the body later during the term due to a vacancy.)	
2023	House of Representatives	People's Party for Freedom and Democracy	27	878	34	Lost (Note: Bevers was appointed to the body later during the term due to a vacancy.)	
2025	House of Representatives	People's Party for Freedom and Democracy	17	2,353	22	Won	
