= Han ten Broeke =

Dutch politician (born 1969)

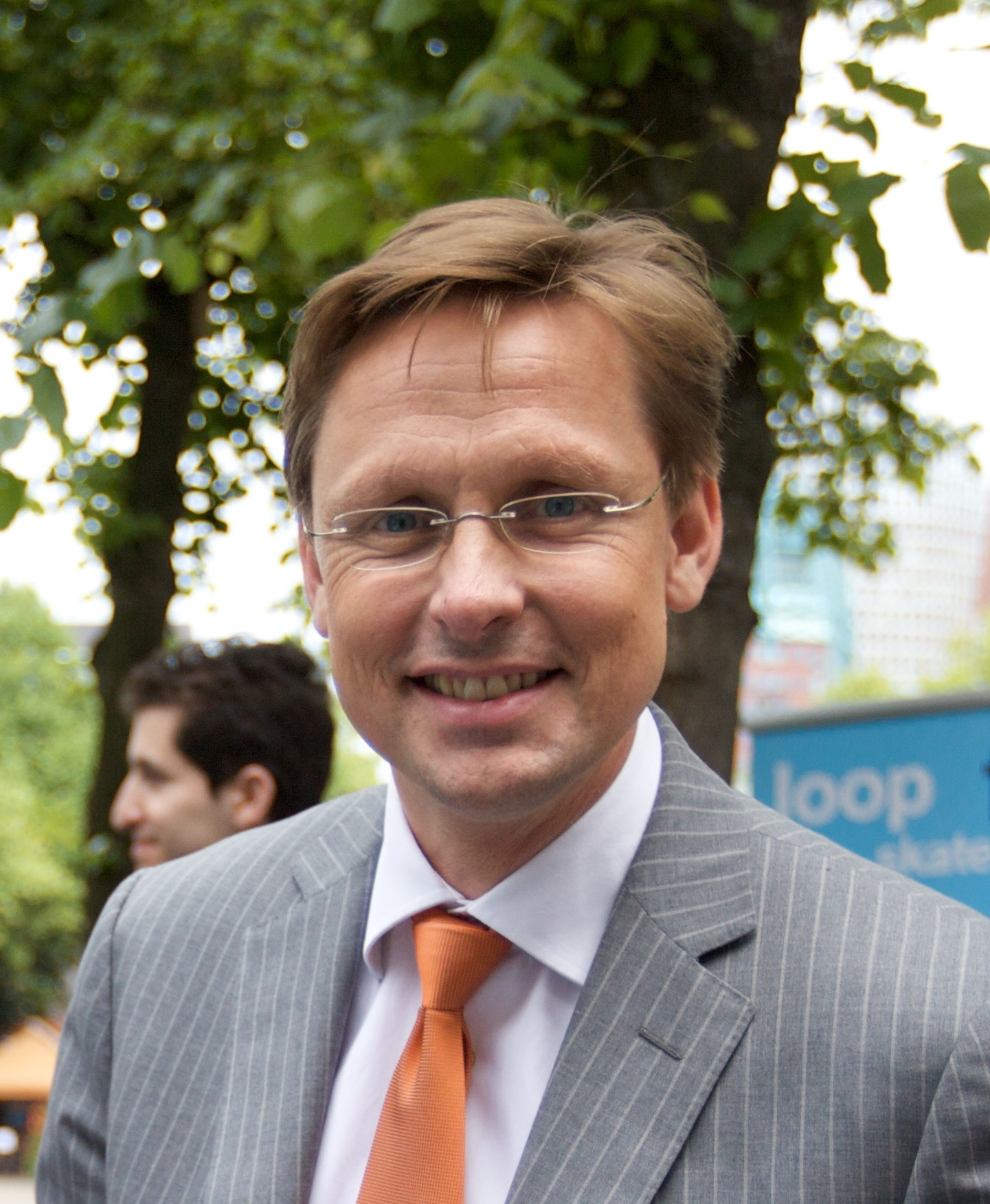
- Han ten Broeke, 2010

Member of the House of Representatives
- In office 30 November 2006 – 4 September 2018

Personal details
- Born: 2 March 1969 (age 57) Haaksbergen
- Party: People's Party for Freedom and Democracy
- Occupation: Politician

Johannes Hermanus "Han" ten Broeke (born 2 March 1969) is a Dutch former politician who served as a member of the House of Representatives from 30 November 2006 until 4 September 2018. A member of the People's Party for Freedom and Democracy (Volkspartij voor Vrijheid en Democratie, VVD), he focused his parliamentary work on matters of foreign policy and the Armed forces of the Netherlands.

== Life and career ==
Ten Broeke was born and raised in Haaksbergen. He became a member of the VVD in 1982, aged 13, and he studied political science with a specialization in international relations at Leiden University from 1988 to 1998. He was a staffer and later political assistant for Annemarie Jorritsma from 1992 to 1996, and he worked at telecommunications company KPN afterwards, including as head of public affairs. He founded his own consultancy firm in 2004.

After winning a parliamentary seat in the general election of 2006 he was re-elected in 2010, 2012 and 2017. He stepped down in 2018 as a member of the House of Representatives after an article in HP/De Tijd revealed that in 2013 Ten Broeke, then 44, had engaged in an inappropriate relationship with a 25-year old staff member of his parliamentary group.

Ten Broeke started a new role in January 2019 as political affairs director at HCSS, the Hague Centre for Strategic Studies. In March 2020 he was elected chairman of BOVAG, the Dutch trade association for transportation retailers next to his position at HCSS. He was elected to a second four-year term in December 2023, effective 26 March 2024.

In January 2025, Ten Broeke succeeded Esther de Lange as head of cabinet for European Commissioner for Climate, Net Zero and Clean Growth Wopke Hoekstra.

== Other activities ==
- European Council on Foreign Relations (ECFR), Member of the Council
