= Michiel van Veen =

Dutch politician

Michiel Sjouke van Veen (born 20 March 1971 in Groningen) is a Dutch politician. As a member of the People's Party for Freedom and Democracy (Volkspartij voor Vrijheid en Democratie) he was an MP from 20 September 2012 to 30 November 2016. In the House he was replaced by Jock Geselschap. Van Veen subsequently became mayor of Gemert-Bakel. Previously he was an alderman of Cuijk from 2010 to 2012.
