= Remco Bosma =

Dutch politician (born 1971)

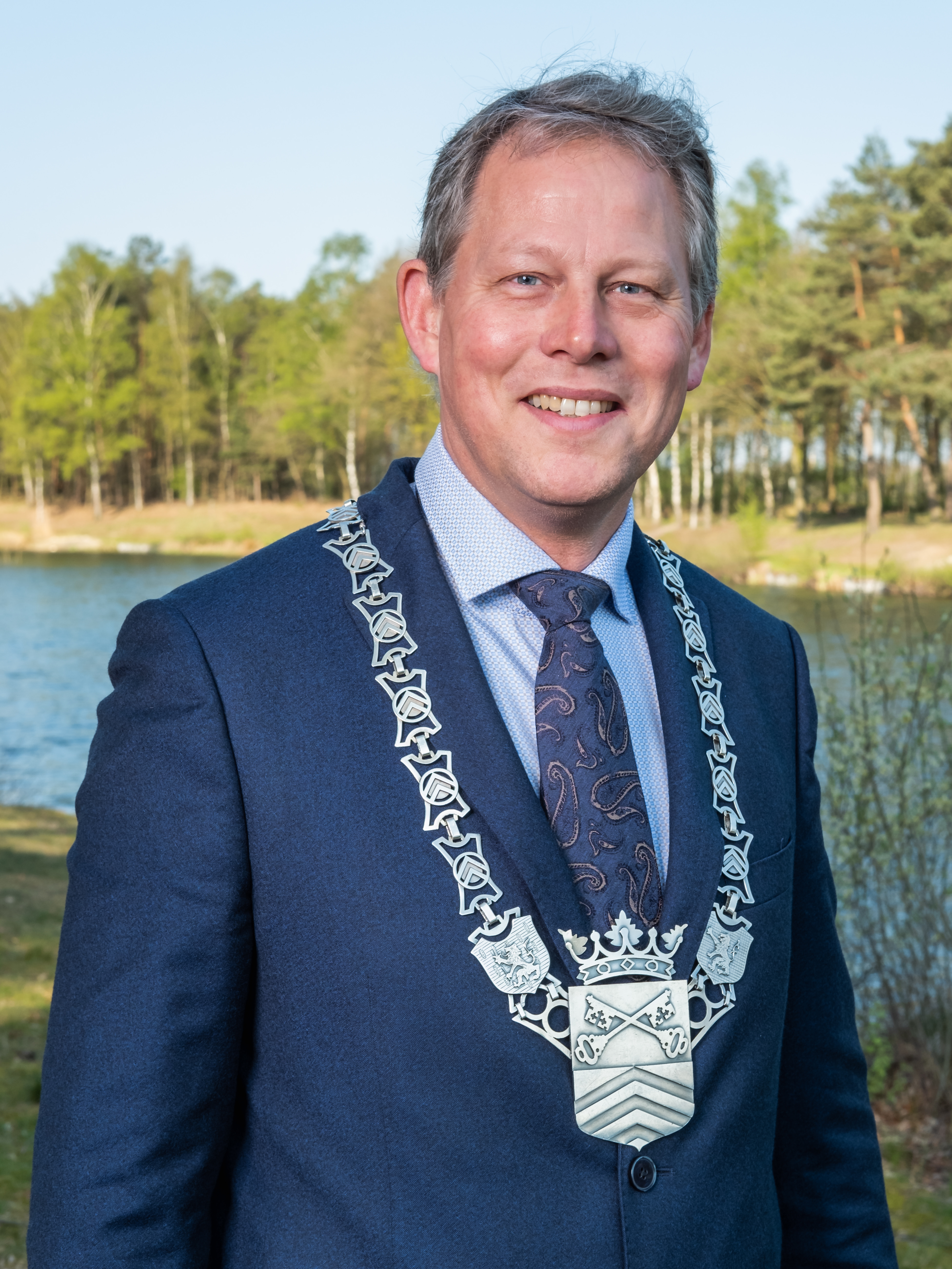

Mayor of Bladel
- Incumbent
- Assumed office 16 January 2019
- Preceded by: Peter Maas

Member of the House of Representatives
- In office 1 March 2016 – 23 March 2017

Member of the States of Flevoland
- In office 15 March 2007 – 1 March 2016

Personal details
- Born: Remco Paul George Bosma; 6 June 1971 (age 54) Breda, Netherlands
- Party: People's Party for Freedom and Democracy

Remco Paul George Bosma (born 6 June 1971) is a Dutch politician. He has been Mayor of Bladel since 16 January 2019. Previously Bosma was a member of the House of Representatives for the People's Party for Freedom and Democracy between 1 March 2016 and 23 March 2017. He served in the States of Flevoland between 15 March 2007 and 1 March 2016.

== Career ==
Bosma was born on 6 June 1971 in Breda. He studied to be an engineer at Wageningen University and Research Centre and has mainly worked in water management. Since February 2003 he worked as a senior inspector for the Inspectie Leefomgeving en Transport of the Dutch Ministry of Infrastructure and the Environment.

Bosma was number 54 on the People's Party for Freedom and Democracy list for the 2012 Dutch general election. On 18 February 2016 Bart de Liefde left the House of Representatives. After Frans Weekers declined to take up the vacant seat Bosma succeeded De Liefde on 1 March 2016. His term in office ended on 23 March 2017. Bosma served in the States of Flevoland between March 2007 and 1 March 2016.

Bosma was sworn in as mayor of Bladel on 16 January 2019.
