= Aukje de Vries =

Dutch politician (born 1964)

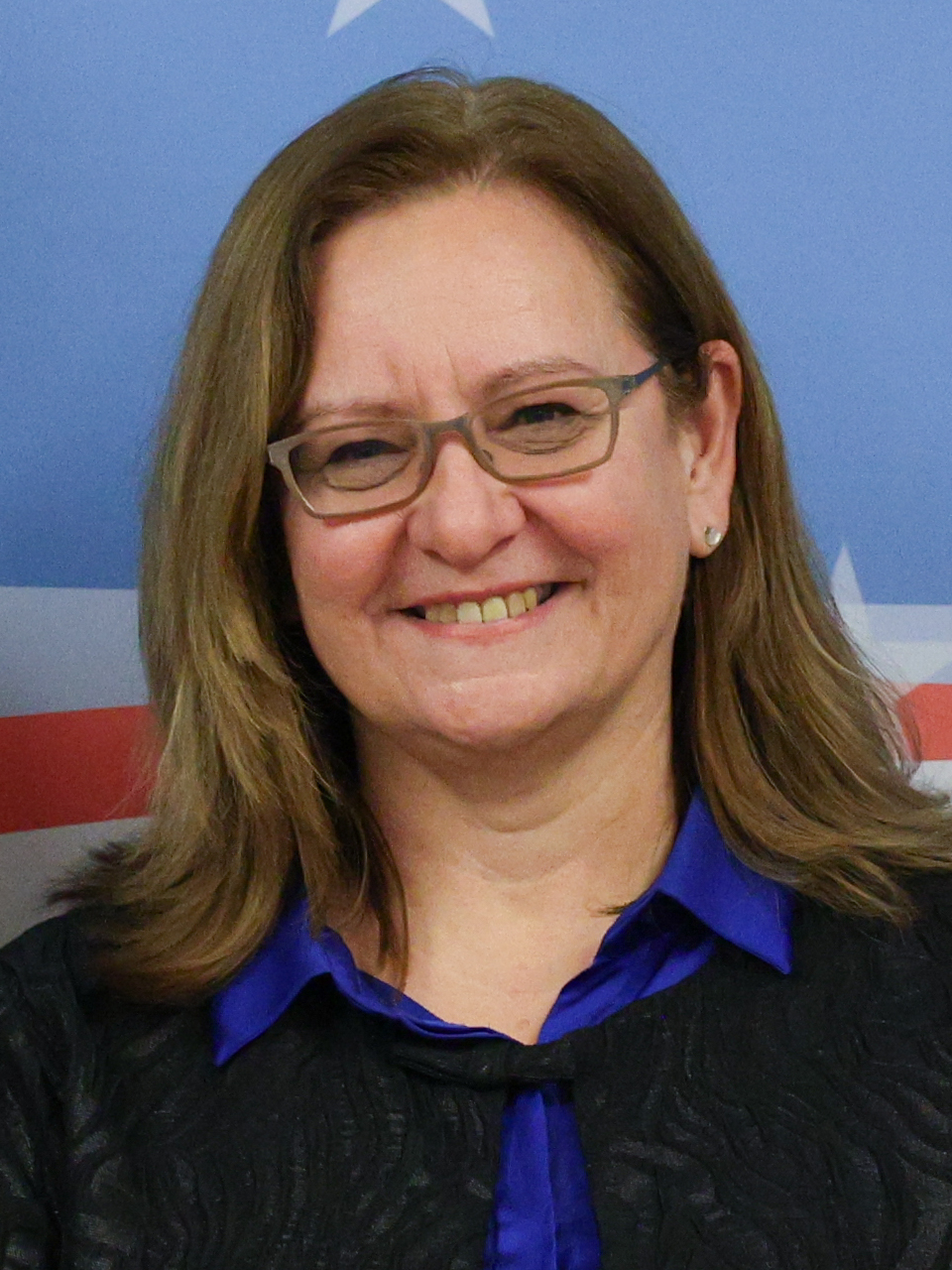
- De Vries in 2025

State Secretary for Foreign Trade and Development
- In office 5 September 2025 – 23 February 2026
- Minister: David van Weel
- Cabinet: Schoof
- Preceded by: Hanneke Boerma

State of Secretary for Finance
- In office 10 January 2022 – 2 July 2024 Serving with Marnix van Rij
- Prime Minister: Mark Rutte
- Preceded by: Hans Vijlbrief; Alexandra van Huffelen
- Succeeded by: Folkert Idsinga; Nora Achahbar

Member of the House of Representatives
- In office 6 December 2023 – 5 September 2025
- Succeeded by: Dieke van Groningen
- In office 8 November 2012 – 10 January 2022

Personal details
- Born: 21 October 1964 (age 61) Leeuwarden
- Party: People's Party for Freedom and Democracy
- Occupation: Politician

Aukje de Vries (born 21 October 1964) is a Dutch politician of the People's Party for Freedom and Democracy (VVD).

She was a member of the municipal council of Leeuwarden from 2002 to 2011 and a member of the provincial parliament of Friesland from 11 March 2011 until November 2012. De Vries became an MP on 8 November 2012, and she started serving as State of Secretary for Finance in the fourth Rutte cabinet on 10 January 2022. Her term ended on 2 July 2024, when the Schoof cabinet was sworn in. In the House, De Vries was the VVD's spokesperson for government budget, monetary policy, financial markets, kingdom relations, and Wadden Sea. De Vries joined the demissionary Schoof cabinet on 5 September 2025 as State Secretary for Foreign Trade and Development, succeeding Hanneke Boerma whose party left the cabinet.

== Electoral history ==
Electoral history of Aukje de Vries
Year	Body	Party	Pos.	Votes	Result		Ref.
Year	Body	Party	Pos.	Votes	Party seats	Individual	Ref.
2010	House of Representatives	People's Party for Freedom and Democracy	42	1,292	31	Lost	
2012	House of Representatives	People's Party for Freedom and Democracy	45	1,352	41	Lost (Note: De Vries was appointed to the body later during the term due to a vacancy.)	
2017	House of Representatives	People's Party for Freedom and Democracy	18	5,795	33	Won	
2021	House of Representatives	People's Party for Freedom and Democracy	8	9,146	34	Won	
2023	House of Representatives	People's Party for Freedom and Democracy	8	7,124	24	Won	

== Notes ==
Political offices
Preceded by Hanneke Boerma	State Secretary for Foreign Trade and Development; 2025–2026	Vacant
