= Jan Klink =

Dutch politician (born 1985)

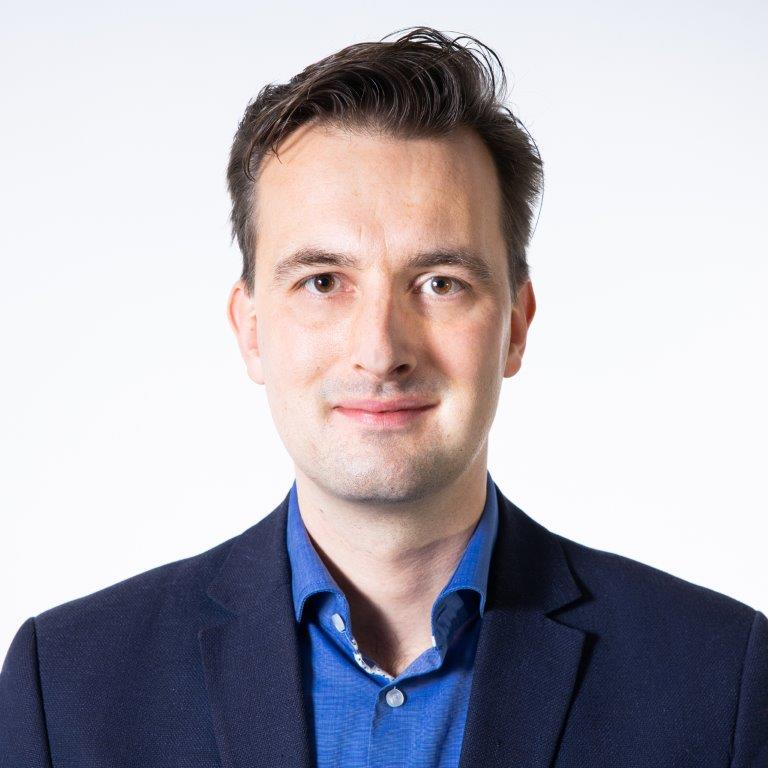

Member of the House of Representatives
- In office 2 June 2021 – 5 December 2023
- Preceded by: Bas van 't Wout

Alderman in Wijdemeren
- In office 9 May 2018 – 26 March 2021
- Succeeded by: Jos Kea

Member of the Wijdemeren municipal council
- In office 29 March 2018 – 9 May 2018
- Succeeded by: Michiel van Balen

Personal details
- Born: Johannes Jacobus Klink; 18 February 1985 (age 41) Wittewierum, Netherlands
- Party: People's Party for Freedom and Democracy (VVD)
- Spouse: Irma Klink
- Children: 4
- Education: Wageningen University & Research
- Occupation: Civil servant, farmer

Johannes Jacobus "Jan" Klink (born 18 February 1985) is a Dutch civil servant and politician for the conservative liberal People's Party for Freedom and Democracy (VVD). Born in the province of Groningen, he co-owned a dairy farm and worked at the Ministry of Economic Affairs, Agriculture and Innovation. He was elected to the Wijdemeren municipal council in 2018 and became an alderman shortly after. Klink was appointed to the House of Representatives in June 2021.

== Early life and career ==
Klink was born in the hamlet of Wittewierum in Groningen. His family moved to Boven Pekela, located in the same province, in 1998. His parents owned a dairy farm in that village, and his father died due to a work accident in 2000. Klink, his mother, and his two younger brothers continued the farm and hired a manager for day-to-day operations. Between 2003 and 2010, Klink did a bachelor's in Business and Consumer Sciences followed by a master's in Management and Economics at Wageningen University & Research. While studying, he assisted House of Representatives member Janneke Snijder-Hazelhoff (VVD), whose specialty was agriculture.

After his graduation, Klink became a financial economic policy adviser at the Ministry of Economic Affairs, Agriculture and Innovation. He was promoted to senior policy officer of the agriculture and nature directorate-general in 2011 and held that same position at the ministry's directorate General Economic Policy starting in 2016. He kept working for the ministry until his appointment as alderman in 2018. Klink's family sold their 100 ha (250-acre) dairy farm with 230 cows in 2014, the year following its manager's death.

== Politics ==
=== Wijdemeren ===
Klink was the VVD's second candidate in Wijdemeren in the 2018 municipal elections after he had assisted the party's caucus in the municipal council for five months. He was elected and was installed as municipal councilor on 18 March. Klink left the council on 9 May to serve as alderman of finances, economic affairs, education, and the Environmental and Planning Act in Wijdemeren's new municipal executive.

At the end of the year, De Lokale Partij filed a censure motion against him, which was joined by the other opposition party in the council. They alleged that Klink had provided incomplete and partially false information to the council by saying that he was unsure of the cost of disbanding a municipal cooperation. Klink defended himself by saying that he only learned the cost four days after his comments. At the start of the COVID-19 pandemic in 2020, he announced that businesses would be able to postpone tax and other payments to the municipality.

=== House of Representatives ===
Klink was placed 35th on the VVD's party list in the 2021 general election. He received 1,092 preference votes, and his party won 34 seats, causing Klink to not be elected. He stepped down as alderman a few days later, because a better result for the VVD had been predicted based on preliminary results. He was appointed as the temporary replacement of House member Bas van 't Wout, who went on sick leave due to an occupational burnout, on 2 June 2021. Klink became a permanent member of the House of Representatives on 7 September following Dilan Yeşilgöz-Zegerius's resignation. His specialties in the House are international trade and development aid. He is on the Committees for Defense, for Economic Affairs and Climate Policy (chair), for European Affairs, for Foreign Affairs, for Foreign Trade and Development Cooperation, for the Interior (vice chair), and for Kingdom Relations as well as on the Benelux Parliament. After a snap election was called for November 2023, Klink announced he would not run for re-election to spend more time with his children.

He and his wife appeared 11th and 10th, respectively, on the VVD's party list in the 2022 municipal elections in Wijdemeren.

== Personal life ==
Klink has a wife named Irma, two daughters, and two sons, and he lives in the North Holland town of Loosdrecht. He and his wife own a bed and breakfast.

== Electoral history ==
Electoral history of Jan Klink
Year	Body	Party	Pos.	Votes	Result		Ref.
Year	Body	Party	Pos.	Votes	Party seats	Individual	Ref.
2021	House of Representatives	People's Party for Freedom and Democracy	35	1,092	34	Lost (Note: Klink was appointed to the body later during the term due to a vacancy.)	
