= Ministry of Foreign Affairs (Netherlands) =

Government ministry of the Netherlands

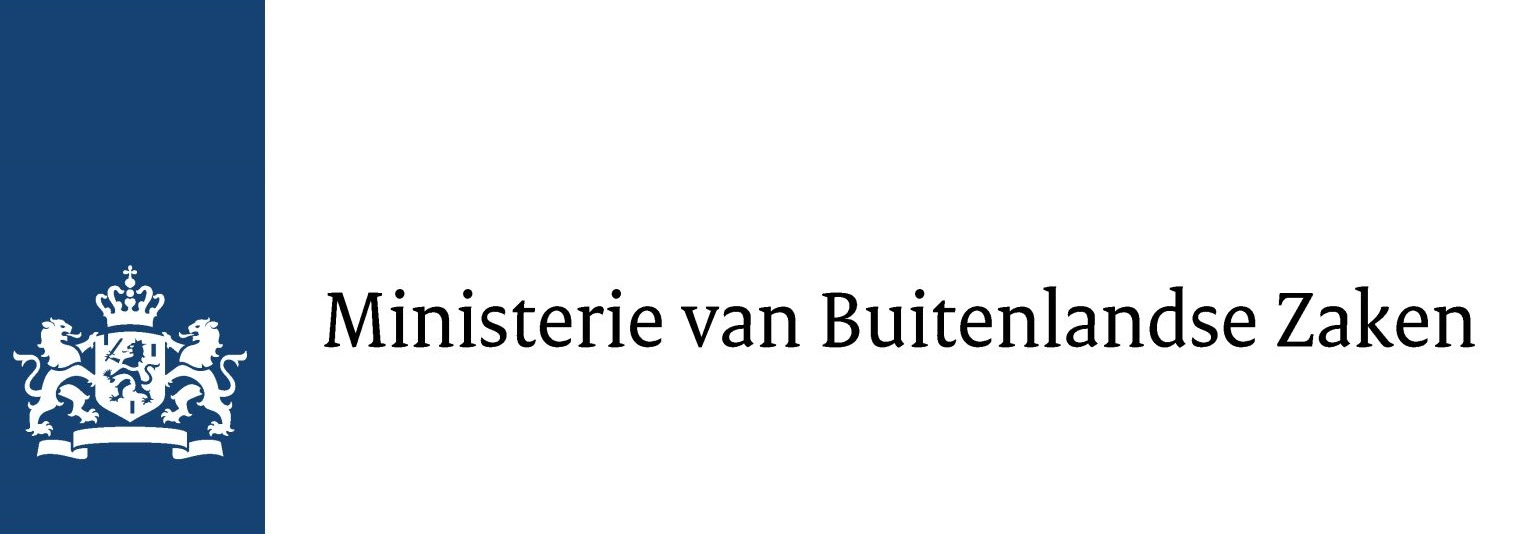

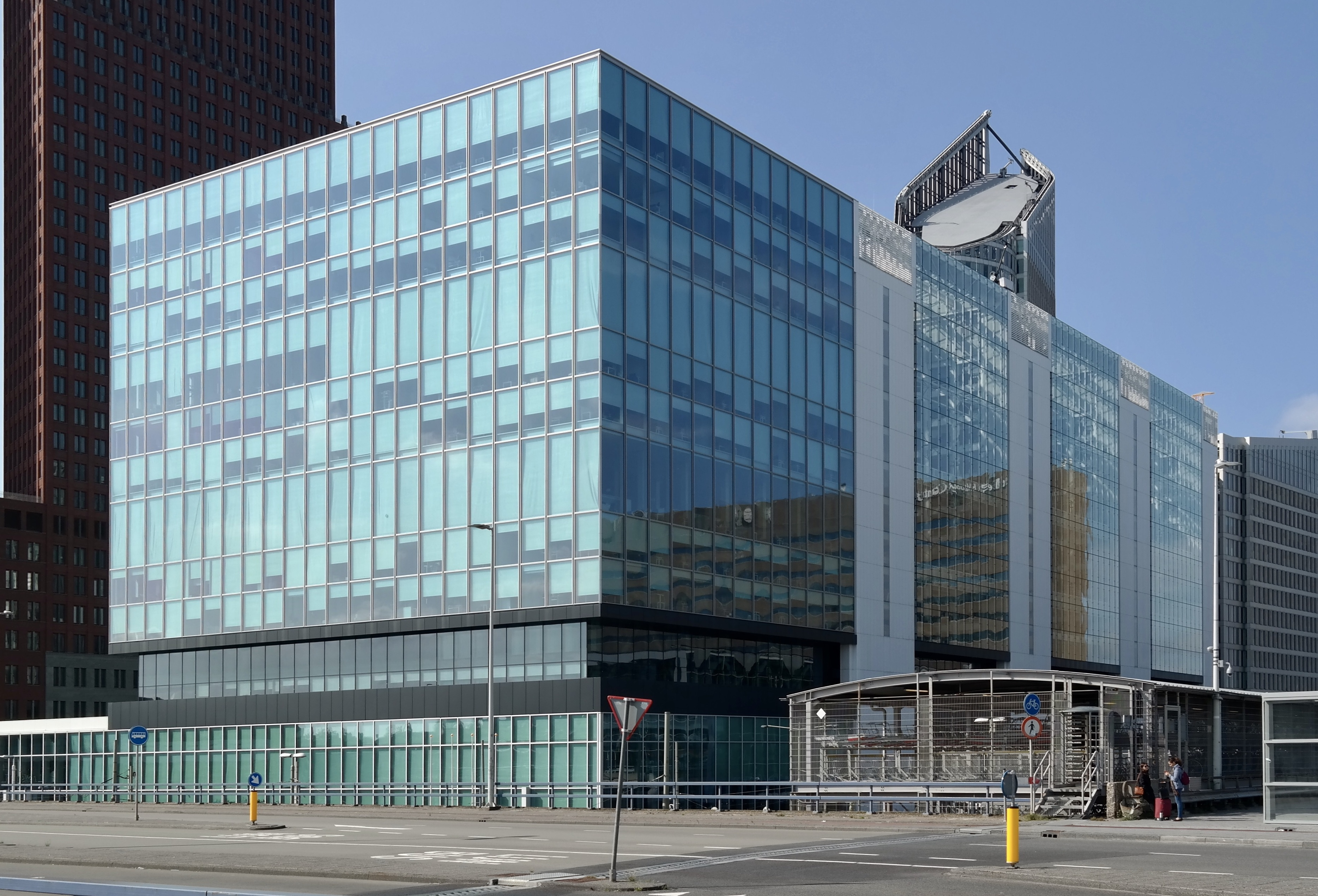
- Building of the Ministry of Foreign Affairs

Ministry overview
- Formed: 12 March 1798; 228 years ago
- Jurisdiction: Kingdom of the Netherlands
- Headquarters: Rijnstraat 8, The Hague
- Employees: 3,000
- Annual budget: €13 billion (2023)
- Minister responsible: Tom Berendsen, Minister of Foreign Affairs
- Deputy Minister responsible: Sjoerd Sjoerdsma, Minister of Foreign Trade and Development
- Ministry executive: Christiaan Rebergen, Secretary-General
- Website: Ministry of Foreign Affairs

The Ministry of Foreign Affairs (Dutch: Ministerie van Buitenlandse Zaken; BZ) is the Netherlands' ministry responsible for foreign relations, foreign policy, international development, international trade, diaspora and matters dealing with the European Union, NATO and the Benelux Union. The ministry was created in 1798, as the Department of Foreign Affairs of the Batavian Republic. In 1876, it became the Ministry of Foreign Affairs.

The Minister of Foreign Affairs is the head of the ministry and a member of the cabinet of the Netherlands, the incumbent minister is Tom Berendsen. The minister without portfolio on the ministry is Sjoerd Sjoerdsma, who is responsible for foreign trade and development aid.

== History ==
The Ministry was formed in 1798 as the Department of Foreign Affairs. Since 1965 a special Minister for International Development has been appointed in each government with the exception of the First Balkenende cabinet and the First Rutte cabinet).

== Responsibilities ==
The Ministry is responsible for the foreign relations of the Netherlands and its responsibilities are as follows:

- to maintain relations with other countries and international organisations.
- to promote cooperation with other countries.
- to help developing countries accelerate their social and economic development through international cooperation.
- to promote the interests of Dutch nationals and the Netherlands abroad.
- to collect information on other countries and international developments for the Government and other interested parties.
- to provide information on Dutch policy and the Netherlands' position on international issues and developments.
- to present the Netherlands to the world.
- to deal with applications from and the problems of foreigners living in the Netherlands or seeking to enter or leave the country.

== Organisation ==
The Minister of Foreign Affairs and the Minister for Foreign Trade and Development Cooperation provide political leadership to the Ministry. The ministry consists of four directorates-general, which deal with a particular policy area:

- The Directorate-General for Political Affairs is concerned with peace, security and human rights. This includes the EU's Common Foreign and Security Policy, the political role of NATO, the United Nations and the guidance for embassies and other diplomatic missions.
- The Directorate-General for European Cooperation concerns itself with the European Union. It is responsible for Dutch relations with EU members and candidate countries. It also coordinates policy in other regional organisations like the Council of Europe, the OECD and the Benelux .
- The Directorate-General for International Cooperation is responsible for international development, in line with the four Dutch priorities of water, security and the rule of law, food security and sexual and reproductive health and rights.
- The Directorate-General for Foreign Economic Relations promotes the interests of Dutch businesses abroad and helps shape the Dutch contribution to the global economic order.

The Netherlands has about 140 diplomatic missions abroad, see list of diplomatic missions of the Netherlands.

== International Institute for Communication and Development ==
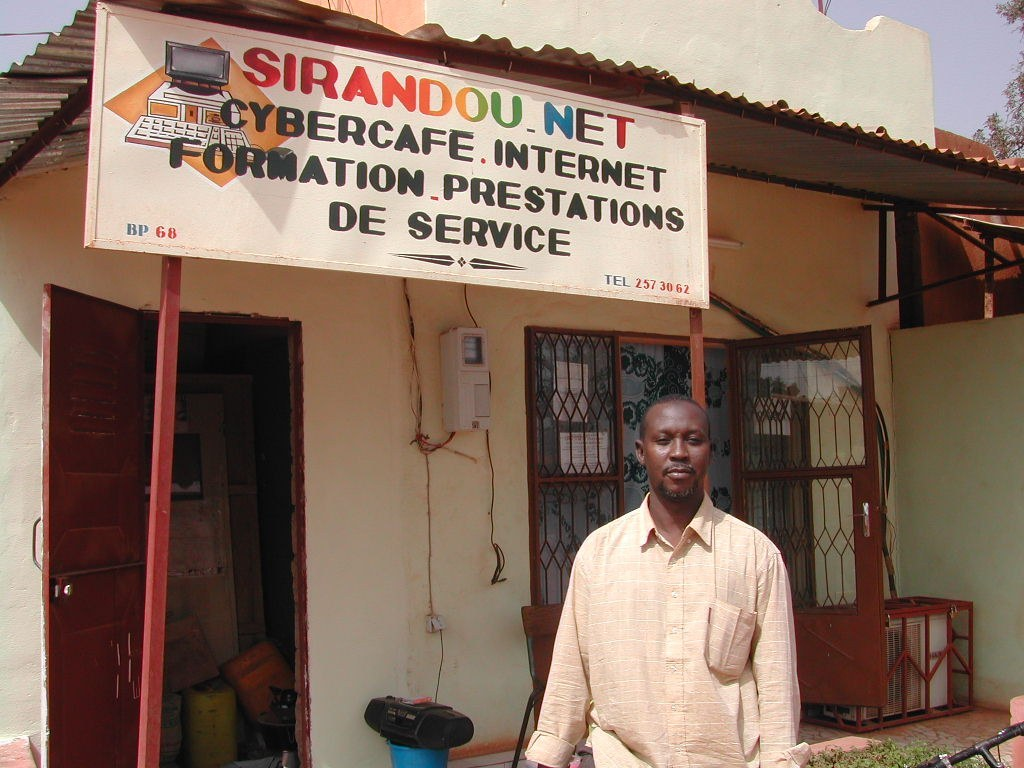
Sirandou.net cybercafe IICD Kita, Mali

The International Institute for Communication and Development (IICD) was a non-profit foundation established by the Ministry in 1996. IICD's aim was to support sustainable development through the use of information and communication technologies (ICTs), notably computers and the Internet.

The institute, which was based in The Hague, was active in nine developing countries: Bolivia, Burkina Faso, Ecuador, Ghana, Jamaica, Mali, Tanzania, Uganda and Zambia. IICD supported policy processes and projects involving the use of ICTs in the following sectors: health, education, "livelihoods" (mainly agriculture), and governance. IICD received funding from the Directorate-General for International Cooperation (DGIS) of the Netherlands, the UK Department for International Development (DFID) and the Swiss Agency for Development and Cooperation (SDC), amongst others.

IICD ceased operations on 31 December 2015.

== See also ==
- Minister of Foreign Affairs of the Netherlands
