= List of members of the House of Representatives of the Netherlands, 2025–present =

House of Representatives, 2025–present
←	2023–2025

Overview
- Legislative body: House of Representatives
- Meeting place: Bezuidenhoutseweg 67, The Hague
- Term: 12 November 2025 –
- Election: 2025
- Government: Jetten cabinet: D66 (26) VVD (22) CDA (18)
- Opposition: PVV (19) GL-PvdA/PRO (20) JA21 (9) FvD (7) Markuszower Group (ex-PVV) (7) BBB (3) SGP (3) CU (3) Denk (3) PvdD (3) SP (3) 50+ (2) Volt (1) Keijzer (ex-BBB) (1)
- Members: 150
- Speaker: Thom van Campen

Since 12 November 2025, 167 individuals have served as representatives in the House of Representatives, the 150-seat lower house of the States-General of the Netherlands. After the general election of 29 October 2025, 150 members were elected and installed at the start of the term. Thom van Campen was elected Speaker of the House of Representatives for this period.

After the election, the Jetten cabinet was formed consisting of Democrats 66 (D66, 26 seats), People's Party for Freedom and Democracy (VVD, 22 seats) and Christian Democratic Appeal (CDA, 18 seats). The opposition consisted of the following parties: Party for Freedom (PVV, 26 seats), GroenLinks–PvdA (GL-PvdA, 20 seats), JA21 (9 seats), Forum for Democracy (FvD, 7 seats), Farmer–Citizen Movement (BBB, 4 seats), Reformed Political Party (SGP, 3 seats), Denk (3 seats), Christian Union (CU, 3 seats), Party for the Animals (PvdD, 3 seats), Socialist Party (SP, 3 seats), 50PLUS (2 seats) and Volt (1 seat).

On 20 January 2026, seven members left the PVV parliamentary group and continued as the Markuszower Group. A month later, on 23 February, Mona Keijzer left the BBB parliamentary group and continued as independent. On 9 June 2026, the parliamentary group GroenLinks-PvdA was renamed Progressief Nederland (PRO).

== Members ==
All members are sworn in at the start of the term, even if they are not new. Assumed office in this list therefore refers to the swearing in during this term (or return date of members who went on parental or sick leave), while all members are automatically considered to have left office at the end of the term.

Name	Parliamentary group	Assumed office	Left office	Ref.
Thierry Aartsen	VVD	12 November 2025	22 February 2026 (Note: Left to join the cabinet)	
Ismail el Abassi	Denk	12 November 2025		
Fatihya Abdi	GL-PvdA (Note: Until 9 June 2026, because of a rename)	12 November 2025		
Fatihya Abdi	PRO (Note: Starting 9 June 2026, because of a rename)	12 November 2025		
Elles van Ark	CDA	12 November 2025		
Etkin Armut	CDA	12 November 2025		
Robert van Asten	D66	12 November 2025		
Stephan van Baarle	Denk	12 November 2025		
Mpanzu Bamenga	D66	12 November 2025		
Thierry Baudet	FvD	12 November 2025	11 January 2026 (Note: Left to focus on the campaign of the 2026 Dutch municipal elections.)	
Bente Becker	VVD	12 November 2025	16 November 2026 (Note: Temporarily replaced)	
Sandra Beckerman	SP	12 November 2025		
Martin de Beer	VVD	25 February 2026		
Fatimazhra Belhirch	D66	12 November 2025		
Daniël van den Berg	JA21	12 November 2025		
Nathalie van Berkel	D66	12 November 2025	17 February 2026 (Note: Left after it was revealed she had not completed her studies)	
Harry Bevers	VVD	12 November 2025	11 May 2026 (Note: Went on sick leave)	
Anouschka Biekman	D66	12 November 2025		
Mirjam Bikker	CU	12 November 2025		
Bart Bikkers	VVD	25 February 2026		
Iem al Biyati	FvD	1 September 2026		
Luciënne Boelsma-Hoekstra	CDA	12 November 2025		
Wimar Bolhuis	PRO	10 June 2026		
Henri Bontenbal	CDA	12 November 2025		
Diederik Boomsma	JA21	12 November 2025		
Maikel Boon	PVV	12 November 2025		
Martin Bosma	PVV	12 November 2025		
Derk Boswijk	CDA	12 November 2025	22 February 2026	
Ruben Brekelmans	VVD	12 November 2025		
Corrie van Brenk	50+	12 November 2025		
Bart van den Brink	CDA	12 November 2025	22 February 2026	
Tijs van den Brink	CDA	12 November 2025		
Laura Bromet	GL-PvdA	12 November 2025		
Laura Bromet	PRO	12 November 2025		
Judith Bühler	CDA	12 November 2025		
Eric van der Burg	VVD	12 November 2025	22 February 2026	
Julian Bushoff	GL-PvdA	12 November 2025		
Julian Bushoff	PRO	12 November 2025		
Thom van Campen	VVD	12 November 2025		
Don Ceder	CU	12 November 2025		
Simon Ceulemans	JA21	12 November 2025		
René Claassen	PVV (Note: Until 20 January 2026)	12 November 2025		
René Claassen	Markuszower (Note: Starting on 20 January 2026)	12 November 2025		
Ranjith Clemminck-Croci	JA21	12 November 2025		
Ingrid Coenradie	JA21	12 November 2025		
Laurens Dassen	Volt	12 November 2025		
Ralf Dekker	FvD	12 November 2025		
Teun van Dijck	PVV	12 November 2025		
Heera Dijk	D66	12 November 2025		
Jimmy Dijk	SP	12 November 2025		
Diederik van Dijk	SGP	12 November 2025		
Emiel van Dijk	PVV	12 November 2025		
Inge van Dijk	CDA	12 November 2025		
Sarah Dobbe	SP	12 November 2025		
Peter van Duyvenvoorde	FvD	12 November 2025		
Joost Eerdmans	JA21	12 November 2025		
Wendy van Eijk	VVD	12 November 2025		
Sarah El Boujdaini	D66	12 November 2025		
Ulysse Ellian	VVD	12 November 2025		
Doğukan Ergin	Denk	12 November 2025		
Silvio Erkens	VVD	12 November 2025	22 February 2026	
Marjolein Faber	PVV	12 November 2025		
André Flach	SGP	12 November 2025		
Maarten Goudzwaard	JA21	12 November 2025		
Dion Graus	PVV	12 November 2025		
Pieter Grinwis	CU	12 November 2025		
Dieke van Groningen	VVD	12 May 2026	30 August 2026	
Dieke van Groningen	VVD	17 November 2026		
Peter de Groot	VVD	12 November 2025		
Sarath Hamstra	CDA	12 November 2025		
Eelco Heinen	VVD	12 November 2025	22 February 2026	
Hidde Heutink	PVV	12 November 2025		
Hidde Heutink	Markuszower	12 November 2025		
Renate den Hollander	VVD	12 November 2025		
Michiel Hoogeveen	JA21	12 November 2025		
Habtamu de Hoop	GL-PvdA	12 November 2025		
Habtamu de Hoop	PRO	12 November 2025		
Pepijn van Houwelingen	FvD	12 November 2025		
Tamara ten Hove	PVV	12 November 2025		
Tamara ten Hove	Markuszower	12 November 2025		
Dion Huidekooper	D66	12 November 2025		
Renilde Huizenga	D66	12 November 2025		
Michelle Jagtenberg	D66	25 February 2026		
Chris Jansen	PVV	12 November 2025		
Freek Jansen	FvD	12 November 2025	12 May 2026	
Rob Jetten	D66	12 November 2025	22 February 2026	
Henk Jumelet	CDA	12 November 2025		
Vincent Karremans	VVD	12 November 2025	22 February 2026	
Barbara Kathmann	GL-PvdA	12 November 2025		
Barbara Kathmann	PRO	12 November 2025		
Mona Keijzer	BBB (Note: Until 23 February 2026)	12 November 2025		
Mona Keijzer	Keijzer (Note: Starting 23 February 2026)	12 November 2025		
Arend Kisteman	VVD	12 November 2025		
Jesse Klaver	GL-PvdA	12 November 2025		
Jesse Klaver	PRO	12 November 2025		
Felix Klos	D66	12 November 2025		
Jan Arie Koorevaar	CDA	12 November 2025		
Alexander Kops	PVV	12 November 2025		
Daan de Kort	VVD	12 November 2025		
Ulaş Köse	D66	12 November 2025		
Ines Kostić	PvdD	12 November 2025		
Suzanne Kröger	GL-PvdA	12 November 2025		
Suzanne Kröger	PRO	12 November 2025		
Harmen Krul	CDA	12 November 2025		
Esmah Lahlah	GL-PvdA	12 November 2025	9 June 2026 (Note: Left to become alderman of Amsterdam)	
Annelotte Lammers	PVV	12 November 2025		
Annelotte Lammers	Markuszower	12 November 2025		
Maes van Lanschot	CDA	12 November 2025		
Tom van der Lee	GL-PvdA	12 November 2025		
Tom van der Lee	PRO	12 November 2025		
Robin van Leijen	D66	25 February 2026		
Joris Lohman	CDA	25 February 2026		
Erik van der Maas	VVD	25 February 2026		
Vicky Maeijer	PVV	12 November 2025		
Nicole Maes	VVD	25 February 2026		
Gidi Markuszower	PVV	12 November 2025		
Gidi Markuszower	Markuszower	12 November 2025		
Claire Martens	VVD	12 November 2025		
Mahjoub Mathlouti	D66	25 February 2026		
Rachel van Meetelen	PVV	12 November 2025		
Gideon van Meijeren	FvD	12 November 2025		
Wim Meulenkamp	VVD	25 February 2026		
Ingrid Michon-Derkzen	VVD	12 November 2025		
Mohammed Mohandis	GL-PvdA	12 November 2025		
Mohammed Mohandis	PRO	12 November 2025		
Nicole Moinat	PVV	12 November 2025		
Nicole Moinat	Markuszower	12 November 2025		
Jeremy Mooiman	PVV	12 November 2025		
Marjolein Moorman	GL-PvdA	12 November 2025		
Marjolein Moorman	PRO	12 November 2025		
Edgar Mulder	PVV	12 November 2025		
Alisha Müller	VVD	25 February 2026		
Songül Mutluer	GL-PvdA	12 November 2025		
Songül Mutluer	PRO	12 November 2025		
Annabel Nanninga	JA21	12 November 2025		
Stephan Neijenhuis	D66	12 November 2025		
Jurgen Nobel	VVD	12 November 2025		
Sjoukje van Oosterhout	GL-PvdA	12 November 2025		
Sjoukje van Oosterhout	PRO	12 November 2025		
Henk-Jan Oosterhuis	D66	12 November 2025		
Ouafa Oualhadj	D66	12 November 2025		
Esther Ouwehand	PvdD	12 November 2025		
Jan Paternotte	D66	12 November 2025		
Mariëtte Patijn	GL-PvdA	12 November 2025		
Mariëtte Patijn	PRO	12 November 2025		
Wieke Paulusma	D66	12 November 2025		
Kati Piri	GL-PvdA	12 November 2025		
Kati Piri	PRO	12 November 2025		
Caroline van der Plas	BBB	12 November 2025		
Anne-Marijke Podt	D66	12 November 2025		
André Poortman	CDA	25 February 2026		
Erwin Prickaertz	PVV	12 November 2025		
Annette Raijer	PVV	12 November 2025		
Queeny Rajkowski	VVD	12 November 2025	30 March 2026 (Note: Went on maternity leave)	
Queeny Rajkowski	VVD	20 July 2026		
Ilana Rooderkerk	D66	12 November 2025		
Raymond de Roon	PVV	12 November 2025		
Tom Russcher	FvD	15 January 2026		
Milan Schenk	FvD	19 May 2026		
Shanna Schilder	PVV	12 November 2025		
Shanna Schilder	Markuszower	12 November 2025		
Jan Schoonis	D66	12 November 2025		
Björn Schutz	VVD	12 November 2025		
Joost Sneller	D66	12 November 2025		
Hanneke Steen	CDA	12 November 2025		
Chris Stoffer	SGP	12 November 2025		
Sebastiaan Stöteler	PVV	12 November 2025		
Jeltje Straatman	CDA	12 November 2025		
Jan Struijs	50+	12 November 2025		
Luc Stultiens	GL-PvdA	12 November 2025		
Luc Stultiens	PRO	12 November 2025		
Marijke Synhaeve	D66	12 November 2025		
Christine Teunissen	PvdD	12 November 2025		
Eveline Tijmstra	CDA	12 November 2025		
Mikal Tseggai	GL-PvdA	12 November 2025		
Mikal Tseggai	PRO	12 November 2025		
Marieke Vellinga-Beemsterboer	D66	12 November 2025		
Ruud Verkuijlen	VVD	31 March 2026	20 July 2026	
Ruud Verkuijlen	VVD	2 September 2026		
Henk Vermeer	BBB	12 November 2025		
Marc Vervuurt	D66	12 November 2025		
Hans Vijlbrief	D66	12 November 2025	22 February 2026	
Lisa Vliegenthart	GL-PvdA	12 November 2025		
Lisa Vliegenthart	PRO	12 November 2025		
Elmar Vlottes	PVV	12 November 2025		
Marina Vondeling	PVV	12 November 2025		
Lidewij de Vos	FvD	12 November 2025	5 August 2026	
Hilde Wendel	VVD	12 November 2025		
Hanneke van der Werf	D66	12 November 2025		
Lisa Westerveld	GL-PvdA	12 November 2025		
Lisa Westerveld	PRO	12 November 2025		
Femke Wiersma	BBB	12 November 2025		
Geert Wilders	PVV	12 November 2025		
Dilan Yeşilgöz	VVD	12 November 2025	22 February 2026	
Ani Zalinyan	GL-PvdA	12 November 2025		
Ani Zalinyan	PRO	12 November 2025		
Jantine Zwinkels	CDA	12 November 2025		

== See also ==
- List of candidates in the 2025 Dutch general election
