= Sneller =

Sneller is a surname. Notable people with the surname include:

- Joost Sneller (born 1982), Dutch politician
- Tim Sneller (1956–2024), American politician
