= Ranjith Clemminck-Croci =

Dutch politician

Member of the House of Representatives
- Incumbent
- Assumed office 12 November 2025

Personal details
- Born: 12 January 1986 (age 40) Ratnapura, Sri Lanka
- Citizenship: Netherlands
- Party: JA21 (since 2024)
- Other political affiliations: PvdA (2006–2024)
- Education: Willem II College
- Alma mater: Breda University of Applied Sciences

D.R.F. "Ranjith" Clemminck-Croci (12 January 1986) is a Sri Lankan-born Dutch politician for the JA21 party. In the 2025 Dutch general election, he was 9th on the candidate list for the Dutch House of Representatives elections.

== Biography ==
=== Early life and career ===
Clemminck-Croci was born in Sri Lanka and raised in North Brabant, by his adoptive Dutch family. He completed his secondary education at the Willem II College in Tilburg. He then completed a vocational degree in accounting at the Avans University of Applied Sciences before obtaining a bachelor's degree in history and political sciences and then a master's degree in political science at Radboud University. During his studies he worked for the Wiardi Beckman Stichting, a think-tank associated with the PvdA.

After graduating, Clemminck-Croci was employed as a project manager for various government organisations including the Province of North Brabant and later for Amnesty International until 2019. He was then a corporate strategist for the municipality of 's-Hertogenbosch. He was also a board member for Utrecht Pride but was allegedly dismissed from the job due to his membership of JA21.

=== Political career ===
Clemminck-Croci was a member of the Dutch Labour Party during his time at university before joining JA21. He stood in ninth place on JA21's list for the 2025 Dutch general election. In November 2025 it was confirmed that he had been elected to the House of Representatives.

=== Personal life ===
Clemminck-Croci is openly gay. In 2022, he married an Italian man.

== See also ==
- List of members of the House of Representatives of the Netherlands, 2025–present
