= Constant Cornelis Huijsmans =

Dutch art teacher and painter (1810–1886)

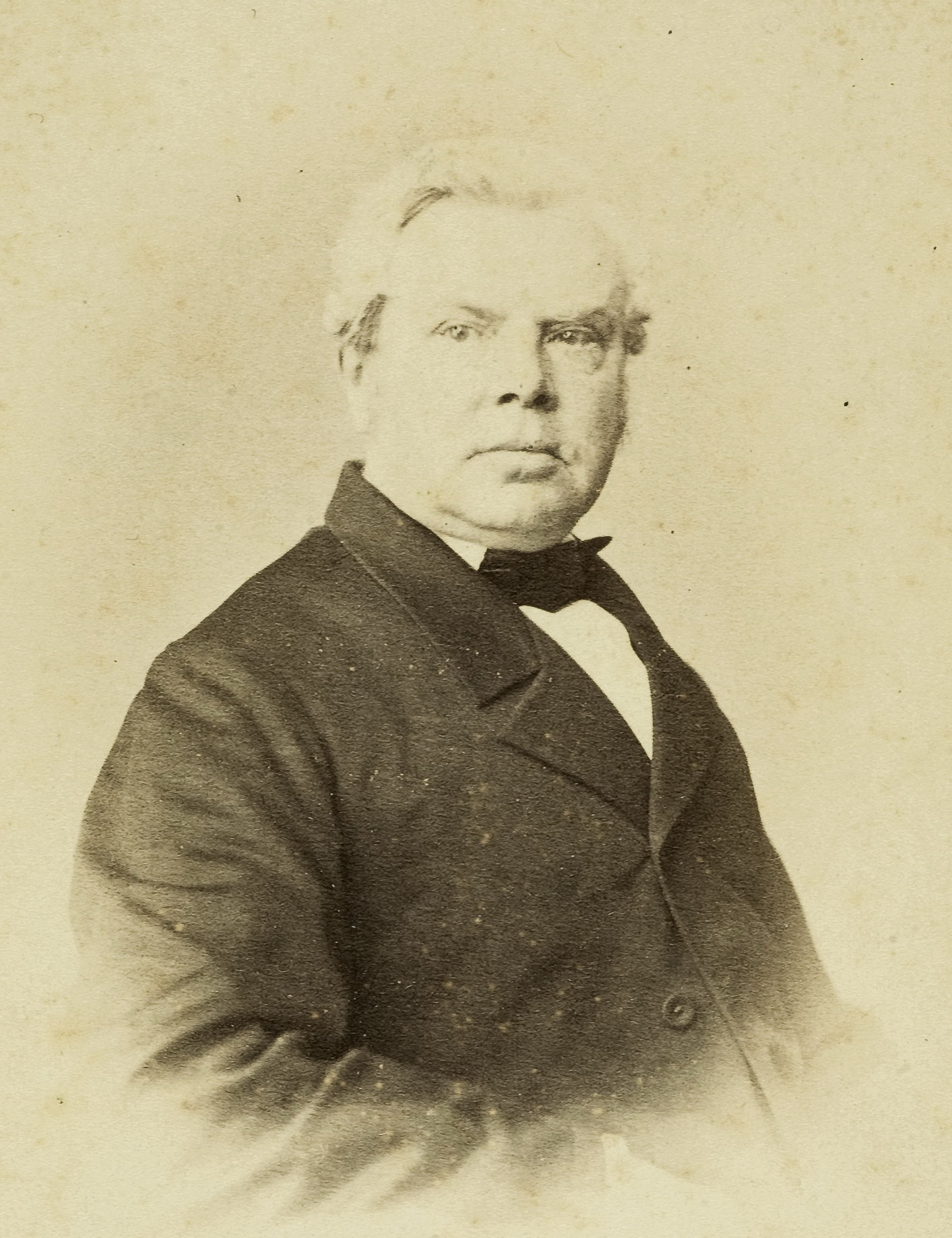
- Born: 1 January 1810; Breda, Netherlands
- Died: 28 November 1886; The Hague, Netherlands
- Known for: Painting
- Movement: Romanticism

Constant Cornelis Huijsmans (1 January 1810 – 28 November 1886) was a Dutch art teacher and painter, whose roots go back to the seventeenth-century Antwerp of the landscape painter Cornelis Huysmans (1648–1727). Paintings of the latter are to be found at the Louvre in Paris and at the Hermitage Museum in Saint Petersburg, Russia. Earlier generations of the Huijsmans family used to spell their family name slightly differently, as Huysmans.

== Early life and family ==
Constant Cornelis Huijsmans was born in Breda on 1 January 1810. He was not only a painter but he was the Principal of the Art Academy in Breda as well as a teacher at the Royal Military Academy, also in Breda. He was the son of the painter and chemist Jacobus Carolus Huijsmans and Maria Elisabeth Beens. In 1854 he married Ludovica Francisca Kerstens (1823–1855), whose father was the owner of a successful brewery in Breda. The French author Joris-Karl Huysmans (Charles-Marie-Georges Huijsmans, 1848–1907) was his nephew. On the occasion of the latter's first major publication of a collection of French poems Huijsmans wrote in a letter dated 26 December 1874 to his nephew “by the way, your name in Dutch is Joris-Karel Huijsmans … you wrote [Jorris-Karl] which is German”.

== Training and early work (1828–1840) ==
Early years between 1828 and 1840 in Antwerp, Paris and Breda

Huijsmans studied at the Royal Academy of Fine Arts in Antwerp and at the Academy of Fine Art in Paris. Initially, he specialized in romantic landscapes, but later he turned to interior scenes. Several of his sketchbooks have survived and some of his early paintings are known. In 1835 he returned home because of his father's going blind. As the eldest of eight children he took upon himself the task to support his family financially and to succeed his father who had been an art teacher at the Art Academy as well as at the Royal Military Academy, both located in Breda. In 1838 Huijsmans became close friends with Pieter Johannes Veth (1814-1895), his colleague (until 1841) at the Koninklijke Militaire Academie. Veth later became professor of Ethnology of the Dutch East Indies at the University of Leiden and the first Chairman of the Royal Netherlands Geographical Society. They kept up a correspondence until Huijsmans died in 1886. Huijsmans managed to combine both his teaching job and his painting and took part in various national exhibitions.

== Art teaching career (1840–1879) ==
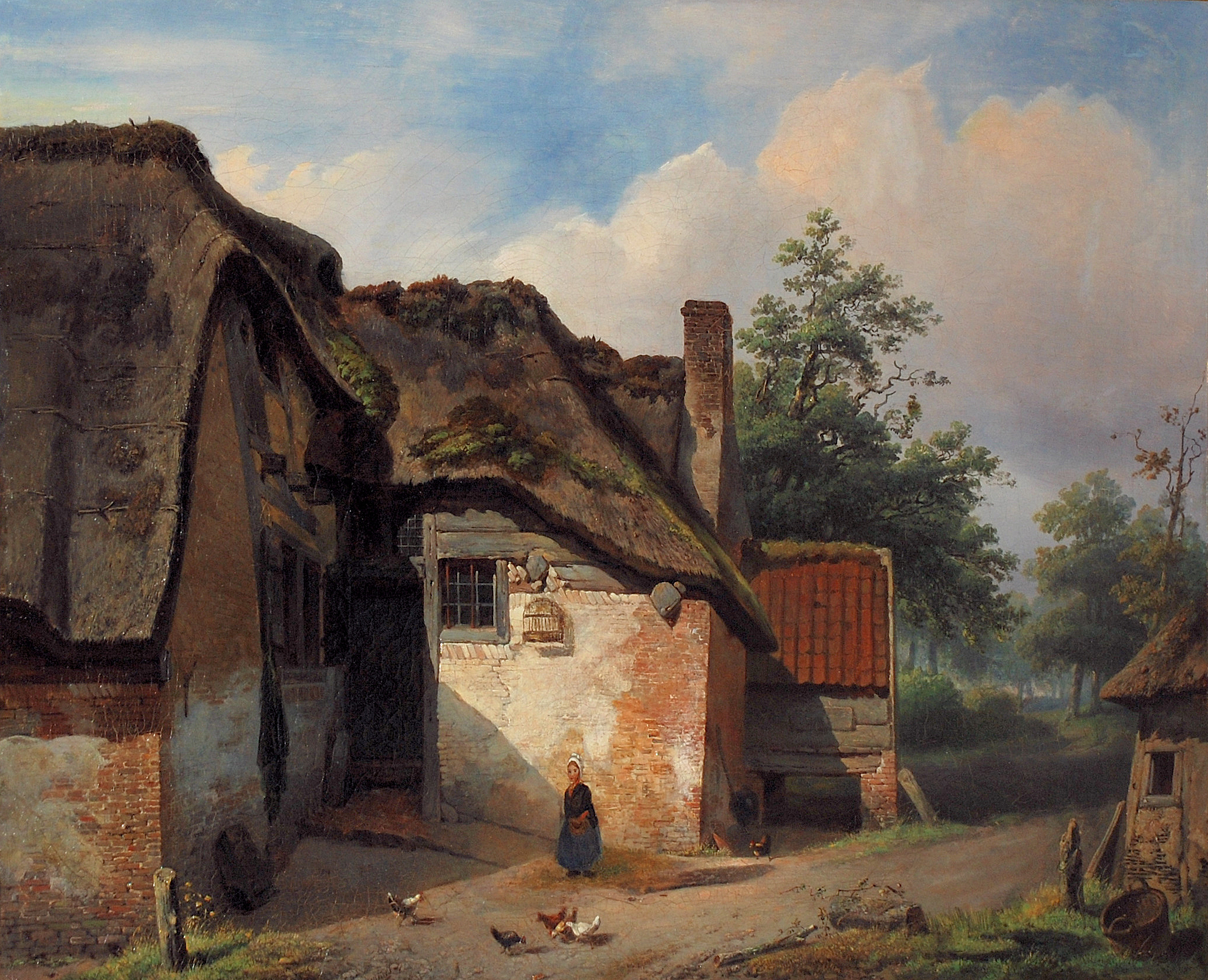
Farm-house in Brabants landscape, 1849 (75 x 60 cm).

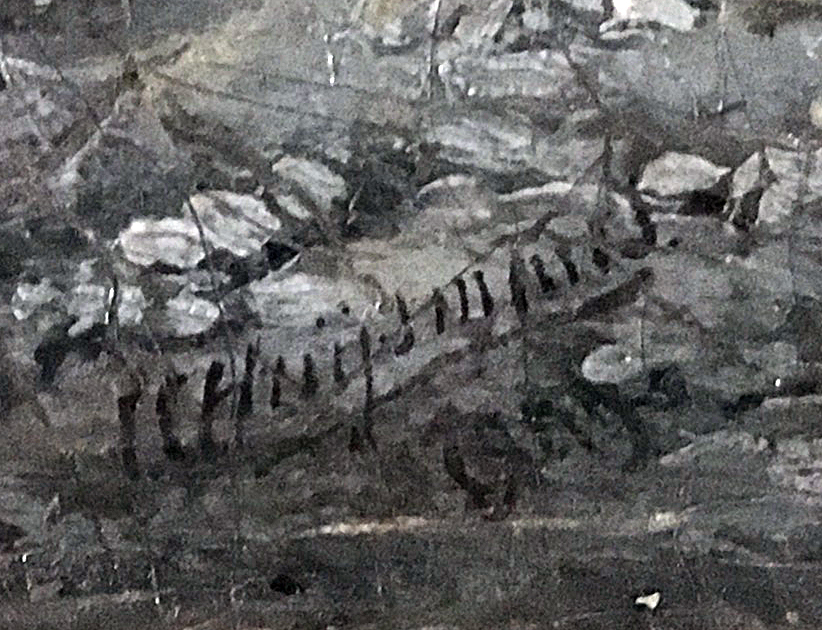
Signature of C.C.Huijsmans (1810-1886) on his painting Farm-house in Brabants landscape, 1849.

Huijsmans developed two art teaching methods and he used these methods himself in his art classes. Some institutions such as the Royal Academy of Fine Arts (Rijksakademie van beeldende kunsten) in Amsterdam employed his approach as well. Huijsmans was the first in The Netherlands to dedicate himself to the professionalization of the subject of art teaching. His first art teaching method was called Het landschap (The Landscape), developed and published in 1840. It became a bestseller. The art dealer Vincent van Gogh ("uncle Cent", the uncle of Vincent van Gogh) subscribed to this new teaching method. In 1845 King William II of the Netherlands bought Huijsmans’ painting Interior of a House in North Brabant. This seemed the beginning of success for Huijsmans. In fact, King Willem II owned another painting by Huijsmans which the King must have bought just before or in 1849. It was described as Interior with a woman and a child (Intérieur avec une femme et un enfant, 51 x 64 cm, painted on wood) in the auction catalogue of 1851 (see lot number 244, p. 51), which listed all the paintings to be sold after the death of King William II (1792-1849). However, in 1851 Huijsmans decided to give up painting completely and to concentrate on teaching. In 1852 he developed a second teaching method Grondbeginselen der Teekenkunst, eene theoretische en practische Handleiding om het teekenen grondig te leeren (Principles of Art Teaching, a Theoretical and Practical Manual). Between 1853 and 1872 he published articles in several magazines, such as De Gids. As a result of the mediation of Dutch statesman and minister of liberal signature, Johan Rudolph Thorbecke, Huijsmans obtained in 1865 the important position of art teacher at the new and prestigious Willem II College in Tilburg, a school commissioned by King William II himself. The school was housed in the former royal palace, now the City Hall of Tilburg, but moved in 1934 to a new location.

=== Vincent van Gogh ===
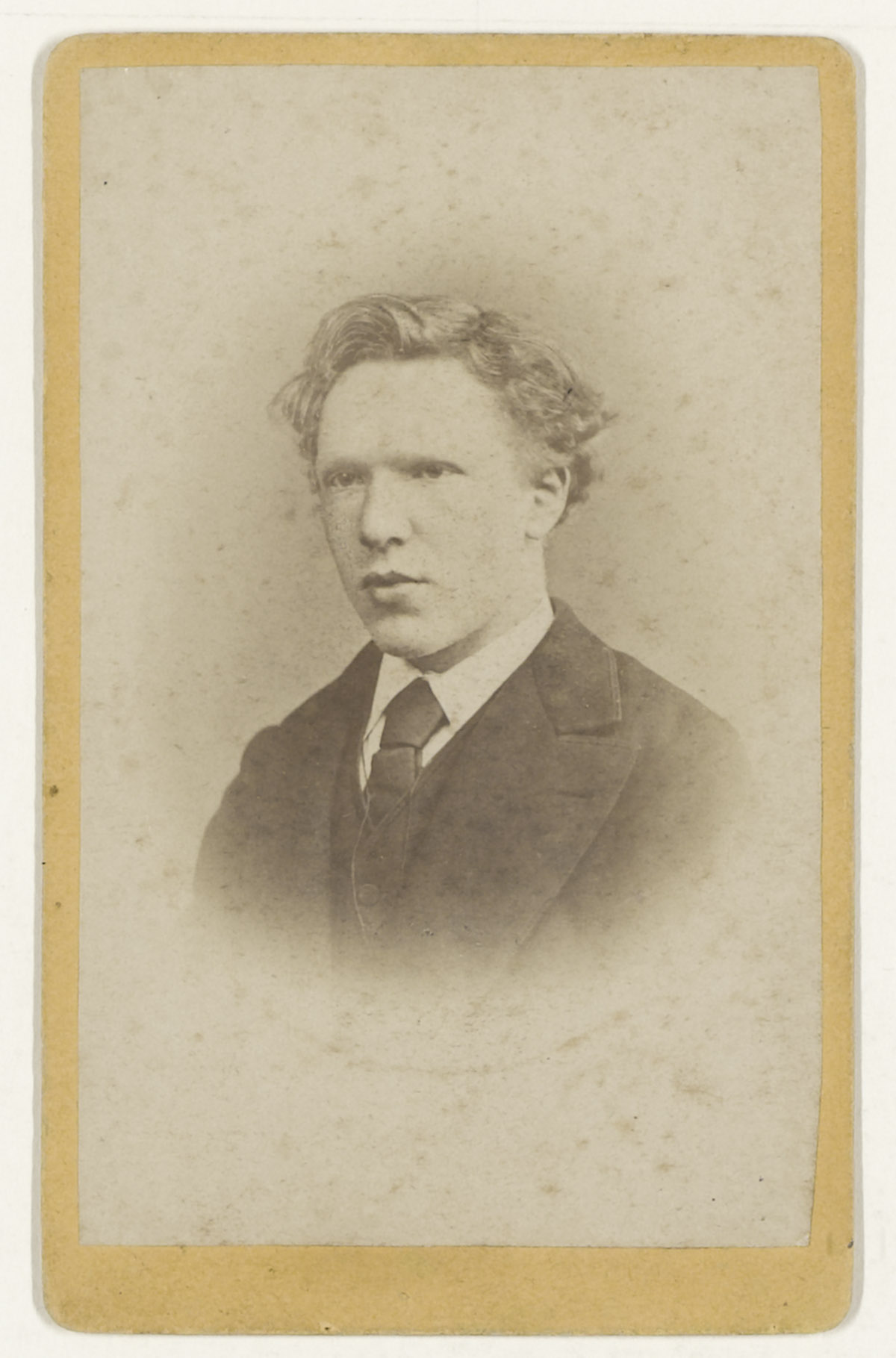
Vincent van Gogh aged about 19 years

During Huijsmans' years as art teacher at the Willem II College in Tilburg, Dutch painter Vincent van Gogh was the school's and Huijsmans’ most famous student between 15 September 1866 and 19 March 1868. Van Gogh (1853–1890) had initially been taught at home by his mother and a governess, and later attended the village school in Groot-Zundert, in North Brabant. In 1864 he was sent to a boarding school at Zevenbergen, but in 1866 his parents decided to send him to the new and prestigious Willem II College in Tilburg. In March 1868 Van Gogh suddenly returned home. One drawing of two men with shovels (1867) has survived from this period in the life of Vincent van Gogh. A year later, in July 1869, Van Gogh obtained his first job with an art dealer Goupil & Cie in The Hague, through the mediation of his uncle Cent (Vincent van Gogh, 1820-1888), also an art dealer in The Hague. Huijsmans remained an art teacher at the Willem II College until 1877.

== Later years and death (1879–1886) ==
In 1879 Huijsmans moved to The Hague together with his sister Oda. Huijsmans died in The Hague on 28 November 1886 at the age of 76.

== Library ==
Huijsmans had built up an interesting library with works from e.g. Leonardo da Vinci, Giorgio Vasari and Karel van Mander, as well as six books by Jan Luyken, and many, mostly French, poetry collections. There are six letters from him to the famous Dutch William Shakespeare translator, Leendert Burgersdijk. They knew each other well and Burgersdijk would regularly ask Huijsmans for comments on the translations.

== A watercolour and three etchings ==
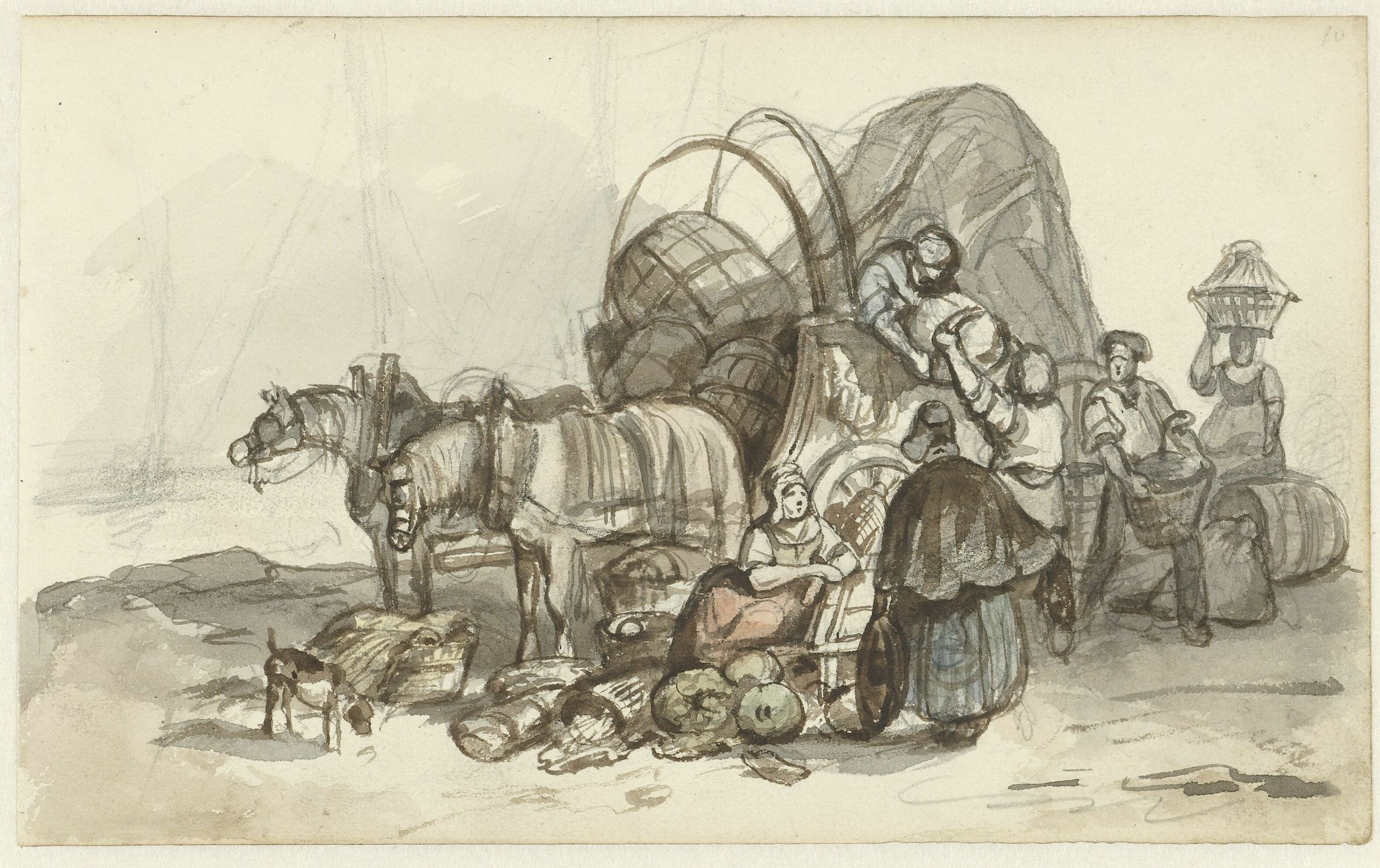
Unloading of a wagon, Rijksmuseum, Amsterdam.

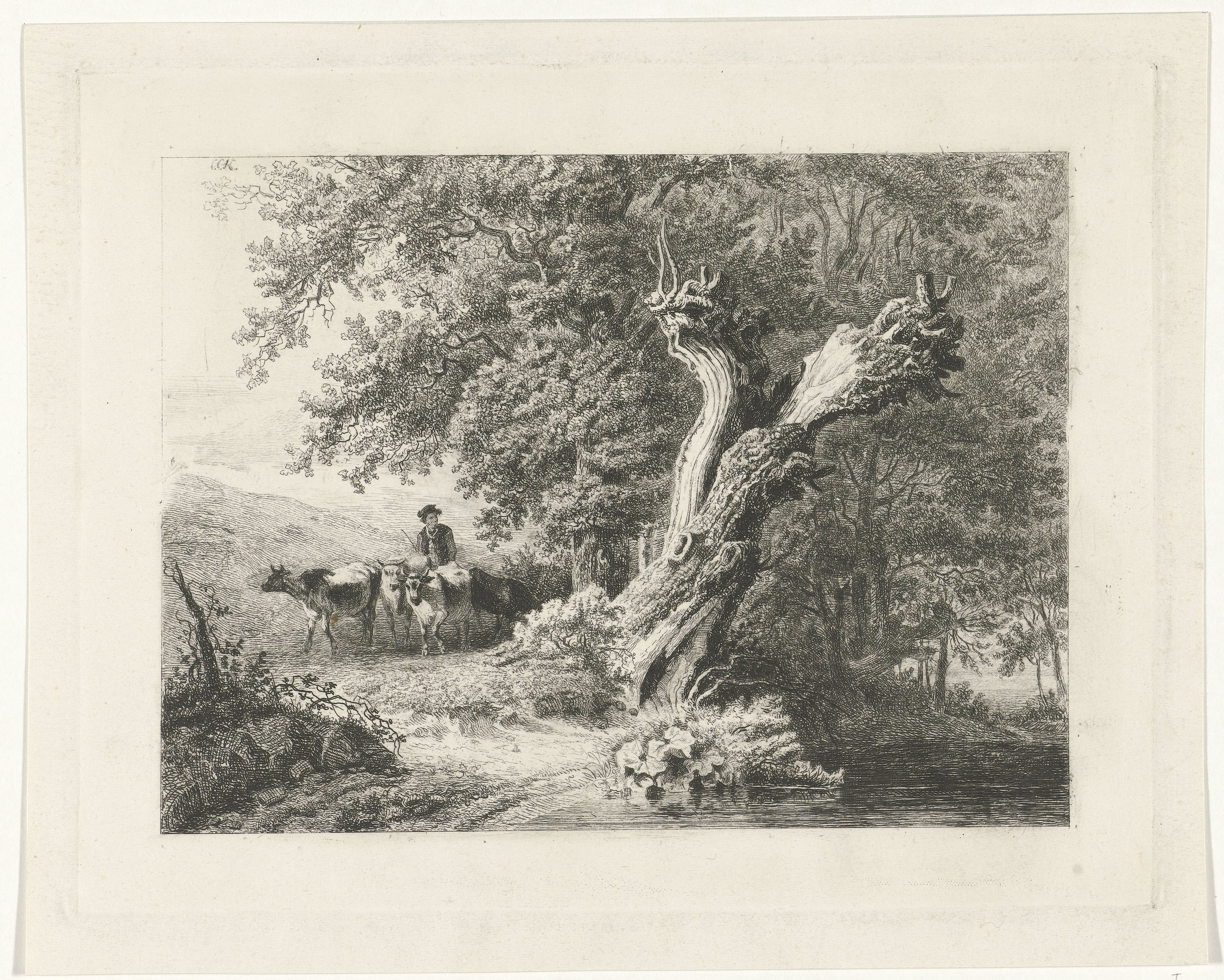
Landscape with a leafless tree and a shepherd, signed by C.C. Huijsmans with C.C.H., Rijksmuseum, Amsterdam.

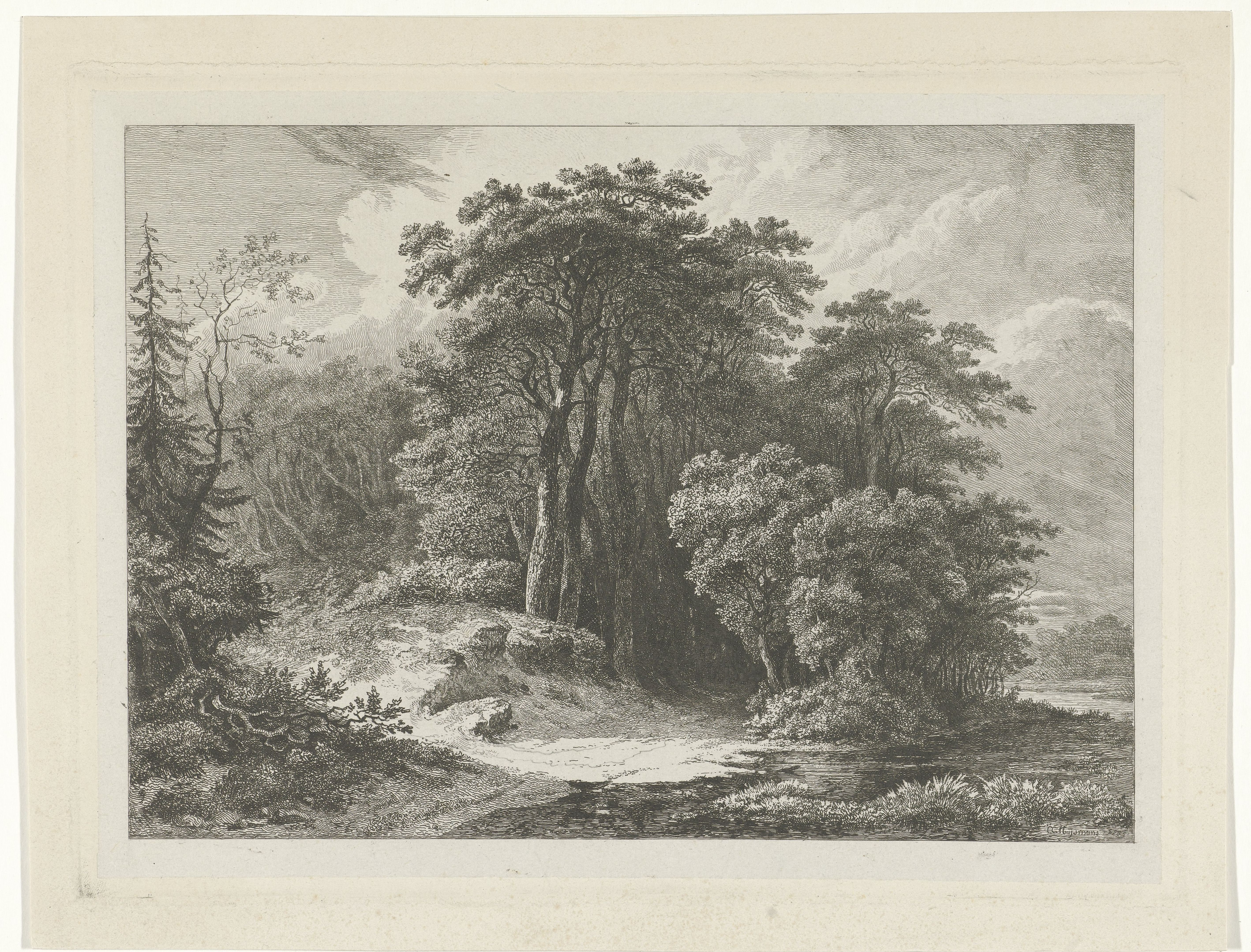
Forest landscape, signed by C.C. Huijsmans, Rijksmuseum, Amsterdam.

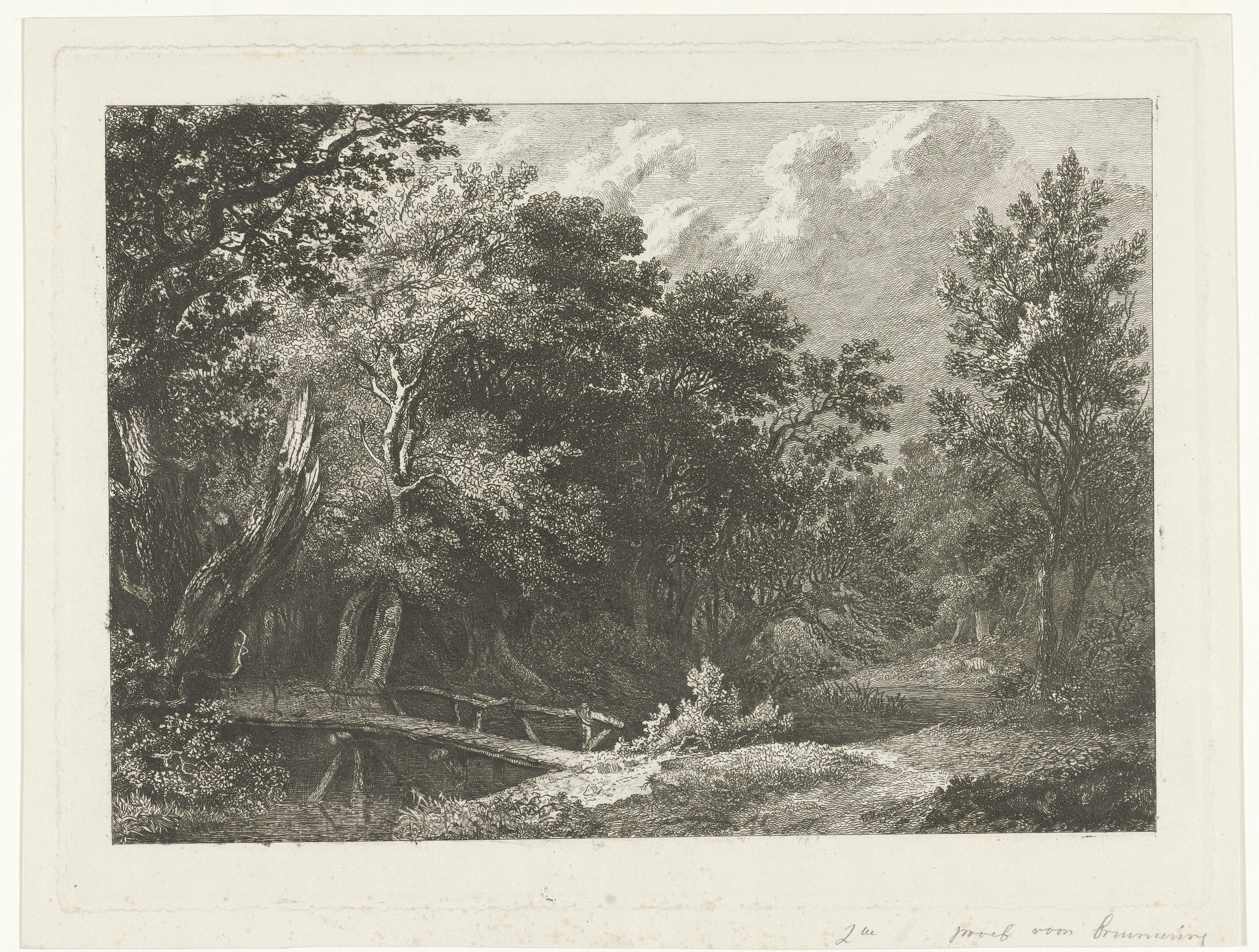
Forest landscape with wooden bridge, signed by C.C. Huijsmans, Rijksmuseum, Amsterdam.
