= Erik van der Maas =

Dutch politician (born 1968)

Member of the House of Representatives
- Incumbent
- Assumed office 25 February 2026

Member of the States-Provincial of North Holland
- In office 28 March 2019 – 28 March 2023

Personal details
- Born: 19 November 1968 (age 57) Netherlands
- Party: People's Party for Freedom and Democracy
- Education: Leiden University
- Website: www.vvd.nl/profielen/erik-van-der-maas/

Erik van der Maas (born 19 November 1968) is a Dutch politician who has served as a member of the House of Representatives for the People's Party for Freedom and Democracy (VVD) since 2026.

== Career ==
After studying law at Leiden University, he worked in the energy sector.

== See also ==
- List of members of the House of Representatives of the Netherlands, 2025–present
