= City Hall of Tilburg =

Coordinates: 51°33′16.97″N 5°5′12.71″E

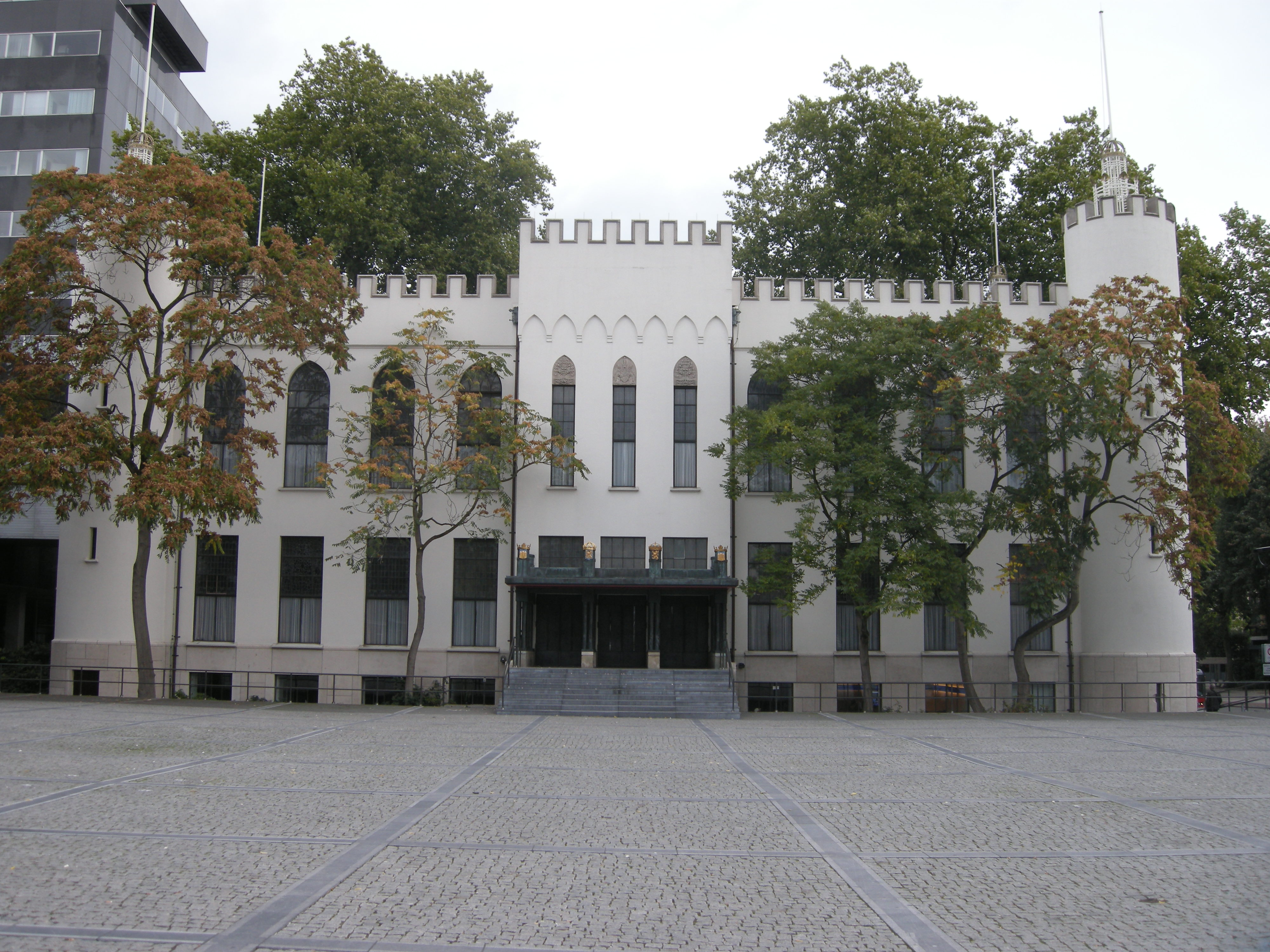
The Paleis-Raadhuis, the city hall of municipality Tilburg.

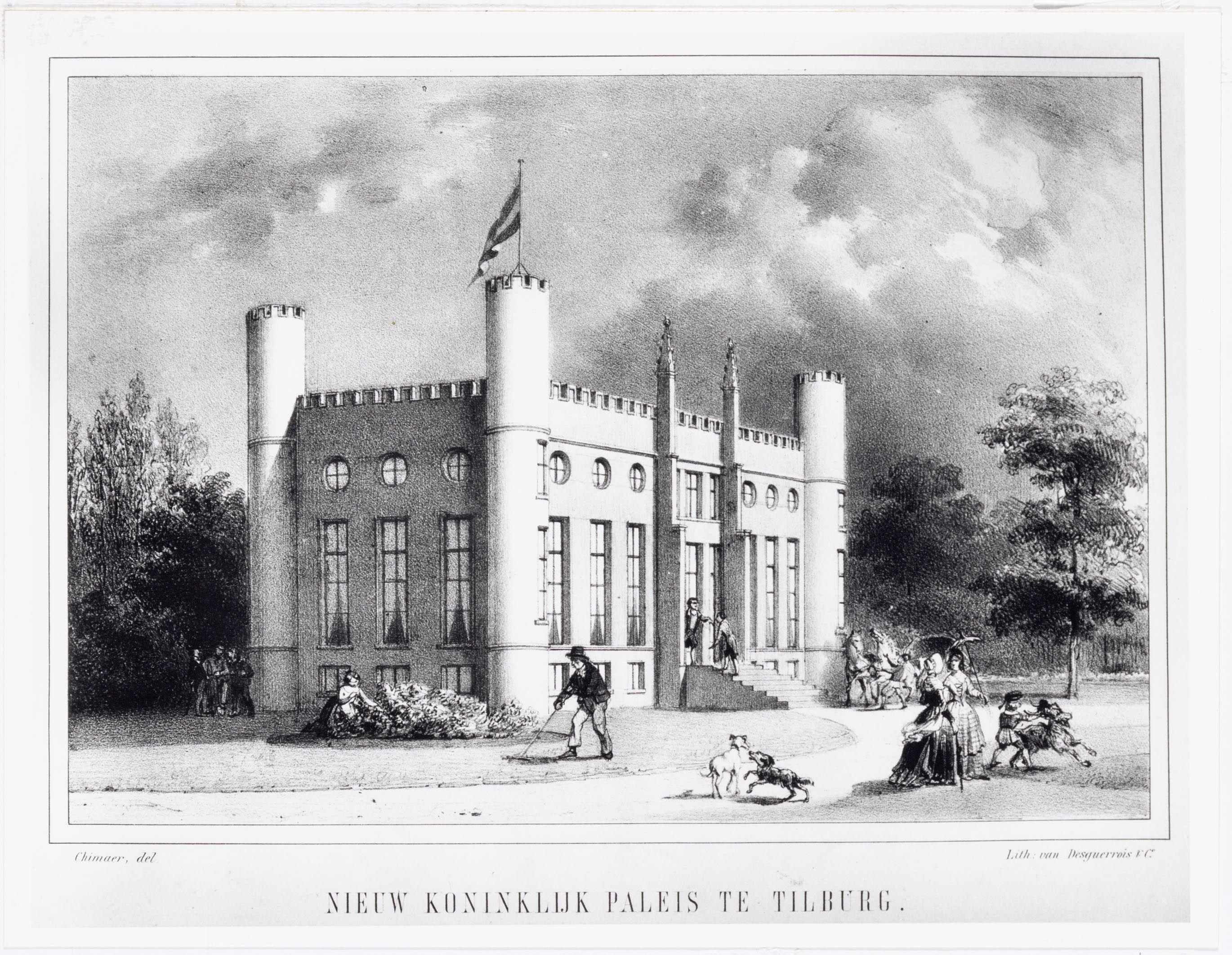
Lithography by Wilhelmus Cornelius Chimaer van Oudendorp (1822-1873) of the New Royal Palace in Tilburg in 1849. In the drawing there's a mistake. The artist drew in the façade of the palace only six of the original eight windows on both sides of the entrance adjoining series of windows.

The City Hall of Tilburg or Palace-Council House (Dutch: Paleis-Raadhuis) is a former royal palace and presently a part of Tilburg city hall in the Netherlands. Construction of the palace was commissioned by King William II of the Netherlands, who placed the cornerstone on 13 August 1847. The King wanted to have a country residence in Tilburg. He never lived in the palace as he died on 17 March 1849, just 22 days before completion of the palace.

The palace was built by contractor and carpenter Adriaan Goijaerts from Tilburg. On 7 July 1847 Goijaerts accepted the commission from William II of the Netherlands for the sum of ƒ 57,000. Goijaerts completed the palace on 7 April 1849.

The palace has been rebuilt thoroughly twice, in 1865 and from 1934 to 1936, to give the palace a different purpose. The palace has been used as a school and as city hall of the municipality Tilburg. The school offered secular tuition on high school level. Dutch painter Vincent van Gogh was the school’s most famous student.

In 1931 the palace was donated to Tilburg municipality by the Dutch royal family. During World War II the palace was used as an observation post for detecting allied aeroplanes. The palace lost its main function in 1971 when a much larger and more modern building was completed. This building is connected to the palace through a sky bridge at the north side of the palace. Since then the Palace is mostly used as a location for wedding ceremonies, lectures, oath-takings and symposia.

== Construction ==
=== Location ===
The new royal palace was built in the backyard of a former royal residence. This former residence was actually a connected row of houses. In 1835 the Prince of Orange bought these houses behind the church of Saint Denis from a family called Frankenhoff and had them rebuilt into a sober palace. When William succeeded his father as king of the Netherlands in 1840 the palace didn’t have the royal quality befitting his new status. A new palace had to be constructed. The former palace was demolished in 1847.

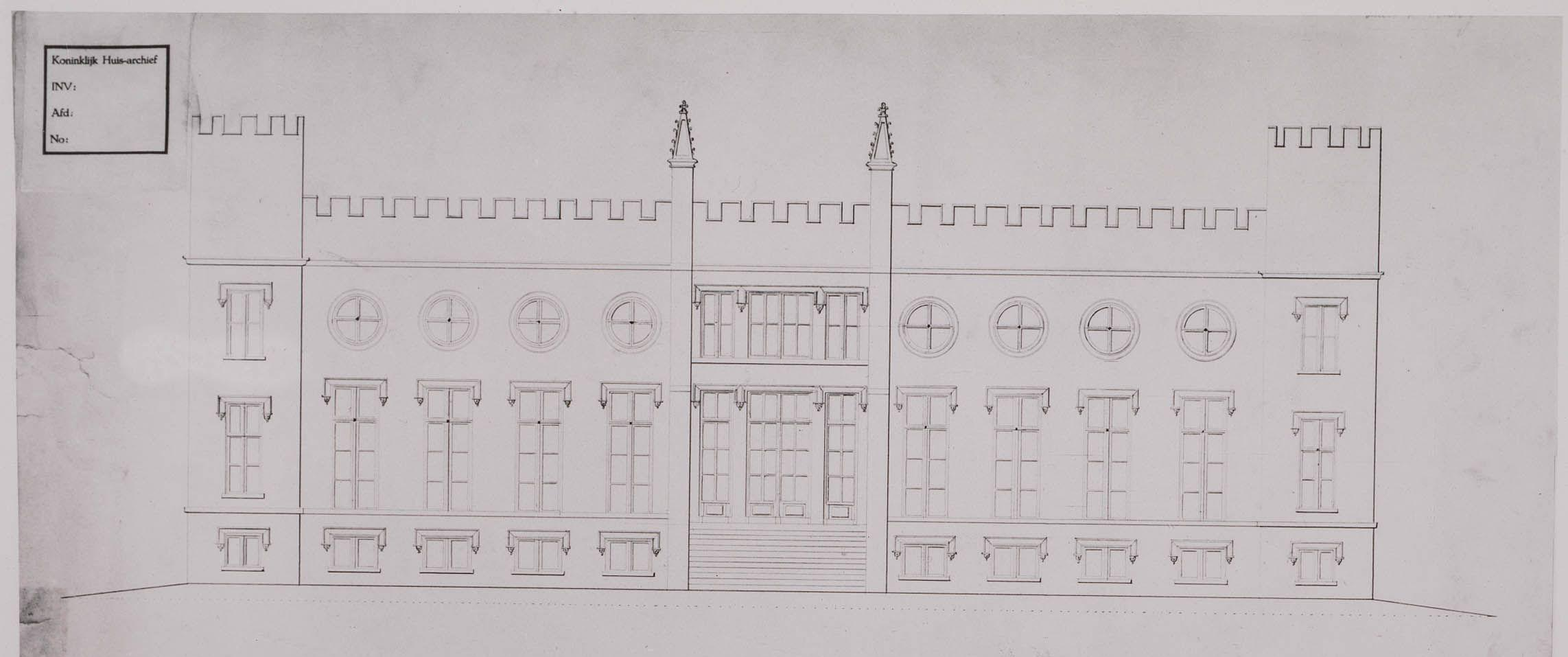
Façade of the palace on a draft of the palace around 1845.

=== Design ===
According to legend King William II made the first sketches for the palace himself, following the neo-gothic building style he knew from his childhood in England. It’s very likely that drawing teacher Frederik Lodewijk Huijgens of the royal military academy in Breda and royal master builder Jan C. Boon were involved into the design.

The building's basement is about 60% subterranean and 40% above ground. This was common among houses, castles and palaces at the time. On top of the basement sits the piano nobile, the most important and impressive floor of the building, primarily used for receiving guests. Notable to the design are the four round towers at each of the four corners of the building. These form four independent stairwells and lead from the basement up to the piano nobile and the second floor.

== School ==
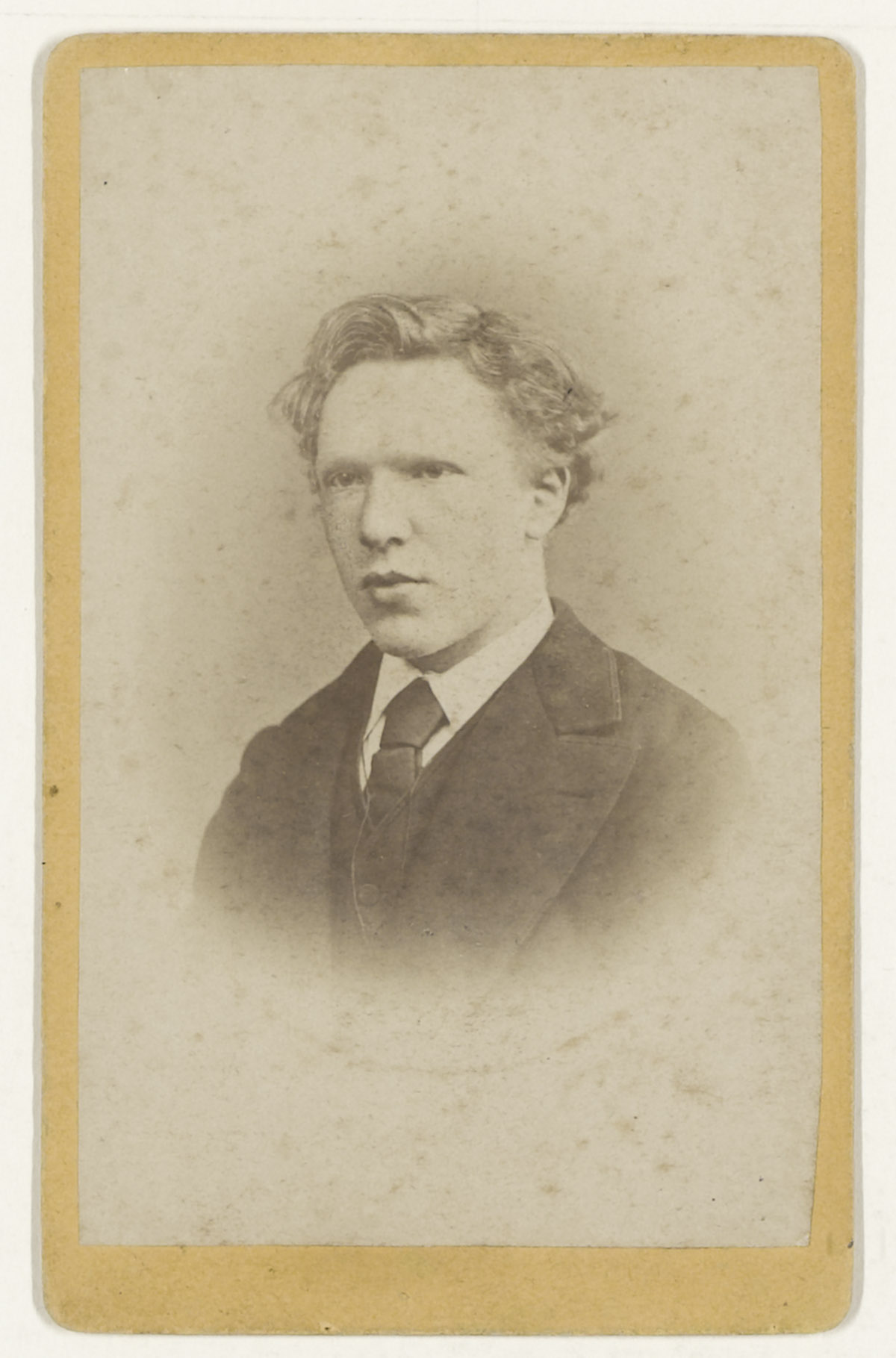
Vincent van Gogh in 1873.

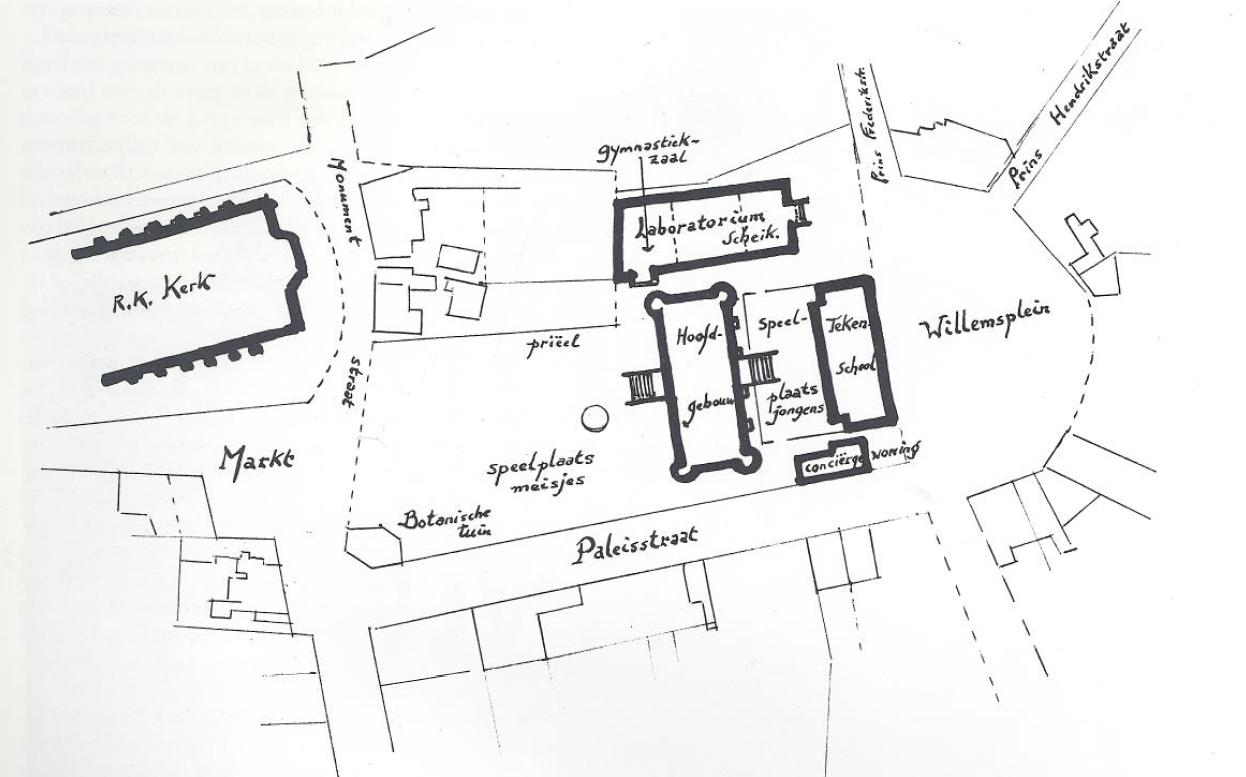
Survey of the Rijks-HBS Koning Willem II in 1866. Also the surrounding of the school is on the map, like the Saint Denis church. The buildings around the palace like the gym and the laboratory, which are both in one building, the art school and the caretaker's house were all demolished later.

=== Rijks-HBS ===
By the second half of the 19th century 28,000 people lived in Tilburg. A need was felt for a HBS, a then new type of high school for secular education. It was aimed at bourgeois pupils as preparation for 'higher' positions in society, better adapted to the economic demands of a rapidly changing society than the Latin school. It was meant for middle class youth who didn't need an academic education, but required a broad general knowledge to fulfil important positions in trade and industry.

=== Koning Willem II School ===
Although the city council wanted to provide this new type of education to the city's inhabitants, Tilburg did not receive state financial support for a school building. As the city couldn't afford a new building, it was suggested that King William II's palace be used for the new school. The palace was still owned by the Dutch royal family. On 30 November 1863 the city council sent a letter to the secretary of the royal family, requesting the palace's use as a school building. Authorisation came in 1864 and in 1865 alterations to the building began. On 9 April 1866 the palace was opened as a school, named: Koning Willem II (King William II). One of its first students would also become its most famous alumni: Dutch painter Vincent van Gogh, then 13 years old, attended classes in 1866 and left the school for unknown reasons in 1868. With an average rating of 7.36 (on a scale from 1 to 10) young Vincent was a mediocre student. His art teacher was the painter Constant Cornelis Huijsmans.

=== Controversial beginning and the continual growth ===
The first 25 years of the school’s existence were tough. There was a large turnover of staff and the number of students remained small. The lack of religious education caused a lot of criticism from the Roman Catholic clergy. Initially the school offered tuition to boys only; in 1894 the first girl was signed up – Maria Bes, daughter of the mathematics teacher. She passed her exams in 1899 and went to Delft to study engineering. She became one of the first female engineers in the Netherlands. In the 1920s electric light and central heating were installed in the building and the 50-year-old desks were replaced. In 1934 the school moved, for lack of space, to a new location at the Ringbaan Oost in Tilburg.

== City hall ==
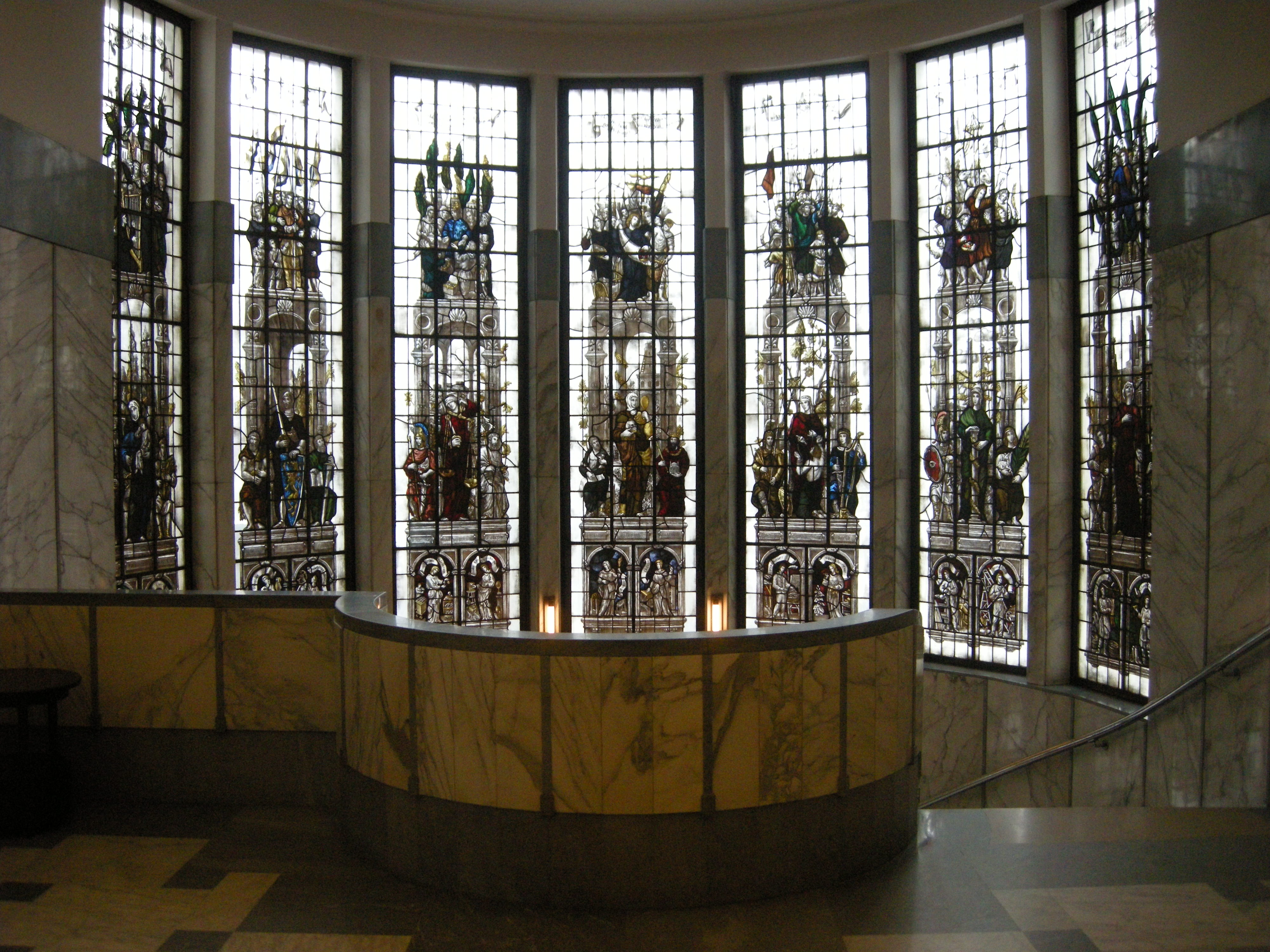
Stained glass windows in the half circular stairwell, made by Joep Nicolas.

=== Alteration of 1934–1936 ===
In 1934 the palace was 85 years old and for about 70 years it had functioned as a school. The building was totally decrepit and had to get renovated and altered. In 1931, when the building was still used as a school, the city council already considered using the palace as the new city hall. Oscar Leeuw, an architect from Nijmegen, was commissioned by Tilburg city council to alter the decrepit school into a representative Palace-Council House. Leeuw tried to restore the original character of the building. He brought back the long lost merlons and made the building more gothic than it ever was by replacing the square windows with lancet windows. The thin and slender towers near the entrance with the pinnacles on top were replaced by a middle risalit, with an entrance made in art deco style. On 1 August 1936 mayor Frans Vonk de Both reopened the reconstructed Palace-City Hall.

=== Interior ===
The alteration of the Palace-City Hall also changed its interior. The basement got a separate entrance at the east side. The piano nobile was completely rearranged. In the northern wing two wedding rooms were built. In the southern wing the mayor’s office was constructed.

At the east side, above the entrance to the basement, a half circular balcony was built. With a similar half circular extension, a new and elegant stairwell was made, which contains a broad marble spiral staircase. The circular extension have stained glass windows made by stained-glass artist Joep Nicolas. The scenes in the stained glass express the virtues of a number of administrators and figures from classical antiquity.

On the second floor three halls were built. One big wedding room in the north wing and a big hall for the city council itself, complete with a press gallery in the southern wing. A smaller room between the wedding room and the council chambers was made for the aldermen. On the lintel beam a fresco is made by Henri Sicking. It’s a symbolical representation of a prosperous future in an urban society of culture and economy. Expressed by a woman, flanked by a man and a woman, writing on a banner which has been draped over a book support with the Latin words: 'CVLTVRA' and 'OECONOMIA' on it. The latter is derived from the Ancient Greek οἰκονομία. Respectively these words mean: 'culture' and 'economy'.

== See also ==
- Willem II College
