= Nicole Maes =

Dutch politician (born 1974)

Member of the House of Representatives
- Incumbent
- Assumed office 25 February 2026

Personal details
- Born: 19 March 1974 (age 52) Netherlands
- Party: People's Party for Freedom and Democracy

Nicole Maes (born 19 March 1974) is a Dutch politician who has served as a member of the House of Representatives for the People's Party for Freedom and Democracy (VVD) since 2026. She was a candidate in the 2025 Dutch general election.

== See also ==
- List of members of the House of Representatives of the Netherlands, 2025–present
