= Jesse Six Dijkstra =

Dutch politician (born 1994)

Member of the House of Representatives
- In office 6 December 2023 – 11 November 2025

Personal details
- Born: 23 October 1994 (age 31) Dordrecht, Netherlands
- Party: New Social Contract
- Education: Utrecht University

Jesse Six Dijkstra (born 23 September 1994) is a Dutch politician who served on the House of Representatives between December 2023 and November 2025. He worked at the General Intelligence and Security Service (AIVD) prior to entering politics. A member of the New Social Contract (NSC) party, his focus was on digital affairs and national security. Responding to a personnel shortage in prisons, he worked with Joost Sneller (D66) and Derk Boswijk (CDA) on a bill to allow courts to impose house arrest and electronic ankle monitoring as an alternative to short prison sentences. They also argued that it would help lower the risk of repeat offenses. Six Dijkstra did not run for re-election in 2025, and his term ended on 11 November 2025.

== House committee assignments ==
- Committee for the Interior
- Building advice committee
- Committee for Justice and Security
- Committee for Digital Affairs

== Electoral history ==
Electoral history of Jesse Six Dijkstra
| Year | Body | Party | Pos. | Votes | Result | | Ref. |
| Year | Body | Party | Pos. | Votes | Party seats | Individual | Ref. |
|---|---|---|---|---|---|---|---|
| 2023 | House of Representatives | New Social Contract | 9 | 1,658 | 20 | Won | |

== See also ==
- List of members of the House of Representatives of the Netherlands, 2023–2025
