= Björn Schutz =

Dutch politician (born 1971)

Member of the House of Representatives
- Incumbent
- Assumed office 12 November 2025

Personal details
- Born: 12 November 1971 (age 54) Antwerp, Belgium
- Party: People's Party for Freedom and Democracy

Björn Aljosa Schutz (born 12 November 1971) is a Dutch politician for the People's Party for Freedom and Democracy (VVD). In the 2025 Dutch general election he was 22nd on the candidate list for the Dutch House of Representatives elections. He has been a member of the Provincial Council of Zeeland since March 2023. Schütz is from Oud-Vossemeer.

== See also ==
- List of members of the House of Representatives of the Netherlands, 2025–present
