= Hanneke van der Werf =

Member of the Dutch House of Representatives

- Van der Werf in 2026

Member of the House of Representatives
- Incumbent
- Assumed office 29 March 2024
- Preceded by: Marijke Synhaeve
- In office 31 March 2021 – 1 October 2023

Leader of the Democrats 66 in the Municipal Council of The Hague
- In office June 2018 – 15 April 2021
- Preceded by: Robert van Asten
- Succeeded by: Dennis Groenewold

Member of the Municipal Council of The Hague
- In office 17 April 2014 – 15 April 2021
- Preceded by: Marjolein de Jong
- Succeeded by: Marije Mostert

Personal details
- Born: Johanna Jantina van der Werf; 29 November 1984 (age 41) Hengelo, Netherlands
- Party: Democrats 66
- Children: 1
- Education: University of Groningen

Johanna Jantina "Hanneke" van der Werf (pronounced [ˈɦɑnəkə vɑn dər ˈʋɛr(ə)f]; born 29 November 1984) is a Dutch politician of the Democrats 66 (D66). She was elected to the House of Representatives in 2021. She previously held a seat in the municipal council of The Hague (2014–2021) and worked for the D66 caucus in the House of Representatives (2010–2018).

== Early life and career ==
Van der Werf was born in Hengelo, Overijssel. She lived in nearby Haaksbergen until she was two years old, when her family moved to the village of Rekken. She attended secondary school Het Assink in Haaksbergen and subsequently studied history and journalism at the University of Groningen. From 2008 to 2009, Van der Werf worked as an editor of Den Haag Vandaag at the political news department of NOS, after which she worked as a personal assistant to a member of parliament. Between 2010 and 2018, she worked as a press officer for the D66 caucus in the House of Representatives. She had joined the party in the former year.

== Municipal Council of The Hague ==
Van der Werf ran as a candidate in the 2014 municipal election in The Hague, appearing seventh on D66's party list. She did not win a seat, as two candidates lower on the list were elected with preferential votes. She received a temporary seat in April 2014, when one of D66's council members went on sick leave.

Her membership became permanent in June 2014, when another councillor left to become an alderwoman. She was voted chair of the presidium three years later. In 2017, the municipal executive approved a bill she had presented that introduced a six-and-a-half-week paid paternity leave for civil servants. Before, fathers could only take a thirteen-week half-paid parental leave.

Van der Werf was re-elected in 2018 as the second candidate on the party list. Her specialization within her party was security and integration. She succeeded Robert van Asten as D66 caucus leader in The Hague in June 2018, when Van Asten became an alderman in the new executive. In September 2018, Van der Werf stopped working for the D66 caucus in the House of Representatives to take a job at financial services company Aegon as a spokesperson for mortgages, damage and innovation.

As council member, she wanted The Hague to apply for a pilot to test the legal cultivation and distribution of cannabis, but it was not supported by enough parties. She also called for the municipality to do more to prevent female circumcisions. In 2019, the council passed a proposal by Van der Werf to investigate businesses for criminal activities in specific areas. The approach had already been tried in Amsterdam.

== House of Representatives ==
In 2020, it was announced that Van der Werf would run in the 2021 general election. She was the ninth candidate on the party list, six places below her initial third place on the draft version of the list. She was elected, receiving 13,935 preferential votes, and was sworn into the House of Representatives on 31 March. Van der Werf vacated her seat in The Hague council in April. In the House, her specializations were security, terrorism, sex crimes, drugs, asylum, prostitution, human trafficking, and migration. In November 2021, she pled for a central point to aid victims of sexual violence and child abuse. A motion led to an investigation into establishing such a point. An amendment by Van der Werf was later passed to make revenge porn a sex crime, having before been classified as a privacy infringement. In June 2023, she launched a manifesto against aggression and violence together with Joost Sneller (D66). They responded to a perceived hardening of society causing increased hate and aggression, targeting those who serve society in particular. The document called on society, employers, and the government to act, and it was signed by most parties in parliament as well as several professional associations and labor unions.

Van der Werf was appointed national campaign leader of D66 in May 2022 ahead of the 2023 provincial elections. She temporarily left the House of Representatives starting 2 October 2023 due to her parental leave. Van der Werf returned on 29 March 2024 following her re-election in November 2023, and her specialties changed to defense, security, sex crimes, digital affairs, pensions, and benefits. Along with Barbara Kathmann (Labour Party), she advocated for an age rating system for social media platforms to protect children against negative effects. Van der Werf later called for a full ban on social media use by those under the age of 15, enforced through an age verification system.

=== Committee assignments ===
==== 2021–2023 term ====
- Committee for Digital Affairs
- Committee for the Interior
- Committee for Justice and Security
- Delegation to Europol's Joint Parliamentary Scrutiny Group

==== 2023–present term ====
- Committee for Justice and Security
- Committee for Digital Affairs
- Committee for Defence

== Personal life ==
While a member of the House of Representatives, Van der Werf moved from The Hague to Voorburg. She married in 2022 in Rekken, five and a half years after the start of the relationship, and her husband is part of a band called Weekend Warriors. Their daughter was born in 2020.

== Electoral history ==
Electoral history of Hanneke van der Werf
Year	Body	Party	Pos.	Votes	Result		Ref.
Year	Body	Party	Pos.	Votes	Party seats	Individual	Ref.
2021	House of Representatives	Democrats 66	9	13,935	24	Won	
2023	House of Representatives	Democrats 66	8	9,840	9	Won	
2025	House of Representatives	Democrats 66	9	43,259	26	Won	
