= Tjeerd de Groot =

Dutch politician (born 1968)

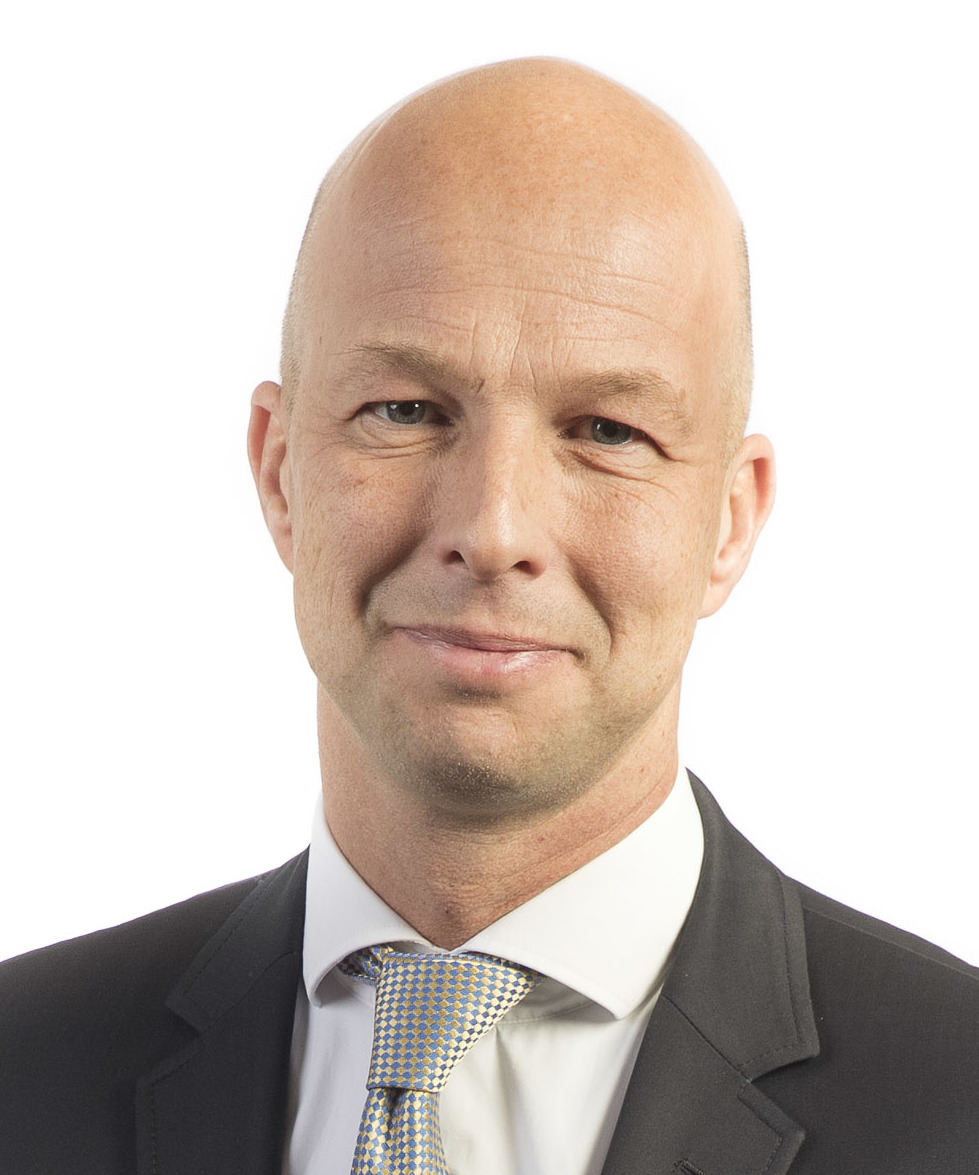
- De Groot in 2017

Member of the Dutch House of Representatives
- In office 12 December 2023 – 28 March 2024
- Preceded by: Ilana Rooderkerk
- Succeeded by: Ilana Rooderkerk
- In office 12 March 2017 – 5 December 2023

Personal details
- Born: Tjeerd Cornelis de Groot; 10 April 1968 (age 58) Haarlem, Netherlands
- Party: D66
- Education: Leiden University (PhD)
- Occupation: Politician

Tjeerd Cornelis de Groot (born 10 April 1968) is a Dutch politician for D66. He served as a member of the House of Representatives between March 2017 and March 2024. Starting in March 2021, he was responsible for the portfolios of agriculture, nature, fisheries, food, animal welfare, water and shipping.

== Early life and education ==
De Groot studied public administration at Leiden University. As a student assistant to Jouke de Vries, he and De Vries evaluated the General Inspection Service in 1990 in response to fishing fraud. In 1997 he obtained his PhD in Leiden on the 'EU negotiations on reforms of the Common Agricultural Policy'.

== Career ==
From 1997 De Groot made a career at the Ministry of Agriculture, Nature Management and Fisheries and was a policy officer, political advisor to Minister Laurens Jan Brinkhorst in 2000 and MT member of the International Affairs Directorate from 2002 to 2005. From 2005 to 2009, De Groot worked at the Dutch embassy in Berlin as an agricultural councilor. He subsequently served as deputy director of international affairs at the ministry until mid-2010. He was also a lobbyist for the Dutch Dairy Organization (NZO).

He was director of the NZO until he was installed as a member of the House of Representatives on 23 March 2017.

In September 2019, De Groot proposed halving the Dutch livestock population as a solution to the problems that arose after the Nitrogen Approach Program (PAS) was declared invalid. D66 stated that it wanted to "combat nitrogen emissions and make housing construction possible." These statements prompted a large protest by thousands of farmers on the Malieveld on 1 October 2019.

On 7 December 2022, De Groot was in the news because he called Ongehoord Nieuws reporter Jonathan Krispijn, who makes programs for the Dutch Public Broadcasting organization, a fascist. On 8 December 2022, De Groot took back his words in a message on X, then Twitter. He made no public apology.

He unsuccessfully ran for re-election in November 2023, and his term ended on 5 December. However, he was again sworn into the House on 12 December to temporarily replace Ilana Rooderkerk during her maternity leave. He served as D66's spokesperson for agriculture, nature, water, climate, and energy. Rooderkerk returned on 29 March 2024.

== Personal life ==
De Groot lives with his girlfriend and has children from a previous relationship. He can speak West Frisian.

== Electoral history ==
Electoral history of Tjeerd de Groot
Year	Body	Party	Pos.	Votes	Result		Ref.
Year	Body	Party	Pos.	Votes	Party seats	Individual	Ref.
2017	House of Representatives	Democrats 66	19	1,825	19	Won	
2021	House of Representatives	Democrats 66	8	4,856	24	Won	
2023	House of Representatives	Democrats 66	10	4,739	9	Lost (Note: De Groot was appointed to the body later during the term due to a vacancy.)	
