= Hilde Wendel =

Dutch politician (born 1996)

Member of the House of Representatives
- Incumbent
- Assumed office 12 November 2025

Personal details
- Born: 22 May 1996 (age 30) Drenthe, Netherlands
- Party: People's Party for Freedom and Democracy

Hilde Wendel (born 22 May 1996) is a Dutch politician for the People's Party for Freedom and Democracy (VVD). In 2025 she was 21st on the candidate list for the Dutch House of Representatives elections. She was previously chair of the JOVD. Wendel lives in Groningen and studied in Friesland.

== See also ==
- List of members of the House of Representatives of the Netherlands, 2025–present
