= Onderweg naar Morgen =

Dutch television soap opera

- Genre: Soap opera
- Based on: Ryan's Hope by: Claire Labine; Paul Avila Mayer
- Written by: Sander Offenberg; Rogier Proper; Marciel Witteman; Sabine van den Eynden
- Directed by: Berry van Galen; Steven de Jong; Hans Walther; Joris van den Berg
- Country of origin: Netherlands
- Original language: Dutch
- No. of seasons: 17
- No. of episodes: 3225

Production
- Executive producers: Hans Scheepmaker; Helen de Gans; Frank Schoutens; Bart Oudshoorn
- Producers: Willem Zijlstra; Peter Römer
- Production companies: Endemol; TROS/Veronica (1994-1995); HMG/RTL Nederland (1995-2005); BNN (2006-2010)

Original release
- Network: Nederland 2 (1994-1995, 2005-2006); Veronica (1995-2001); Yorin (2001-2005); Nederland 3 (2006-2010)
- Release: 3 January 1994 – 14 May 2010

Related
- Ryan's Hope

Onderweg naar Morgen (English: On the way to Tomorrow) is a Dutch television soap opera based on Ryan's Hope. The series was aired by Veronica between 1994 and 2001, including co-broadcasting with TROS in 1994 and 1995. When Veronica announced that it would leave the joint venture with Holland Media Groep, RTL was forced to rebrand the station as Yorin, which continued to broadcast the series between 2001 and 2005. In 2005 the series was sold to BNN, which continued to air it until 2010 when the series ended. Since 2012, the series has aired in syndication on NPO 1 Extra.

== Cast ==
=== A ===
Actor	Personage	Time
Evrim Akyigit	Elif Özal (#2)	2005-2007
Juliette van Ardenne	Marjet Bartels	2008
Vivienne van den Assem	Lizzy Vehmeijer (#1)	2001-2003

=== B ===
Actor	Personage	Time
Wim Bax	Serge van Mieghem	1998-2001, 2003
Bettina Berger	Renée Couwenberg	1994-2005
Rosita Boedhoe	Ruby Moret	1998-1999
Herman Boerman	Frank Reitsema (#1)	1994-2000
Casper van Bohemen	Rutger Helligers (#2)	1996-1997
Annelieke Bouwers	Sanne Klein	2004-2010
Eric Bouwman	Tonnie de Vries	2004-2008
Tamara Brinkman	Babette Couwenberg	1997-2001, 2003
Wendy Brouwer	Margot Reitsema (#2)	1997-2003
Michaël van Buuren	Jurriaan van Elst	1994-1995

=== C ===
Actor	Personage	Time
Yolanthe Cabau van Kasbergen	Julia Branca	2005-2008
Hicham Chairi Slaimani	Yousef El-Bassity	2005-2010
Iwana Chronis	Reina de Zeeuw (#2)	1995-1997
Sarah Chronis	Eva Persijn	2006-2009
Simone Cobben	Tara van Walsum (#2)	2004-2006

=== D ===
Actor	Personage	Time
Margot van Doorn	Merel Mascini	1996, 1997-1999
Eva Duijvestein	Reina de Zeeuw (#1)	1994-1995
Marina Duvekot	Margot Reitsema (#1)	1994-1995

=== E ===
Actor	Personage	Time
Natalie Edwardes	Tess Lindeman	2008-2010
Corinne van Egeraat	Julia Fontaine	1996-1997
Gaston van Erven	Jan Reitsema	1994-1995

=== F ===
Actor	Personage	Time
Mimi Ferrer	Aïsha Amal	1997-2001, 2003
Roel Fooy	Sander Overbeeke	1994-1996
Sander Foppele	Daan Starrenburg (#2)	2000-2003, 2004, 2005-2008

=== G ===
Actor	Personage	Time
Peter de Gelder	Bennie Carstens	1994, 1995
Lauretta Gerards	Malú Branca	2006-2010

=== H ===
Actor	Personage	Time
Robert de la Haye	Niels Richter	2003-2007, 2008
Sander de Heer	Marnix Klein	2004-2010
Judith Hees	Elisabeth Ansingh	1994

=== I ===
Actor	Personage	Time
Youssef Idilbi	Sid Porter	2002-2003
Tim Immers	Ravi Wertheimer (#1)	1997-2001

=== J ===
Actor	Personage	Time
Frits Jansma	JP	1994-2010
Berber Esha Janssen	Donna Brinkman	2010
Tanja Jess	Marjolijn Curie	2004-2005
Chris Jolles	Luciel Starrenburg	2000-2002, 2003
Jop Joris	Joost van Walsum	2002-2008
Katarina Justic	Shirina Delic	2004-2010

=== K ===
Actor	Personage	Time
Petra Kagchelland	Iris Overbeek	2004-2006, 2007, 2008
Antonie Kamerling	Ron Raven	2005
Seth Kamphuijs	Ticho Steiner	1999-2000
Levi van Kempen	Junior Couwenberg	2005-2010
Marjolein Keuning	Joyce Couwenberg (#1)	1994-1996
Anouck Klomp	Tara van Walsum (#1)	2003-2004
Sabine Koning	Yvonne Hulst	2004-2005
Gürkan Küçüksentürk	Ilyas Cabar	2004-2010

=== L ===
Actor	Personage	Time
Sebastiaan Labrie	Olaf Zwart	2000-2002
Mick de Lint	Jasper Klein	2009-2010

=== M ===
Actor	Personage	Time
Hidde Maas	Arthur van Walsum	2003-2004
Bo Maerten	Kim Klein	2008-2010
Niels Megens	Daan Starrenburg (#1)	2000
Manouk van der Meulen	Daphne Simons	1994-1996, 1997-1998, 2001–2002, 2004
Tom Mickers	Carlo Breidenbach	2003-2004
Marjena Moll	Anna Persijn	2006-2008
Melline Mollerus	Lisette Krol	1994-2005
Hero Muller	Cor de Zeeuw	1994-1998

=== N ===
Actor	Personage	Time
André Arend van Noord	Pim Reitsema (#2)	2001

=== O ===
Actor	Personage	Time
Jackie van Oppen	Suzanne van Wetering	1994-1995, 1996
Dennis Overeem	Bram de Boei	2001-2004

=== P ===
Actor	Personage	Time
Fem Petraeus	Ariël Visser	2002-2004
Kim Pieters	Claire Simons	2001-2005
Nikkie Plessen	Lizzy Vehmeijer (#2)	2003-2005
Patty Pontier	Els Stam	1994-1995

=== R ===
Actor	Personage	Time
Ben Ramakers	Miguel Zwart	1999-2000
Kenan Raven	Duuk de Ruyg	2001-2004
Job Redelaar	Pim Reitsema (#1)	1994-1997, 2001
Miryanna van Reeden	Maus Dullaert	2009-2010
Afke Reijenga	Lotus Verburg	1998-1999
Aram van de Rest	Chris Vroman	2004-2008
René Retèl	Steven Ansingh	1994
Pauline van Rhenen	Aafke Reitsema	1994-2004
Franky Ribbens	Melle Hartman	1996-1997
Robin Rienstra	Hugo van Walsum	2002-2005
Frank Rigter	Frank Reitsema (#2)	2000-2001
Ilana Rooderkerk	Esmée Klein	2005-2010
Monique Rosier	Annemarie de Graaf	2005-2007

=== S ===
Actor	Personage	Time
Jörgen Scholtens	Sytze Eyzinga	2008-2010
Martin Schwab	Gyman Rhemrev	1994-1996
Jasmine Sendar	Kyra Isarin	2001-2009
Joep Sertons	Paul de Ridder	1995-1998
Karina Smulders	Lotje Konings	1996-1998, 1999
Anna Speller	Jacqueline Brunel (#2)	2010

=== T ===
Actor	Personage	Time
Dirk Taat	Alex Luzack	2008-2010
Pamela Teves	Bettina Wertheimer (#1)	1994-2010
Dieter Troubleyn	Ravi Wertheimer (#2)	2007-2008

=== V ===
Actor	Personage	Time
Yvonne Valkenburg	Irene de Vries	1994-1996
Apolonia van Veen	Wanda Zevenster	1995-1997
Annemieke Verdoorn	Joyce Couwenberg (#2)	1996-2008
Jos Verest	Rutger Helligers (#1)	1996
Sascha Visser	Sam Massini	2006-2008
Dominique van Vliet	Ellen Evenhuis	1995-2004, 2008
Pim Vosmaer	Bob Simons	1994-1997
Dolf de Vries	Ed Couwenberg	1994-1999
Jop de Vries	Victor Couwenberg	1994-2003, 2005

=== W ===
Actor	Personage	Time
Juan Wells	Bento do Carmo	1999-2001
Monique van der Werff	Suzy de Ruyg	2002-2003
Beppie van Wijk	Lara Evenhuis	2000-2001
John Williams	Maurice Seegers	2001-2002, 2003
Bob Wind	Maarten Luzack	2008-2010
Miljuschka Witzenhausen	Jacqueline Brunel (#1)	2008-2010

=== Z ===
Actor	Personage	Time
Chris Zegers	Sasza Nagy	1997-1999
Tim Zweije	Jannes Reitsema (#2)	2001-2002
