= Arend Kisteman =

Dutch politician (born 1984)

Member of the House of Representatives
- Incumbent
- Assumed office 6 December 2023

Personal details
- Born: 13 May 1984 (age 41) Ede, Netherlands
- Party: VVD
- Occupation: Politician; baker; lobbyist

Arend Kisteman (born 13 May 1984) is a Dutch politician of the conservative-liberal People's Party for Freedom and Democracy (VVD), who has served as a member of the House of Representatives since December 2024.

== Biography ==
Kisteman grew up in Zwolle. His mother was a stay-at-home parent, and his father worked as an internal auditor at a bank. The family was part of the Reformed Churches (Liberated), and Kisteman later became a member of the Dutch Reformed Churches.

He founded a bakery in Zwolle called De Stadsbakker. In addition, he became chairperson of the Netherlands Bakery and Patisserie Entrepreneurs Association (NBOV).

Kisteman has told that he became involved in politics when discussing compensation schemes for bakeries during the 2021–23 energy crisis. He had been a supporter of the VVD since he started running his bakery, having previously voted for the Christian Union. Kisteman ran for the House of Representatives as the VVD's 23rd candidate in November 2023, and he was elected. He serves as the parliamentary group's spokesperson on small and medium-sized enterprises, telecommunications, labor conditions, and unemployment benefits. The latter two subjects of his portfolio were replaced by primary and secondary education and lifelong learning following the swearing in of the Schoof cabinet. To promote reading among children, he proposed with Ilana Rooderkerk (D66) to automatically enroll newborns in local libraries.

=== House committee assignments ===
- Petitions committee
- Committee for Economic Affairs
- Committee for Social Affairs and Employment
- Committee for Climate Policy and Green Growth

== Personal life ==
As of 2024, Kisteman had a wife and lived in Zwolle.

== Electoral history ==
Electoral history of Arend Kisteman
Year	Body	Party	Pos.	Votes	Result		Ref.
Year	Body	Party	Pos.	Votes	Party seats	Individual	Ref.
2023	House of Representatives	VVD	23	1,561	24	Won	
2025	House of Representatives	VVD	19	1,910	22	Won	
