= Derk Boswijk =

Dutch politician (born 1989)

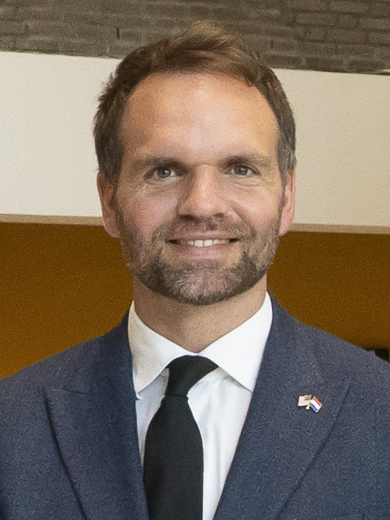
- Boswijk in 2025

Member of the House of Representatives
- Incumbent
- Assumed office 31 March 2021

Member of the States of Utrecht
- In office 26 March 2015 – 14 April 2021
- Succeeded by: Gerdien Bikker

Personal details
- Born: Derk Geertsz Boswijk; 8 April 1989 (age 37) Woerden, Netherlands
- Party: Christian Democratic Appeal
- Spouse: Wilma Boswijk-Kroon (m. 2013)
- Children: 3
- Education: ROC ASA; Amsterdam University of Applied Sciences; University of Applied Sciences Utrecht; Saxion University of Applied Sciences
- Website: derkboswijk.com

Derk Geertsz Boswijk (born 8 April 1989) is a Dutch politician serving as a member of the House of Representatives since the 2021 general election. A member of the Christian Democratic Appeal (CDA), he previously held a seat in the States of Utrecht from 2015 to 2021 and chaired his party's caucus during the last two of those years.

== Early life and education ==
Boswijk was born in 1989 in the Utrecht city Woerden. His father worked as manager of a packaging materials factory. He attended the high school Driestar College in Gouda at vmbo level between 2001 and 2005 and was subsequently trained in architectural engineering at the mbo school ROC ASA in Utrecht until 2009. He would later during his career also obtain an bachelor's degree in Industrial Engineering & Management from Amsterdam University of Applied Sciences and a master's degree in Urban and Area Development from HU University of Applied Sciences Utrecht and Saxion University of Applied Sciences.

== Career ==
While studying in Utrecht in 2006, Boswijk founded Ingenieursbureau Bosons, a business specialized in permits and architectural drawings. At the time, he was a supporter of the populist Party for Freedom. Besides, Boswijk wrote a book called Zoon van een emigrant (Son of an emigrant) based on letters by his great-grandfather Cornelis Treur, who left the Netherlands in 1913 to live in United States. It came out in 2014. A historical novel written by Boswijk based on the same letters was released under the name Waarom ik vertrok (Why I left) in 2017.

He participated in the 2015 provincial election in Utrecht as the CDA's sixth candidate and was elected to the States of Utrecht, where he focussed on the environment, mobility, and the economy. Boswijk kept working at Bosons until 2016, when he left to work as property developer at real estate investment firm Heyen Beheer. In the states-provincial, Boswijk tried to improve internet connections in rural areas, and he called for the province to do more to support family businesses. Boswijk was re-elected in the 2019 election as his party's lead candidate and became caucus leader. He also became a reserve officer (second lieutenant) in the Royal Netherlands Army the following year.

== House of Representatives ==
=== First term ===
Boswijk was elected member of parliament in the March 2021 general election, being placed 14th on the CDA's party list. He received 1,603 preference votes after a campaign in which he talked about what he perceived as a lack of attention by the House of Representatives for people with a vocational education. Boswijk left Heyen Beheer, and he vacated his seat in the States of Utrecht the following month. In the House of Representatives, he became a member of the Committee for Agriculture, Nature and Food Quality; the Committee for Defence; Committee for Economic Affairs and Climate Policy; the Committee for European Affairs; the Committee for Foreign Affairs; the Committee for Infrastructure and Water Management; the contact group United States (vice chair); and the Dutch parliamentary delegation to the NATO Assembly. His specialties were initially agriculture and defence, but they changed to foreign affairs, defence, climate, and energy near the end of his first term.

While Boswijk served as the CDA's agricultural spokesperson in the House in July 2021, the party presented its new agricultural vision, which was characterized as a break from its past. It called shrinking the number of farm animals necessary in order to halve reactive nitrogen emissions by 2030 but said it was not a goal in itself. The CDA's plans also called for between €1.5 billion and €2 billion in funds per year to, among other things, assist farmers in developing and maintaining natural areas, which would allow them to make a living with fewer farm animals. To achieve this goal, he proposed the introduction of a new type of land in between agricultural and natural land he dubbed landschapsgrond (landscape land), which later became part of the coalition agreement of the fourth Rutte cabinet. Boswijk defended his plans during a speech at a farmers' protest the day after he had announced them. Boswijk later offered a five-step plan to nature and nitrogen policy minister Christianne van der Wal, in which he outlined a localized approach as opposed to a generic one to reduce reactive nitrogen emission. He also complained that the cabinet was mostly focused on cutting agricultural emissions while not creating as detailed plans for other sectors. In June 2022, Boswijk defied the advice of the counter-terrorism unit NCTV to not attend a farmer's protest in Stroe. Following a visit from a disgruntled farmer at his home later that month while his family was there, he announced that he would stay at home with his family for some days. Boswijk proposed in late 2022 that dairy companies should be forced to use at least a certain percentage of sustainable milk in their products. This would help the earning power of sustainable dairy farmers.

When Kabul was captured by the Taliban in August 2021, he called on the Dutch government to evacuate all Afghans who had assisted the Dutch army in the War in Afghanistan and were being threatened by the Taliban. He also had contact with people in Afghanistan in order to help them get evacuated. He criticized the government's evacuation operation, describing it as a "clusterfuck", and he successfully advocated an external investigation into the matter. In a profile in de Volkskrant, Boswijk was called an activist member of parliament for being critical of the governing coalition to which his party belonged, and he was therefore compared to Pieter Omtzigt, who had played a prominent role in uncovering the childcare benefits scandal and who had left the CDA earlier that year. During the Russian invasion of Ukraine, he pled for a reinstatement of conscription in order to relieve the personnel shortage of the Netherlands Armed Forces. He was in favor of a voluntary system similar to that of Sweden, where only motivated citizens are invited.

=== Campaign leader and re-election ===
Boswijk was the CDA's national campaign leader for the 2022 municipal elections as well as the lijstduwer in his home municipality of Stichtse Vecht in those elections. He again ran the CDA's national campaign for the 2023 provincial elections. When his party received 6.6% of the vote – compared to 11.1% four years earlier – Boswijk called the results rubbish and said that the story of the CDA was not getting across. The collapse of the fourth Rutte cabinet in July 2023 triggered a November snap election. Party leader Wopke Hoekstra announced he would no longer be the CDA's lead candidate, and Boswijk applied to succeed him. Boswijk endorsed Henri Bontenbal, when the board nominated him as the new party leader. Boswijk was re-elected after he was placed third on the party list, while his specialties changed to foreign affairs, foreign trade, development cooperation, justice, security, and defence. Responding to a personnel shortage in prisons, he worked with Jesse Six Dijkstra (NSC) and Joost Sneller (D66) on a bill to allow courts to impose house arrest and electronic ankle monitoring as an alternative to short prison sentences. They also argued that it would help lower the risk of repeat offenses.

== Personal life ==
Boswijk married Wilma Kroon in 2013, and they have three daughters. He resides in the village of Kockengen in the province Utrecht, having lived in nearby Wilnis before, and he is a member of the Reformed Association in the Protestant Church in the Netherlands. Boswijk tried to climb Mont Blanc in 2016 to raise money for the hearing loss foundation Hear the World, as his eldest daughter was born with the condition. He did not reach the summit but did manage to raise €8,000.

== Electoral history ==
Electoral history of Derk Boswijk
| Year | Body | Party | Pos. | Votes | Result | | Ref. |
| Year | Body | Party | Pos. | Votes | Party seats | Individual | Ref. |
|---|---|---|---|---|---|---|---|
| 2021 | House of Representatives | Christian Democratic Appeal | 14 | 1,603 | 15 | Won | |
| 2023 | House of Representatives | Christian Democratic Appeal | 3 | 3,217 | 5 | Won | |
| 2025 | House of Representatives | Christian Democratic Appeal | 3 | 7,157 | 18 | Won | |

== Bibliography ==
- 2014 – Zoon van een emigrant; English translation: Son of an Immigrant
- 2017 – Waarom ik vertrok (Why I left)
- 2020 – Theodore Roosevelt: De progressieve populist (Theodore Roosevelt: The progressive populist)
- 2022 – Honger & oorlog: Waarom oneliners geen oplossingen bieden voor complexe problemen (Hunger & war: Why one-liners will not solve complex issues)
