= Mahjoub Mathlouti =

Dutch politician (born 1988)

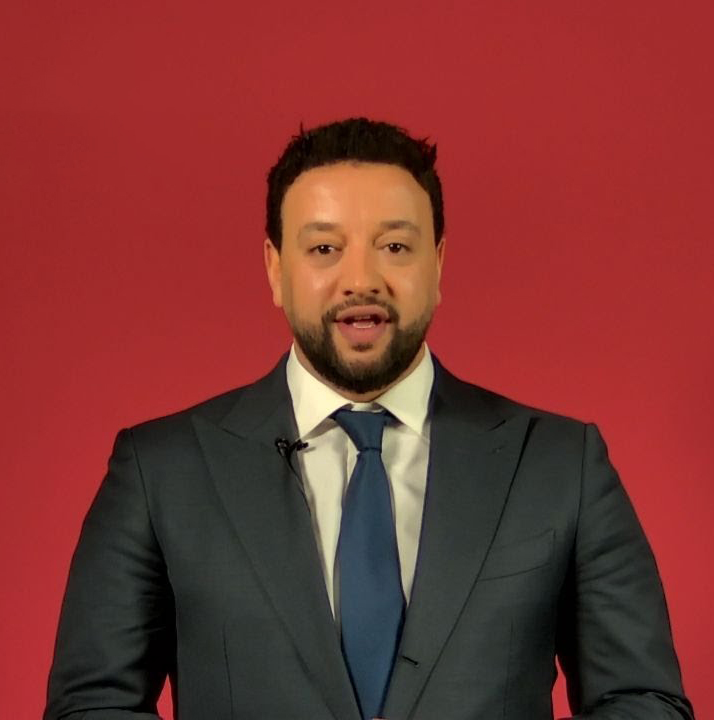
- Mathlouti in 2021

Member of the House of Representatives
- Incumbent
- Assumed office 25 February 2026
- Preceded by: Nathalie van Berkel

Personal details
- Born: 13 April 1988 (age 38)
- Party: Democrats 66

Mahjoub Mathlouti (born 13 April 1988) is a Tunisian-born Dutch politician serving as a member of the House of Representatives since 2026. From 2024 to 2026, he served as advisor to the Ministry of Justice and Security. From 2022 to 2024, he served as advisor to the Ministry of Agriculture, Nature and Food Quality.
