= Fatimazhra Belhirch =

Dutch politician (born 1975)

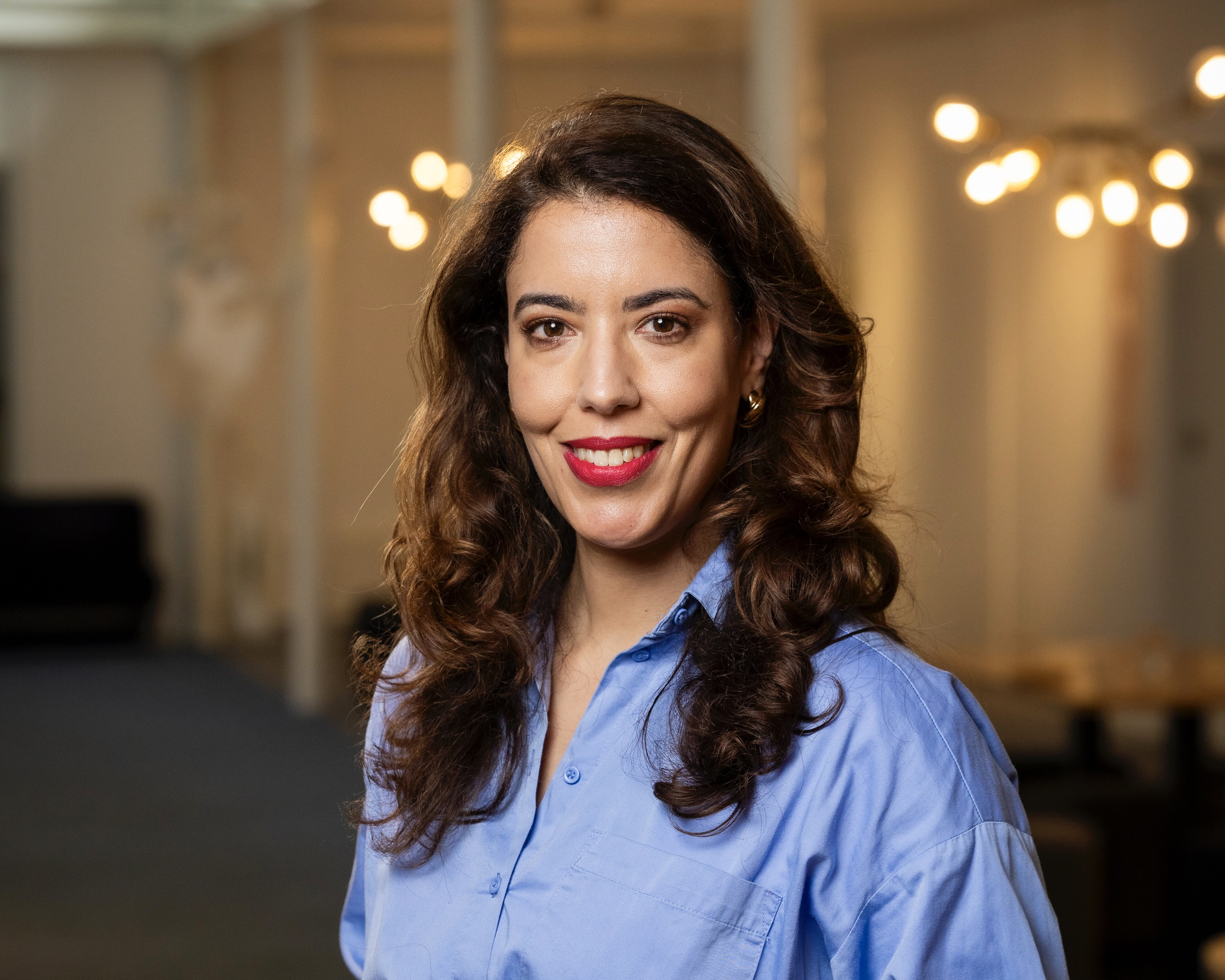
- Belhrich (2026)

Member of the House of Representatives
- Incumbent
- Assumed office 12 November 2025

Member of the Senate
- In office 13 June 2023 – 10 November 2025
- Succeeded by: Antoon Kanis

Personal details
- Born: 9 October 1975 (age 51) Rotterdam, Netherlands
- Party: Democrats 66
- Education: Erasmus University Rotterdam; University of Amsterdam
- Occupation: Lawyer • Politician

Fatimazhra Belhirch (born Rotterdam, 9 October 1975) is a Dutch politician initially serving as a member of the Senate since 2023. and switched in 2025 to House of Representatives (Netherlands) with responsibility for Ministry of Defence (Netherlands), Monarchy of the Netherlands and General Affairs of the Netherlands

Before entering Public service, she was active in legal services at De Brauw Blackstone Westbroek, DAS Rechtsbijstand and Bazar. In 2006, she became a civil servant with Department of foreign affairs with focus on Foreign trade and Development Cooperation until 2020. From 2022 to 2024, she served as director of the Stichting voor Vluchteling-Studenten UAF.

She is an acting politician for Democrats 66 and appointed as vice-president for Alliance of Liberals and Democrats for Europe Party since july 2026.
