= Ilana Rooderkerk =

Dutch actress and politician (born 1987)

- Rooderkerk in 2026

Member of the House of Representatives
- Incumbent
- Assumed office 29 March 2024
- Preceded by: Tjeerd de Groot
- In office 6 December 2023 – 7 December 2023
- Succeeded by: Tjeerd de Groot

Municipal councillor of Amsterdam
- In office March 2018 – 3 October 2023

Personal details
- Born: Ilana Rooderkerk; 4 May 1987 (age 39) Leiderdorp, Netherlands
- Party: Democrats 66
- Education: University of Amsterdam (BSc, MSc)

Ilana Rooderkerk (pronounced [iˈlaːnaː ˈroːdərkɛr(ə)k]; born 4 May 1987) is a Dutch actress, political scientist and politician of the Democrats 66 (D66), who has served as a member of the House of Representatives since 2023. She previously held a seat in the municipal council of Amsterdam from 2018 to 2023. As an actress, Rooderkerk portrayed the character of Esmée Klein in the soap opera Onderweg naar Morgen from 2005 to 2010.

== Biography ==
Rooderkerk was born in Leiderdorp, Netherlands. Upon completing her secondary education in 2005, she was cast for the role of Esmée Klein in the soap opera Onderweg naar Morgen, broadcast by BNN. Following the cancellation of the series in 2010, Rooderkerk studied international relations at the University of Amsterdam, obtaining a master's degree in 2014.

Between 2014 and 2021, Rooderkerk worked as a civil servant at the Ministry of Education, Culture and Science and Ministry of Infrastructure and Water Management. She won a seat in the municipal council of Amsterdam in the 2018 municipal election, and was re-elected in the 2022 municipal election. On 22 November 2023, she ran in the 2023 general election as the sixth candidate on the D66 list, and was elected into the House of Representatives. She was installed as MP on 6 December 2023, but she temporarily left the House due to her parental leave days later. Rooderkerk was replaced by Tjeerd de Groot, and she returned on 29 March 2024. Rooderkerk became D66's spokesperson for primary and secondary education, emancipation, art, culture, climate, energy, and mining. To promote reading among children, she proposed with Arend Kisteman (VVD) to automatically enroll newborns in local libraries.

=== House committee assignments ===
- Committee for Education, Culture and Science
- Committee for Economic Affairs
- Committee for Infrastructure and Water Management
- Committee for Climate Policy and Green Growth

== Electoral history ==
Electoral history of Ilana Rooderkerk
Year	Body	Party	Pos.	Votes	Result		Ref.
Year	Body	Party	Pos.	Votes	Party seats	Individual	Ref.
2023	House of Representatives	Democrats 66	6	12,560	9	Won	
2025	House of Representatives	Democrats 66	13	16,299	26	Won	

== Filmography ==
=== TV series ===
- Onderweg naar Morgen (2005–2010), Esmée Klein – 362 episodes
- De Meisjes van Thijs (2010), Amber – 1 episode

== See also ==
- Ilana Rooderkerk at IMDb
