= Willem II College =

School in Tilburg, Netherlands

Coordinates: 51.5413°N 5.0845°E

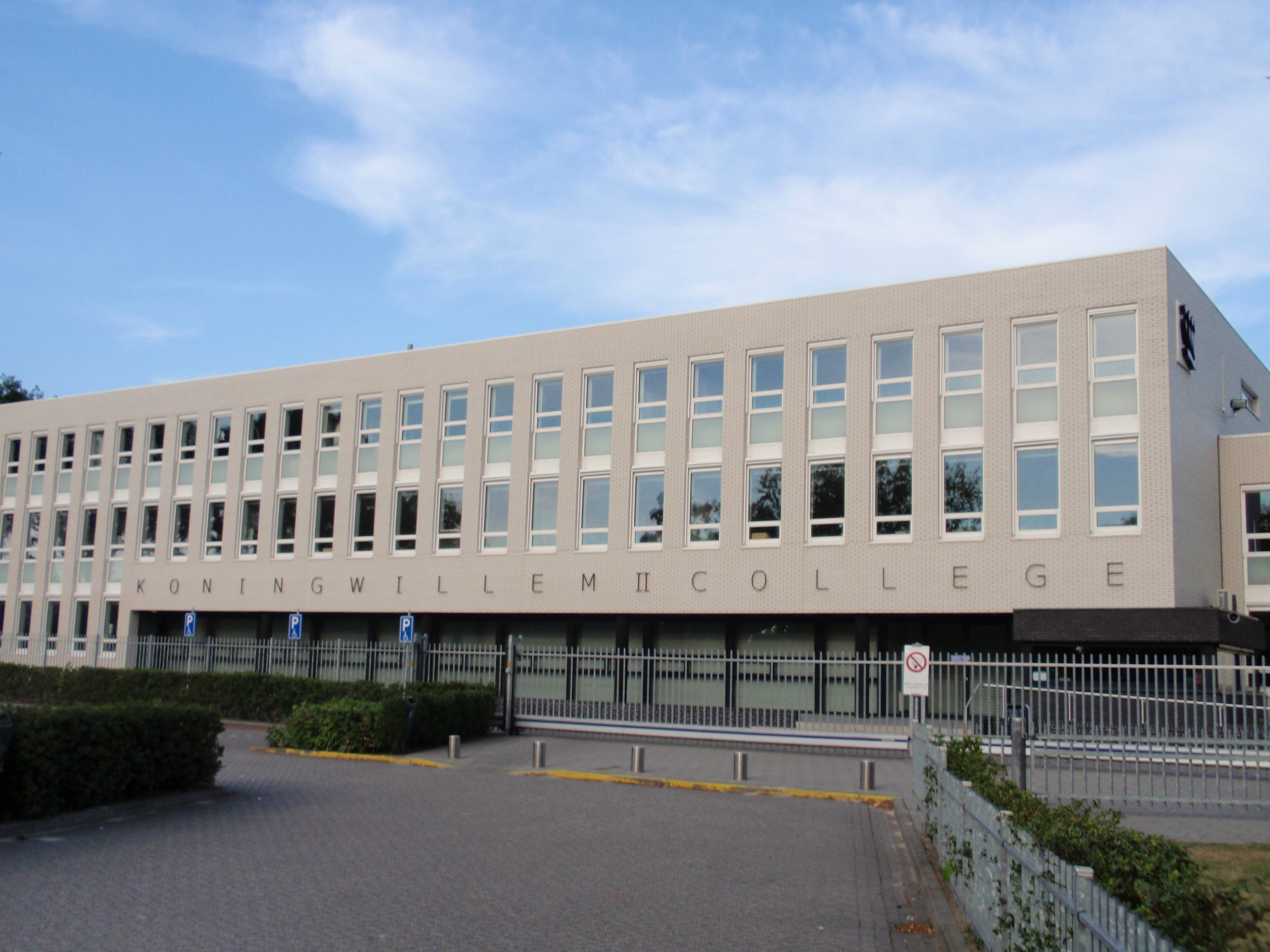
Willem II College

Koning Willem II College is a school in Tilburg in the Netherlands. It was established in 1866 and is named after King Willem II. The school was founded in the former royal palace in Tilburg, the present City Hall, of which the construction was commissioned by King William II himself. In 1934 the school moved from the former palace to the new location a new and much bigger building at the Ringbaan Oost in Tilburg. In 1971 the school moved to its present location on the Tatraweg.

The school is divided over seven buildings of varying size:

- The A-building contains the school's four gyms.
- The B-building is the school's main building. It has three floors and is one of the oldest buildings.
- The C-building has only a few classrooms and is located on the ground floor.
- The D-building like the B-building is one of the oldest buildings, but has only two floors.
- The E-building (one floor) and F-building (two floors) were not part of the original school and were built later with a more modern decoration. The main subjects taught here are the sciences biology, chemistry, and physics.
- The G-building is the smallest of all of the buildings, and has only one big room.

The school offers vmbo, havo or vwo (atheneum and gymnasium). The school is unique in offering students two alternative streams: the muzische afdeling (musical department) or a top-sport afdeling (top-sports department) for the first three years of their education, after which they may continue at the vmbo, havo or vwo.

== Vincent van Gogh ==
In 1866, the school welcomed of its most remarkable students and certainly its most famous: Vincent van Gogh. He left the school halfway during his second year, for unknown reasons. His parents still lived in Zundert and Vincent lived in one of the houses at the St. Annaplein in Tilburg, not far from the school. The oldest school photograph in the files of the school, a typical class photograph, is a famous photo of Van Gogh. It is said that his art teacher, Constant Cornelis Huijsmans, has had a strong influence of Gogh's early style.
