= Marijke Synhaeve =

Dutch politician (born 1989)

- Synhaeve in 2026

Member of the House of Representatives
- Incumbent
- Assumed office 12 November 2025
- In office 12 December 2023 – 28 March 2024
- Preceded by: Hanneke van der Werf
- Succeeded by: Hanneke van der Werf

Personal details
- Born: 5 November 1989 (age 36) Kortrijk, Belgium
- Citizenship: Belgium; Netherlands
- Party: Democrats 66

Marijke Synhaeve (pronounced [maːˈrɛikə ˈsɛinɦaːvə]; born 5 November 1989) is a Belgian-Dutch politician of the Democrats 66 (D66), who served as a temporary member of the House of Representatives from 12 December 2023 and 28 March 2024. She replaced Hanneke van der Werf during her maternity leave. Synhaeve served as her party's spokesperson for long-term care, child protection, poverty, labor force participation, pensions, and benefits.

In January 2026 she became a victim of pornographic deepfake videos.

== Electoral history ==
Electoral history of Marijke Synhaeve
Year	Body	Party	Pos.	Votes	Result		Ref.
Year	Body	Party	Pos.	Votes	Party seats	Individual	Ref.
2023	House of Representatives	Democrats 66	11	11,066	9	Lost (Note: Synhaeve was appointed to the body later during the term due to a vacancy.)	
2025	House of Representatives	Democrats 66	12	16,499	26	Won	
