= Nathalie van Berkel =

Dutch politician (born 1982)

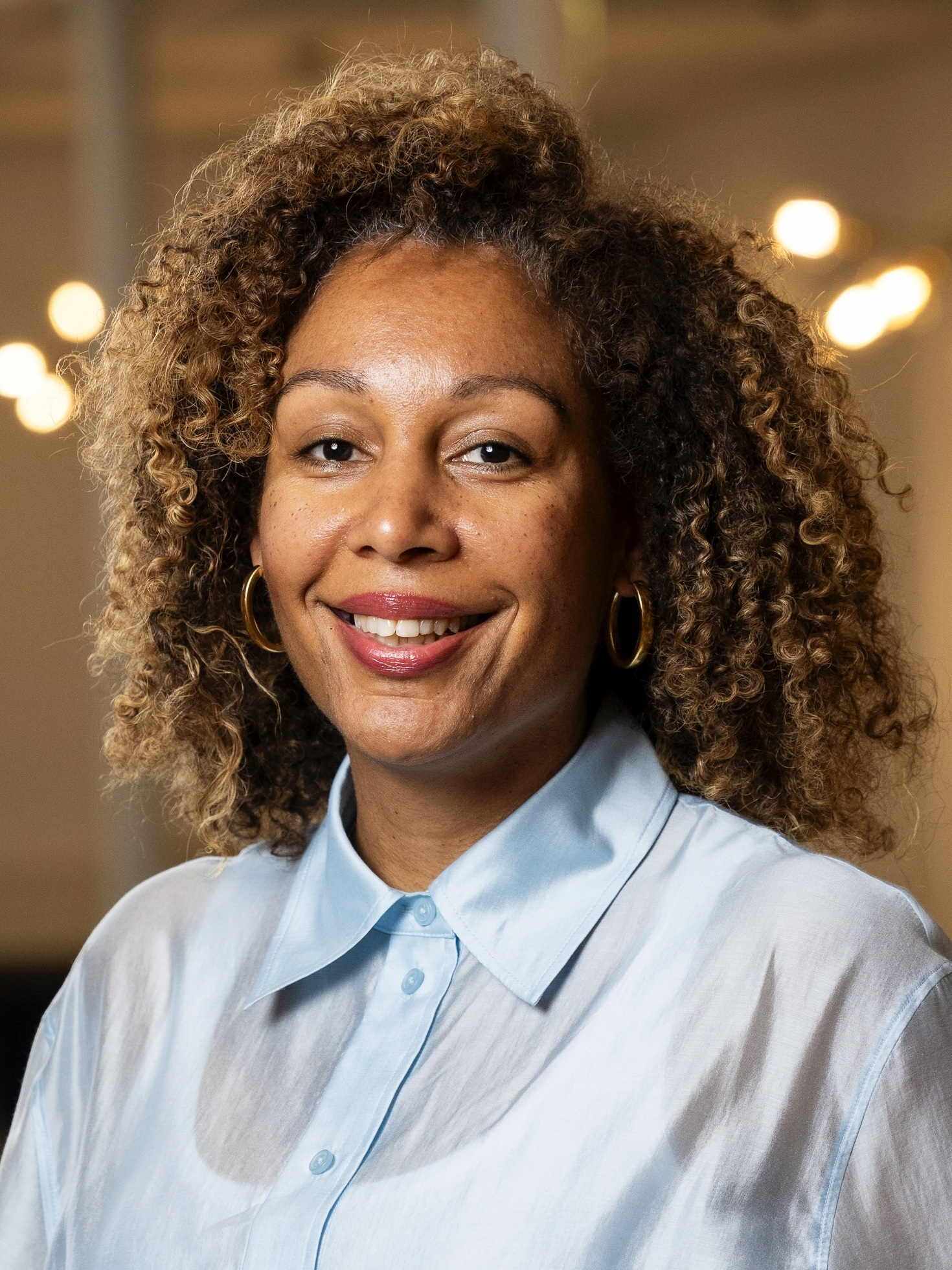
- Van Berkel in 2026

Member of the House of Representatives
- In office 12 November 2025 – 17 February 2026
- Succeeded by: Mahjoub Mathlouti

Personal details
- Born: Nathalie van Berkel; 25 August 1982 (age 44) Tegelen, Netherlands
- Party: Democrats 66
- Occupation: Politician; civil servant; executive

Nathalie van Berkel (born 25 August 1982) is a Dutch civil servant, executive and former politician of the Democrats 66 (D66). In the 2025 general election, she was elected to the House of Representatives. She was previously a member of the executive board of the Employee Insurance Agency (UWV).

== Early life and education ==
Van Berkel was born on 25 August 1982 in Tegelen, Limburg. She completed her secondary education with a HAVO diploma and went on to obtain her propaedeutic diploma in public administration at The Hague University of Applied Sciences. She dropped out of the programme after the first year.

== Career ==
=== Civil service career ===
Van Berkel began her career working for the municipalities of Rotterdam and Amsterdam. From 2019 to 2025, she served on the executive board of the Employee Insurance Agency (UWV). In 2021, she also became the chairperson of the Network of Public Service Providers.

=== Political career ===
In 2025, Van Berkel appeared in second place on the draft candidate list for D66 ahead of the October 2025 general election. When the final list was determined, party members moved her to the sixth position. In the election, she received 41,438 preferential votes.

On 9 February 2026, during the 2025–2026 cabinet formation, D66 nominated Van Berkel for the position of state secretary for Finance in the forthcoming Jetten cabinet. However, she withdrew from consideration on 16 February, after media reports revealed inaccuracies in the educational background listed on her CV. While she had briefly enrolled in public administration and law programmes at Leiden University and Erasmus University Rotterdam, her LinkedIn profile incorrectly implied that she had completed those studies. Following questions from journalists, Van Berkel amended her public résumé. She explained that she "could have been more explicit" about her educational history and that she had previously completed the information "to the best of her knowledge and belief". According to D66, she had disclosed during the internal selection process that she had not completed a degree, but the party later stated that this should have been made clearer on her CV.

A day later, Van Berkel also resigned as a member of parliament. She was replaced by Eelco Eerenberg as candidate for state secretary of Finance.

== Electoral history ==
Electoral history of Nathalie van Berkel
Year	Body	Party	Pos.	Votes	Result		Ref.
Year	Body	Party	Pos.	Votes	Party seats	Individual	Ref.
2025	House of Representatives	Democrats 66	6	41,438	26	Won	
