= Joost Sneller =

Dutch politician (born 1982)

- Sneller in 2026

Member of the Dutch House of Representatives
- Incumbent
- Assumed office 31 October 2017

Municipal councillor of The Hague
- In office 2010–2014

Personal details
- Born: Joost Caspar Sneller; 24 July 1982 (age 44) Haarlem, Netherlands
- Party: D66
- Education: Utrecht University (BA Johns Hopkins University (MA) Leiden University (BLL)
- Occupation: Politician

Joost Caspar Sneller (born 24 July 1982) is a Dutch politician representing D66 in the House of Representatives

== Career ==
Sneller was a personal assistant to MP Lousewies van der Laan and was associated with the D66 House of Representatives group for various periods as a policy officer and both official and political secretary. He was municipal councillor of The Hague from 2010 to 2014 and director of the Hans van Mierlo Foundation from 2016 to 2017. On 31 October 2017, Sneller was installed as a member of the House of Representatives, and he received the portfolio of internal affairs, justice, drugs, democratic renewal, general affairs and the Royal House.

After his November 2023 re-election, his focus changed to finances, economic affairs, taxes, justice, internal affairs, and the Royal House. Responding to a personnel shortage in prisons, he worked with Jesse Six Dijkstra (NSC) and Derk Boswijk (CDA) on a bill to allow courts to impose house arrest and electronic ankle monitoring as an alternative to short prison sentences. They argued that it would additionally help lower the risk of repeat offenses. Along with several other parties, he also proposed allowing judges to impose community service instead of detention for those who fail to pay fines. State Secretary for Justice and Security Ingrid Coenradie gave her blessing to the plan. Sneller filed a motion urging the cabinet to include "minimal material requirements for internal party democracy" in its bill on political parties, which would prohibit the Party for Freedom (PVV) from continuing to have only one member. The motion did not gain majority support in the House of Representatives.

== Electoral history ==
Electoral history of Joost Sneller
Year	Body	Party	Pos.	Votes	Result		Ref.
Year	Body	Party	Pos.	Votes	Party seats	Individual	Ref.
2017	House of Representatives	Democrats 66	22	547	19	Lost (Note: Sneller was appointed to the body later during the term due to a vacancy.)	
2021	House of Representatives	Democrats 66	14	933	24	Won	
2023	House of Representatives	Democrats 66	5	2,094	9	Won	
2025	House of Representatives	Democrats 66	5	5,806	26	Won	
