= Heikant, Cranendonck =

Heikant
- Hamlet
- Location in the province of North Brabant in the Netherlands Heikant (Netherlands)
- Coordinates: 51°15′39″N 5°35′0″E
- Country: Netherlands
- Province: North Brabant
- Municipality: Cranendonck

Area
  - Total: 4.25 km^{2} (1.64 sq mi)
- Elevation: 33 m (108 ft)

Population (2021)
  - Total: 420
  - Density: 99/km^{2} (260/sq mi)
- Time zone: UTC+1 (CET)
  - Summer (DST): UTC+2 (CEST)
- Postal code: 6021
- Dialing code: 0495

Heikant is a hamlet in the Dutch province of North Brabant. It is located in the municipality of Cranendonck, about 1.5 km southeast of Budel.

Together with the hamlets of Meemortel and Bosch to the north, Heikant has a population of about 420.

According to the 19th-century historian A.J. van der Aa, Heikant (or "De Heikant") consisted of 22 houses and had a population of 140 in the middle of the 19th century. Heikant has no place name signs and consists of about 80 houses and 125 industrial buildings.

Heikant should not be confused with the former hamlet with the same name near Gastel, 4 km to the northwest, or with any of the other hamlets named Heikant in the Netherlands.
