= Soerendonk en Sterksel =

Coordinates: 51.303145°N 5.574188°E

Soerendonk en Sterksel was a municipality in the Dutch province of North Brabant. It consisted of two parts, one containing the village Soerendonk and one containing Sterksel. The two parts were separated by the municipalities of Maarheeze and Leende.

The municipality existed until 1821, when it merged with Gastel to form the new municipality Soerendonk, Sterksel en Gastel.

Though located in North Brabant near Eindhoven, the spoken dialect is a combination of Heeze-enLeendes (a distinct East Brabantian dialect) and Budels (linguistically a Limburgish dialect), rather than Kempenlands (linguistically a main East Brabantian dialect in the region).
