= Toom, Netherlands =

Toom
- Hamlet
- Location in the province of North Brabant in the Netherlands Toom (Netherlands)
- Coordinates: 51°16′12″N 5°33′35″E
- Country: Netherlands
- Province: North Brabant
- Municipality: Cranendonck

Area
  - Total: 4.25 km^{2} (1.64 sq mi)
- Elevation: 33 m (108 ft)

Population (2021)
  - Total: 355
  - Density: 83.5/km^{2} (216/sq mi)
- Time zone: UTC+1 (CET)
  - Summer (DST): UTC+2 (CEST)
- Postal code: 6021
- Dialing code: 0495

Toom is a hamlet in the Dutch province of North Brabant. It is located in the municipality of Cranendonck, about 1 km west of Budel, and a few hundred metres from the Belgian border.

In the middle of the 19th century, the hamlet had a population of 140. Currently, together with neighbouring Berg, the hamlet has 355 inhabitants. It was first mentioned in 1225 as "tegen die toym", and means burial hill. Toom has no place name signs, and consists of about 70 houses.
