= Berg, North Brabant =

Berg
- Hamlet
- Location in the province of North Brabant in the Netherlands Berg (Netherlands)
- Coordinates: 51°16′33″N 5°32′55″E
- Country: Netherlands
- Province: North Brabant
- Municipality: Cranendonck

Area
  - Total: 4.25 km^{2} (1.64 sq mi)
- Elevation: 33 m (108 ft)

Population (2021)
  - Total: 355
  - Density: 83.5/km^{2} (216/sq mi)
- Time zone: UTC+1 (CET)
  - Summer (DST): UTC+2 (CEST)
- Postal code: 6021
- Dialing code: 0495

Berg (Dutch pronunciation: [ˈbɛr(ə)x]) is a hamlet in the Dutch province of North Brabant. It is located in the municipality of Cranendonck, about 2 km northwest of Budel, and a few hundred metres from the Belgian border.

It was first mentioned in 1794 as Berg, and means hill. There are no place name signs. Berg was home to 90 people in 1840. Nowadays, it consists of about 60 houses.

Together with neighbouring Toom, the hamlet has 355 inhabitants.
