= Bosch, Netherlands =

Bosch
- Hamlet
- Location in the province of North Brabant in the Netherlands Bosch (Netherlands)
- Coordinates: 51°16′12″N 5°35′30″E
- Country: Netherlands
- Province: North Brabant
- Municipality: Cranendonck

Area
  - Total: 1.95 km^{2} (0.75 sq mi)
- Elevation: 33 m (108 ft)

Population (2021)
  - Total: 420
  - Density: 220/km^{2} (560/sq mi)
- Time zone: UTC+1 (CET)
  - Summer (DST): UTC+2 (CEST)
- Postal code: 6021
- Dialing code: 0495

Bosch (Dutch pronunciation: [boːsx]) is a hamlet in the Dutch province of North Brabant. It is located in the municipality of Cranendonck which is approximately 1.5 km east of Budel.

Together with the hamlets of Meemortel and Heikant to the south, Bosch has a population of about 420.

It was first mentioned in 1307 as Henricus de Silua and means "forest". According to the 19th-century historian A.J. van der Aa, Bosch consisted of 23 houses and had a population of 150 to 160 people in the middle of the 19th century. It was built on a dyke in heath lands. Bosch has no place name signs, and consists of about 100 houses.
