= Heikant, Gastel =

Coordinates: 51.285°N 5.547°E

Heikant was a hamlet in the municipality of Cranendonck, in the Dutch province of North Brabant. It is now a part of the village of Gastel (also in the municipality of Cranendonck).
