= Soerendonk, Sterksel en Gastel =

Coordinates: 51°18′N 5°35′E

Coat of Arms

Soerendonk, Sterksel en Gastel was a municipality in the Dutch province of North Brabant. It consisted of two parts, one containing the village Soerendonk and Gastel and one containing Sterksel. The two parts were separated by the municipalities of Maarheeze and Leende.

The municipality was created in 1821, in a merger of the municipalities of Soerendonk en Sterksel and Gastel, and existed until 1925, when it merged with Maarheeze.
