= Soerendonk =

- Village
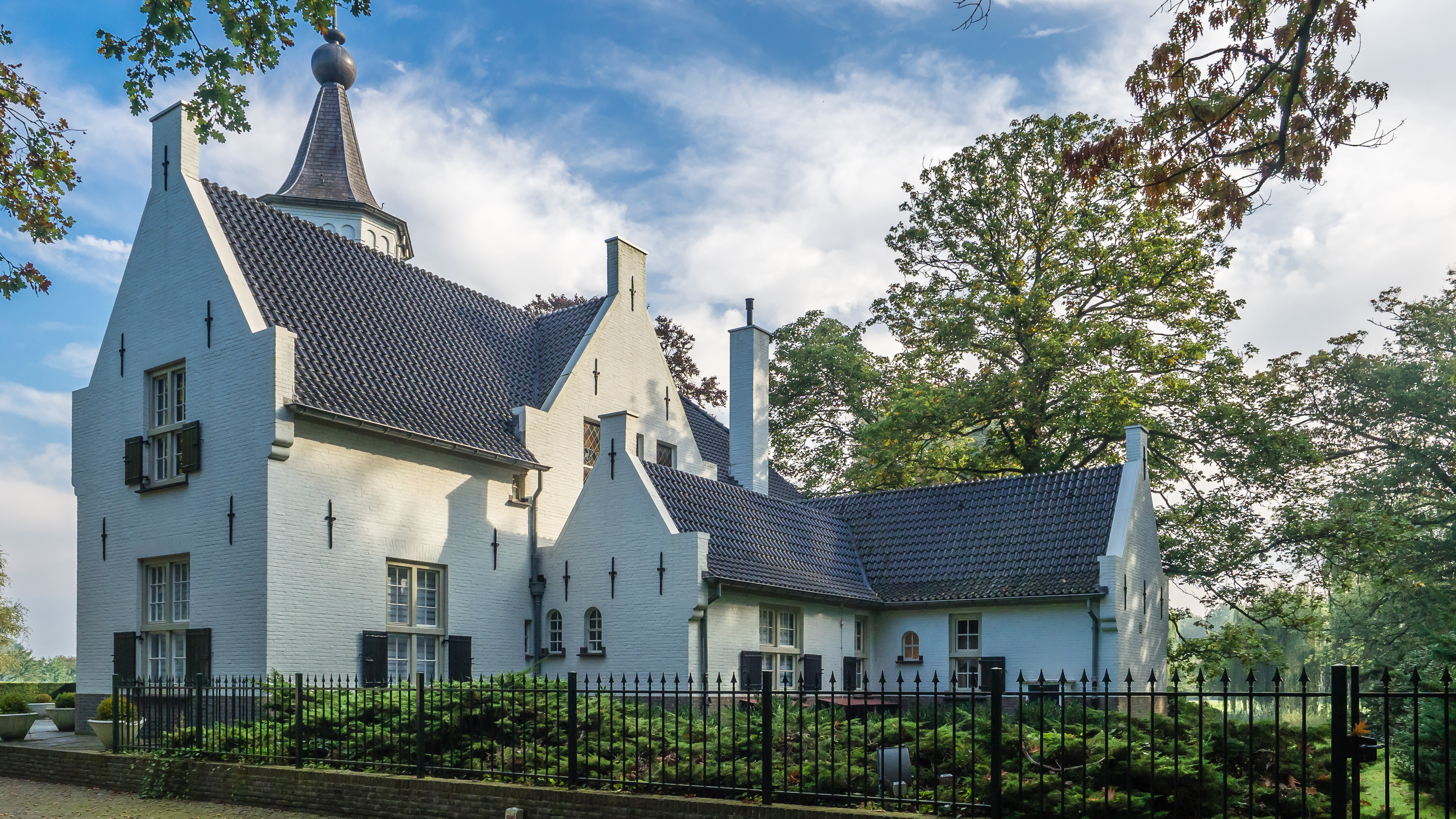
- Villa Cranendonck (former town hall)

- Location within North Brabant Location within Netherlands
- Coordinates: 51.3020°N 5.5731°E
- Country: Netherlands
- Province: North Brabant
- Municipality: Cranendonck

Area
  - Total: 11.68 km^{2} (4.51 sq mi)
- Elevation: 28 m (92 ft)

Population (2021)
  - Total: 1,810
  - Density: 155/km^{2} (401/sq mi)
- Time zone: UTC+1 (CET)
  - Summer (DST): UTC+2 (CEST)
- Postal code: 6027
- Dialing code: 0495

Soerendonk is a village in the Dutch province of North Brabant. It is located in the municipality of Cranendonck. The former Cranendonck Castle used to be located in the village. It is located about 17 kilometres (11 mi) south-south-east of Eindhoven.

== History ==
The village was first mentioned in 1307 as Zurendonc. The etymology is unclear. Soerendonk is a brook valley village which developed in the Late Middle Ages.

The Catholic John the Baptist Beheading Church is a Gothic Revival cruciform church built between 1836 and 1838. The tower was added between 1908 and 1910, and the transept and choir were redesigned in 1932.

Soerendonk was home to 560 people in 1840. The village used to be part of the municipality Soerendonk, Sterksel en Gastel. In 1925, it was merged with Maarheeze. In 1997, it became part of the municipality of Cranendonck.

== Cranendonck Castle ==
Cranendonck Castle was built around 1250. In 1551, it became property of the House of Orange-Nassau by marriage. In 1673, it was blown up by the French, and only ruins remained. The ruins used to the crown land, but became private property in 1820. In 1899, the remains were demolished and a villa was constructed at the site. In 1938, the villa was bought by the municipality of Maarheeze and converted into town hall. It served as town hall from 1940 until 1997 when the municipality was merged with Budel into Cranendonck.

== Notable people ==
- Toine van Mierlo (born 1957), former Netherlands international footballer

== Gallery ==
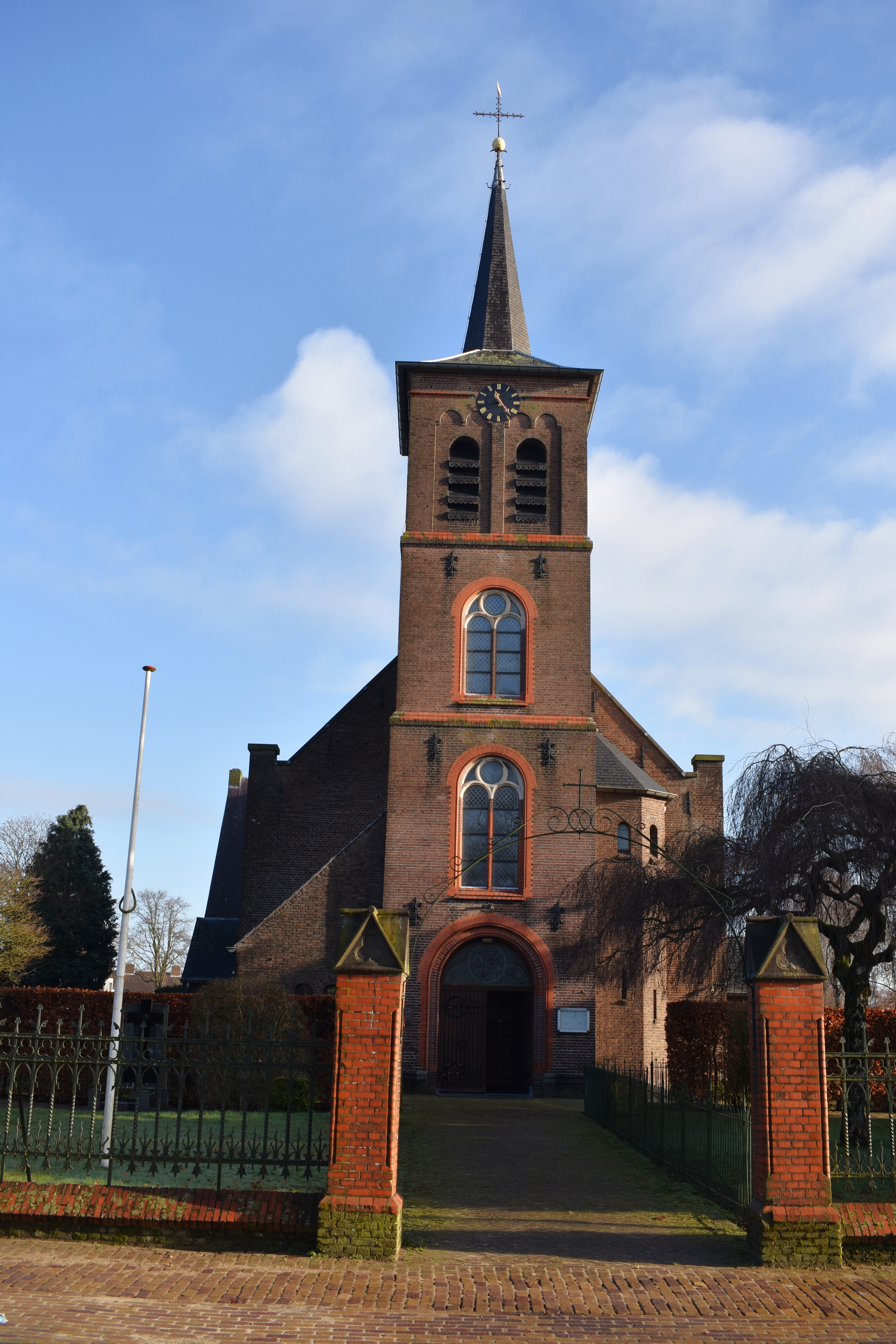
John the Baptist Beheading Church

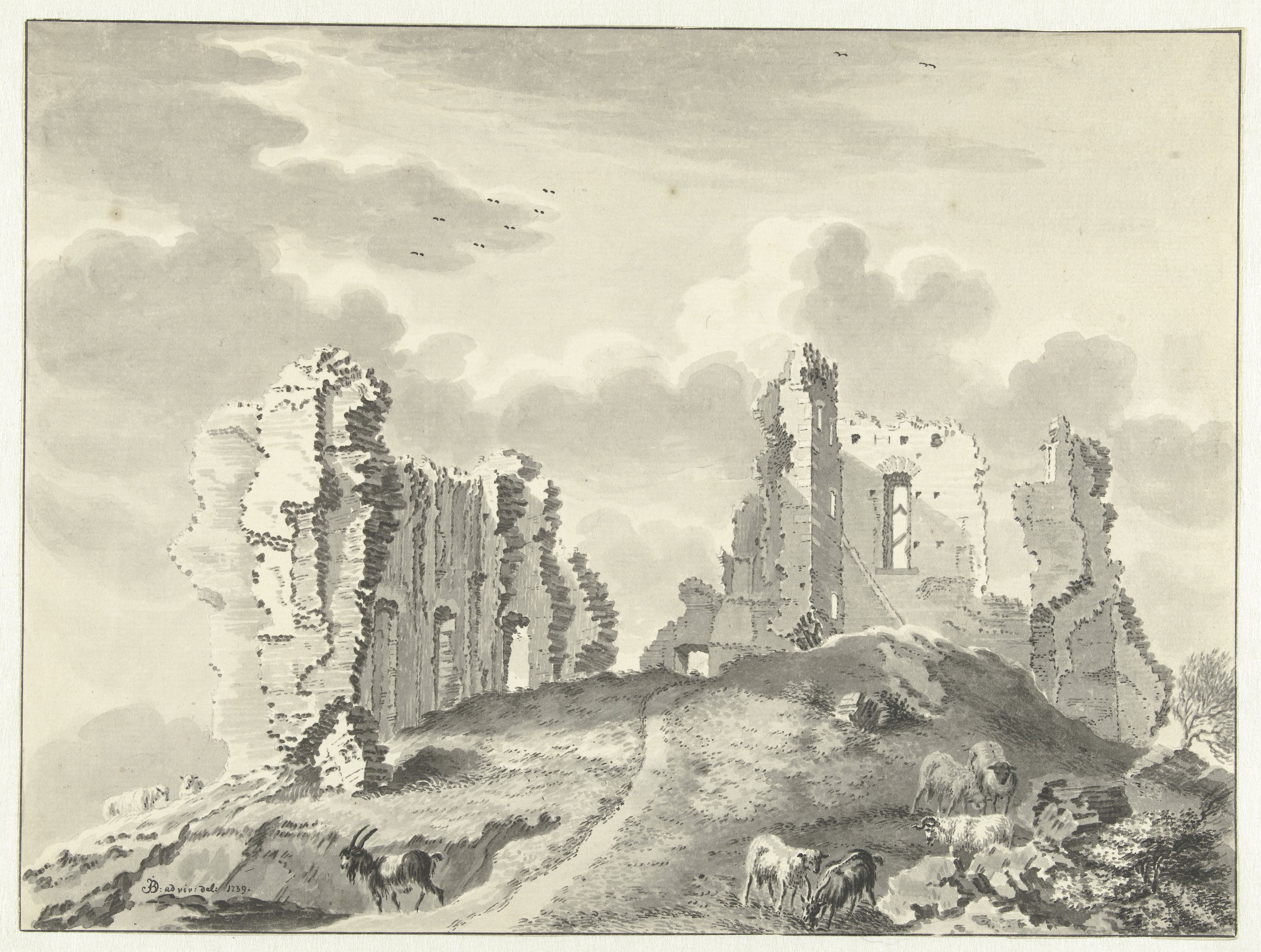
Drawing of the ruins of the castle (1738-1739)

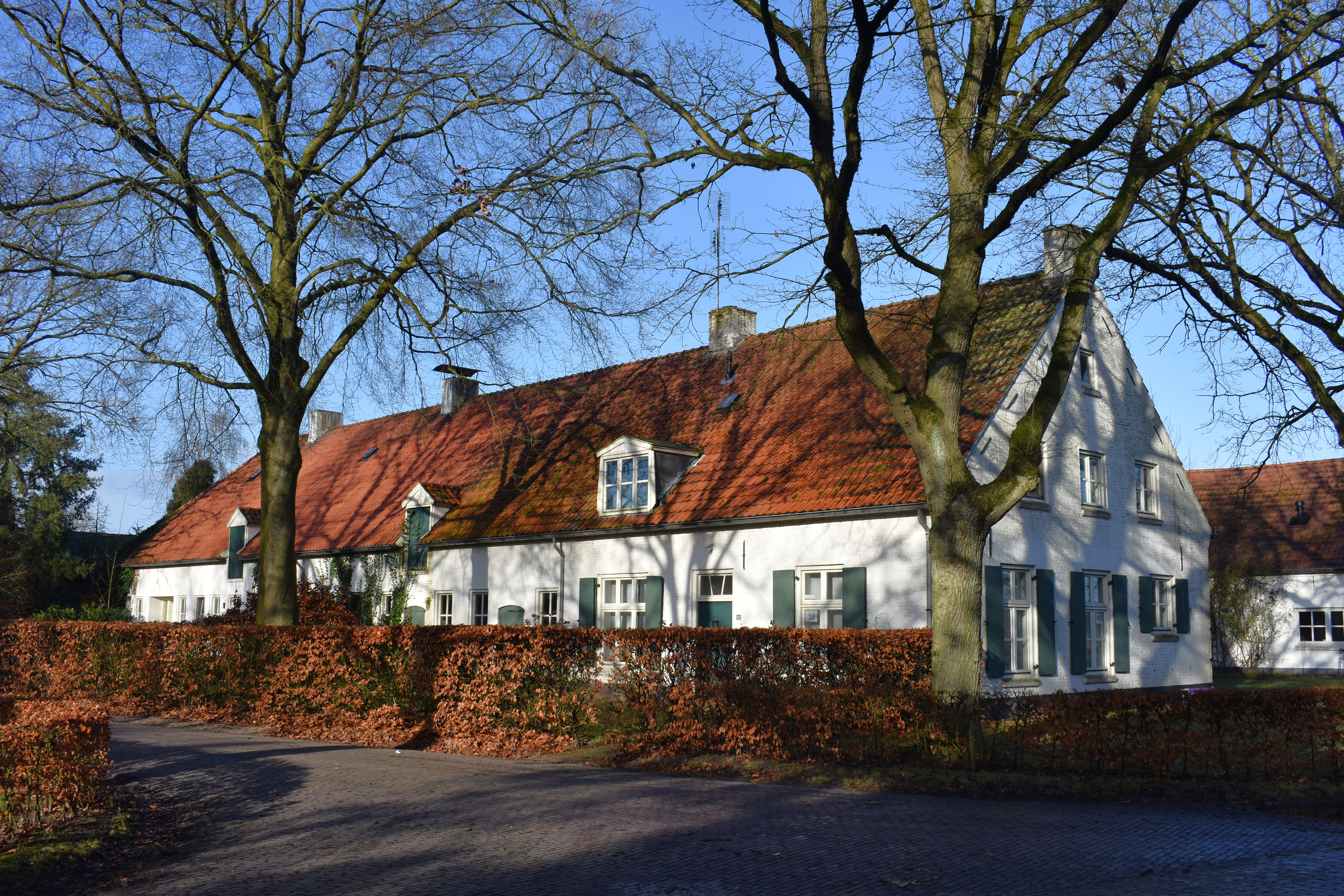
Building in Soerendonk

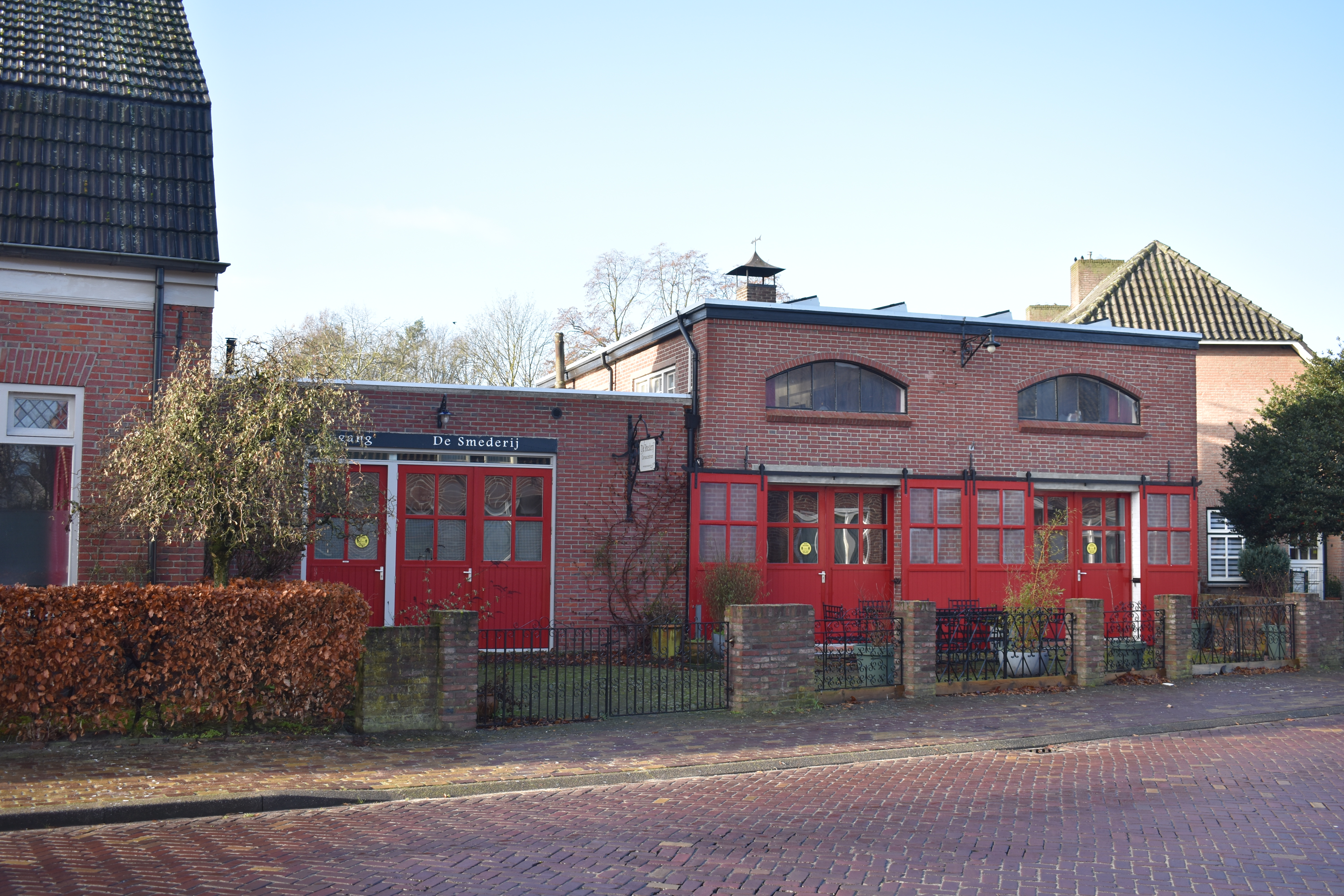
Former forge
