= Budel-Dorplein =

- Village
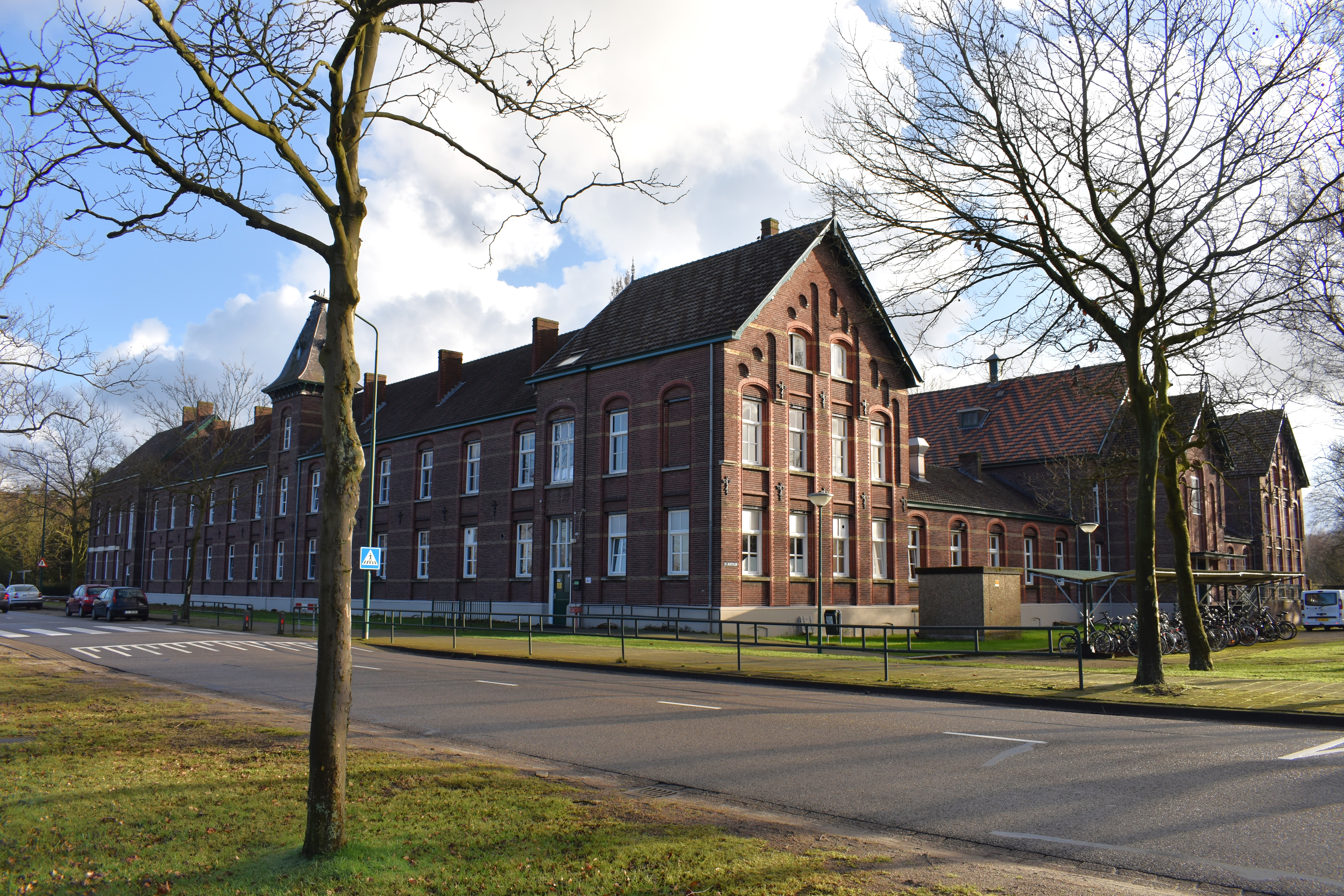
- Hotel St Joseph

- Location in the province of North Brabant in the Netherlands Budel-Dorplein (Netherlands)
- Coordinates: 51°14′21″N 5°34′11″E
- Country: Netherlands
- Province: North Brabant
- Municipality: Cranendonck
- Established: 1892

Area
  - Total: 10.55 km^{2} (4.07 sq mi)
- Elevation: 35 m (115 ft)

Population (2021)
  - Total: 1,405
  - Density: 133.2/km^{2} (344.9/sq mi)
- Time zone: UTC+1 (CET)
  - Summer (DST): UTC+2 (CEST)
- Postal code: 6024
- Dialing code: 0495

Budel-Dorplein is a village in the municipality of Cranendonck, Netherlands. The village was established in 1892 for a zinc factory by Emile Dor.

== History ==
The village was first mentioned in 1893 as Dorplein. It was established by Emile Dor who built houses for the workers of his zinc factory in 1892. The suffix -plein means square. The village was initially called Nieuwdorp.

The factory was built in 1892 and originally consisted of six ovens, a factory hall and an office building. Many more buildings were added later, and few of the original factory buildings remain.

The St Joseph Hotel was a building built between 1896 and 1898. The building contained a hotel for the workers at the factory, but also a boys and girls school, shops, a bakery and a recreational facility. The inside was modernised in 1950. In 1985, it was sold and is in use for asylum seekers.

The Catholic St Joseph Church was built in 1951 and 1952 and has two towers.

The village used to be owned by the factory until 1968, when it became public domain and one of the villages of the municipality of Budel. The inhabitants also received the right to buy their own house instead of renting it from the factory. The zinc factory is nowadays owned by Nyrstar.

== Gallery ==
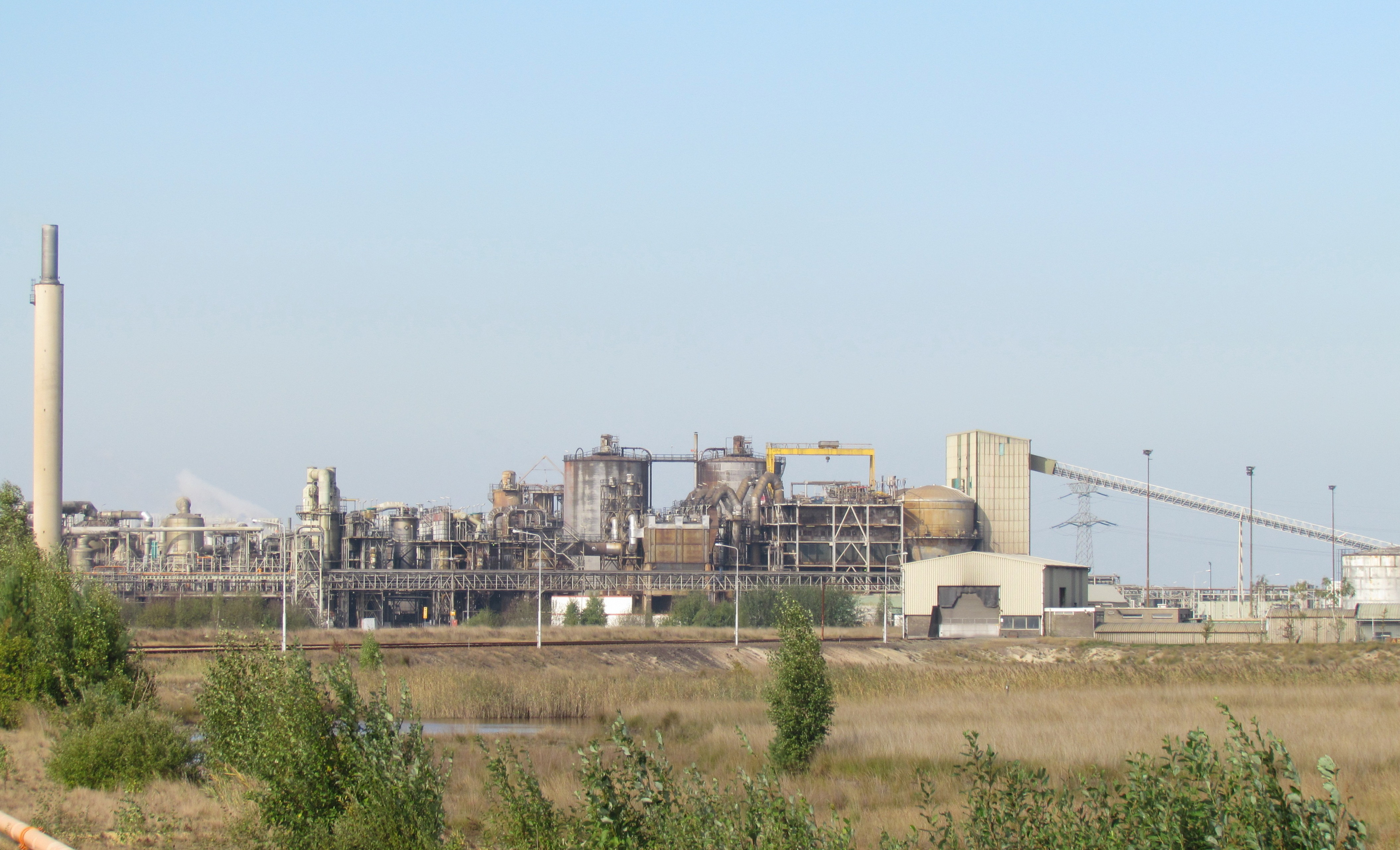
Zinc factory

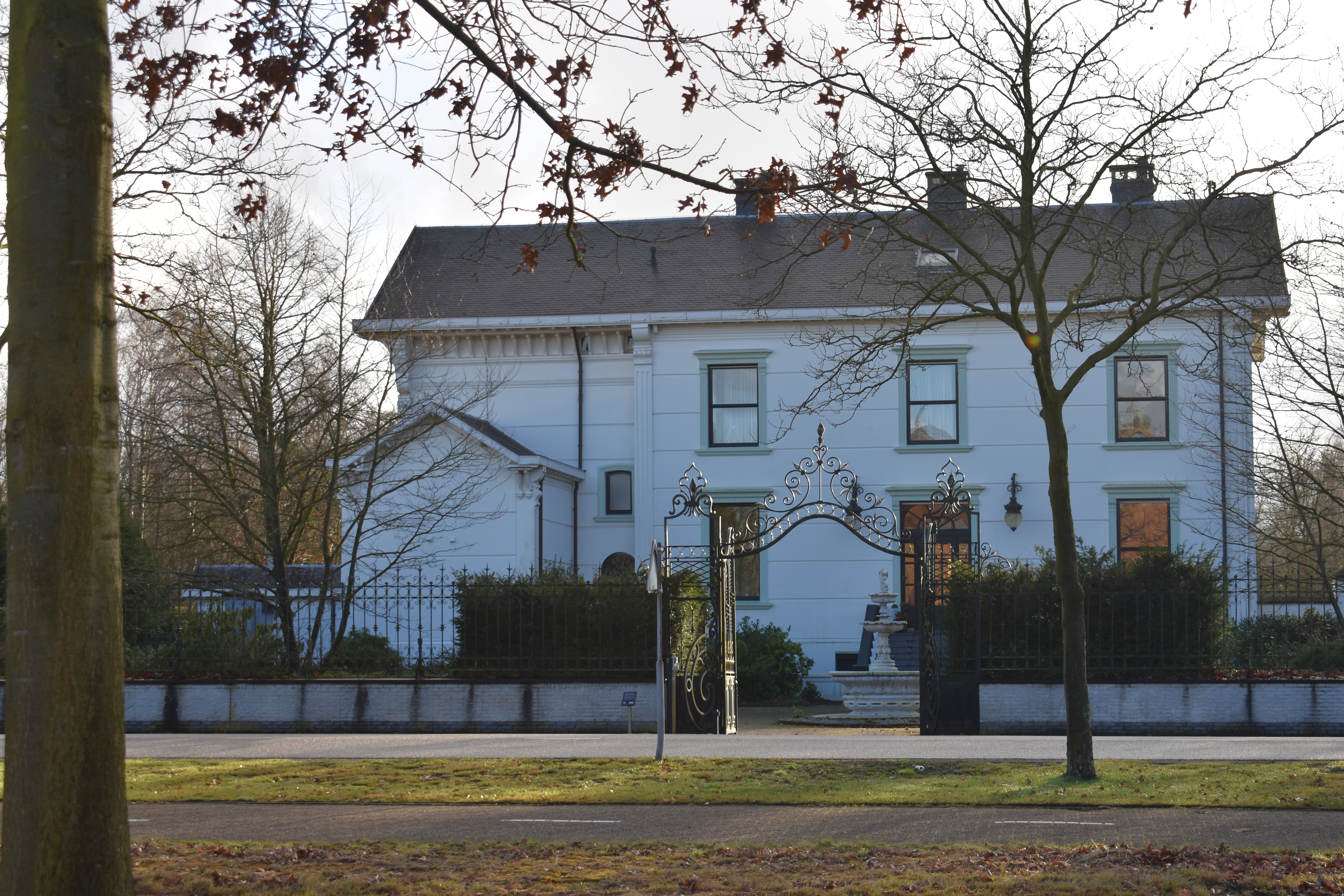
Former factory director's home: De Witte Villa

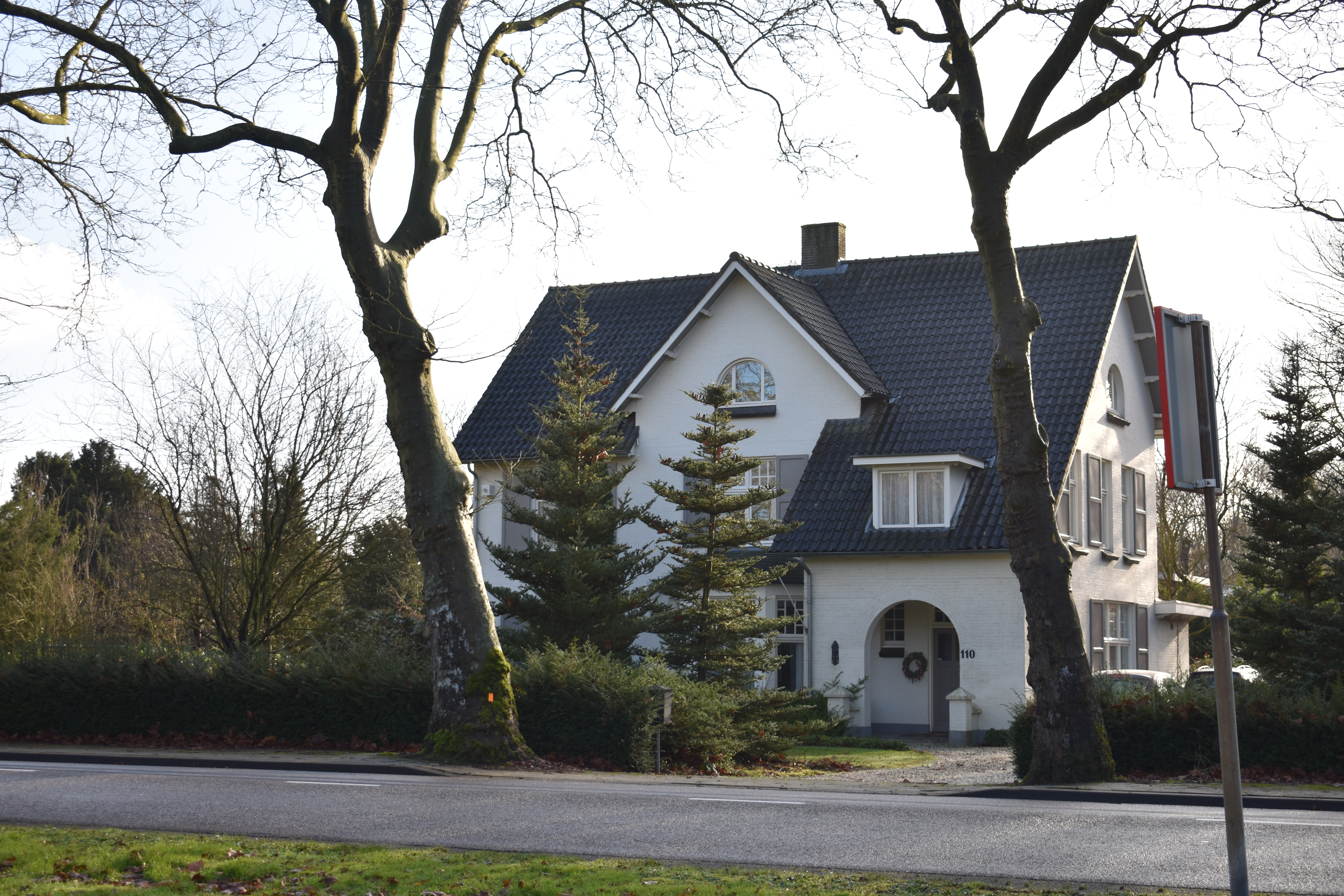
House in Budel-Dorplein

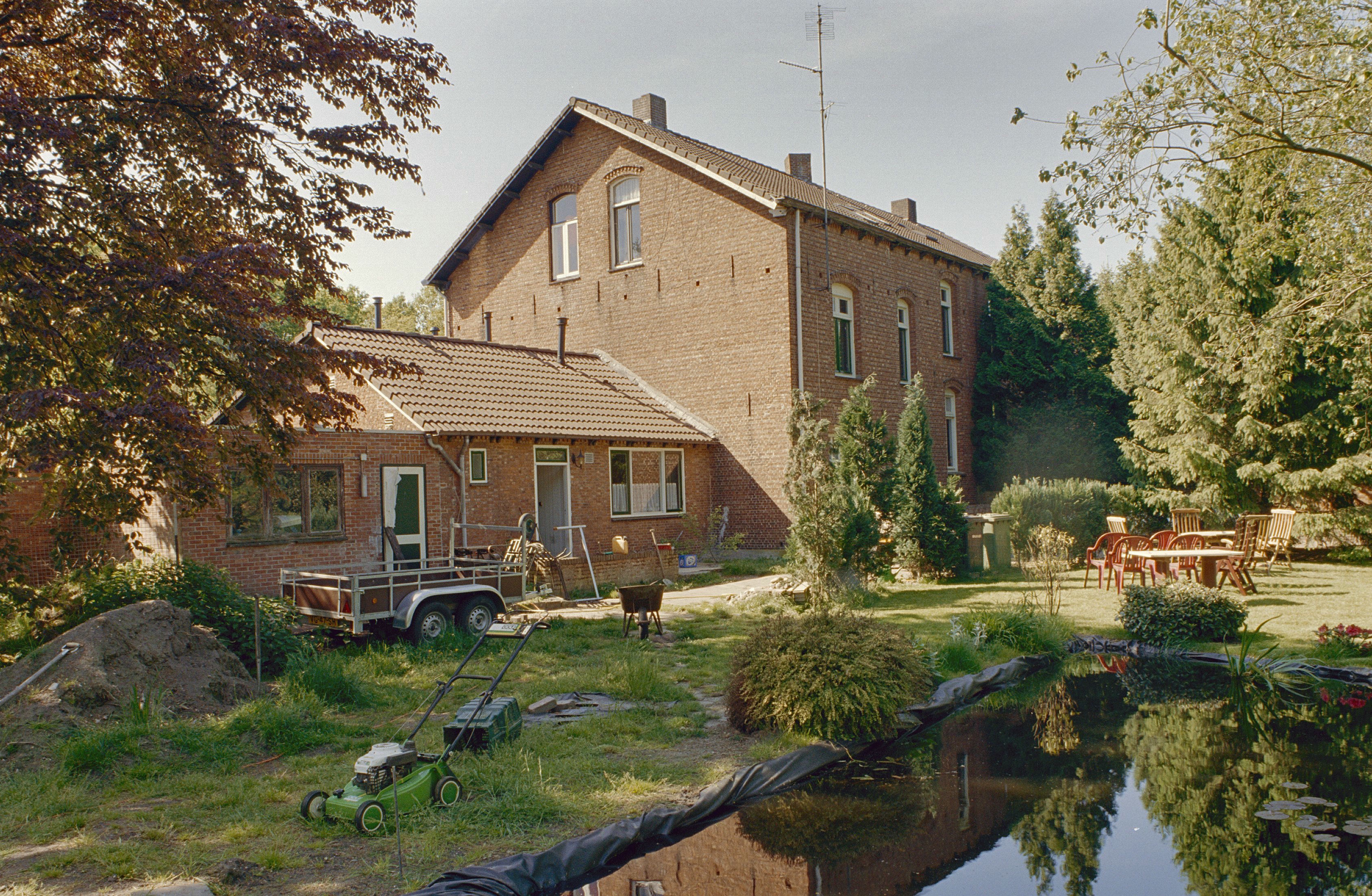
House in Budel-Dorplein
