= Budelse Brouwerij =

Dutch brewery

- Industry: Alcoholic beverage
- Founded: 1870 as De Hoop
- Founder: Gerardus Arts
- Headquarters: Nieuwstraat 9, Budel, Netherlands
- Products: Beer
- Owner: Gerard, Carine and Harry Arts
- Number of employees: c. 20
- Website: Budelse Brouwerij

The Budelse Brouwerij is a Dutch brewery in Budel, North Brabant.

== History ==
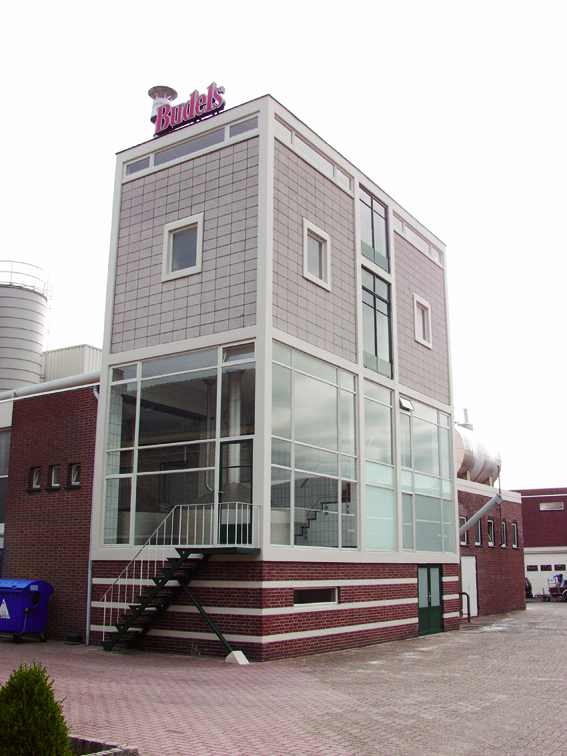
The brewery in Budel

The brewery was founded in 1870 as Brewery De Hoop. In the 1960s, the name of the brewery was changed to Budelse Brouwerij. Founder Gerardus Arts came from Oss, and had learned brewing at the Snieders family (later Dommelsch Brewery) in Dommelen, and at brewery De Kroon in Oirschot. In 1870 he had married Anna Maria Maas. The Maas family provided the funding for the small brewery.

In 1879 the railroad Iron Rhine was finished, and a railway station was opened in Budel-Schoot. Gerard Arts opened a hotel named Brouwershuis. Meanwhile, Budel expanded and a zinc smelting factory was founded. At the time De Hoop competed with the older brewery of the Rutten family, who were very influential in Budel. In 1899 a third brewery was founded by A.J. de Winkel, later led by Nelissen.

=== Early twentieth century ===
The invention of Pilsner beer in 1842 would radically change the beer market. Producing Pilsner in the Netherlands required artificial refrigeration. From about 1870, the first steam powered pilsner breweries were founded in the Netherlands. At the time, brewing pilsner required so much capital, that small breweries like Budels could not compete on that market. Meanwhile, the public moved towards the new industrial beers.

During World War I a shortage of commodities would spell the end for many small Dutch brewers. Both the Rutten brewery, and the Nelissen brewery closed down in 1917. In 1921 Budels started to mechanize its production. In 1922 the brewery also started to produce lemonade, using the label Favoriet. The most significant investments took place in the 1930s, when most local competitors had disappeared.

=== Post World War II ===
The Budelse Brouwerij was one of the few breweries which survived the rigorous concentration in the Dutch beer market after World War II. In 1945 there were 80 breweries left in the Netherlands. In 1950 there were 58 breweries left in the Netherlands. By 1968 there were only 20 Dutch breweries left. In 1975 the number was 13.

Meanwhile, the pilsner part of the beer market had increased from just over 50% before the war to almost 99% in 1980. The average consumption of beer increased from 10.1 liter just after the war to 89.1 liter per capita in 1981.

== Budelse Brouwerij today ==
The 1980s were the time that the Dutch public started to look for something different, whether this was traditional beer, or foreign beers. Up till the mid-1980s the Budelse Brouwerij brewery made Pilsner, 'sweetened Oud bruin' (not to be confused with Oud Bruin), and Bock. It then expanded its portfolio with Capucijn abdijbier (warm fermentation), Altbier and introduced the name Parel for some specialty beers.

Brewing eco-friendly beer is a specialization of Budelse Brouwerij. The brewery was ahead of its time when it started on this market in the 1990s.

In 2009, Budelse Brouwerij was one of the country's largest microbreweries.
