= Wendy van Eijk =

Dutch politician (born 1973)

Member of the House of Representatives
- Incumbent
- Assumed office 9 December 2023

Personal details
- Born: 14 February 1973 (age 52) Maarheeze, Netherlands
- Party: VVD

Wendy van Eijk-Nagel (born 14 February 1973) is a Dutch politician from the People's Party for Freedom and Democracy who was elected to the Dutch Parliament in the 2023 Dutch general election. She was a member of the Provincial Council of Limburg from 29 March to 7 September 2023.

In the House of Representatives, Van Eijk was the VVD's spokesperson on taxes, mental healthcare, assisted living, sports, and war victims. Later, all but taxes were replaced with childcare benefits scandal, finances of lower governments, child care, and poverty.

== House committee assignments ==
- Committee for the Interior (vice chair)
- Committee for Economic Affairs
- Public Expenditure committee
- Committee for Finance
- Committee for Foreign Trade and Development
- Committee for Climate Policy and Green Growth

== Electoral history ==
Electoral history of Wendy van Eijk
Year	Body	Party	Pos.	Votes	Result		Ref.
Year	Body	Party	Pos.	Votes	Party seats	Individual	Ref.
2023	House of Representatives	People's Party for Freedom and Democracy	17	5,900	24	Won	
2025	House of Representatives	People's Party for Freedom and Democracy	7	17,324	22	Won	

== See also ==
- List of members of the House of Representatives of the Netherlands, 2023–present
