= Kempen Airport =

Kempen Airport Budel Aerodrome
- IATA: QEK; ICAO: EHBD

Summary
- Airport type: Public
- Operator: Budel Aerodrome b.v./ Kempen Airport
- Location: Budel
- Elevation AMSL: 114 ft / 35 m
- Coordinates: 51°15′16″N 005°36′03″E
- Interactive map of Kempen Airport

Runways
Direction	Length		Surface
Direction	m	ft	Surface
03/21	1,199	3,934	Concrete/Asphalt
03/21	600	1,969	Grass
- Sources: AIP

Kempen Airport or Budel Airport (Dutch: Vliegveld Kempen), also just called Budel after the nearby town, is a general aviation airport in the south-east of the Netherlands located 5 NM (9.3 km; 5.8 mi) west of Weert and near the border with Belgium. Its main runway, 03/21, is a 1,199 m (3,934 ft) long asphalt runway. There is a second runway for microlight aircraft only, located next to the main runway, and is 600 m (1,969 ft) long.

The airport opened in 1970, initially only with a grass runway. An asphalt runway with a length of 930 m (3,051 ft) was constructed in 1991, and was later expanded to its current length. Approach and runway lighting followed, making the airport suitable for IFR flights. With around 80,000 movements (a movement being a takeoff or landing) a year, it is amongst the busiest general aviation airports in the Netherlands. International flights are allowed to and from the airport and it is used extensively by business aircraft, accounting for 80% of all aircraft movements.

== Accidents ==
- On October 26, 2009, a Pilatus PC-12 registered PH-RUL on its way to Frankfurt Egelsbach Airport crashed in a field shortly after take-off from Kempen Airport's runway 21. Two people on board died. An investigation was performed by the Dutch Safety Board; however, the cause of the accident was never conclusively determined. The aircraft was relatively new, having had its first flight in May 2009.
