= Toine van Mierlo =

Dutch footballer

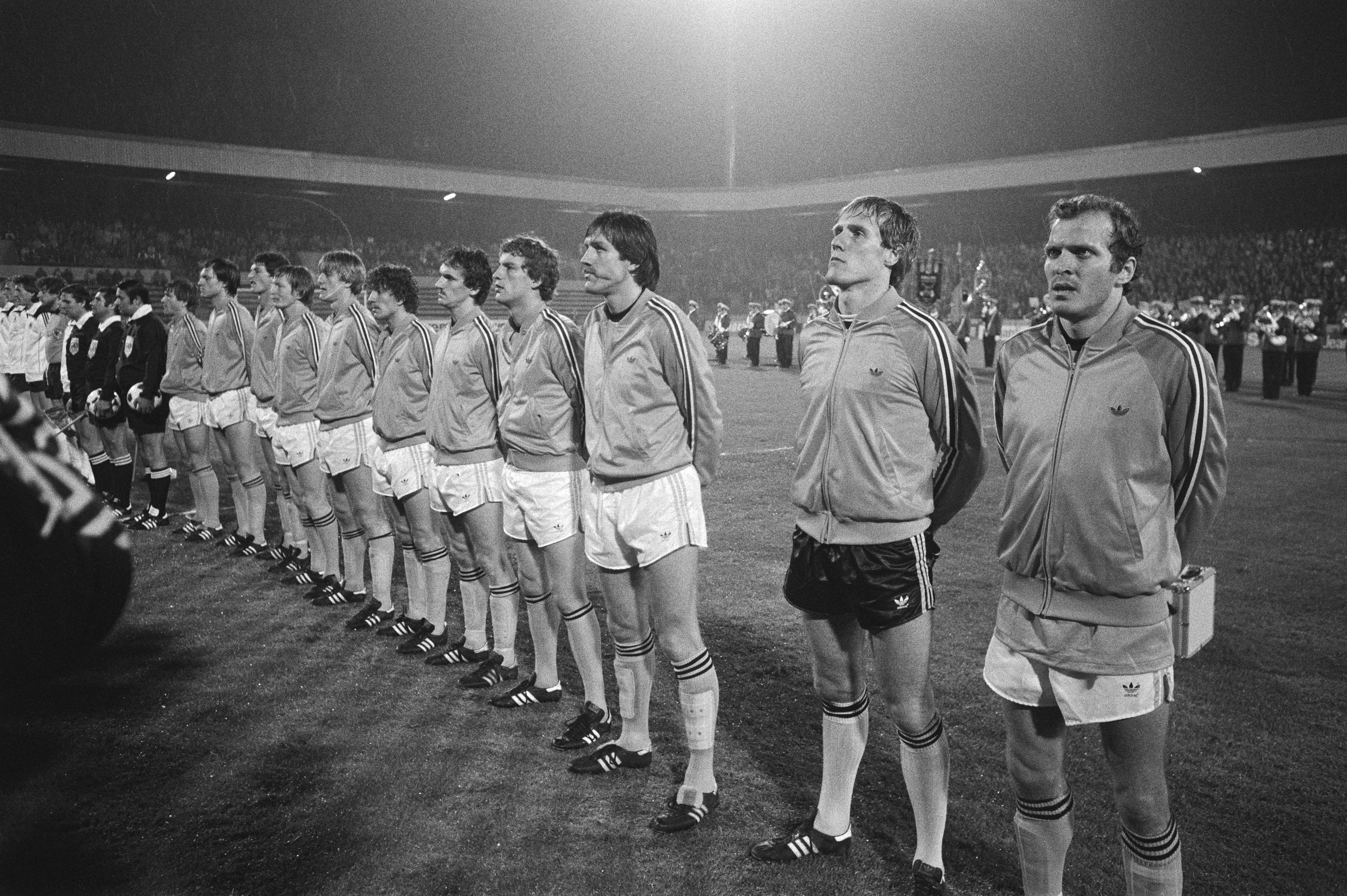
- Toine van Mierlo amidst the Dutch national football team (Oct. 1980)

Personal information
- Full name: Antonius Wilhelmus Matthias Theodore van Mierlo
- Date of birth: 24 August 1957 (age 69)
- Place of birth: Soerendonk, Netherlands
- Position: Winger

Youth career
- Kraanvogels

Senior career*
Years	Team	Apps	(Gls)
1976–1979	PSV Eindhoven	18	(0)
1979–1981	Willem II	65	(15)
1981–1982	Birmingham City	44	(4)
1982–1983	Willem II	22	(6)
1983–1985	R.W.D. Molenbeek	34	(1)
1985–1986	MVV Maastricht	25	(4)
1986–1988	K.A.A. Gent	46	(2)
1988–1990	K.R.C. Harelbeke		
1989	→ VVV-Venlo (loan)		

International career
1980	Netherlands	3	(0)
- * Club domestic league appearances and goals

Antonius Wilhelmus Matthias Theodore van Mierlo (born 24 August 1957), known in England as Tony van Mierlo, is a former Netherlands international footballer who played primarily as a left winger but can also play as a forward.

Van Mierlo was born in Soerendonk. He played for PSV Eindhoven, Willem II, MVV Maastricht and VVV-Venlo in the Netherlands, for Birmingham City in England and for R.W.D. Molenbeek, K.A.A. Gent and K.R.C. Harelbeke in Belgium. He won three caps for the Netherlands national football team in 1980. After his playing career ended he joined the coaching staff at former club Willem II, and went on to become chief scout and later technical coordinator for Roda JC.

== Honours ==
RWD Molenbeek

- Belgian Second Division winners: 1985
