= Nyrstar =

International producer of minerals and metals

- Type: Subsidiary
- ISIN: BE0974294267
- Industry: Metallurgy
- Founded: 23 August 2007
- Headquarters: Budel-Dorplein, Netherlands
- Products: Smelting and alloying of zinc and lead; Sulphuric acid production; Gold, silver and copper (as by-products)
- Number of employees: 4,000
- Parent: Trafigura
- Website: www.trafigura.com

Nyrstar is an international producer of minerals and metals. It was founded in August 2007 and listed on the Euronext Brussels that October.

Nyrstar has mining, smelting and other operations located in Europe, the United States and Australia and employs approximately 4,000 people. Its headquarters are in Budel-Dorplein, the Netherlands.

Nyrstar’s operating business is wholly owned by Trafigura, an independent commodity trading and supply chain logistics company.

== History ==
Nyrstar was created in 2007 by combining the zinc smelting and alloying operations of Zinifex (an Australian mining company, now merged with Oxiana to form Oz Minerals) and Umicore (a Belgian materials technology company).

Nyrstar was acquired by Trafigura in 2019.

In April 2026, Nyrstar sold its mines and smelter in Tennessee to Korea Zinc.
