= Maarheeze =

- Village
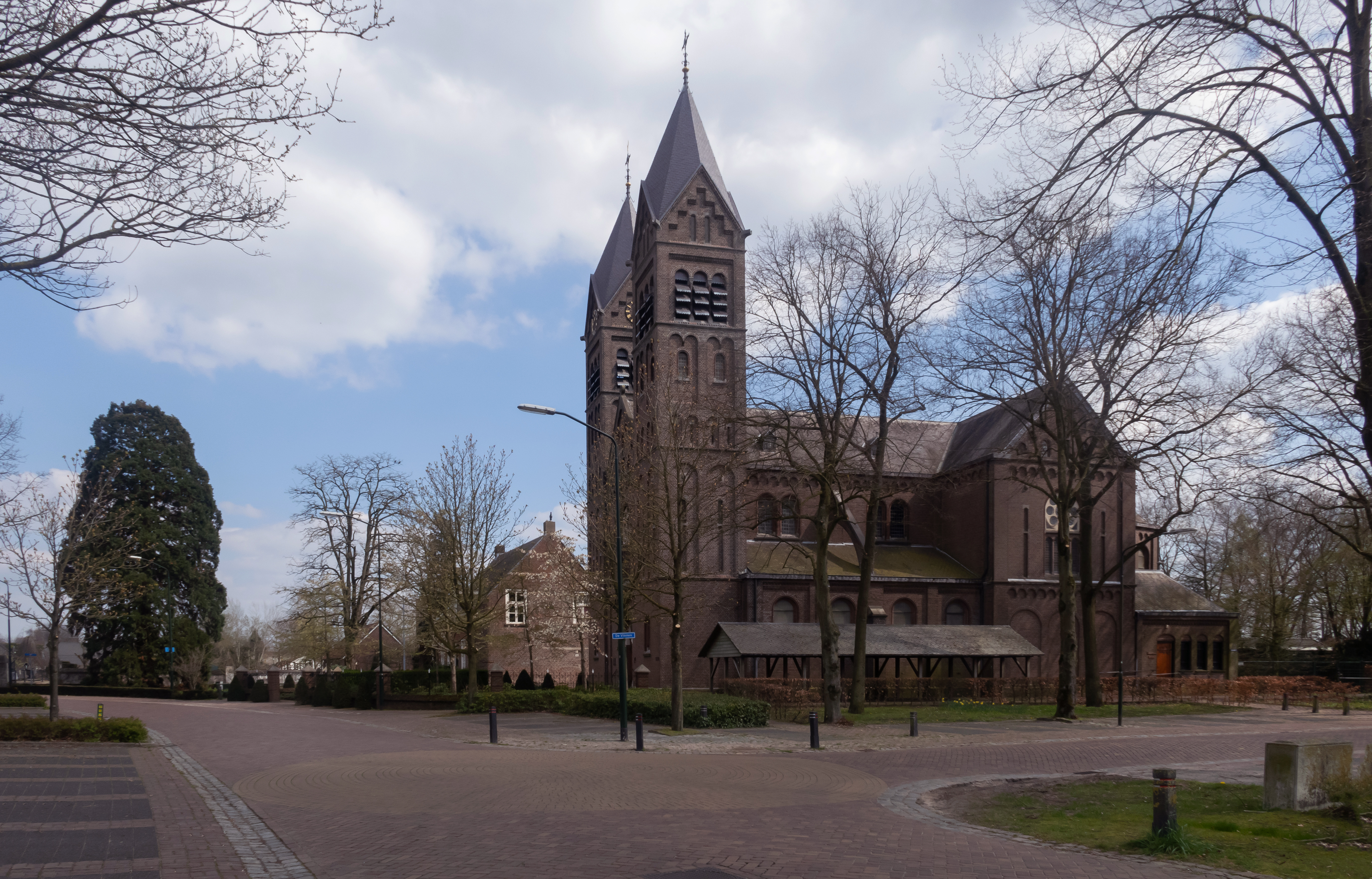
- Catholic church

- Flag Coat of arms

- Location within North Brabant Location within Netherlands Location within Europe
- Coordinates: 51°18′39″N 5°36′48″E
- Country: Netherlands
- Province: North Brabant
- Municipality: Cranendonck

Area
  - Total: 1.85 km^{2} (0.71 sq mi)
- Elevation: 28 m (92 ft)

Population (2021)
  - Total: 4,585
  - Density: 2,480/km^{2} (6,420/sq mi)
- Time zone: UTC+1 (CET)
  - Summer (DST): UTC+2 (CEST)
- Postal code: 6026
- Dialing code: 0495

Maarheeze is a village in the Dutch province of North Brabant. It is located in the municipality of Cranendonck, about 15 km southeast of Eindhoven, near the Belgian and the German borders.

== History ==
The village was first mentioned in 1223 as in Marresia. The etymology is unclear. Maarheeze is a church village which developed in the Early Middle Ages.

Maarheeze was home to 220 people in 1840. The Catholic St Gertrudis Church was built between 1909 and 1910 and has two towers. In 1913, a railway station was built in Maarheeze, however it closed in 1938 and the building was demolished in 1966. A new railway station was built in 2010. In 1955, a factory was opened by Philips.

Maarheeze used to be a separate municipality. It merged with Budel in 1997, and changed its name to Cranendonck.

Though located in North Brabant near Eindhoven, the spoken dialect is Budels (linguistically a Limburgish dialect), rather than Kempenlands (linguistically an East Brabantian dialect).

== Notable people ==
- Wendy van Eijk, politician
- Sylvia Hoeks, actress

== Gallery ==
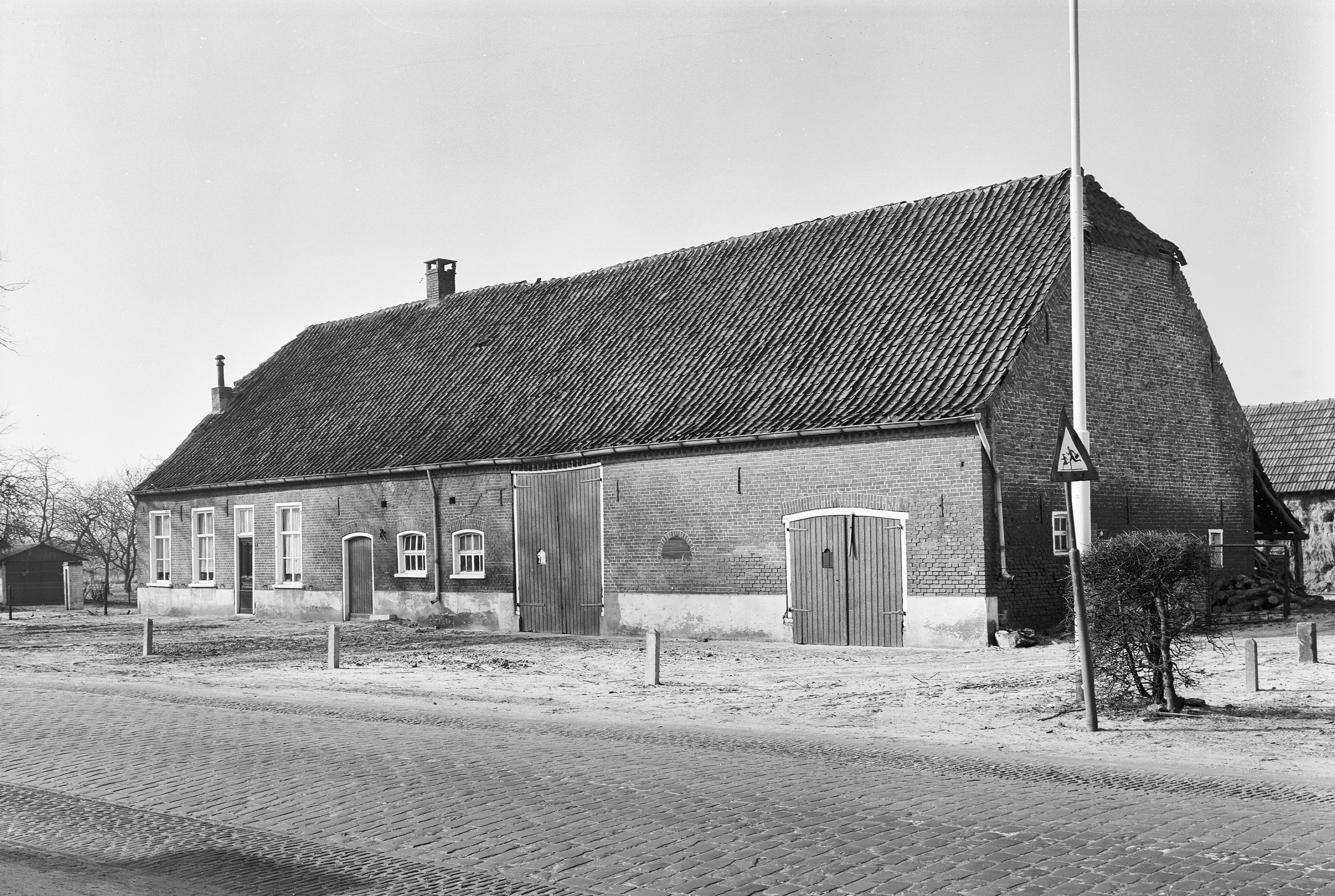
Street of Maarheeze

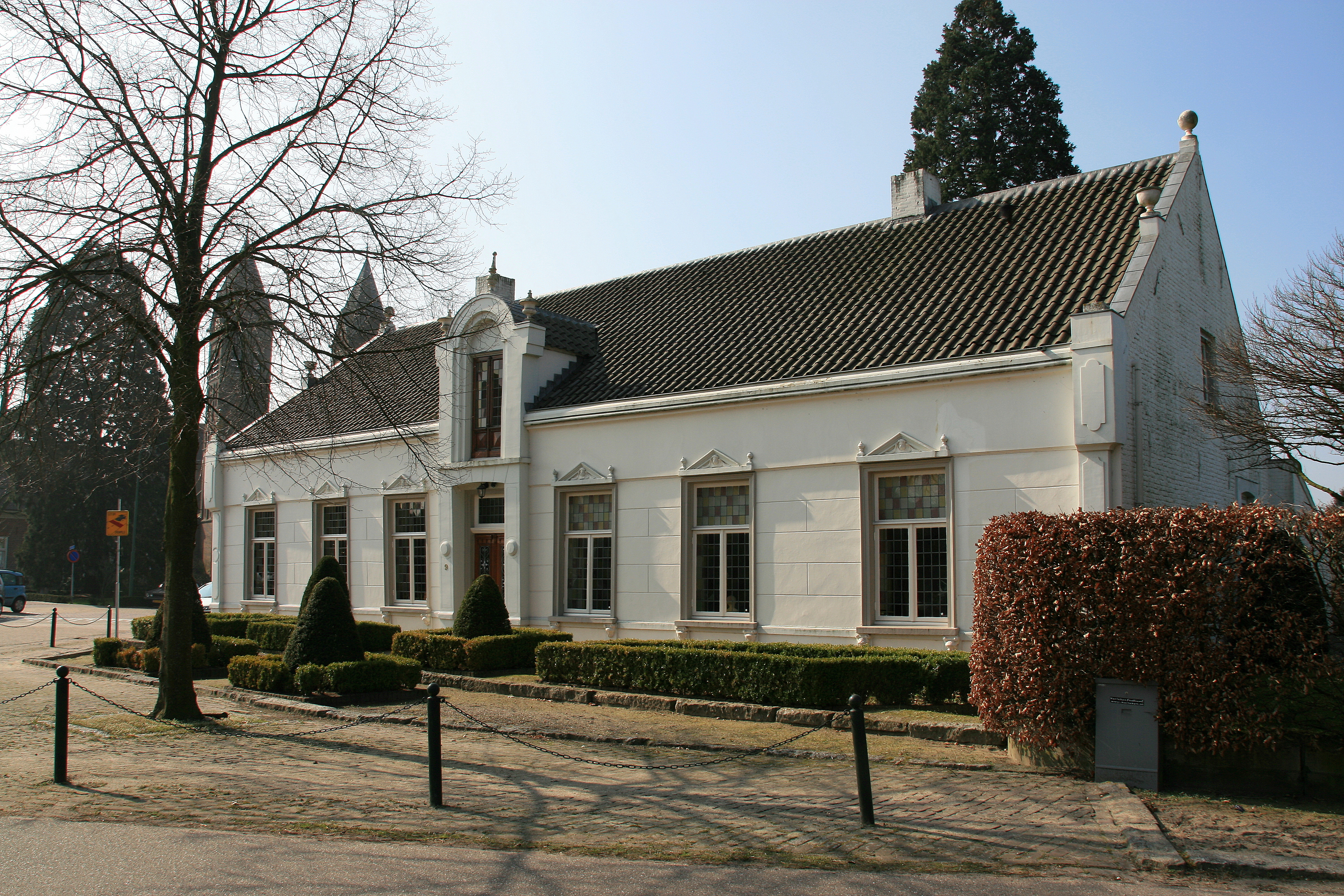
House in Maarheeze

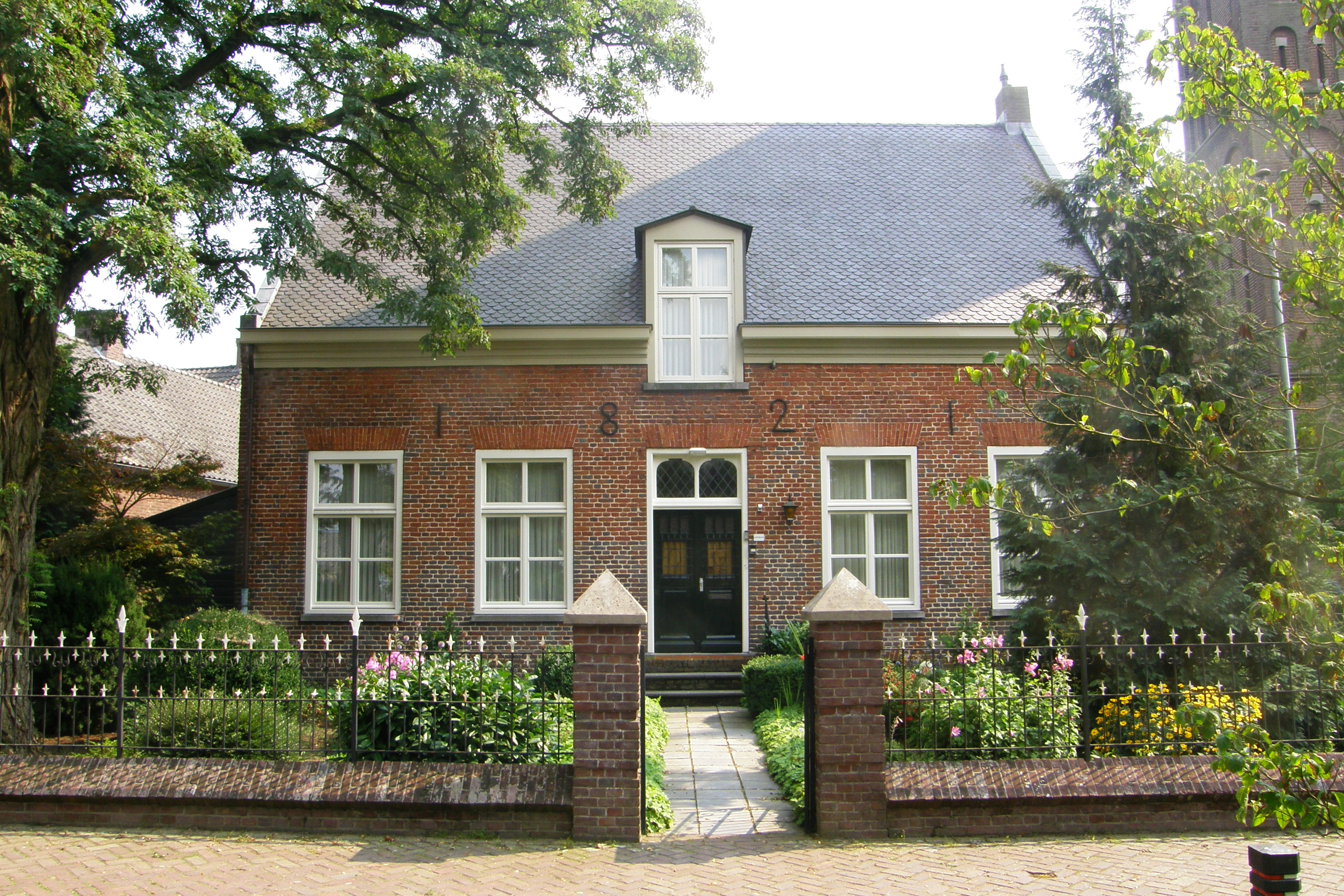
Clergy house

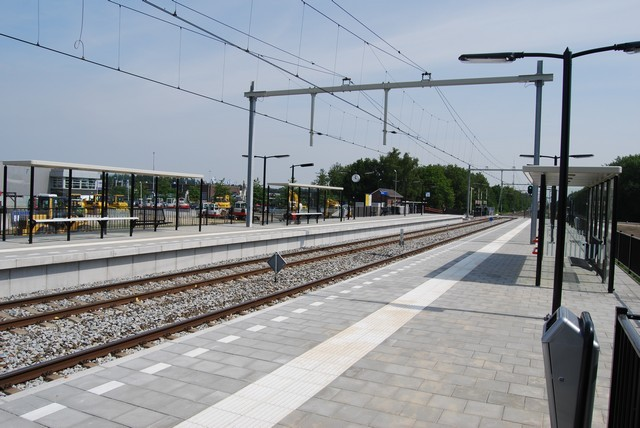
Maarheeze railway station
