= Gastel =

- Village
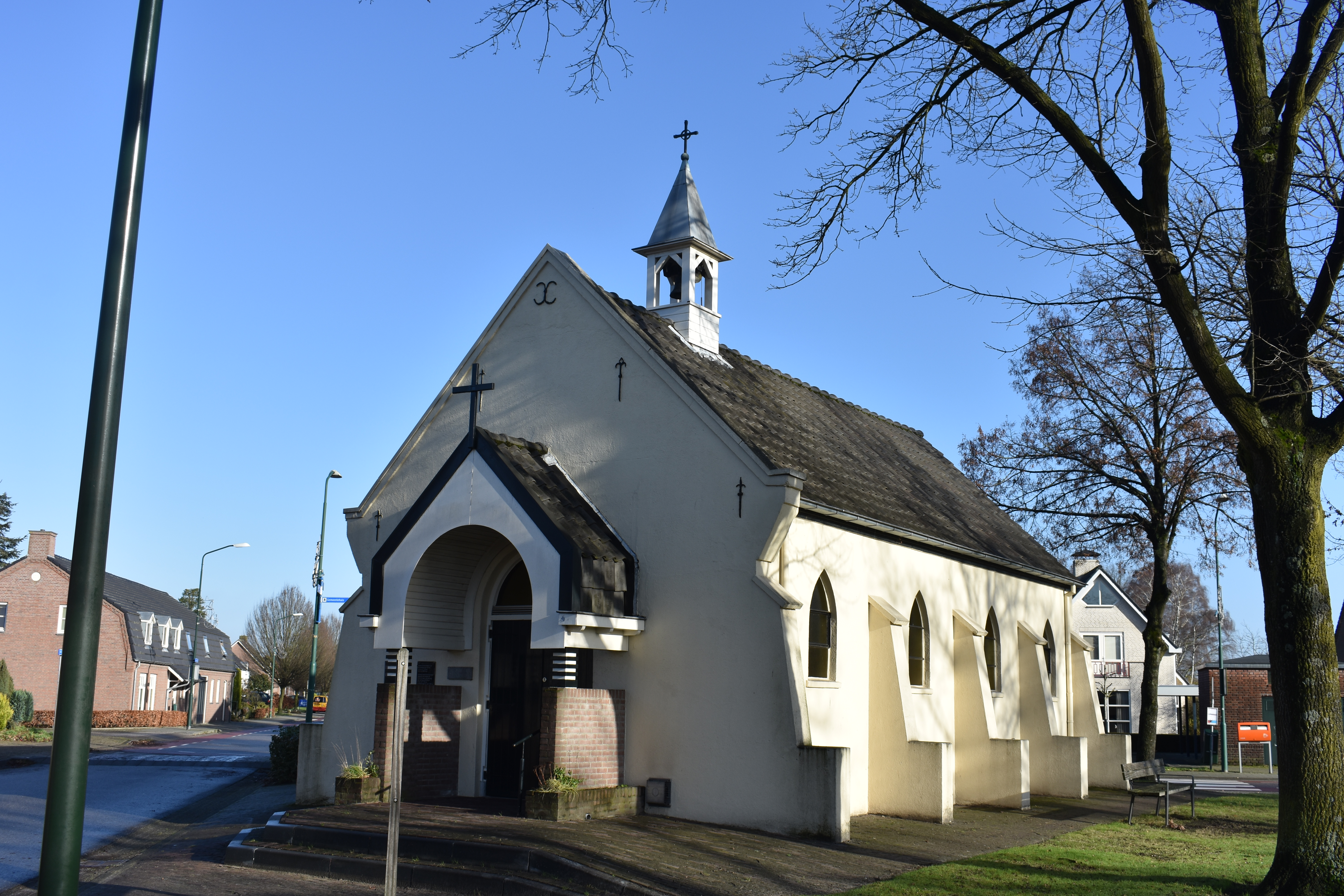
- Cornelius Chapel

- Location in the province of North Brabant in the Netherlands Gastel (Netherlands)
- Coordinates: 51°17′8″N 5°33′14″E
- Country: Netherlands
- Province: North Brabant
- Municipality: Cranendonck

Area
  - Total: 5.92 km^{2} (2.29 sq mi)
- Elevation: 29 m (95 ft)

Population (2021)
  - Total: 760
  - Density: 130/km^{2} (330/sq mi)
- Time zone: UTC+1 (CET)
  - Summer (DST): UTC+2 (CEST)
- Postal code: 6028
- Dialing code: 0495

Gastel is a village in the Dutch province of North Brabant. It is located in the municipality of Cranendonck. In 2020, the village had 744 inhabitants.

== History ==
The village was first mentioned in 1307 as Gherardus de Gastele, and means guesthouse/inn.

Gastel was home to 79 people in 1840. Gastel was a separate municipality until 1821, when it became a part of Soerendonk, Sterksel en Gastel.
