= Cranendonck =

- Municipality
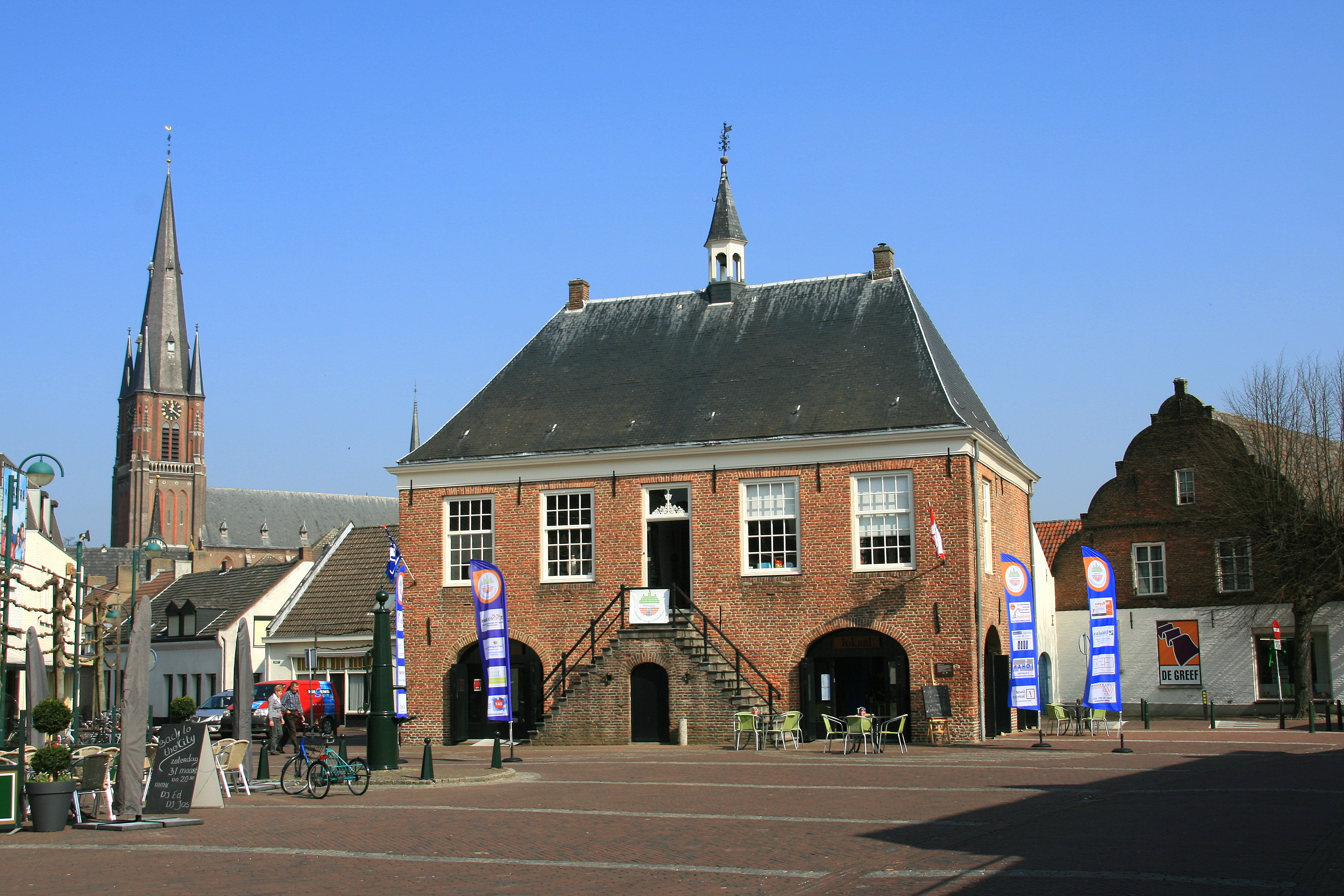
- Former city hall of Budel

- Flag Coat of arms

- Location in North Brabant
- Coordinates: 51°18′N 5°35′E
- Country: Netherlands
- Province: North Brabant
- Established: 1 January 1997

Government
  - Body: Municipal council
  - Mayor: Roland van Kessel (VVD)

Area
  - Total: 78.05 km^{2} (30.14 sq mi)
  - Land: 76.40 km^{2} (29.50 sq mi)
  - Water: 1.65 km^{2} (0.64 sq mi)
- Elevation: 28 m (92 ft)

Population (January 2021)
  - Total: 21,001
  - Density: 275/km^{2} (710/sq mi)
- Time zone: UTC+1 (CET)
  - Summer (DST): UTC+2 (CEST)
- Postcode: 6020–6028
- Area code: 0495
- Website: www.cranendonck.nl

Cranendonck (pronounced [ˈkraːnə(n)dɔŋk]) is a municipality in southern Netherlands. Though located in North Brabant near Eindhoven, the spoken dialect is Budels (linguistically a West Limburgish dialect), rather than Kempenlands (linguistically an East Brabantian dialect).

== Population centres ==
- Budel
- Budel-Dorplein
- Budel-Schoot
- Gastel
- Heikant, Gastel
- Maarheeze
- Soerendonk

=== Topography ===
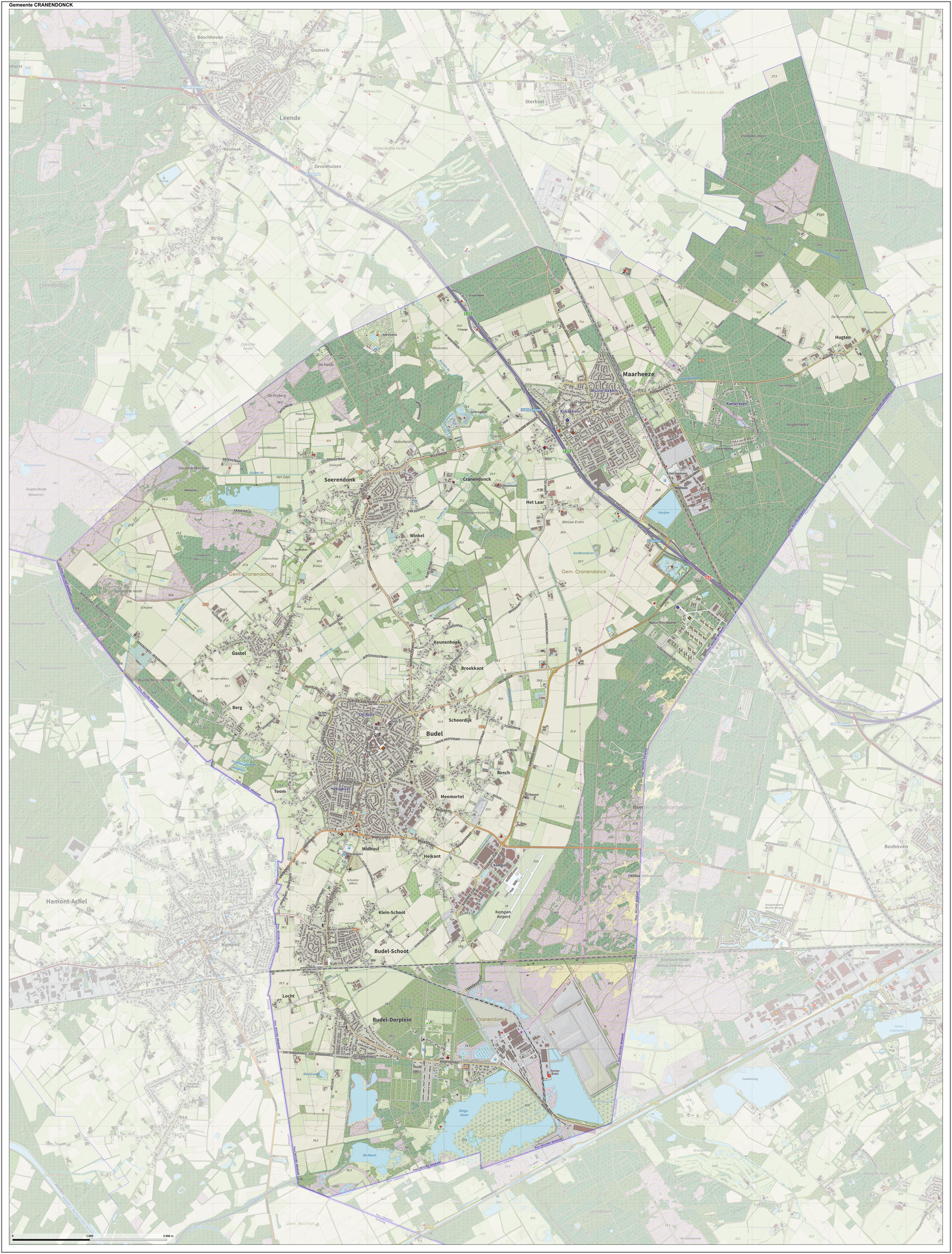

Dutch topographic map of the municipality of Cranendonck, June 2015

== Notable people ==
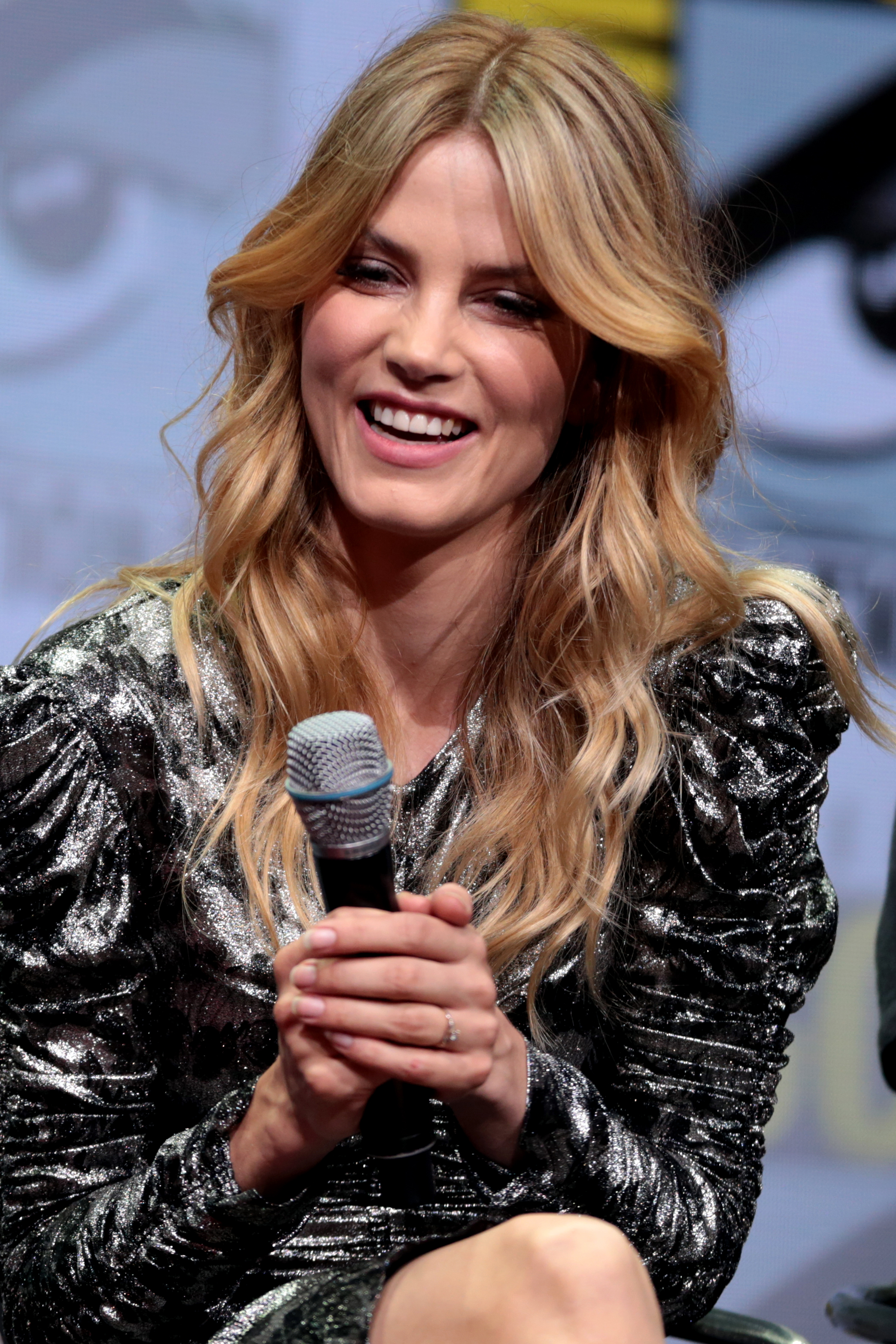
Sylvia Hoeks, 2017

- Antonius Mathijsen (1805 in Budel – 1878) a Dutch army surgeon who first used plaster of Paris
- Hans Teeuwen (born 1967 in Budel) a Dutch comedian, musician, actor and occasional filmmaker
- Sylvia Hoeks (born 1983 in Maarheeze) a Dutch actress and former model

=== Sport ===
- Toine van Mierlo (born 1957 in Soerendonk) a retired Dutch footballer with 230 club caps
- Craig Osaikhwuwuomwan (born 1990 in Budel) a Dutch professional basketball player
- Yvon Beliën (born 1993 in Budel) is a Dutch volleyball player, helped the Netherlands reach their first Olympic semifinals at the 2016 Summer Olympics

== Gallery ==
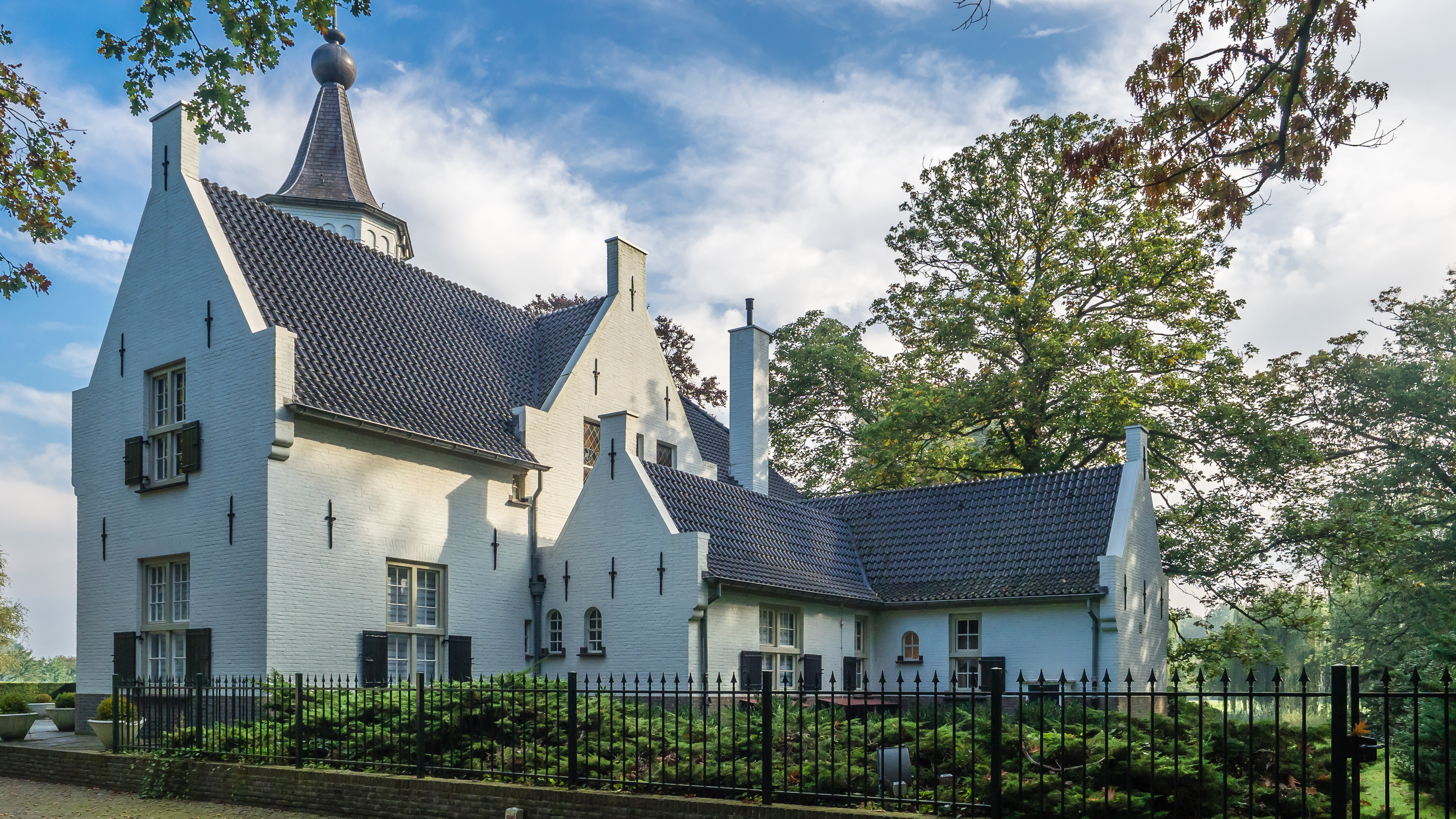
Achterzijde van 'Kasteel' Cranendonck te Soerendonk

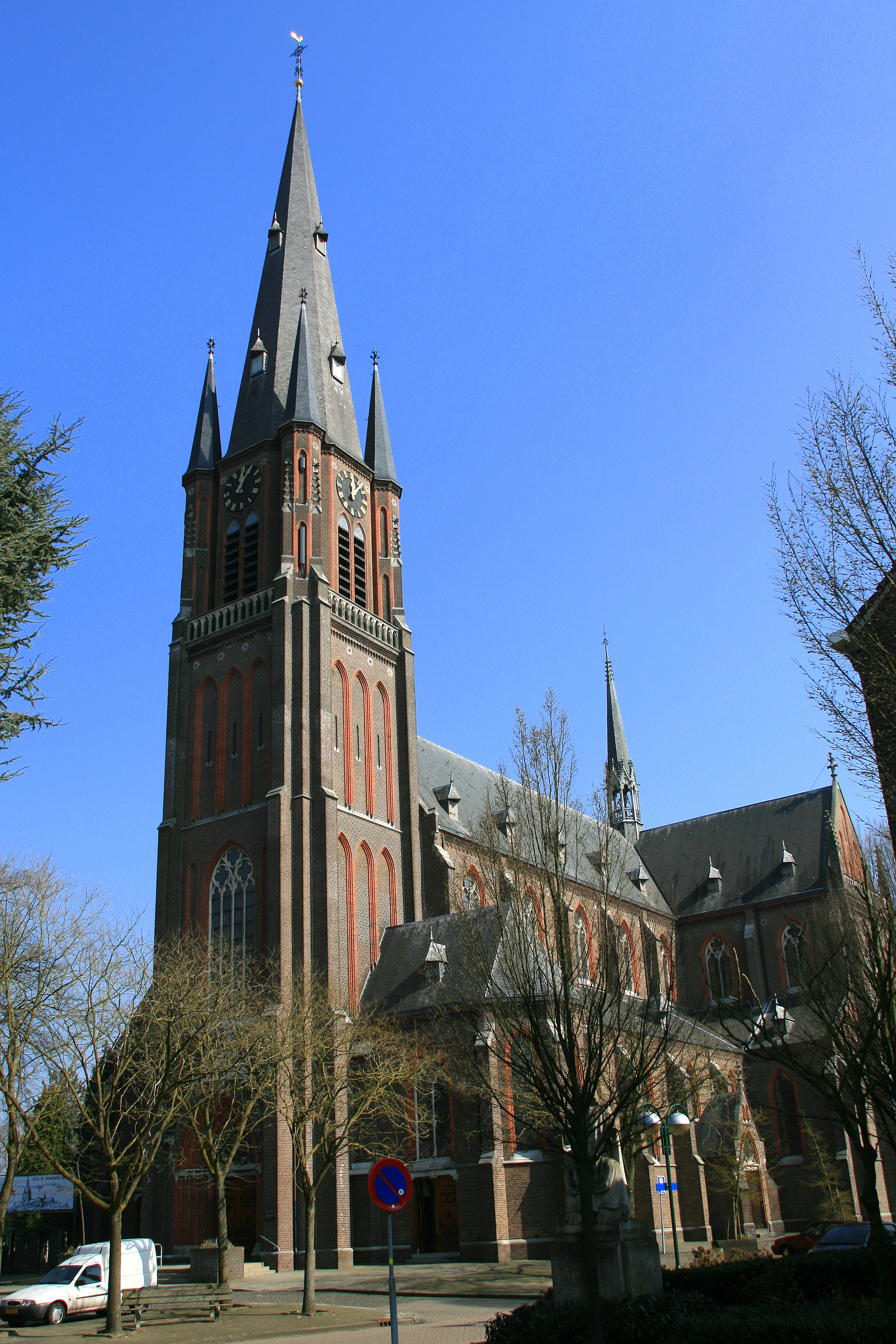
Budel - Kerkstraat, Vrouw Visitatie kerk

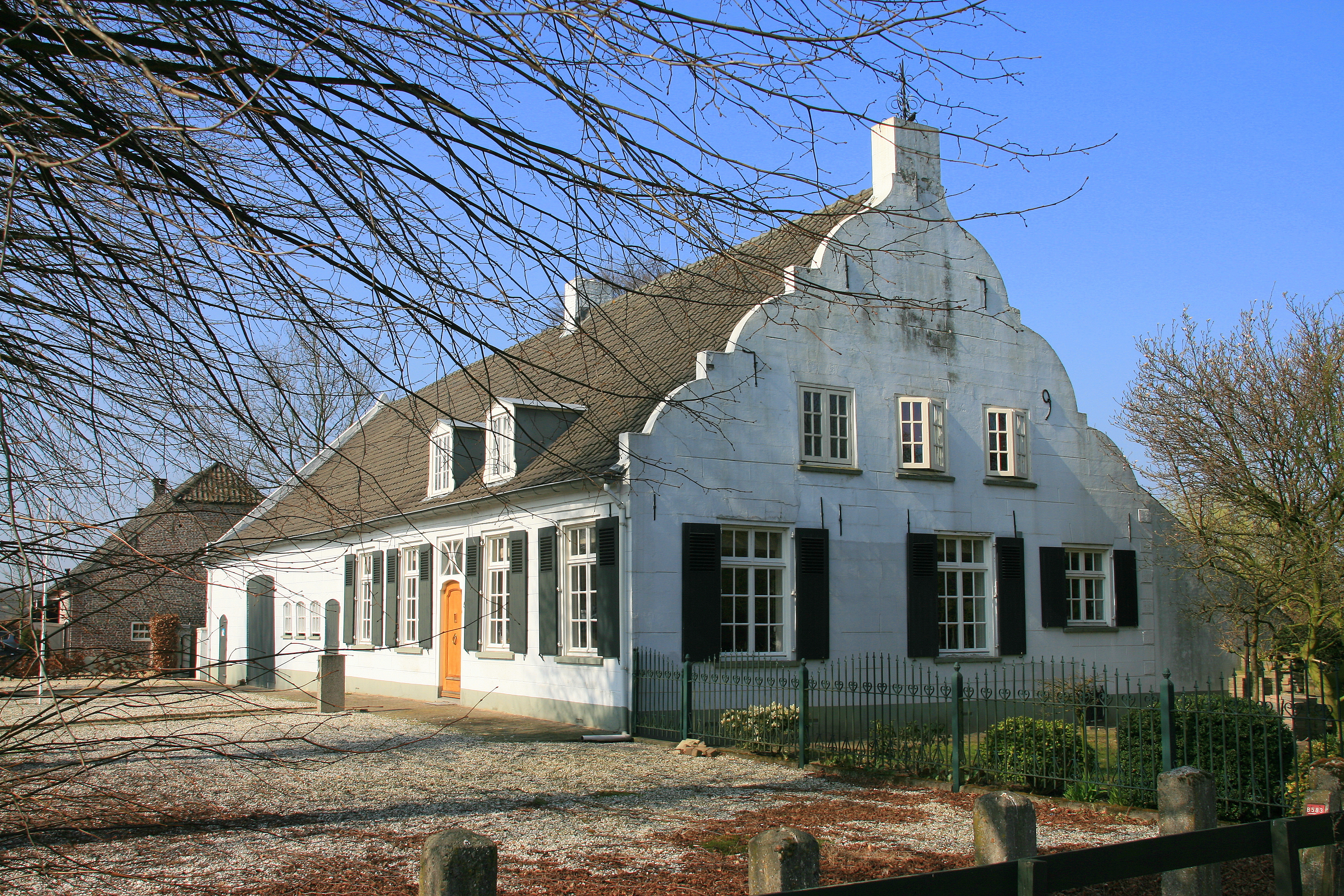
Maarheeze - Kerkstraat - Woonhuis

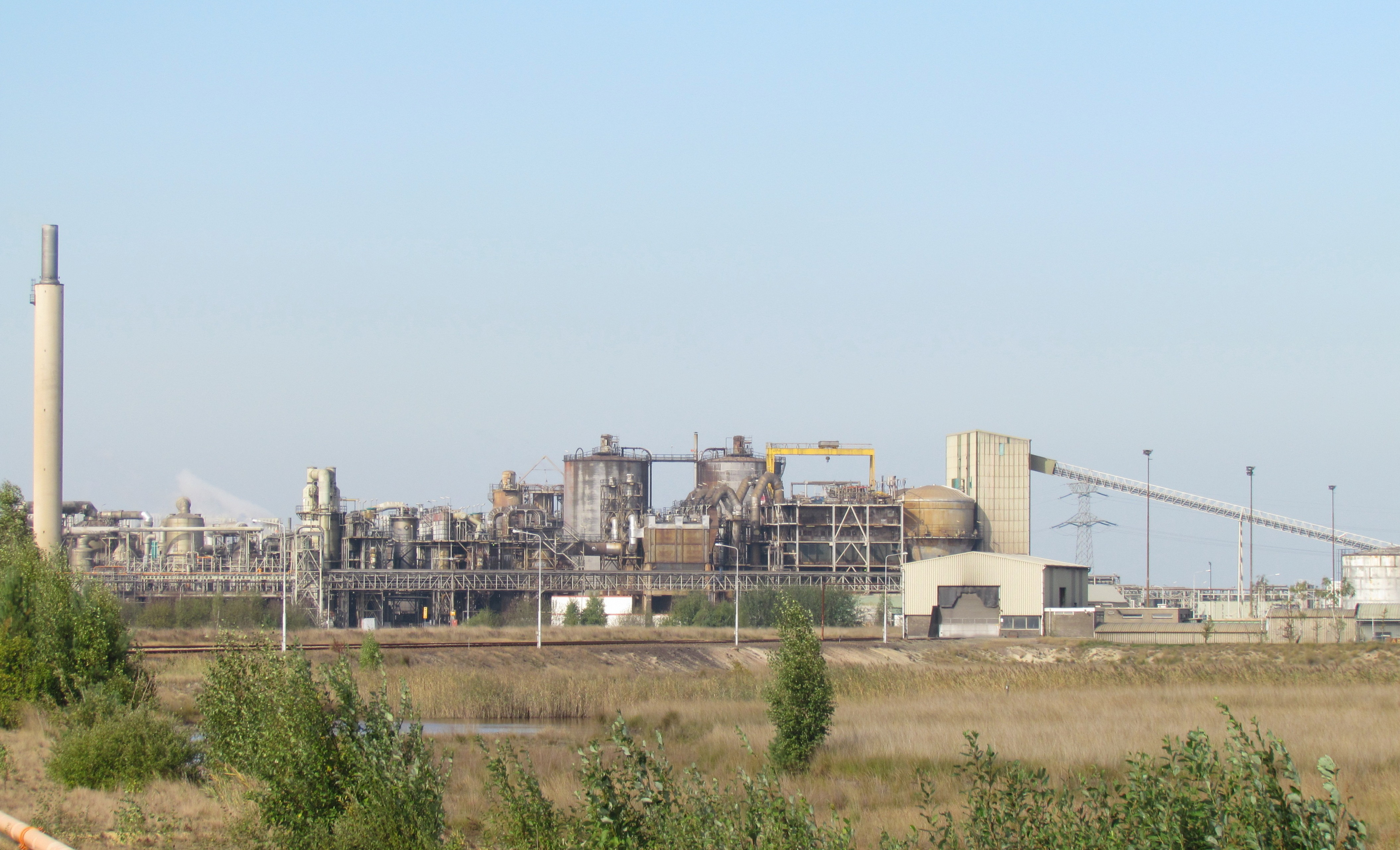
Zinkfabriek Budel
