= Budel =

- Town
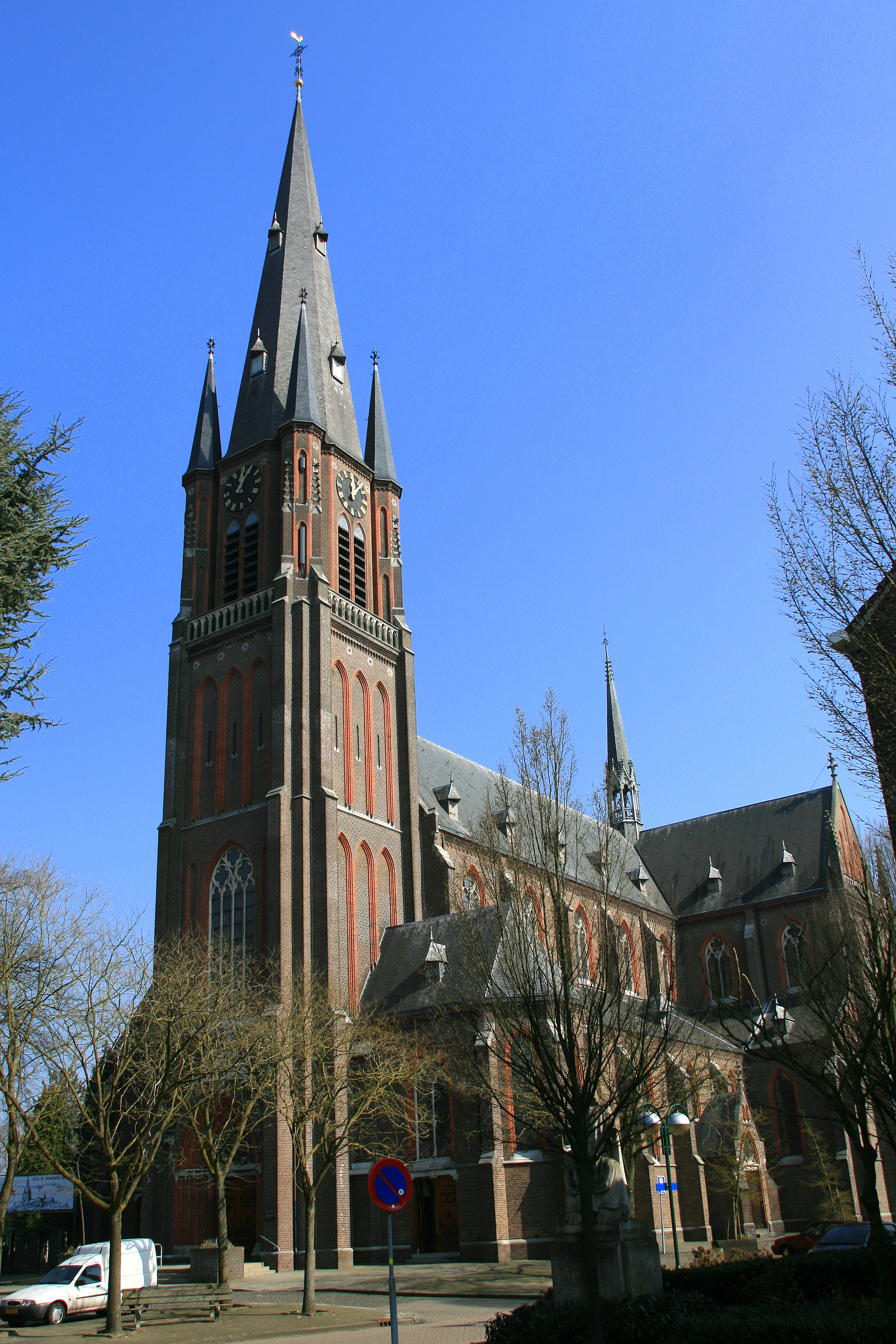
- Church of the Visitation of the Virgin Mary

- Flag Coat of arms

- Location in the province of North Brabant in the Netherlands Budel (Netherlands)
- Coordinates: 51°16′21″N 5°34′28″E
- Country: Netherlands
- Province: North Brabant
- Municipality: Cranendonck

Area
  - Total: 26.16 km^{2} (10.10 sq mi)
- Elevation: 33 m (108 ft)

Population (2021)
  - Total: 9.765
  - Density: 0.3733/km^{2} (0.9668/sq mi)
- Time zone: UTC+1 (CET)
  - Summer (DST): UTC+2 (CEST)
- Postal code: 6021
- Dialing code: 0495

Budel is a town in the Dutch province of North Brabant. It is located in the municipality of Cranendonck, 25 km outside Eindhoven. Kempen Airport is located near Budel.

== History ==
It was first mentioned in 779 as Budilio, and means "place with houses". Budel developed in the Early Middle Ages from a collection of agrarian settlements around the Buulder Aa. In 1421, it became part of the Meierij van 's-Hertogenbosch.

The Catholic Visitation of the Virgin Mary is a basilica-like church built between 1904 and 1912 with a tall tower. The Schepenhuis is located on the main market and was built in 1771. It has been used as town hall, but also as market. In 1981 and 1982, it was restored and returned to its original shape.

The grist mill Nooit Gedagt was built in 1846. The windmill started to be used less during the 1960s. In 1967, however, it was restored and heightened. The windmill is still in use on Saturdays and sometimes during the week.

Budel was home to 440 people in 1840. Budel used to be a separate municipality. It merged with Maarheeze in 1997, and changed its name a year later to Cranendonck. It is home to the Budelse Brouwerij, one of the country's largest microbreweries.

South of the town the large zinc smelter of Nyrstar (named Umicore before 2007) is located.

Though located in North Brabant near Eindhoven, the spoken dialect is Budels (linguistically a Limburgish dialect), rather than Kempenlands (linguistically an East Brabantian dialect).

== Gallery ==
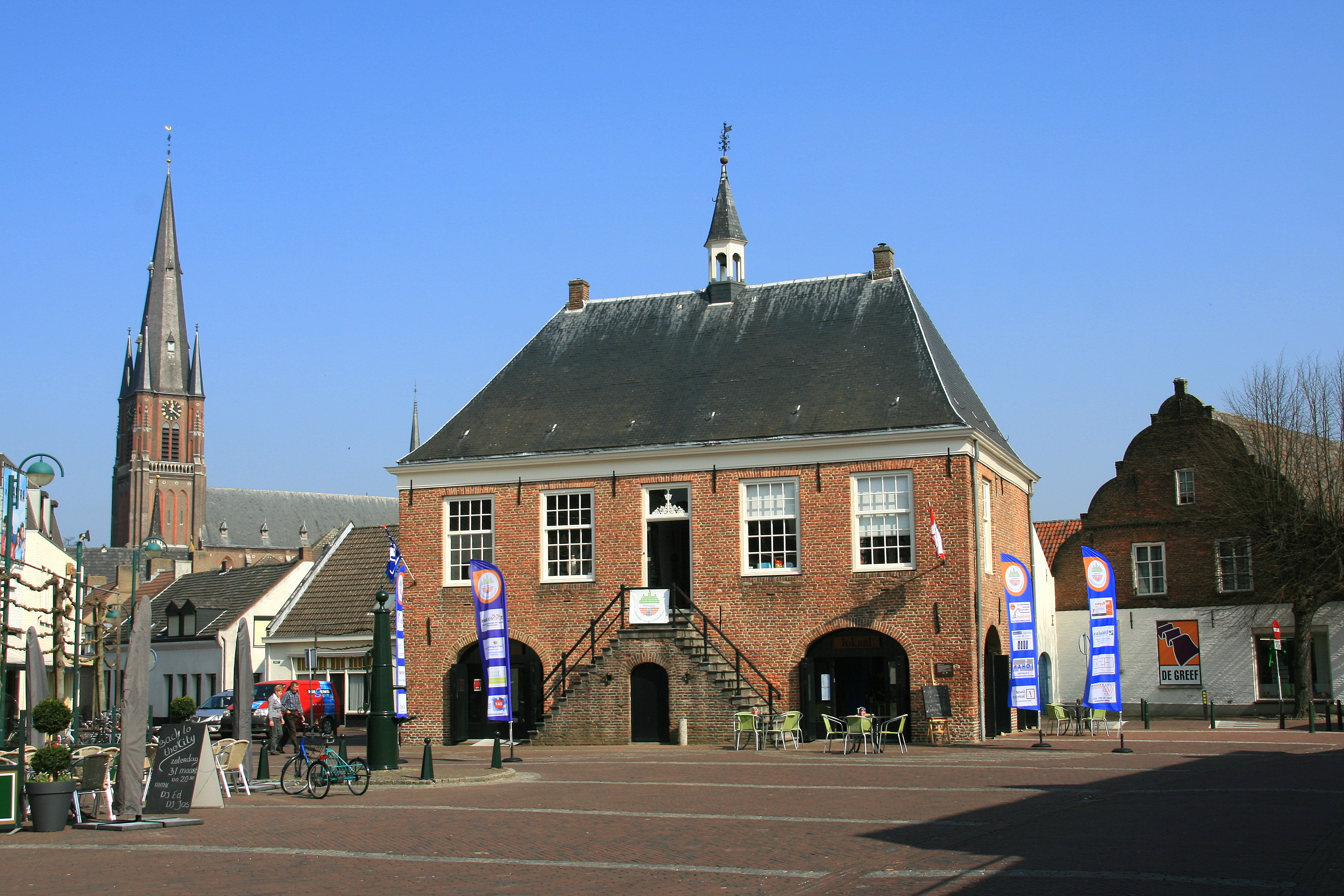
Schepenhuis: the former town hall

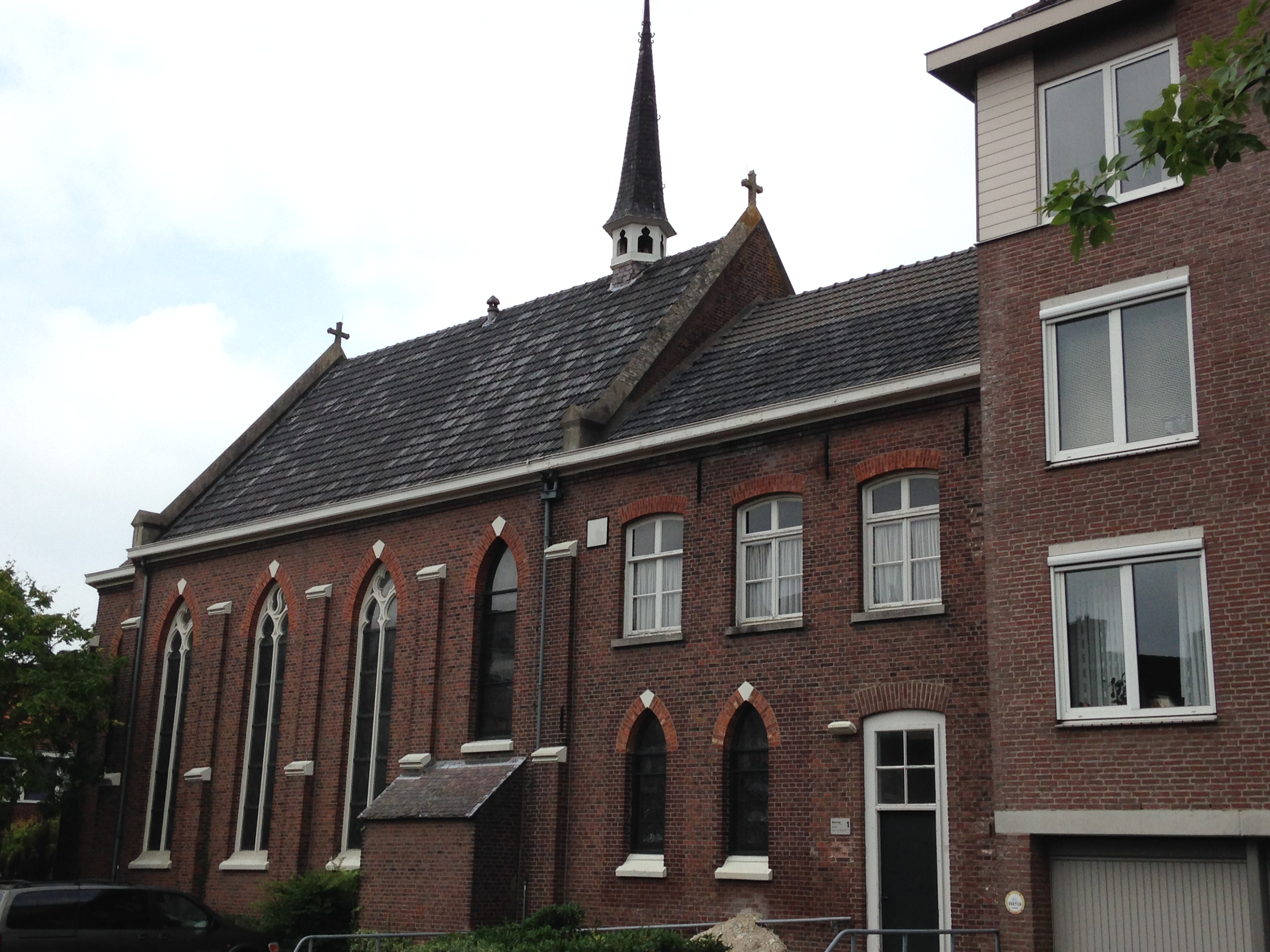
Monastery

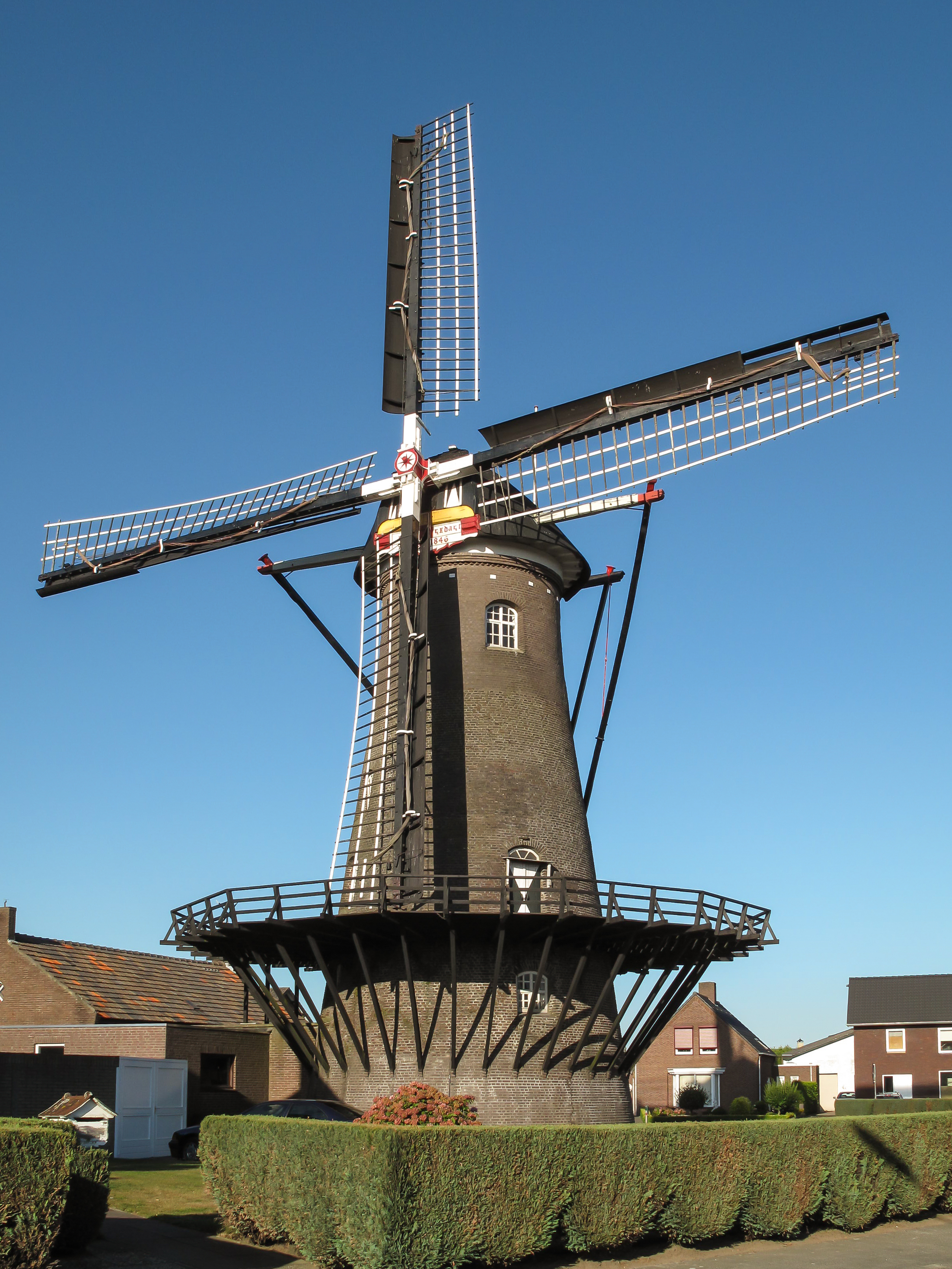
Wind mill Nooitgedagt

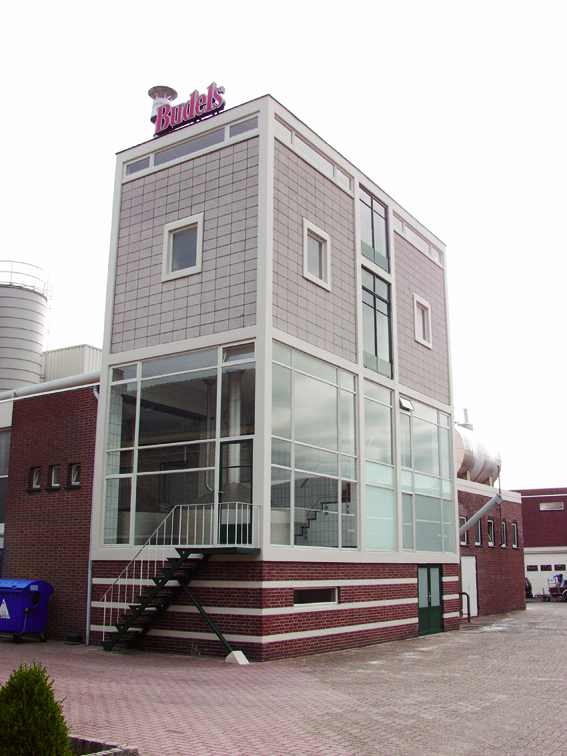
Brewery
