= Mark Rutte =

Secretary General of NATO since 2024

His Excellency Mark Rutte
- Rutte in 2026

14th Secretary General of NATO
- Incumbent
- Assumed office 1 October 2024
- Deputy: Radmila Šekerinska
- Preceded by: Jens Stoltenberg

Prime Minister of the Netherlands
- In office 14 October 2010 – 2 July 2024
- Monarchs: Beatrix; Willem-Alexander
- Deputy: See list: Maxime Verhagen (2010–2012); Lodewijk Asscher (2012–2017); Hugo de Jonge (2017–2022); Kajsa Ollongren (2017–2022); Wopke Hoekstra (2022–2023); Carola Schouten (2017–2024); Sigrid Kaag (2022–2024); Karien van Gennip (2023–2024); Rob Jetten (2024)
- Preceded by: Jan Peter Balkenende
- Succeeded by: Dick Schoof

Leader of the People's Party for Freedom and Democracy
- In office 31 May 2006 – 14 August 2023
- Preceded by: Jozias van Aartsen
- Succeeded by: Dilan Yeşilgöz

State Secretary for Education, Culture and Science
- In office 17 June 2004 – 27 June 2006
- Prime Minister: Jan Peter Balkenende
- Preceded by: Annette Nijs
- Succeeded by: Bruno Bruins

State Secretary for Social Affairs and Employment
- In office 22 July 2002 – 17 June 2004
- Prime Minister: Jan Peter Balkenende
- Preceded by: Hans Hoogervorst
- Succeeded by: Henk van Hoof

Parliamentary leader in the House of Representatives
- In office 18 March 2021 – 10 January 2022
- Preceded by: Klaas Dijkhoff
- Succeeded by: Sophie Hermans
- In office 16 March 2017 – 13 October 2017
- Preceded by: Halbe Zijlstra
- Succeeded by: Halbe Zijlstra
- In office 13 September 2012 – 31 October 2012
- Preceded by: Stef Blok
- Succeeded by: Halbe Zijlstra
- In office 29 June 2006 – 8 October 2010
- Preceded by: Willibrord van Beek
- Succeeded by: Stef Blok
- Parliamentary group: People's Party for Freedom and Democracy

Member of the House of Representatives
- In office 31 March 2021 – 10 January 2022
- In office 23 March 2017 – 26 October 2017
- In office 20 September 2012 – 5 November 2012
- In office 28 June 2006 – 14 October 2010
- In office 30 January 2003 – 27 May 2003

Personal details
- Born: 14 February 1967 (age 59) The Hague, Netherlands
- Party: VVD
- Education: Leiden University: Drs., History

Mark Rutte (Dutch: [ˈmɑr(ə)k ˈrʏtə]; born 14 February 1967) is a Dutch politician who has served as the 14th Secretary General of NATO since October 2024. He previously served as Prime Minister of the Netherlands from 2010 to 2024 and leader of the People's Party for Freedom and Democracy (VVD) from 2006 to 2023. Serving a total of almost 14 years, Rutte is the longest-serving prime minister in Dutch history.

After originally embarking on a business management career working for Unilever, Rutte entered national politics in 2002 as a member of Jan Peter Balkenende's cabinet. Rutte won the 2006 VVD leadership election and led the party to victory in the 2010 general election. After lengthy coalition negotiations, he became prime minister of the Netherlands. He was the first self-described liberal to be appointed prime minister in 92 years.

An impasse on budget negotiations led to his government's early collapse in April 2012, but the VVD's victory in the subsequent election allowed Rutte to return as prime minister to lead his second cabinet between the VVD and the Labour Party (PvdA), which became the first cabinet to complete a full four-year term since 1998. Though the VVD lost seats in the 2017 general election, it remained the largest party. After a record-length formation period, Rutte was appointed to lead his third cabinet between the VVD, Christian Democratic Appeal (CDA), Democrats 66 (D66) and Christian Union (CU).

Though Rutte and his cabinet resigned in response to the Dutch childcare benefits scandal, the VVD would go on to win the 2021 general election. Rutte began his fourth term in 2022 after another record-length formation period. On 7 July 2023, he announced his government's resignation after the cabinet failed to agree on how to handle migration. Rutte IV would continue on as an outgoing cabinet, fulfilling a caretaker function and keeping the nation running until the Schoof cabinet was sworn in on 2 July 2024.

For his ability to remain in office despite various political scandals, Rutte had been referred to as "Teflon Mark" as "nothing ever seemed to stick to him". He has also been described by the Foreign Policy columnist Caroline de Gruyter as ideologically flexible and pragmatic, willing to accommodate a broad range of political factions in order to address issues, while the Guardian correspondent Jon Henley sees in him a "managerial rather than a visionary leader".

== Early life ==
Rutte was born in The Hague, South Holland, Netherlands, to a Dutch Reformed family. He is the youngest child of Izaäk Rutte (5 October 1909 – 22 April 1988), a merchant, and his second wife Hermina Cornelia Dilling (13 November 1923 – 13 May 2020), a secretary. Izaäk Rutte worked for a trading company; first as an importer in the Dutch East Indies; he later ran a car dealership. His second wife was a sister of his first wife, Petronella Hermanna Dilling (17 March 1910 – 20 July 1945), who died while they were interned together in Tjideng, a prisoner-of-war camp in Batavia (present-day Jakarta, Indonesia), during World War II. Rutte has seven siblings as a result of his father's two marriages. One of his elder brothers died from AIDS in the 1980s. Rutte later described the deaths of his brother and his father as events that changed the course of his life.

Rutte attended the Maerlant Lyceum from 1979 until 1985, specialising in the arts. Although his original ambition was to attend a conservatory and become a concert pianist, he instead went to study history at Leiden University, where he graduated in 1992. Rutte combined his studies with a position on the board of the Youth Organisation Freedom and Democracy, the youth organisation of the VVD, and served as chair of the organisation from 1988 to 1991.

After his studies Rutte entered the business world, working as a manager for Unilever and its food subsidiary Calvé. Until 1997, Rutte was part of the human resource department of Unilever, and played a leading role in several reorganisations. Between 1997 and 2000, Rutte was staff manager of the subsidiary Van den Bergh Nederland. In 2000, Rutte became a member of the Corporate Human Resources Group, and in 2002, he became human resource manager for IgloMora Groep, another subsidiary of Unilever.

== Political career ==
Between 1993 and 1997, Rutte was a member of the national board of the VVD. Rutte served as State Secretary (i.e. Deputy Minister) at the Social Affairs and Employment Ministry from 22 July 2002 to 17 June 2004 in the First and Second Balkenende cabinets and was responsible for fields including bijstand (municipal welfare) and arbeidsomstandigheden (Occupational safety and health). After the 2003 elections Rutte was briefly also a member of the House of Representatives, from 30 January to 27 May 2003.

In 2003, Rutte supported the US-led invasion of Iraq.

During his time as State Secretary in 2003, Rutte advised municipalities to check Somali residents for social assistance fraud, after a number of Somalis who were working in England were found to be receiving social assistance benefits in the Netherlands as well. A Somali man entitled to benefits was stopped by social investigators and checked for fraud on the basis of his external characteristics, after which he refused the investigators access to his home. The Municipal Executive (College van burgemeester en wethouders) of Haarlem decided to withdraw his right to social benefits. He disagreed with this and his appeal was upheld by the administrative judge. The court ruled that "an investigation aimed exclusively at persons of Somali descent is discriminatory" and contrary to the Constitution because this distinction is "discrimination based on race". Rutte rejected the criticism, stating that a change in the law would then be necessary to be able to combat targeted fraud.

Rutte later served as State Secretary for Higher Education and Science within the Education, Culture and Science Ministry in the Second Balkenende Cabinet from 17 June 2004 to 27 June 2006, replacing Annette Nijs. In office, Rutte showed particular interest in making the Dutch higher education system more competitive internationally, by trying to make it more market oriented (improving the position of students as consumers in the market for education). Rutte resigned from his position in government in June 2006 to return to the House of Representatives, and he soon became the parliamentary leader of the VVD.

=== Party leadership election ===
After the resignation of Jozias van Aartsen and a loss in the 2006 Dutch municipal election, the VVD held an internal election for a new Lead Candidate, in which Rutte competed against Rita Verdonk and Jelleke Veenendaal. On 31 May 2006, it was announced that Mark Rutte would be the next lijsttrekker of the VVD. He was elected by 51.5% of party members.

=== 2006 general election ===
For the 2006 general election, the VVD campaign with Rutte as leader did not get off to a good start; he received criticism from within his own party. Rutte was said to be overshadowed by his own party members Rita Verdonk and Gerrit Zalm, as well as being unable to penetrate between Wouter Bos and Jan Peter Balkenende, who were generally seen as the prime candidates to become the next prime minister. On 27 November, it became known that Rita Verdonk, who generally held a more populist view on politics, managed to obtain more votes than Mark Rutte; he obtained 553,200 votes against Verdonk's 620,555. After repeated criticisms by Verdonk on VVD policy, Rutte expelled her from the party's parliamentary group on 13 September 2007.

=== 2010 general election ===
In the 2010 general election, Rutte was once again the lead candidate for the VVD. It won 31 seats and, for the first time ever, became the largest party in the House of Representatives. The lengthy 2010 cabinet formation followed, with several personalities succeeding each other, being appointed by Queen Beatrix in order to find out what coalition could be formed. Efforts to form a broad spectrum coalition between the VVD, CDA and PvdA failed. Instead, the only possibility appeared to be a centre-right coalition of liberals and the Christian Democratic Appeal (CDA), with the outside support of the Party for Freedom (PVV), led by Geert Wilders.

== Prime Minister of the Netherlands ==
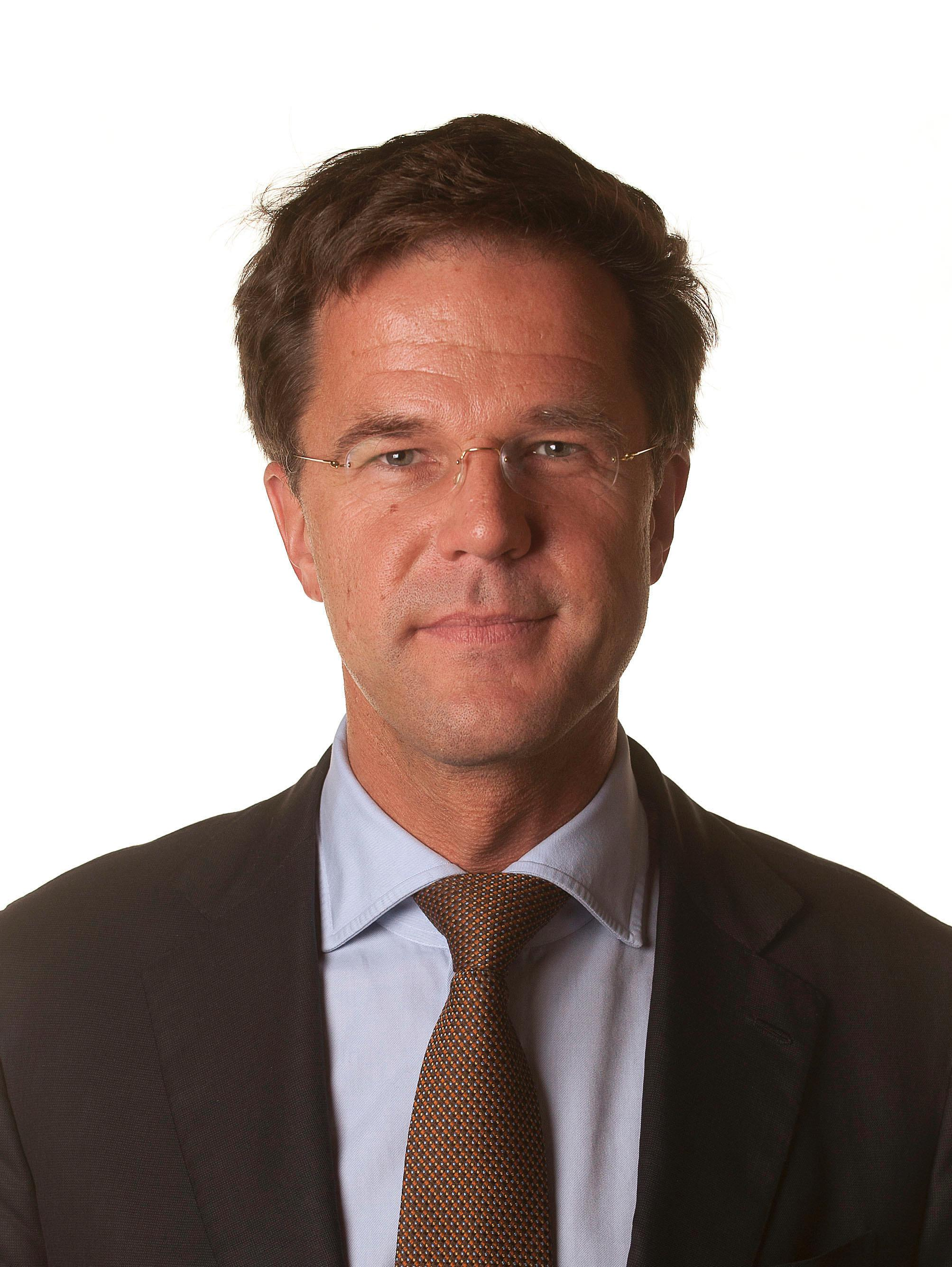
- Official portrait, 2010
- Premiership of Mark Rutte; 14 October 2010 – 2 July 2024
- Prime Minister: Mark Rutte
- Cabinet: First Rutte cabinet; Second Rutte cabinet; Third Rutte cabinet; Fourth Rutte cabinet
- Party: People's Party for Freedom and Democracy
- Election: 2010, 2012, 2017, 2021
- Appointed by: Beatrix of the Netherlands; Willem-Alexander of the Netherlands
- Seat: Torentje

=== First term ===
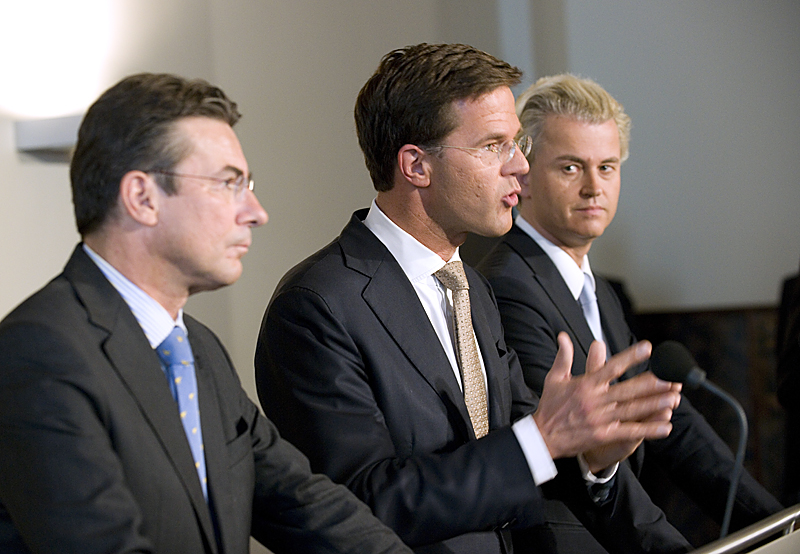
Rutte presenting his first cabinet together with Deputy Prime Minister Maxime Verhagen (CDA) and coalition partner Geert Wilders (PVV)

After securing support for a coalition between the VVD and CDA, Rutte was appointed as formateur on 8 October 2010; Rutte announced his prospective cabinet, including Maxime Verhagen from the CDA as deputy prime minister. On 14 October, Queen Beatrix formally invited Rutte to form a government, and later that day, Rutte presented his first cabinet to Parliament. The government was confirmed in office by a majority of one, and Rutte was sworn in as Prime Minister of the Netherlands, becoming the first Liberal to serve in the role since Pieter Cort van der Linden in 1918. At 43 years old, he also became the second-youngest prime minister in Dutch history, after Ruud Lubbers.

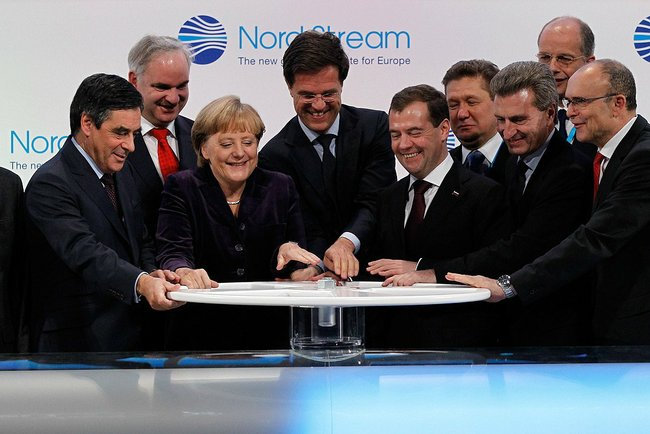
Nord Stream 1 opening ceremony on 8 November 2011 with Rutte, German Chancellor Angela Merkel, Russian president Dmitry Medvedev and French prime minister François Fillon

After a victory in the 2011 provincial elections, the VVD secured its status as the lead party within the government. In March 2012, seeking to comply with requirements from the European Union to reduce the nation's deficit, Rutte began talks with his coalition partners on a budget which would cut 16 billion euros of government spending. However, PVV leader Geert Wilders withdrew his party's informal support from the government on 21 April, stating that the proposed budget would hurt economic growth. This led to the early collapse of the government and Rutte submitting his resignation to Queen Beatrix on the afternoon of 23 April. His government had lasted for 558 days, making it one of the shortest Dutch cabinets since World War II.

=== Second term ===
Ahead of the 2012 general election, Rutte was named the VVD's lead candidate for the third time. At the election in September, the VVD won an additional 10 seats, remaining the largest party in the House of Representatives; the CDA and PVV saw their number of seats fall significantly. The VVD quickly negotiated a coalition agreement with the Labour Party and Rutte returned as prime minister of the Second Rutte cabinet on 5 November 2012.

In 2014, The Hague hosted a Group of Seven special meeting after the Russian annexation of Crimea.

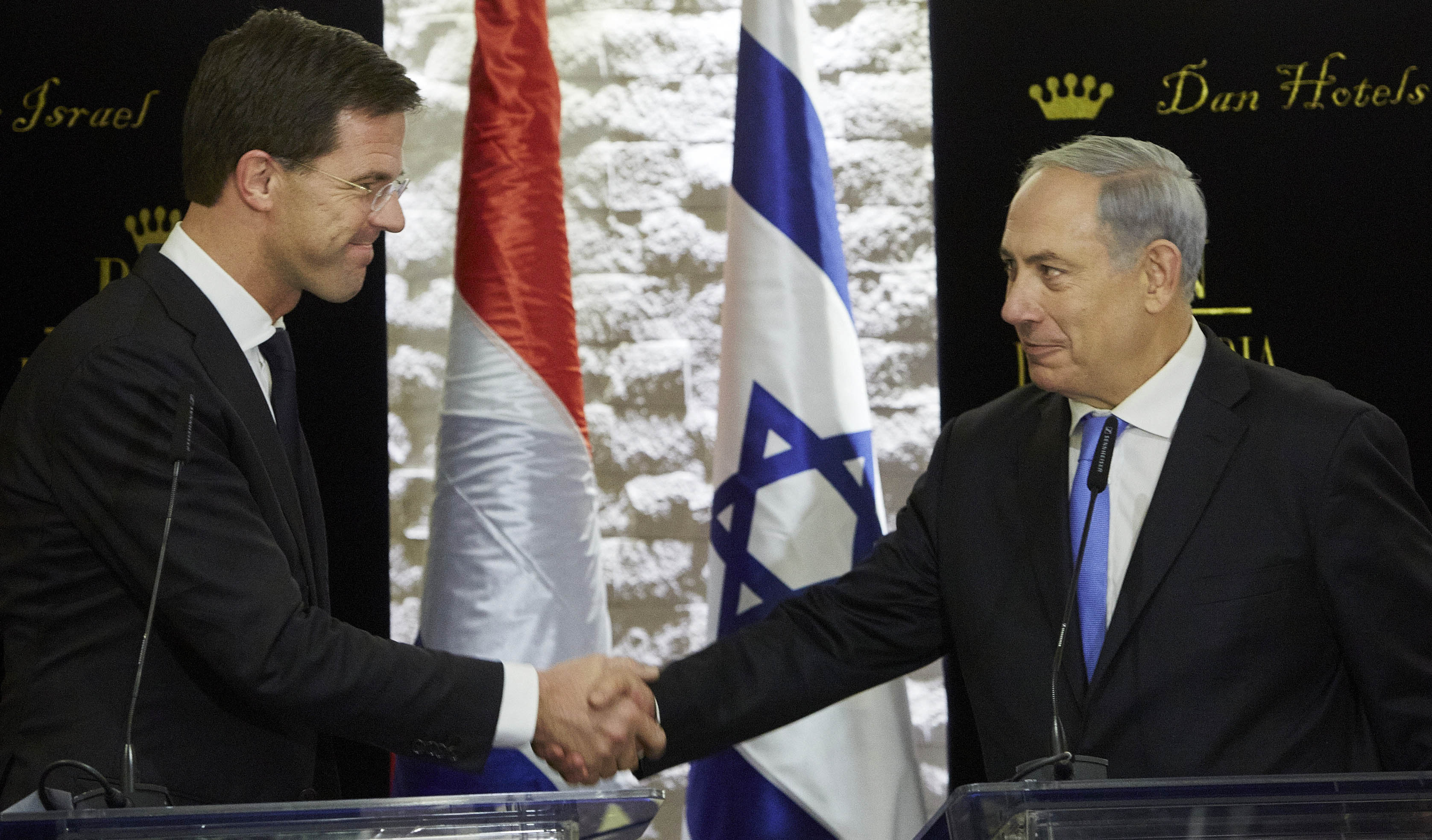
Rutte with Israeli prime minister Benjamin Netanyahu, 8 December 2013

In April 2016, Rutte was appointed by United Nations Secretary-General Ban Ki-moon and President of the World Bank Group Jim Yong Kim to the High-Level Panel on Water. Co-chaired by Mauritius President Ameenah Gurib and Mexican president Enrique Peña Nieto, the joint UN-WBG panel was set up to accelerate the implementation of Sustainable Development Goal 6 (SDG 6). That month also saw the controversial 2016 Dutch Ukraine–European Union Association Agreement referendum, which resulted in a rejection. In November 2016 the House of Representatives approved a ban on the Islamic burqa in some public spaces including schools and hospitals by 132 votes against 18, which the VVD supported.

Rutte's second cabinet completed its full four-year term without collapsing or losing a vote of no confidence, becoming the first cabinet to do so since the First Kok cabinet, which lasted from 1994 to 1998.

=== Third term ===
The VVD went into the 2017 general election with a small lead over the PVV in most opinion polls. Rutte was judged to have managed the 2017 Dutch–Turkish diplomatic incident well according to similar polling. While the VVD lost 8 seats in the general election, the PvdA lost 29, and these seats were split between a number of other parties, leaving the VVD as the largest party in parliament for the third successive election. After holding coalition discussions, Rutte negotiated a grand coalition with the CDA, D66 and CU; he presented his third cabinet on 26 October 2017 and was sworn in as prime minister for a third term. The 225 days between the general election and the installation of the third Rutte cabinet was the longest such period in Dutch history.

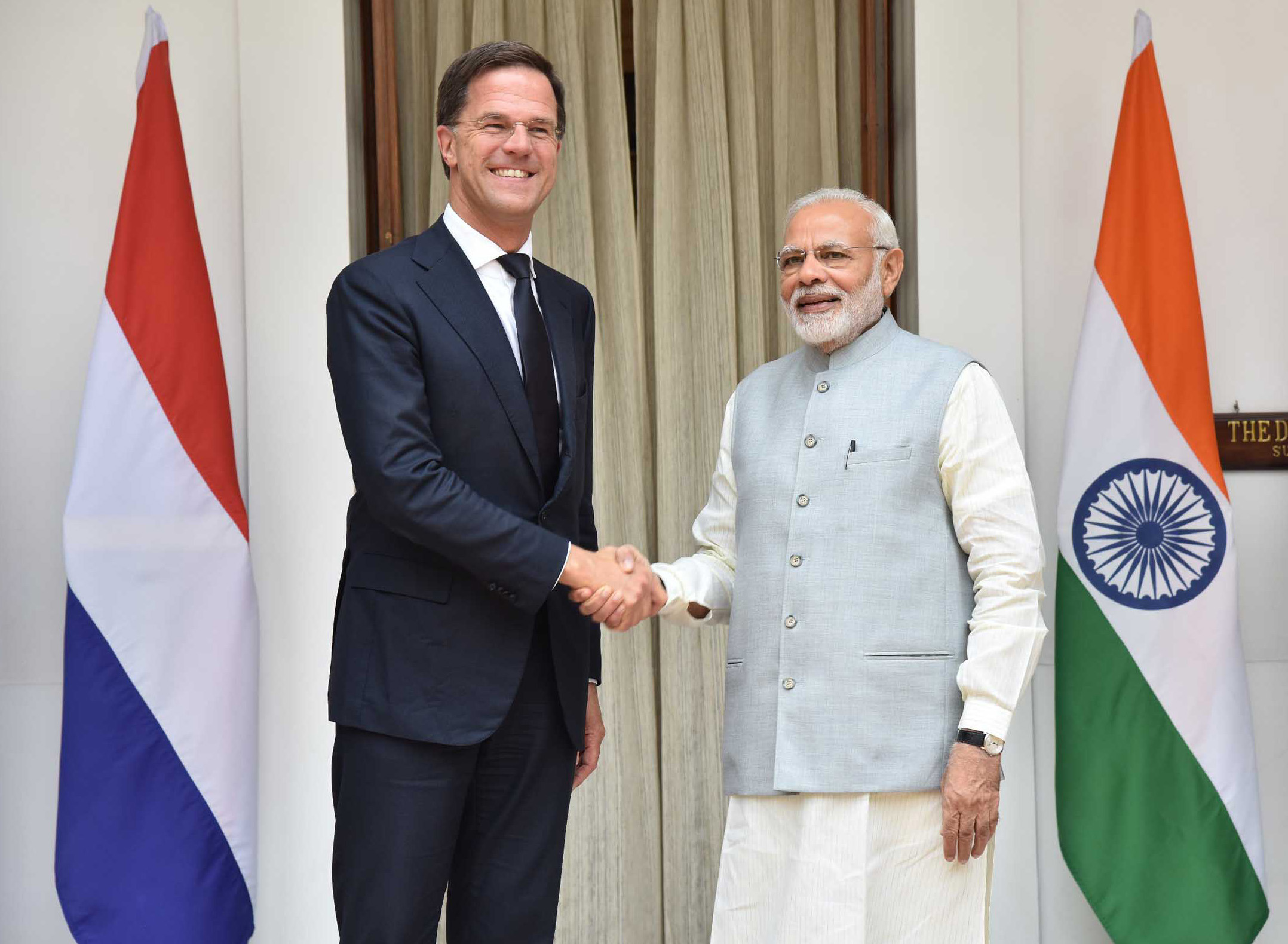
Rutte with Indian prime minister Narendra Modi, 24 May 2018

The coalition agreement contained a plan to abolish the 15% dividend tax (providing the state €1.4 billion per year), which proved highly unpopular as it had not been mentioned in any of the coalition party's programs, and it later appeared that major Dutch companies like Shell and Unilever had secretly been lobbying for the inclusion of this measure.

On 21 March 2018, the Dutch Intelligence and Security Services Act referendum was held, which resulted in a rejection. In July of that same year, Rutte became a topic in international news by interrupting and explicitly contradicting the American president Donald Trump during a meeting with the press at the Oval Office in the White House, which was considered to be "typical Dutch bluntness". At the 2019 provincial elections, Rutte's VVD suffered a blow following the victory of right-wing populist newcomer Forum for Democracy (FvD).

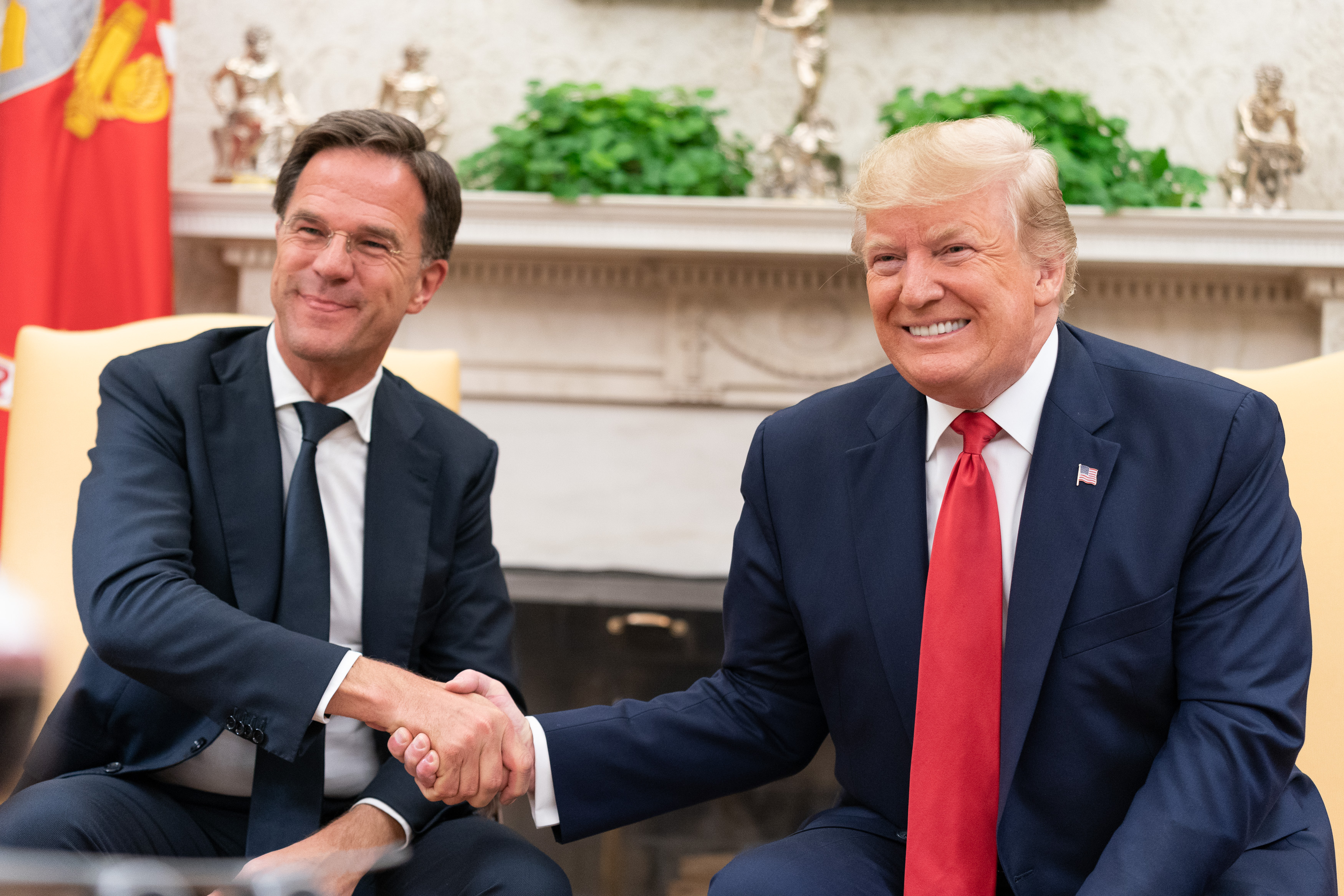
Rutte with U.S. president Donald Trump in the Oval Office of the White House on 18 July 2019

During the negotiations for the COVID-19 recovery fund in the European Union in 2020, Rutte was considered the unofficial leader of the Frugal Four, demanding loans instead of grants and more conditions on them. In September of that year, Rutte suggested that the EU could be dissolved and re-formed without Poland and Hungary, as he perceived these countries' governments to be dismantling the rule of law.

On 15 January 2021, the third Rutte cabinet collectively resigned after the publication of research centered around the childcare subsidies scandal in the Netherlands. Rutte offered his resignation to King Willem-Alexander, accepting responsibility for the scandal.

=== Fourth term ===
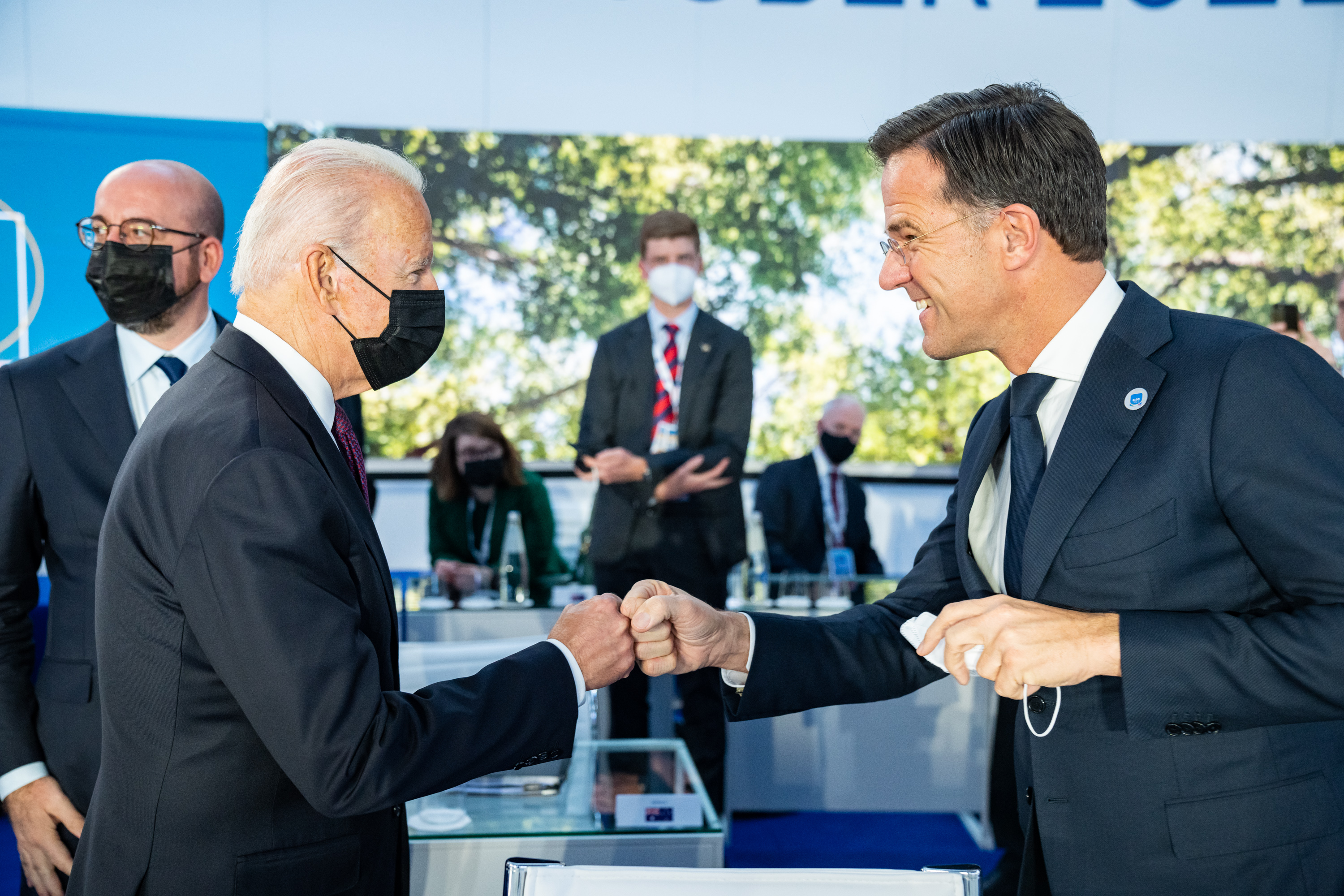
Rutte and U.S. president Joe Biden at the G20 Rome summit, 31 October 2021

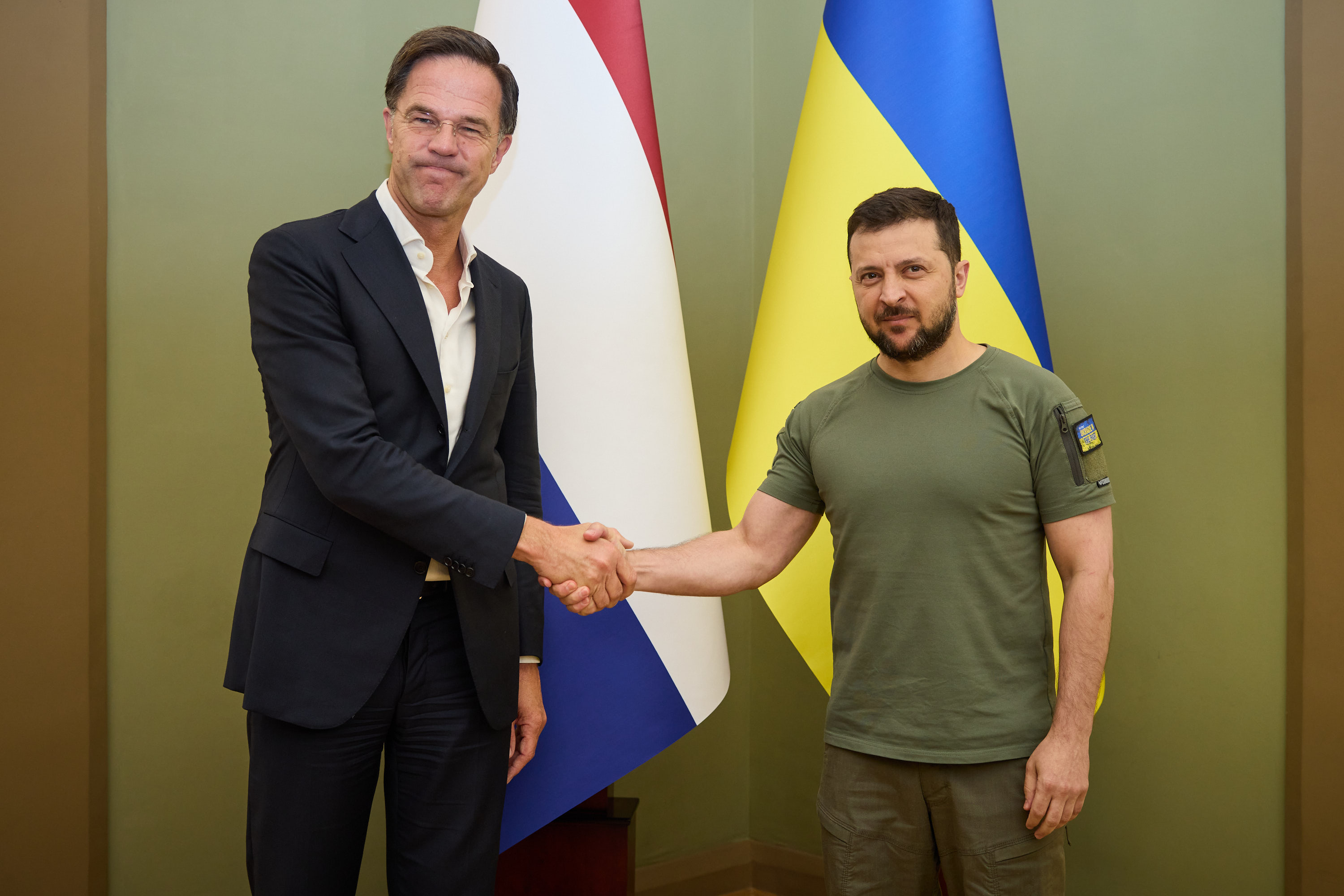
Rutte with Ukrainian president Volodymyr Zelenskyy, 11 July 2022

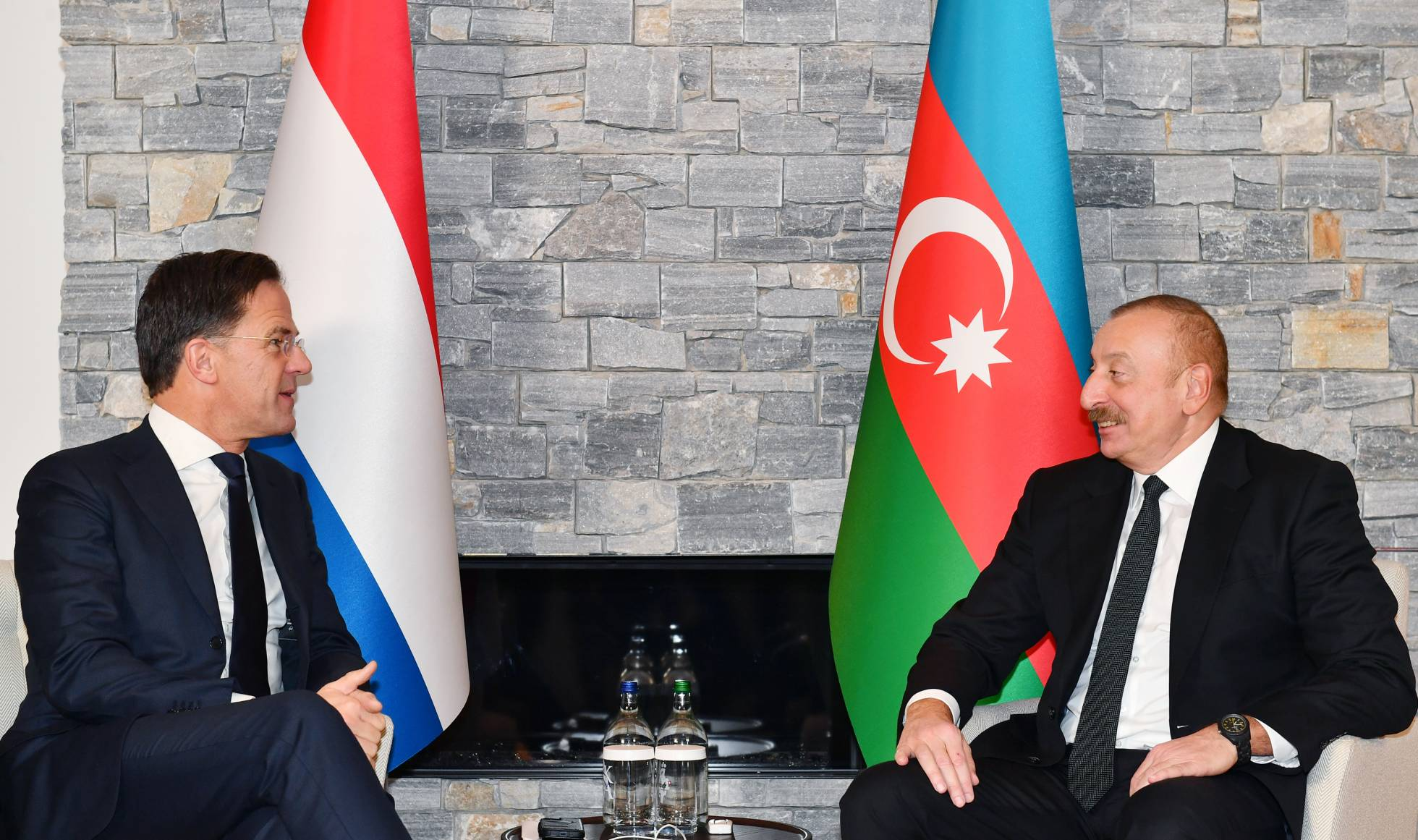
Rutte with Azerbaijani President Ilham Aliyev, 19 January 2023

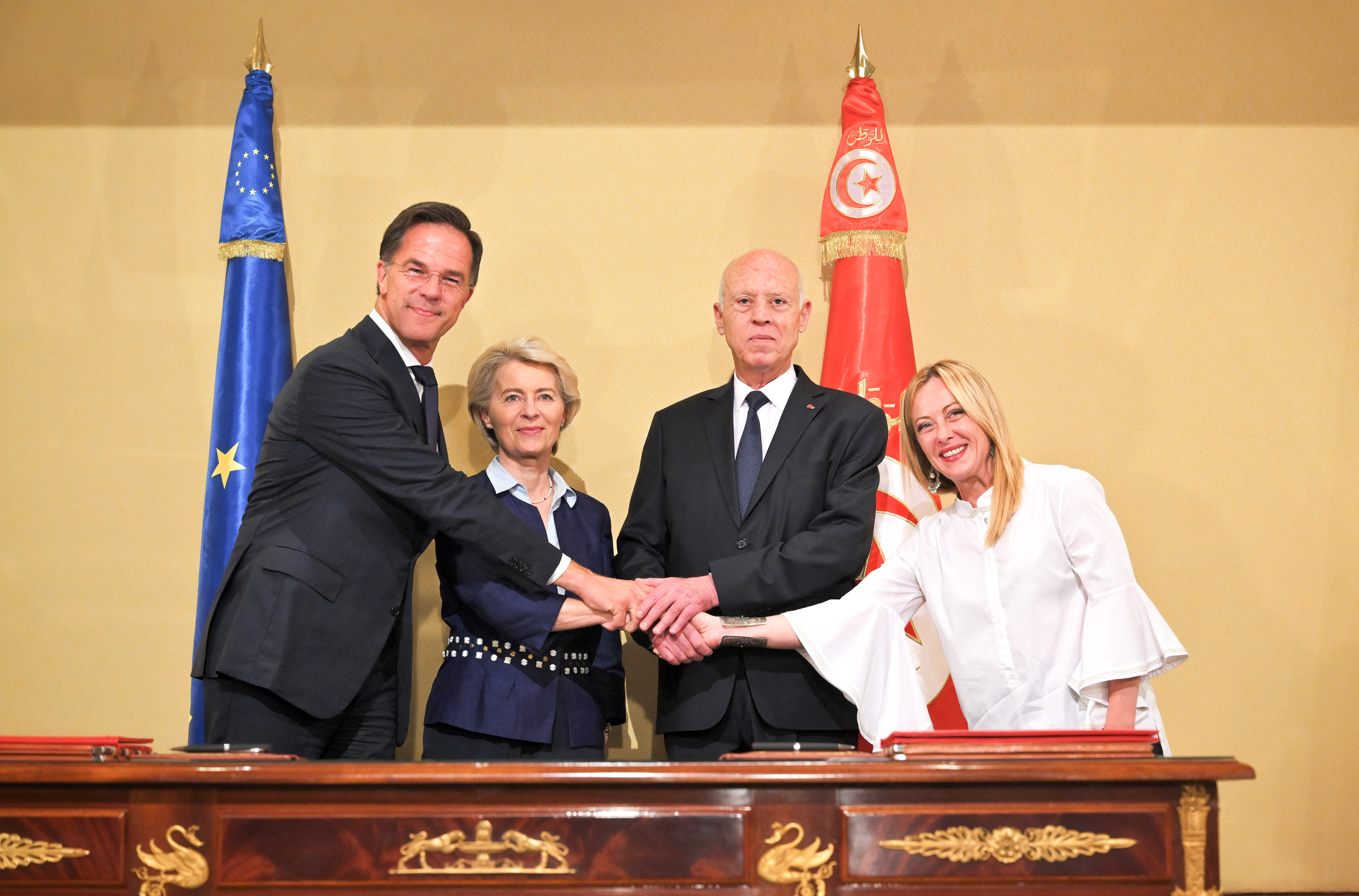
Rutte with European Commission President Ursula von der Leyen, Italian prime minister Giorgia Meloni and Tunisian president Kais Saied, 16 July 2023

Following the 2021 Dutch general election, Rutte's VVD party held 34 of 150 seats and was expected to form a new coalition government. After remaining as outgoing prime minister for the duration of the longest formation process in Dutch history he presented a coalition agreement with D66, CDA and CU, the same combination as his previous government, on 15 December 2021.

In October 2022, Rutte said that alleged war crimes and human rights violations committed during the Armenian-Azerbaijani war in Nagorno-Karabakh should be investigated.

Rutte suffered a political scandal (Nokiagate) during his fourth term, when it was found that he had been deleting the majority of the SMS text messages on his archaic Nokia mobile phone for years, personally judging which messages were to be archived and which messages were to be deleted, a direct violation of the archival law. He explained that this was necessary due to his phone memory filling up too quickly, which was not considered a plausible excuse by other ministers. The scandal also damaged his campaign promises and the coalition accords, which stated that the cabinet wished to restore peoples faith in politics, create a new governance culture and "improve the information provided to the House". The latter of these concerned measures including a modernisation of the archival law and faster information availability.

In January 2023, the U.S., Japan, and the Netherlands reached an agreement to limit certain advanced chip exports to China. Accordingly, the Dutch government placed restrictions on chip exports in March 2023 in order to protect national security. This measure affected the Dutch multinational ASML, one of the most important companies in the global microchip supply chain. In January 2024, the Dutch government placed further restrictions on the shipment of some advanced chip-making equipment to China, though on 27 March 2024, Chinese president Xi Jinping told Rutte that "no force can stop the pace of China's scientific and technological progress".

Different stances on immigration policy within his four-party coalition had existed since the coalition government was formed. VVD and CDA supported restrictions on immigration, while D66 and CU opposed them. On 7 July 2023, the parties failed to reach an agreement and unanimously decided that they could not continue working together within the coalition. Following this, Rutte immediately offered the resignation of his government. The king asked that the prime minister and his government "continue to carry out the duties they consider necessary to the interests of the Kingdom in a caretaker capacity". Three days later, Rutte announced his departure both as political leader of the VVD and from national politics in general, after the installation of the next government.

While serving as outgoing prime minister, Rutte condemned the October 7 attacks in 2023 and expressed his support to Israel and its right to self-defense. Notably, he was the first foreign leader to speak with Israeli prime minister Benjamin Netanyahu on that day. Later that same month he visited Israel to express solidarity with the country, meeting with Netanyahu in Jerusalem. He rejected calls for a ceasefire in the Gaza war but supported "humanitarian pauses" to provide aid to civilians in the Gaza Strip. The Netherlands provided military aid to Israel. In February 2024, a court in the Netherlands ordered the Dutch government to stop exporting parts for F-35 fighter jets to Israel.

Due to the resignation of the cabinet general elections were held early, on 22 November 2023, with the VVD now under the leadership of Dilan Yeşilgöz.

In February 2024, Rutte visited Saudi Arabia and spoke with the Saudi crown prince Mohammed bin Salman about "broad cooperation". He would travel to Paris on 26 February, where Emmanuel Macron was hosting an emergency summit concerning the situation in Ukraine, which had suffered the loss of Avdiivka due to a lack of available ammunition. Czech PM Petr Fiala proposed to purchase 500,000 rounds of artillery ammunition for Ukrainian forces. This was the second time in one month the Czech government had aired the matter. The French had previously vetoed the idea to purchase the ammunition from foreign sources. On behalf of his government, Rutte announced that they would provide €100 million for this purpose. On 1 March Rutte increased the commitment to €250 million for Fiala's venture, as he went to Kharkiv to tour an underground metro station that had been repurposed into a primary school together with Zelenskyy. During this same tour, they signed the Netherlands-Ukraine bilateral security agreement.

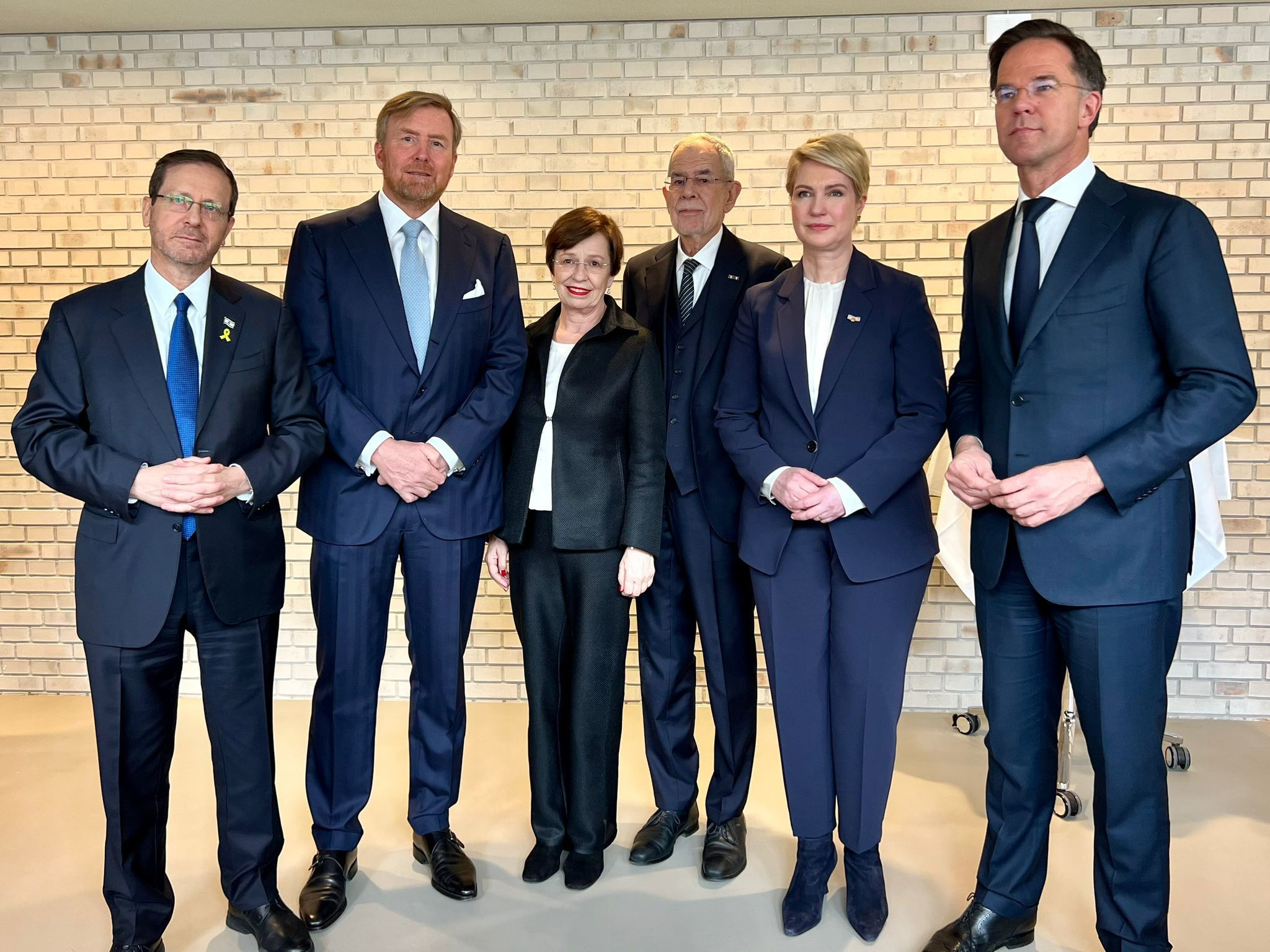
Rutte with Israeli president Isaac Herzog and King Willem-Alexander of the Netherlands on 10 March 2024

Later that month, Rutte threatened Israel with sanctions if the Israeli military launched a large-scale invasion of Rafah, saying the attack would be a "game changer" and have "political consequences". He also met with Chinese president Xi Jinping, where Rutte discussed the Russian invasion of Ukraine and tried to persuade China to exert its influence on Russia. Rutte said that "this is a direct security threat for us, because if Russia will be successful in Ukraine, it will be a threat to the whole of Europe. It will not end with Ukraine."

On 14 April 2024, Rutte condemned the Iranian strikes against Israel and reiterated the necessity for sanctions against Iran. Rutte stated that Iran's Islamic Revolutionary Guards Corps (IRGC) should be added to the EU's terrorism blacklist.

Rutte's government authorized Ukraine to use Dutch-supplied F-16 fighters to strike targets inside Russia in May. Rutte attended the June 2024 Ukraine peace summit, interpreting Putin's proposal for peace talks near the end of this summit as a sign of panic.

Rutte's fourth term as prime minister came to an end with the swearing in of the Schoof cabinet, which had been formed following the general election. This new cabinet is led by Dick Schoof, the former secretary-general of the Ministry of Justice and Security.

== Secretary General of NATO ==
=== 2024 ===
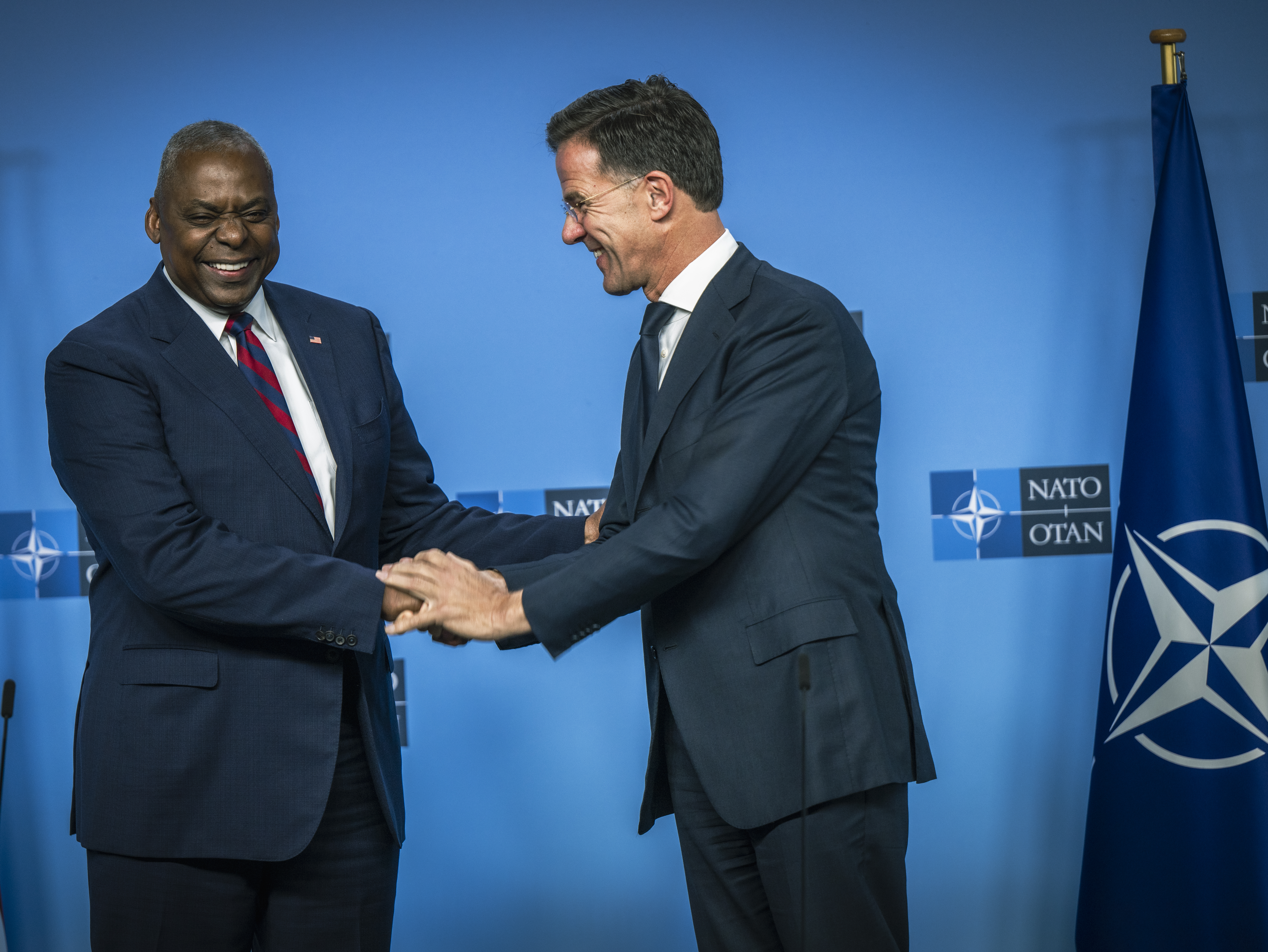
United States Secretary of Defense Lloyd Austin and Mark Rutte at NATO Headquarters in Brussels, Belgium on 17 October 2024

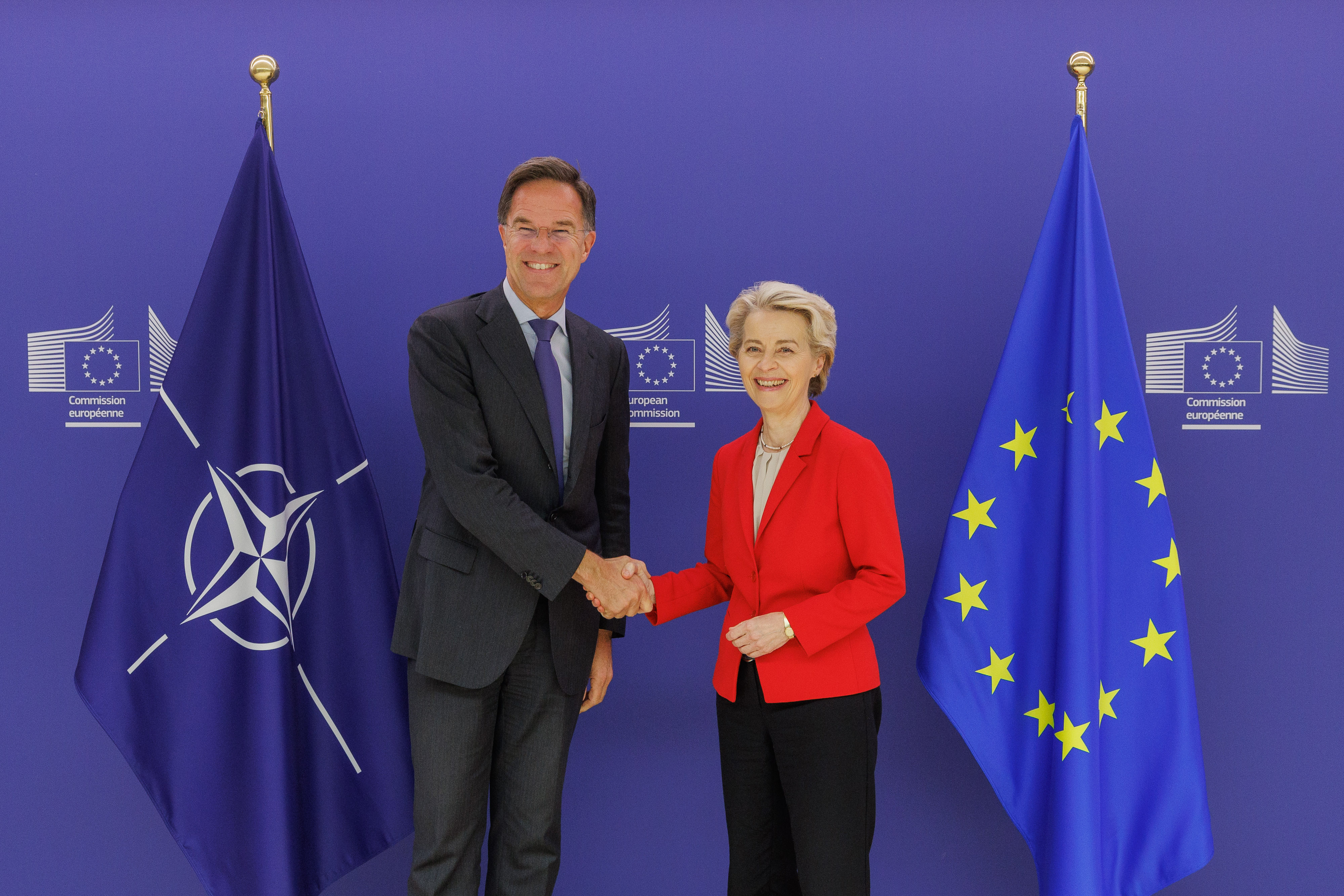
Rutte with European Commission President Ursula von der Leyen on 29 October 2024

Following his departure from national politics, Rutte succeeded Jens Stoltenberg as Secretary General of NATO on 1 October 2024 during a ceremonial handover at the NATO Headquarters in Brussels. Despite having previously stated that he wanted to focus on high school teaching after his prime ministership, he announced his candidacy for the position in October 2023. His bid received public support from the governments of the United States, the United Kingdom, Germany, and France in February 2024. Rutte managed to overcome opposition from the last holdouts of Turkey, Hungary, Slovakia, and Romania in the months thereafter, with his only opponent, Romanian president Klaus Iohannis, dropping out a week before his official appointment on 26 June 2024.

In October 2024, Rutte said that more than 600,000 Russian soldiers had been killed or wounded during the war against Ukraine.

As secretary general, Rutte called on member nations to increase their defence spending and production, stating that a wartime mentality was required. He said that the additional spending would be necessary to guarantee a collective defence and to avert a Russian attack following its invasion of Ukraine.

Rutte has repeatedly urged sending more weapons to Ukraine. He said that any future peace talks with Russia should be led by Ukraine from a position of strength.

Rutte criticized China's stance towards Taiwan, saying that "China is bullying Taiwan, and pursuing access to our critical infrastructure in ways that could cripple our societies." He added, "Russia, China, but also North Korea and Iran, are hard at work to try to weaken North America and Europe. To chip away at our freedom, they want to reshape the global order, not to create a fairer one, but to secure their own spheres of influence."

=== 2025 ===
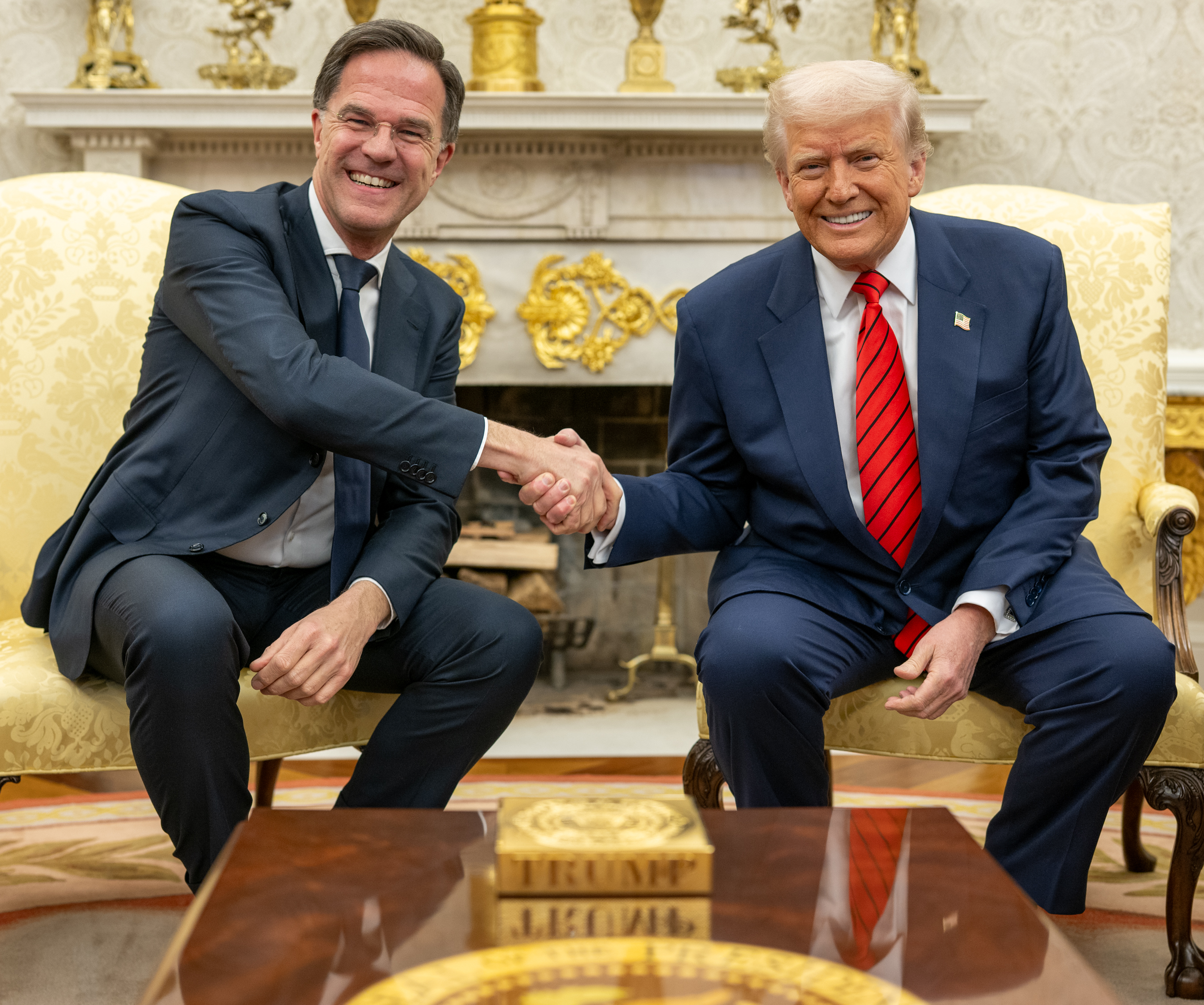
Rutte with U.S. President Donald Trump on 13 March 2025

In March 2025, following the new Trump administration's announcement that it does not support NATO membership for Ukraine, Rutte stated that Ukraine had never been promised NATO membership as part of a peace agreement. and that Europe and the US should eventually normalise relations with Russia after a peace agreement.

Rutte's first NATO summit as secretary general was the 2025 NATO summit, held in his hometown of The Hague. The summit concluded successfully and primarily addressed increasing NATO members' annual defense spending to a new 5% spending target. In his speech, Rutte urged the alliance to "shift to a wartime mindset and turbocharge our defense production and defense spending." The summit also confirmed continued support for Ukraine in its war against Russia. Rutte is often referred to as "Trump Whisperer" by publicly lauding Trump policies and Trump himself. During the summit, Rutte called Trump the "daddy" of NATO.

In June 2025, Rutte voiced support for US strikes on Iranian nuclear sites: in a private message published by Trump, Rutte praised and thanked the latter for his "decisive action" in Iran, calling it "truly extraordinary and something no one else dared to do."

In November 2025, Rutte met with Pakistani Foreign Minister Ishaq Dar in Brussels to discuss deeper cooperation on regional security, counterterrorism, and the strengthening of the Pakistan–NATO partnership.

In December 2025, during a NATO keynote speech, Rutte warned that Russia has returned large scale war to Europe and argued that NATO countries must urgently prepare their societies, economies and armed forces for a level of conflict comparable to that endured by their grandparents or great-grandparents, in order to deter war and prevent such devastation from becoming reality.

=== 2026 ===
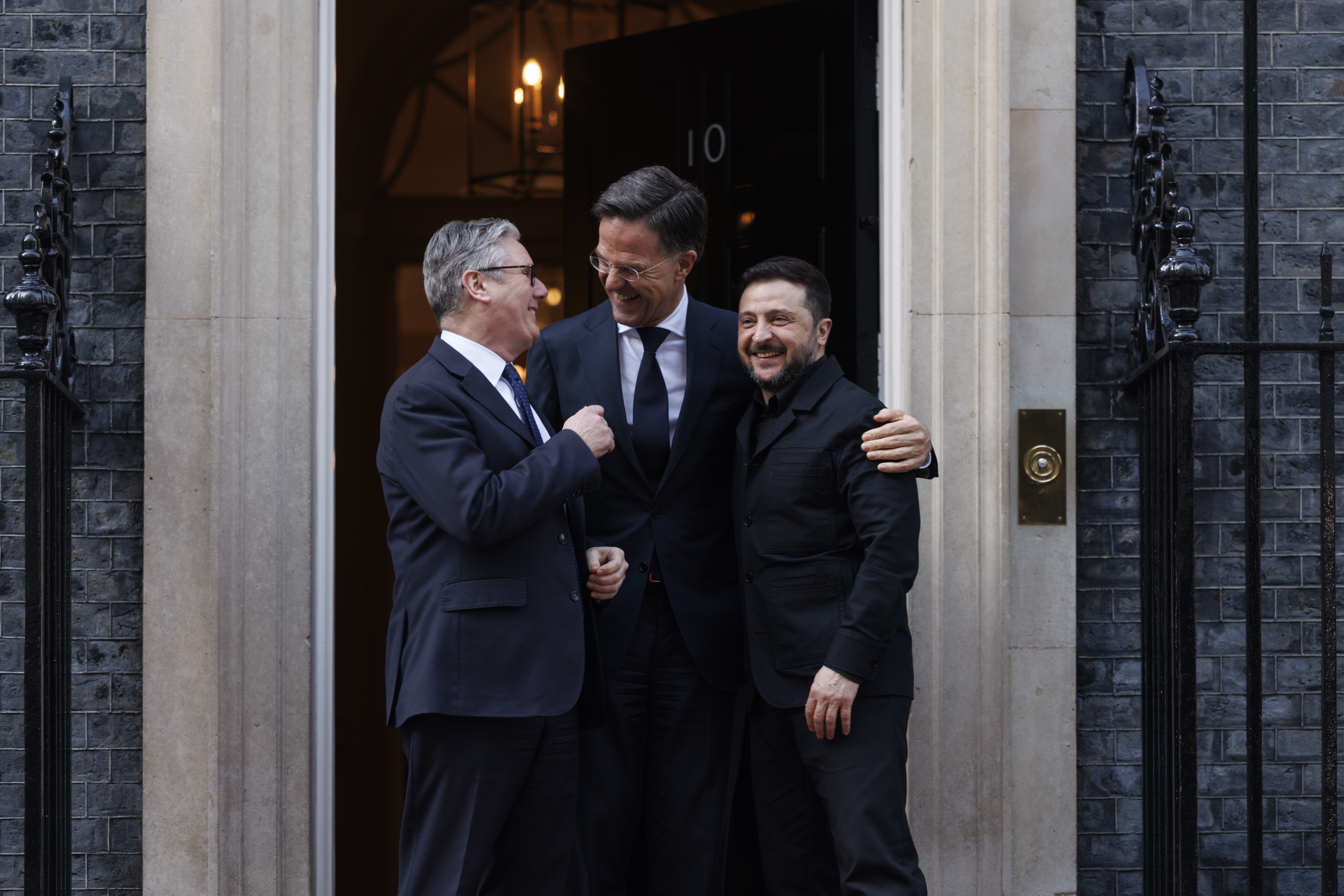
Prime Minister Keir Starmer, Mark Rutte, and President Volodymyr Zelenskyy at 10 Downing Street, London, during a trilateral meeting on 17 March 2026

On 21 January 2026, at the World Economic Forum, Trump and Rutte announced a "framework of a future deal" regarding Greenland and Arctic security. Following the meeting, Trump withdrew threats of punitive NATO tariffs previously linked to a potential sale of Greenland, citing addressed security concerns. While Trump described the understanding as a step toward a long-term agreement, Rutte said that discussions focused on Arctic security and that Greenlandic sovereignty was not on the table.

In a 2 March 2026 interview with BBC News, Rutte expressed strong support for the ongoing U.S. and Israeli military actions against Iran, characterizing the Iranian government as a "threat" to regional and European security. He praised U.S. and Israeli military strikes against Iran for degrading Tehran's nuclear and ballistic missile capabilities, calling the action "very important". Rutte stated that NATO as an alliance would not be involved in the conflict, and that any involvement is limited to individual member states. In March 2026, Rutte took a central role in coordinating the alliance's response to the closure of the Strait of Hormuz, which Iran blocked following major U.S. and Israeli airstrikes. Critics point out that Rutte has gone beyond his remit as Secretary General of NATO due to his support for the Iran war that does not involve NATO

In April 2026, amid threats of a U.S. withdrawal from NATO over the Iran war, Rutte met with Trump to emphasize allied contributions. During this period, he avoided public condemnation of the U.S. president's threats against Iranian civilian infrastructure and 'civilization,' instead applauding Trump's 'bold leadership and vision' in an effort to keep the administration committed to the alliance.

== Political style ==
Rutte has been described as hard-working, charming and pragmatic. He responds to messages from politicians within five minutes, and works "around the clock." Concerning ideology in politics, he has said "If you are looking for vision, you'd better visit an optician."

== Personal life ==
Rutte has never married and has no children.

He is a member of the Dutch Protestant Church. While he was prime minister, Rutte taught social studies on Thursday mornings at the Johan de Witt College, a secondary school in The Hague. Rutte is an admirer of American historian Robert Caro, especially his 1974 biography of Robert Moses, The Power Broker. He drives a Saab 9-3 estate. Before moving to Brussels in 2024 following his appointment as Secretary General of NATO, he lived in an apartment in Benoordenhout, a neighbourhood of The Hague, for several decades.

== National honours ==
- Australia: Honorary Companion of the Order of Australia (9 October 2019)
- France: Grand Officer of the Order of Legion of Honour (11 April 2023)
- Italy: Knight Grand Cross of the Order of Merit of the Italian Republic (20 December 2022)
- Luxembourg: Grand Cross of the Order of Merit of the Grand Duchy of Luxembourg (7 June 2024)
- Netherlands: Knight Grand Cross of the Order of the Netherlands Lion (2 July 2024)
- Ukraine: Knight of the Order of Prince Yaroslav the Wise, 1st degree (27 January 2023)

== Electoral history ==
Electoral history of Mark Rutte
Year	Body	Party	Pos.	Votes	Result		Ref.
Year	Body	Party	Pos.	Votes	Party seats	Individual	Ref.
2003	House of Representatives	People's Party for Freedom and Democracy	11	4,297	28	Won	
2006	House of Representatives	People's Party for Freedom and Democracy	1	553,200	22	Won	
2010	House of Representatives	People's Party for Freedom and Democracy	1	1,617,636	31	Won	
2012	House of Representatives	People's Party for Freedom and Democracy	1	2,129,000	41	Won	
2017	House of Representatives	People's Party for Freedom and Democracy	1	1,760,117	33	Won	
2021	House of Representatives	People's Party for Freedom and Democracy	1	1,977,651	34	Won	

== See also ==
- List of international prime ministerial trips made by Mark Rutte

Diplomatic posts
Preceded by Jens Stoltenberg	Secretary General of NATO; 2024–present	Incumbent
Political offices
Preceded by Hans Hoogervorst	State Secretary for Social Affairs and Employment; 2002–2004	Succeeded by Henk van Hoof
Preceded by Annette Nijs	State Secretary for Education, Culture and Science; 2004–2006	Succeeded by Bruno Bruins
Preceded by Jan Peter Balkenende	Prime Minister of the Netherlands; 2010–2024	Succeeded by Dick Schoof
Party political offices
Preceded by Jozias van Aartsen	Leader of the People's Party for Freedom and Democracy; 2006–2023	Succeeded by Dilan Yeşilgöz
