= 2026 in the Caribbean =

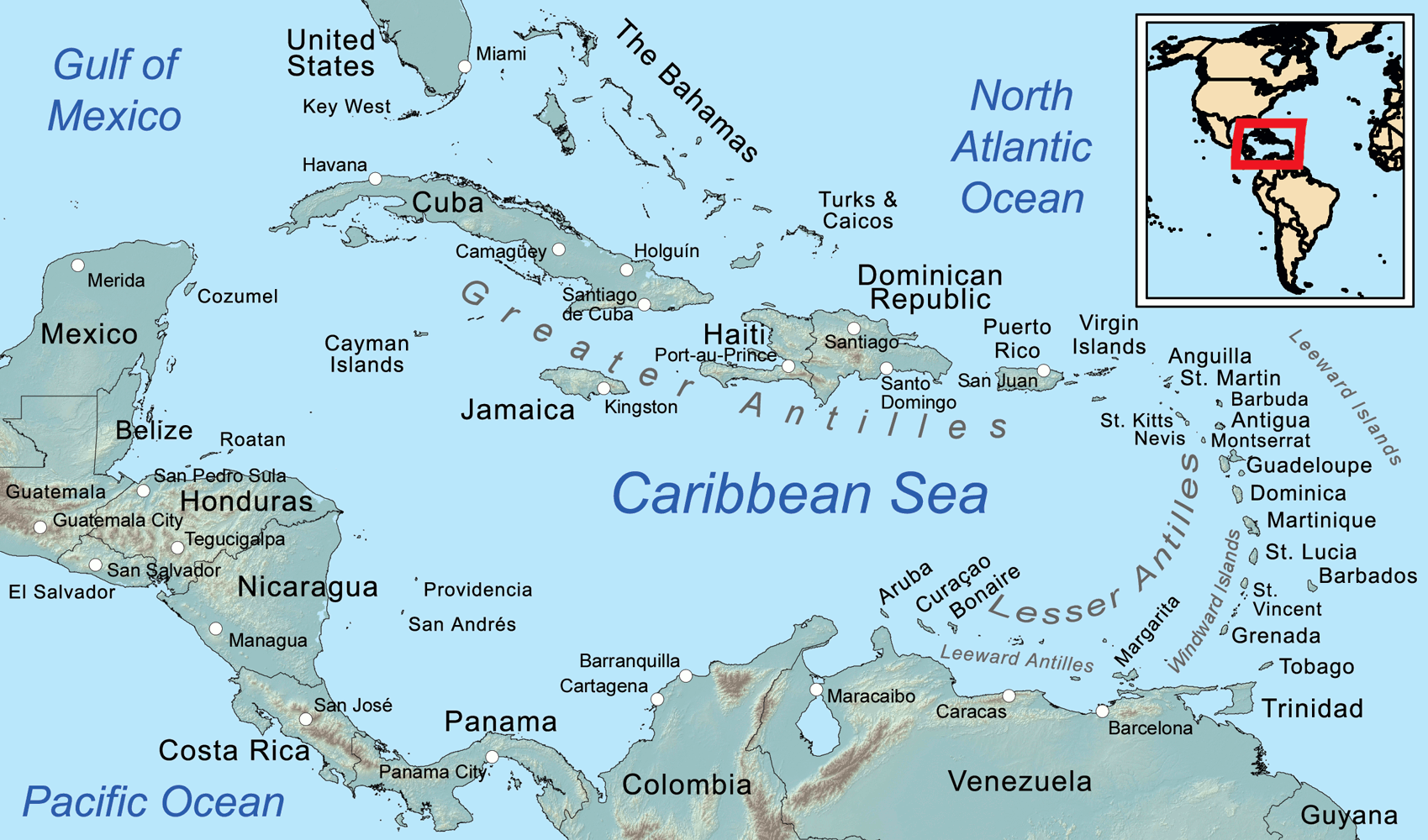
the Caribbean, a subregion of the Americas that includes the Caribbean Sea and its islands

The following lists events that happened during 2026 in the Caribbean.

== Elections ==
- 30 April – 2026 Antiguan general election
- 12 May – 2026 Bahamian general election
- 5 November – 2026 Grenadian general election

== Sovereign states ==
=== Cuba ===
(Cuba)

=== Dominica ===
(Dominica)

=== Dominican Republic ===
(Dominican Republic)

=== Haiti ===
(Haiti)

=== Trinidad and Tobago ===
(Trinidad and Tobago)

== Commonwealth Realms ==
(United Kingdom)

=== Antigua and Barbuda ===
(Antigua and Barbuda)

=== The Bahamas ===
(The Bahamas)

=== Barbados ===
(Barbados)

=== Grenada ===
(Grenada)

=== Jamaica ===
(Jamaica)

=== Saint Kitts and Nevis ===
(Saint Kitts and Nevis)

=== Saint Lucia ===
(Saint Lucia)

=== Saint Vincent and the Grenadines ===
(Saint Vincent and the Grenadines)

== Dependencies ==
=== British overseas territories ===
(United Kingdom)

==== Anguilla ====
(Anguilla)

==== Bermuda ====
(Bermuda)

==== British Virgin Islands ====
(British Virgin Islands)

==== Cayman Islands ====
(Cayman Islands)

==== Montserrat ====
(Montserrat)

==== Turks and Caicos Islands ====
(Turks and Caicos Islands)

=== France ===
(France)

=== Kingdom of the Netherlands ===
(Netherlands)

==== Aruba ====
(Aruba)

==== Curaçao ====
(Curaçao)

==== Sint Maarten ====
(Sint Maarten)

==== Caribbean Netherlands ====
Bonaire, Sint Eustatius, and (Saba (island)) Saba

=== United States ===
The (United States)

==== Puerto Rico ====
(Puerto Rico)

==== United States Virgin Islands ====
(United States Virgin Islands)

== Holidays ==
- Public holidays in Antigua and Barbuda
- Public holidays in Bermuda
- Public holidays in Cuba
- Public holidays in Haiti
- Public holidays in Saint Kitts and Nevis
- Public holidays in Curaçao

== See also ==
- 2026 in politics and government
- 2020s in political history
- 2026 Atlantic hurricane season
- List of state leaders in the Caribbean in 2026
- Caribbean Community
- Organization of American States
