= Jelleke Veenendaal =

Dutch politician

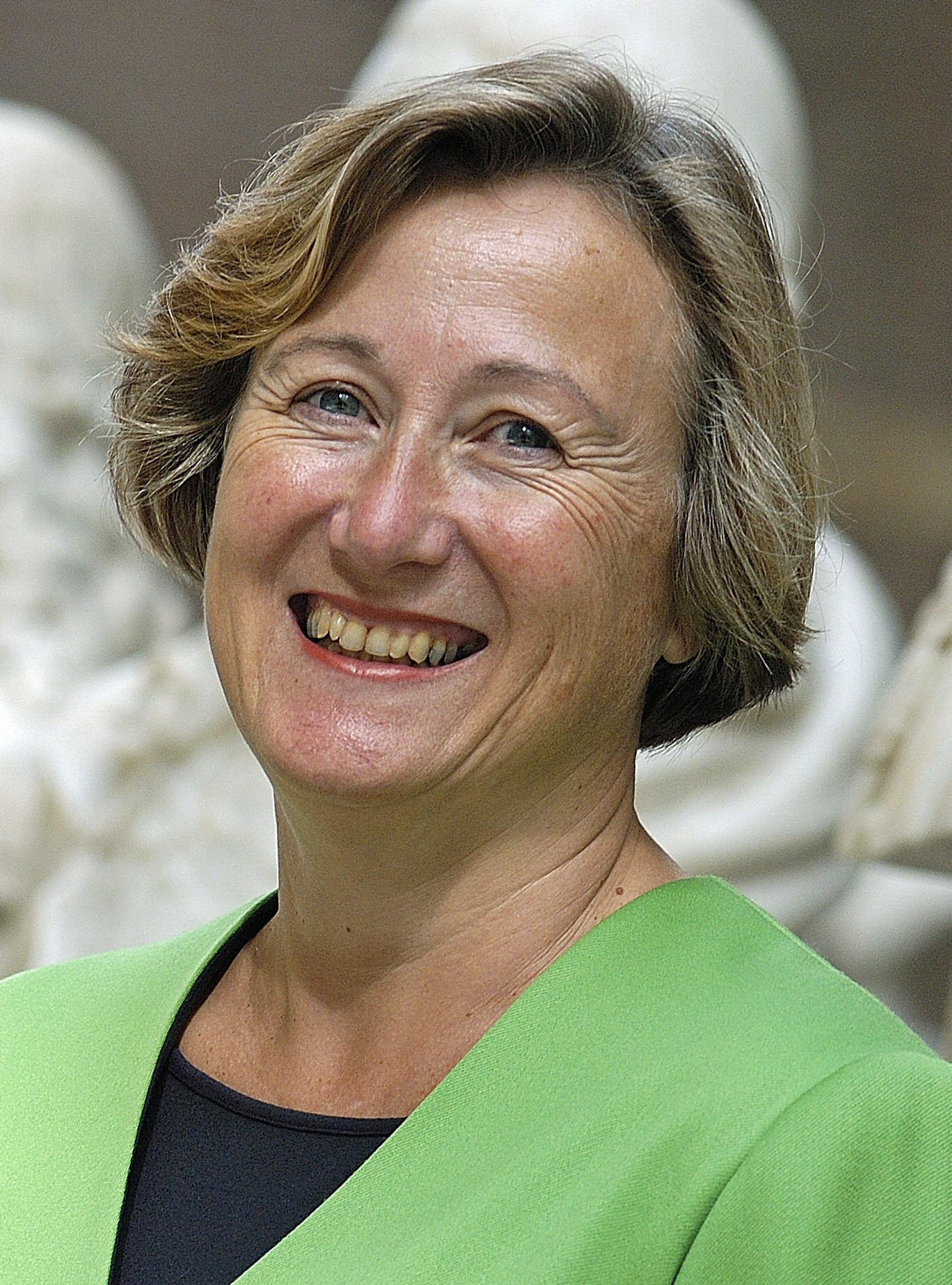
Veenendaal in 2006

Jelleke Veenendaal (born 15 December 1953) is a Dutch politician who served as a member of the House of Representatives for the People's Party for Freedom and Democracy (VVD) from 2003 to 2006. She was one of the three candidates in the 2006 VVD leadership election, in which she placed last, with 803 votes (3%). Veenendaal is a native of Alkmaar.

== Life ==
=== Life before politics ===
After attending a public elementary school in Utrecht, Veenendaal attended MULO. She graduated in 1971 specializing in the sciences. She worked for a development cooperation NGO in Frankfurt between 1971 and 1974. She continued to study for medical analyst at MBO-level, graduating in 1976. She took several jobs as a medical analyst in 1978-1979. She then endeavoured in travel, and had management functions with several foreign travel organisations, in the period 1979-1983. In 1984 she returned to the Netherlands, working as a medical analyst in Amsterdam. In 1989 she became a manager for the HEMS, which coordinates the restaurants and bistros at Schiphol Airport. She took an evening course in business administration, resulting in a completed HEAO-study in 1990. After her studies she took a job at the Chamber of Commerce of Alkmaar, as head of public relations. In 1993 she became a professional advisor for small businesses in Zaandam. In 1997 she temporarily quit working because of an illness. In 2001 she became commercial director of Reek Weegtechniek in Purmerend. A job she gave up in 2003, to enter parliament.

In this period she had already become active within the VVD, as secretary of the Purmerend branch, and as member of the board of the party's women organisation. She also took courses in liberalism and liberal politics, and in political communication from the Haya van Someren Foundation, which trains the VVD members on request. She also was member of the board of the NVVH, the Dutch Association of Home Makers.

=== Political life ===
In 2003 she entered the House of Representatives. She was not on an eligible position, but after the formation, many VVD MPs had become minister, leaving their parliamentary seats. In parliament she was member of the backbench, and spokesperson for housing policy. In 2005 she proposed a plan together with social-democratic MP, Staf Depla. She also pleaded for a more lenient policy towards permanent housing in vacation houses.

Quite unexpectedly Veenendaal announced her ambition to become leader of the VVD, and would run in the 2006 VVD leadership election as -then only- candidate against Mark Rutte. She claimed that without another candidate the election would be a sham and that it was important that a woman ran. She did not discuss her ambition with the party board, but did consult her political friends. She was generally seen as a very unlikely candidate against the popular Rutte, who is backed by the party's board, and after Rita Verdonk entered the game, her chances have vanished entirely. In the debates set up around the election, Veenendaal shows herself more left and progressive than Verdonk and Rutte. She lost the elections to Rutte obtaining only 803 votes, 3% of the total. The same year she left politics.
