= 2026 in politics =

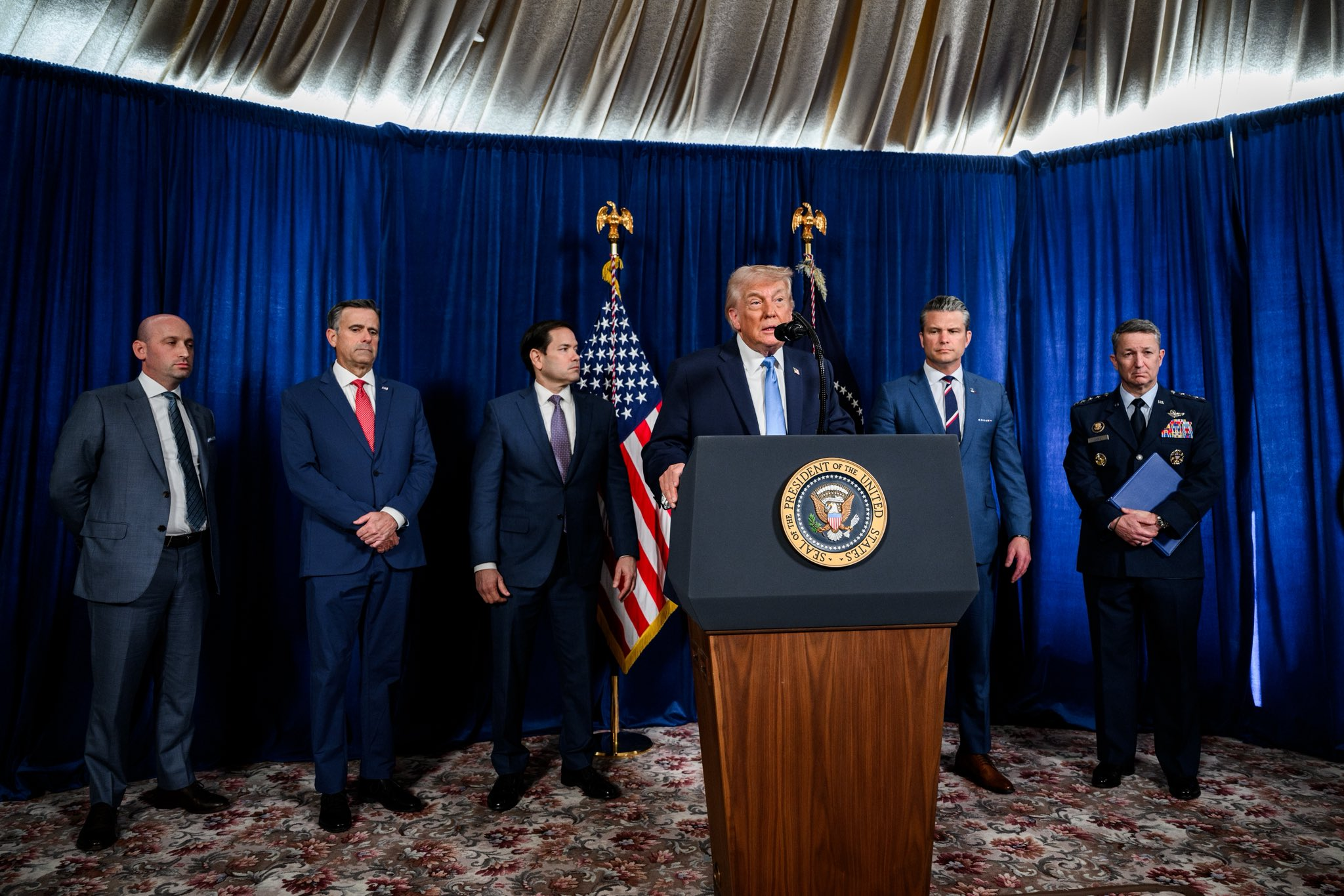

The following political events have occurred or are scheduled to occur in 2026.

== Events ==
=== January ===
- January 1
  - Bulgaria adopted the Euro, becoming the 21st member of the Eurozone.
  - Zohran Mamdani was sworn in as mayor of New York City, becoming the first Muslim and first Asian American to hold the office.
- January 3 – US forces arrested president of Venezuela Nicolás Maduro and his wife Cilia Flores following American airstrikes on military sites in northern Venezuela.
- January 7 – Protests spread across the United States following the killing of Renée Good by an Immigration and Customs Enforcement officer.
- January 8 – Thongloun Sisoulith was re-elected as General Secretary of the Lao People's Revolutionary Party, the most powerful position in the one-party state.
- January 9 – A majority of EU member states voted in favour of a free trade agreement with Mercosur.
- January 14 - The governing MPs in the Parliament of Singapore unanimously passed a motion to deem Workers' Party MP Pritam Singh being unsuitable for the position of the de jure Leader of the Opposition, following a perjury conviction relating to the resignation of former MP Raeesah Khan in 2021. Prime Minister Lawrence Wong removed Singh from the position the following day.
- January 15 – The 2026 Ugandan general election was held, with incumbent Yoweri Museveni winning a seventh consecutive term and deadly protests breaking out over the result.
- January 17 – Protests occur throughout Greenland and Denmark over US president Donald Trump's threats to annex the territory.
- January 18 – The first round of the 2026 Portuguese presidential election was held.
- January 22 – The United States formally withdrew from the World Health Organization.
- January 23
  - Tô Lâm was re-elected as General Secretary of the Communist Party of Vietnam, the most powerful position in the one-party state.
  - Iliana Iotova was sworn is as president of Bulgaria following the resignation of Rumen Radev, becoming the first woman to hold the post.
- January 24 – The killing of Alex Pretti in Minneapolis fuels further protests across the United States.
- January 27 - The India–European Union Free Trade Agreement (simply called the India–EU FTA) is a comprehensive free trade agreement concluded between the Republic of India and the European Union (EU) on 27 January 2026, following negotiations that spanned nearly two decades.
- January 29 – The European Union designated the Islamic Revolutionary Guard Corps as a terrorist organisation.

=== February ===
- February 1
  - Former British Ambassador to the United States and cabinet member Peter Mandelson resigned from the Labour Party over links to Jeffrey Epstein. Mandelson was later reported to the Metropolitan Police and resigned from the House of Lords over accusations he forwarded internal government emails to Epstein.
  - Laura Fernández Delgado was elected president in the first round of the 2026 Costa Rican general election.
- February 5 – The New START Treaty between the United States and Russia expired.
- February 8
  - The Liberal Democratic Party won a supermajority in the 2026 Japanese general election.
  - A general election and a constitutional referendum were held in Thailand, with conservative populist party Bhumjaithai winning the largest number of seats and the adoption of a new constitution being approved.
  - The second round of the 2026 Portuguese presidential election was held, resulting in a victory for António José Seguro.
- February 9 - Israeli president Isaac Herzog began an official visit to Australia.
- February 11 – The Barbados Labour Party won every seat in the 2026 Barbadian general election.
- February 12 – The 2026 Bangladeshi general election was held, with the Bangladesh National Party winning a landslide victory.
- February 13 – Sussan Ley, the first female leader of the Liberal Party of Australia, was ousted by Angus Taylor.
- February 17 – Peruvian president José Jerí was censured by Congress and replaced by José María Balcázar.
- February 19 – Former President of South Korea Yoon Suk Yeol was sentenced to life imprisonment for his conviction of insurrection over the martial law crisis in December 2024 following eight months of court trials and ten months since his impeachment.
- February 22
  - Kim Jong Un was re-elected as General Secretary of the Workers' Party of Korea, the most powerful position in the one-party state.
  - The 2026 Laotian parliamentary election was held.
- February 23 – Rob Jetten was sworn in as prime minister of the Netherlands, becoming both the youngest and first openly gay prime minister in Dutch history.
- February 26
  - Jersey approved the legalisation of assisted dying in a landslide vote.
  - The 2026 Gorton and Denton by-election was held, resulting in a victory for Green Party candidate Hannah Spencer.
- 28 February – The 2026 Iran war broke out following co-ordinated airstrikes by the United States and Israel, and the assassination of Ali Khamenei.

=== March ===
- March 5 – The 2026 Nepalese general election was held, with the centrist Rastriya Swatantra Party winning the most seats.
- March 8
  - The 2026 Colombian parliamentary election was held.
  - Mojtaba Khamenei was announced as Supreme Leader of Iran following his father's assassination.
- March 13 – First Secretary of the Communist Party of Cuba Miguel Díaz-Canel entered negotiations with the Trump administration in an effort to end the United States embargo against Cuba.
- March 15
  - The first round of the 2026 French municipal elections was held, with right-wing and centrist parties making notable gains.
  - The 2026 Kazakh constitutional referendum was held, with nearly 90% of voters in favour.
  - The 2026 North Korean parliamentary election was held.
  - The 2026 Republic of the Congo presidential election was held, with incumbent president Denis Sassou Nguesso winning a fifth consecutive term.
  - The 2026 Vietnamese legislative election was held.
- March 22 – The 2026 Slovenian parliamentary election was held, resulting in the ruling Freedom Movement losing their majority.
- March 24
  - The 2026 Danish general election was held, with neither political bloc winning a majority.
  - The EU and Australia concluded negotiations on a comprehensive Free Trade Agreement (FTA), aimed at removing over 99% of tariffs on EU exports and 98% of Australian goods exports to the EU.

=== April ===
- April 10 – The 2026 Djiboutian presidential election was held.
- April 12
  - The 2026 Beninese presidential election was held, with independent candidate Romuald Wadagni winning with over 94% of the vote.
  - The 2026 Hungarian parliamentary election was held, with the opposition Tisza Party winning a supermajority, ending 16 years of government previously led by Viktor Orbán.
- April 12–13 – The first round of the 2026 Peruvian general election was held, alongside voting for both lower and upper houses in Peru. This is the first senate election since April 1990 following the of the restoration of their senate after its initial abolishment in 1993.
- April 19 – The 2026 Bulgarian parliamentary election was held, with former president Rumen Radev's Progressive Bulgaria party winning a landslide majority.
- April 30 – The 2026 Antiguan general election was held.

=== May ===
- May 7
  - The 2026 United Kingdom local elections were held.
  - The 2026 Scottish Parliament election was held, with the Scottish National Party winning the most seats for a fifth successive election.
  - The 2026 Senedd election was held, with Plaid Cymru winning the most seats and ending the Labour Party's century-long dominance of Welsh politics.
- May 11 – The Filipino Vice President Sara Duterte faces her impeachment for the second time with the trials commencing on July 6; this was the second such impeachment after the first unsuccessful impeachment attempt last year.
- May 12 – The 2026 Bahamian general election was held.
- May 14 – Evika Siliņa resigned as prime minister of Latvia following a political crisis after Ukrainian drones crashed in Latvia.
- May 17 – The 2026 Cape Verdean parliamentary election was held.
- May 24 – The 2026 Cypriot legislative election was held.
- May 30 – The 2026 Maltese general election was held
- May 31 – The first round of the 2026 Colombian presidential election was held.

=== June ===
- June 1 – The 2026 Ethiopian general election was held
- June 3 – The 2026 South Korean local elections was held.
- June 6 – A group of young Indian students and leftists formed an unofficial Cockroach Janta Party, precipitating a series of nationwide protests in Jantar Mantar, New Delhi over a leak of NEET exam previously occurred one month earlier on May 3.
- June 7
  - The 2026 Armenian parliamentary election was held.
  - The second round of the 2026 Peruvian general election was held.
  - The 2026 Kosovan parliamentary election was held.
- June 22 – Following months of criticism and pressure, Keir Starmer resigned as prime minister of the United Kingdom. Starmer later resigned his membership as Member of Parliament to assume his role as member of the Chiltern Hundreds on September 1.
- June 28 – The 2026 New Caledonian legislative election was held.
- June 29 – Following recounts and scrutiny in the second round of the 2026 Peruvian general election, four-time presidential candidate Keiko Fujimori, daughter of the late-Peruvian President Alberto Fujimori, was declared as the country's second female President-elect, after Dina Boluarte. She later took office on 28 July 2026.

=== July ===
- July 2 – The 2026 Algerian parliamentary election was held.
- July 4 – The United States celebrates its semiquincentennial anniversary of its indepencence.
- July 7 – Two explosive devices near the Four Seasons Hotel Damascus explode, wounding at least 18 people. It is alleged to be an attempted assassination of Emmanuel Macron.
- July 17 – Andy Burnham was elected unopposed in the Labour Party's leadership election, making him the party's newest leader and Prime Minister-designate. Burnham took office three days later.
- July 19 – The 2026 São Toméan presidential election was held, with incumbent nonpartisan President Carlos Vila Nova re-elected for a second five-year term.
- July 20 – Nicaraguan Co-President Daniel Ortega ceases their country's electoral system, thereby suspending the next general election indefinitely as the country's elections were now declared obsolete.
- July 25 – Indian Education Minister Dharmendra Pradhan resigns from the position in light of the protests over a NEET exam leak. Most of the protests ceased following his resignation.
- July 30 – A crisis broke out on the Morocco–Spain border when over 80,000 people attempted to illegally gain entry into Ceuta and Melilla. This was the third similar incident within five years, after 2021 and 2022.

=== August ===
- August 7 – Amidst the backdrop on the ongoing Iran war, the Mecca Defence Alliance, a trilateral mutual defence pact between the three countries of Saudi Arabia, Pakistan, and Turkey, were signed by its respective representatives: Saudi Crown Prince Mohammed bin Salman, Pakistani Prime Minister Shehbaz Sharif, and Turkish President Recep Tayyip Erdoğan.
- August 13 – The 2026 Zambian general election was held, with Hakainde Hichilema and his running mate Mutale Nalumango re-elected for a second five-year term.
- August 20 – The Democratic Autonomous Administration of North and East Syria was dissolved, ending a 12-year de facto autonomy with Syria as a result of the ongoing northeastern offensive that started this year.
- August 23 – The 2026 Kazakh legislative election was held, with Aibek Dädebai of the newly-formed Ädilet forming the new government of Kazakhstan.
- August 29 – The 2026 Icelandic European Union membership negotiations referendum was held. A majority of voters rejected the government's proposal of resuming their European Union accession negotiations.

=== September ===
- September 2 – The 2026 Estonian presidential election was held, with the Riigikogu voting to elect Chancellor of Justice Ülle Madise as the next president.
- September 13 – The 2026 Swedish general election was held, with the opposition left-wing bloc winning a majority with a combined 176 seats.
- September 16 – Former President of Kosovo Hashim Thaçi was sentenced to a 25-year imprisonment for his conviction relating to the war crimes in the Kosovo War.
- September 18 – A series of mass protests were launched by several French high-school students and other student unions, which led by Ryad Rani, president of the secondary-students' union Union Syndicale Lycéenne (USL), across France and other European countries.
- September 20 – The 2026 Russian legislative election was held, with United Russia winning a supermajority of seats.
- September 23
  - The 2026 Moroccan general election was held, with the Authenticity and Modernity Party winning the most seats and Fatima Ezzahra El Mansouri being appointed as the first female prime minister of Morocco.
  - A series of protests in Spain broke over the government's management of the affordable housing crisis following a controversial eviction of a resident, María del Carmen "Maricarmen" Abascal, before dying two weeks later, further escalating the protests. These protests and the government's crisis both precipitate a call for a snap election, due to be held two months later.
- September 27
  - The 2026 São Toméan parliamentary election was held, with the Movement for the Liberation of São Tomé and Príncipe – Social Democratic Party winning the most seats.
  - Serbian president Aleksandar Vučić resigned ahead of parliamentary elections following 18 months of student-led protests.

=== October ===
- October 3 – The 2026 Latvian parliamentary election was held, with the United List winning the most seats in the election.
- October 4
  - The first presidential round of the 2026 Brazilian general election was held, with Liberal Party of Brazil winning the most seats in the Chamber of Deputies.
  - The 2026 Bosnian general election was held, with incumbent presidents Denis Bećirović and Željka Cvijanović re-elected for their second term, and Darijana Filipović becoming the new Croat member due to incumbent Željko Komšić's ineligibility due to term limits.
- October 5 – The 2026 Quebec general election was held, with the Parti Québécois defeating the incumbent Coalition Avenir Québec to form the next National Assembly of Quebec.
- October 19 – The 2026 Alberta independence referendum was held, with almost 75% of voters rejecting independence.
- October 25
  - The first round of the 2026 Bulgarian presidential election was held.
  - The 2026 Serbian parliamentary election was held, with former president Aleksandar Vučić's United Serbia coalition losing to the grassroots opposition Student List.
  - The second presidential round of the 2026 Brazilian general election was held, with incumbent president Luiz Inácio Lula da Silva winning a fourth term in an upset victory.
- October 27
  - The 2026 Israeli legislative election was held, with results confirmed on November 4 where the ruling party Likud won the most seats for Knesset.
  - Khaleel Kothdiwala was sworn in as a member of the Senate of Barbados by President of Barbados Jeffrey Bostic. Kothdiwala was appointed as a Government Senator on the advice of Prime Minister of Barbados Mia Mottley. At 23 years old, he is the youngest Senator in the history of Barbados, as well as the first Muslim.
- October 30 – Poland's Constitutional Tribunal crisis deepened following the suspensions of the president of the tribunal, Bogdan Święczkowski and vice-president Bartłomiej Sochański by judge Anna Korwin-Piotrowska.

=== November ===
- November 3 – The 2026 United States midterm elections were held, with the Democratic Party making historic gains and taking control of both the House of Representatives and the Senate.
- November 4 – The 2026 South African municipal elections was held.
- November 5 – President of Paraguay Santiago Peña resigned following the collapse of Ueno Bank, which contributed to his eventual arrest. Vice President of Paraguay Pedro Alliana assumed presidency afterwards.
- November 7 – The 2026 New Zealand general election was held, with National Party projected to win its most seats to form the government; the remainder of the results of overhang seats are to be declared by November 27.
- November 12 – Vice President of Indonesia Gibran Rakabuming Raka resigned of his own volition for the sake of the nation and the state, as well as to ensure the smooth operation of the government.
- November 19
  - A Coalition of the Willing was formed through the meeting of 42 governments in Berlin in hopes to end the ongoing Russo-Ukrainian war.
  - The International Court of Justice, the principal judicial organ of the United Nations, made a ruling about Myanmar committing a genocide against Rohingya people of Muslim minority during military operations in the Rakhine State which started started in 2016. This ruling is the first such case is history where an international court found rulings for the one country to commit a genocide against a state.

== Predicted and scheduled events ==
- November 28 – The 2026 Palestinian legislative election is scheduled to be held.
- November 29 – The 2026 Spanish general election is scheduled to be held.
- December 5 – The 2026 Gambian presidential election is scheduled to be held.
- December 6 - The 2026 Dominican general election is scheduled to be held.
- December 22 – The 2026 South Sudanese general election is scheduled to be held, the first since the country's independence in 2011.
- December 27 – The 2026 Serbian presidential election must be held no later than this date.
