= Rita Verdonk =

Dutch politician (born 1965)

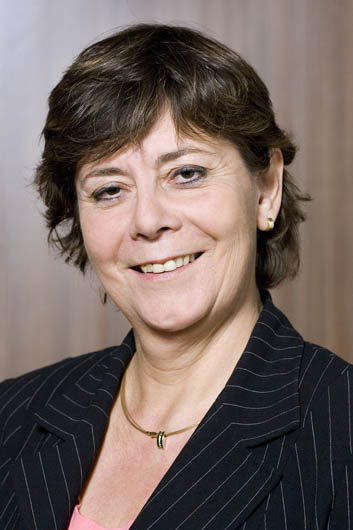
- Verdonk in 2006

Leader of Trots op Nederland
- In office 17 October 2007 – 19 November 2011
- Preceded by: Office established
- Succeeded by: Hero Brinkman

Chair of Trots op Nederland
- In office 17 October 2007 – 19 November 2011
- Preceded by: Office established
- Succeeded by: Theo Reijnen

Member of the House of Representatives
- In office 30 November 2006 – 17 June 2010

Minister of Justice
- In office 21 September 2006 – 22 September 2006; Ad interim
- Prime Minister: Jan Peter Balkenende
- Preceded by: Piet Hein Donner
- Succeeded by: Ernst Hirsch Ballin

Minister for Integration, Rehabilitation, Prevention, Youth Justice
- In office 14 December 2006 – 22 February 2007
- Prime Minister: Jan Peter Balkenende
- Preceded by: Herself (as Minister for Integration and Asylum Affairs)
- Succeeded by: Office discontinued

Minister for Integration and Asylum Affairs
- In office 27 May 2003 – 14 December 2006
- Prime Minister: Jan Peter Balkenende
- Preceded by: Hilbrand Nawijn
- Succeeded by: Herself (as Minister for Integration, Rehabilitation, Prevention, Youth Justice)

Personal details
- Born: Maria Cornelia Frederika Verdonk; 18 October 1955 (age 71) Utrecht, Netherlands
- Party: HvDH (since 2022); DNA (since 2026)
- Other political affiliations: PPR (1976–1978); PSP (1978–1980); VVD (2002–2007); TON (2007–2011); Independent (1980–2002; 2007; 2011–2022)
- Spouse: Peter Willems (m. 1980)
- Children: 2
- Education: Radboud University Nijmegen (Bachelor of Social Science, Master of Criminal Justice)
- Occupation: Politician; Civil servant; Businesswoman; Nonprofit director; Political consultant; Management consultant; Columnist

Maria Cornelia Frederika "Rita" Verdonk (born 18 October 1955) is a Dutch politician and businesswoman formerly affiliated with the People's Party for Freedom and Democracy (VVD) and later Proud of the Netherlands (TON), which she founded in 2007. Since 2022, she has been a municipal councillor of The Hague, elected on the list led by Richard de Mos.

Verdonk attended a Gymnasium in Utrecht from June 1968 until June 1974 and applied at the Radboud University Nijmegen in June 1974 majoring in Law before switching to Criminology and obtaining a Bachelor of Criminal Justice degree in July 1979 before graduating with a Master of Criminal Justice degree in July 1983. Verdonk worked as a civil servant for the Ministry of Justice from September 1983 until October 1996 and as director of the department of State Security of the Domestic Security Service (BVD) from October 1996 until November 1999. Verdonk worked as a management consultant for KPMG and Atos from November 1999 until May 2003.

After the election of 2003 Verdonk was appointed as Minister for Integration and Asylum Affairs in the Cabinet Balkenende II, taking office on 27 May 2003. After the Leader of the People's Party for Freedom and Democracy and Parliamentary leader of the People's Party for Freedom and Democracy in the House of Representatives Jozias van Aartsen announced that he was stepping down as Leader and Parliamentary leader in the House of Representatives following the defeat in the municipal elections of 2006, Verdonk announced her candidacy to succeed him. Verdonk lost the leadership election to incumbent State Secretary for Education, Culture and Science Mark Rutte on 31 May 2006. The Cabinet Balkenende II fell on 30 June 2006 as a result of the Verdonk-Ayaan Hirsi Ali controversy. Verdonk continued to serve in a demissionary capacity until the cabinet was replaced by the caretaker Cabinet Balkenende III with Verdonk continuing as Minister for Integration and Asylum Affairs, taking office on 7 July 2006. Verdonk served as acting Minister of Justice from 21 September 2006 until 22 September 2006 following the resignation of Piet Hein Donner.

Verdonk was elected as a Member of the House of Representatives after the election of 2006, taking office on 30 November 2006. The Cabinet Balkenende III was replaced by the Cabinet Balkenende IV following the cabinet formation of 2007 on 22 February 2007. On 14 September 2007 Verdonk was expelled from the People's Party for Freedom and Democracy parliamentary group in the House of Representatives following months of tensions with Leader and Parliamentary leader Mark Rutte and continued to serve in the House of Representatives as an independent. On 17 October 2007 she announced the founding of her own political party Proud of the Netherlands (Dutch: Trots op Nederland) (Trots). For the Dutch general election of 2010 Verdonk served as lead candidate but Proud of the Netherlands did not win any seats in the House of Representatives and she continued to serve until the end of the parliamentary term on 17 June 2010.

Verdonk retired from active politics and became active in the private sector and public sector and occupied numerous seats as a corporate director and nonprofit director on several boards of directors and supervisory boards and worked as a political consultant and management consultant.

== Early life ==
Maria Cornelia Frederika Verdonk was born on 18 October 1955 in Utrecht. She attended High School at Utrecht's Niels Stensen College at the atheneum level. She went on to study sociology at the Radboud University in Nijmegen, which at the time was considered left-wing, and specialized in the sociology of organisations and criminology. Verdonk was member of a sub-faculty board of the university and a member of the activist group Bond voor Wetsovertreders (BWO; English: Union for Lawbreakers) which had close ties with the far-left Pacifist Socialist Party. Its 1977 manifesto included as the organisation's aims: "to curb and/or prevent material damage and immaterial damage inflicted to individuals or groups in our society by the Dutch legal system". The BWO campaigned for reforms such as detainee minimum wages, the abolition of censorship of letters for detainees, and the right to unsupervised visits. The group visited inmates at a local prison and undertook legal interventions on their behalf.

Verdonk participated in a non-violent human blockade during the Pierson riots of 1981, when plans for housing demolition to make room for a parking lot triggered violent civil unrest. Because of her activism during this period, she earned the nickname "Red Rita."

After graduating in 1983, Verdonk became a trainee at the Department of Correction at the Ministry of Justice. In 1984, she was promoted to Assistant-Director at the Scheveningen Detention Centre. In 1988, she became a member of the board of the Prison 'De Schie' in Rotterdam. In 1992, she switched to the Ministry of Justice's department of Youth and Hospital Orders Institutions, where she reached the position of vice-director. In 1996, she was appointed as Director of the Department of State Security of the Ministry of Interior Affairs.

Between 1999 and 2003 she was Senior Manager / Director of the consulting firm KPMG (as of 2002, Atos KPMG Consulting). In 2002 she became a member of the People's Party for Freedom and Democracy (VVD) to become more active in politics. In a 2006 article, some of Verdonk's friends and colleagues from her Nijmegen days expressed surprise at Verdonk's radical switch in political orientation after graduating in 1983. Some observed that Verdonk had never held outspoken left-wing ideals and criticized communist regimes; others hypothesized that it was part of a growing-up phase; a former treasurer of the BWO suspected that Verdonk had been a police informer all those years.

== Minister for Integration ==
In 2003, Verdonk was appointed Minister for Integration and Immigration. She soon developed a reputation for toughness and outspokenness, with her uncompromising immigration policies earning her the nickname IJzeren Rita (Iron Rita). As a minister, Verdonk enjoyed a rare level of recognition and popularity amongst voters, but was also reviled by many as a populist with an impulsive style of governing. In June 2004 Verdonk was smeared with ketchup by two females protestors in opposition to her stance on immigration as part of a "playful protest", for which they got 11 days of prisontime. After the political murders of politician Pim Fortuyn in 2002 and film director Theo van Gogh in 2004, the Dutch Ministry of Interior Affairs began to monitor Verdonk's security tightly for her own protection. From 4 June 2008, the Dutch Cabinet discontinued the monitoring on the grounds that the threat level had abated.

=== Asylum case of Ayaan Hirsi Ali ===
Earlier in 2006, a TV programme had reported that MP Hirsi Ali had provided false information on her asylum application in 1992 concerning her name, date of birth, and country where she had been residing prior to seeking asylum. Ayaan had much earlier admitted this to her friends and party colleagues (including Verdonk) already, however this was the first time that the story was reported publicly in the media. Additionally the TV programme interviewed members of Hirsi Ali's family and they had denied her earlier claims that she had sought asylum to prevent an arranged marriage that she objected to, stating instead that she had agreed to it. A government investigation raised many questions about the veracity of these claims.

Based on a ruling by the Hoge Raad (Supreme Court), Verdonk said that Hirsi Ali did not have legitimate Dutch citizenship. According to the Hoge Raad, except under very special circumstances, Dutch citizenship could not be granted if the subject had lied about his or her name and date of birth. In a broadcast on the Dutch public network, Hirsi Ali had admitted that she had lied about her name and date of birth in her application, and that she had been living with her family for 12 years in Kenya before arriving in the Netherlands, and had not arrived directly from Somalia, which at that time was experiencing civil war. The decision by Verdonk caused considerable controversy. VVD-deputy prime minister Zalm said he was surprised that events known for years suddenly resulted in action by Verdonk two days after a television program about Hirsi Ali's past. He said Verdonk has disqualified herself from being the prime candidate for the VVD in the coming elections. On 16 May 2006, Ayaan Hirsi Ali who was herself an MP for the VVD, as well as Gerrit Zalm, criticized Verdonk for her decision to revoke Hirsi Ali's passport.

In a session in parliament on the issue of Hirsi Ali's citizenship, Verdonk said that she had no choice but to revoke her passport, as it had been issued under a false name and false date of birth. Some members of parliament suggested that Verdonk's stern actions were a result of her political ambitions in the 2006 VVD leadership elections. The result of the debate was that Verdonk promised to have another look at the case and see if it was possible for Hirsi Ali to keep her citizenship.

On 27 June 2006 Verdonk informed parliament of her decision to allow MP Ayaan Hirsi Ali to keep her Dutch passport after all. According to Verdonk, Hirsi Ali had presented her with new convincing evidence related to her use of her grandfather's surname, and the false date of birth was insufficient grounds to cancel her passport. The next day, during a parliamentary debate took place, minister Verdonk and prime-minister Jan Peter Balkenende were questioned about the decision. At the end of the first period of the debate, the prime minister said that Hirsi Ali had to sign a letter accepting responsibility for her false statements in order to retain her citizenship. Otherwise, the solution would not be acceptable for minister Verdonk.

In the second period of the debate, a vote of no confidence was proposed by the Green Party GroenLinks. It was supported by the Balkenende cabinet coalition partner, Democrats 66 (D66). The vote did not meet the required majority as it was opposed by the right-wing populist LPF. Because a coalition partner supported the motion—a unique situation in Dutch politics—the Balkenende cabinet had to decide if this had consequences for Rita Verdonk as minister, and the second Balkenende cabinet.

Van Beek, an MP for the VVD, said after the debate that it would be almost unthinkable that if Verdonk resigned, the cabinet would stay intact, as one of the coalition partners of the cabinet had lost its confidence in the minister. D66, feeling dissatisfied that minister Verdonk did not resign following the debate, withdrew its support for the cabinet. This resulted in the fall of the cabinet's on 29 June.

=== Outgoing Minister ===
On 30 November 2006 the new parliament was sworn in as the result of elections a week earlier. On 1 November Labour Party leader Wouter Bos proposed a motion for what in effect would constitute an amnesty for an estimated 26,000 asylum seekers who had asked for asylum more than five years ago and had their asylum applications turned down. This motion requested of the cabinet, "in anticipation of a definite discussion on the amnesty by the new House of Representatives, not to take any irreversible measures with respect to this group".

During her tenure as Minister for Immigration, Verdonk had specifically cited the rejection of those 26,000 persons as an example of her toughening of the immigration laws (see Policy below). The motion was passed with a 75–74 majority, the VVD, Prime Minister Balkenende's CDA, and the right-wing PVV and SGP parties dissenting. Both Verdonk, although now considered a 'caretaker', and Prime Minister Balkenende criticized the motion. There was speculation that Verdonk resigned for this reason. On 3 December after several meetings, the cabinet decided not to honor the motion, because an amnesty would be impossible to implement. It agreed to postpone expulsion of asylum seekers until after a special parliamentary session to be held on 12 December.

During this session on 12 December, a motion was proposed by the PvdA asking Verdonk to refrain from acting on expulsions until the new cabinet was formed. This motion was supported by all the left-wing and centre-left parties and it passed with a slim 76–72 majority. Verdonk claimed this motion amounted to a de facto amnesty and affirmed her well-known stance: any amnesty was unenforceable. She declared expulsions would continue after the debate, before cabinet could issue an official statement the next day. Verdonk also refused to postpone those expulsions for another 24 hours until a new debate could take place the next day. In reaction, the whole parliament asked for an official statement from the cabinet that same evening.

Following an additional debate, during which Prime Minister Balkenende said that Verdonk had the full support of the cabinet, a motion of no confidence was accepted by the same coalition of left-wing parties. Before the vote took place, Mark Rutte declared that should Verdonk resign, all VVD ministers would join her. The cabinet was in a 10-hour meeting on 13 December before deciding that all ministers would stay on and that Hirsch Ballin would take over Verdonk's responsibility for immigration. In exchange, Verdonk added Hirsch Ballin's justice department responsibilities over youth care, prevention and probation to her portfolio. Hirsch Ballin could execute the 12 December motion started by the PvdA, and postpone the expulsions of asylum seekers based on humanitarian grounds, such as the responsibility for under-age children, until a new cabinet was formed.

On 22 February 2007 Verdonk stood down as minister when the fourth cabinet Balkenende was installed. Her portfolios were taken over by Ella Vogelaar (integration) and Nebahat Albayrak (immigration).

=== Policy ===
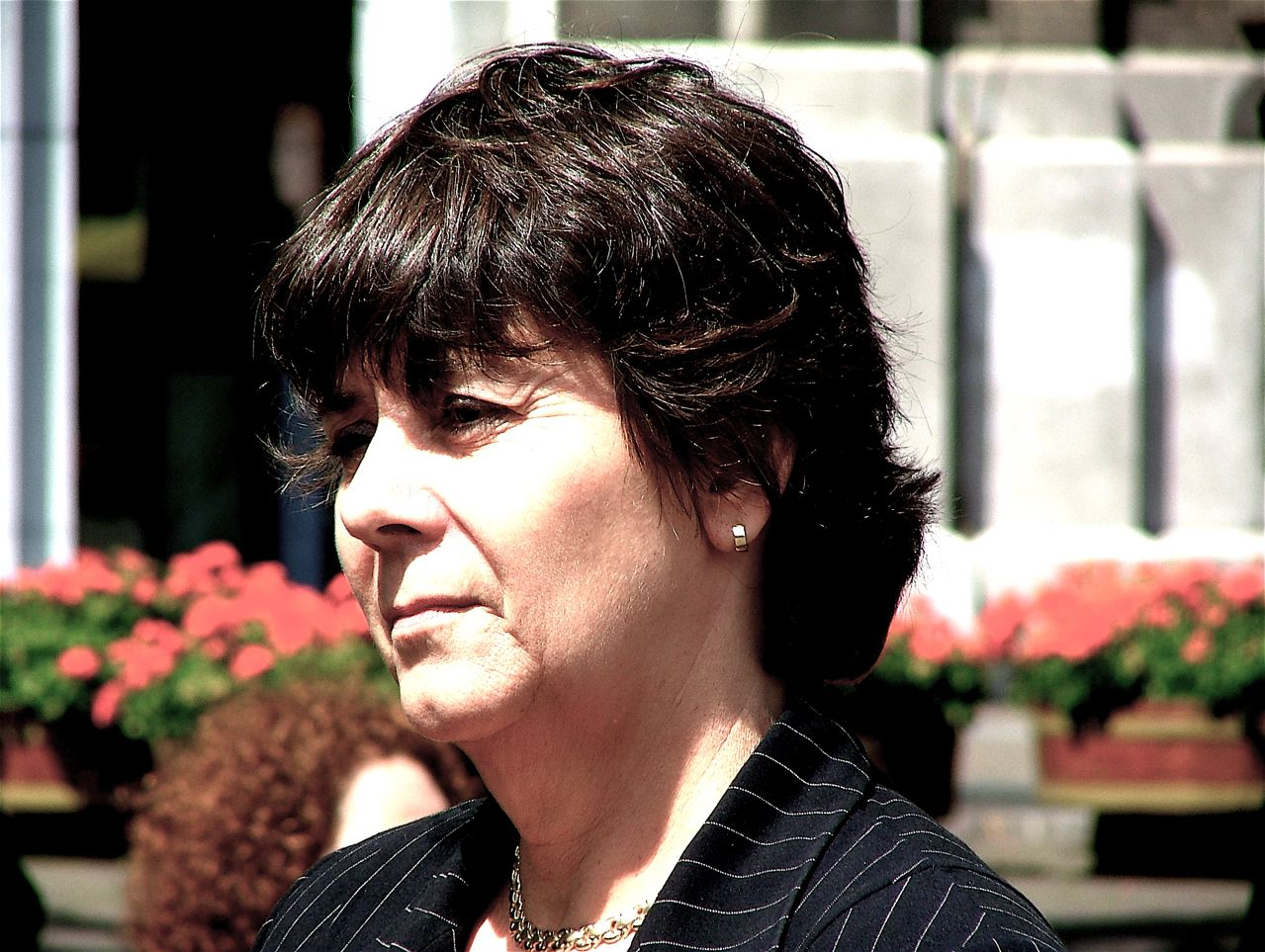
Rita Verdonk in 2007

Verdonk's most discussed propositions and decisions are:

- In order to reduce immigration through marriage, she proposed that partners of Dutch citizens who come from countries outside the EU only be allowed to immigrate into the Netherlands if the Dutch partner earns more than 120% of the minimum income.
- She refused to grant an amnesty to around 26,000 asylum seekers who had their asylum applications turned down but who had been living in the Netherlands for more than 5 years by that time. Since they had entered the Netherlands before the new Foreigner Law, it appeared that a special arrangement was required. Instead of an amnesty, Verdonk chose to deal with these thousands of cases individually.
- To integrate immigrants into the Dutch society, each person who wants to immigrate into the Netherlands must pass an integration test, except for those who come from other European Union-member states, United States, Canada, Japan, Australia and New Zealand (such immigrants must still take a year of integration classes after entry). It tests knowledge of the Dutch language, political system and social conventions. The test must be taken before entering the Netherlands, preferably in a Dutch embassy in the person's country of origin. Immigrants coming from an EU state, the United States, Canada, Japan, Australia and New Zealand cannot take this integration test, even if they want to.
- "Oudkomers", immigrants who have lived in the Netherlands for a long time, but are not "integrated", were requested to take the exam. Verdonk tried to make such tests mandatory also for Dutch nationals who were born and raised outside the Netherlands . The constitutionality of these tests, especially in being applied to oudkomers and Dutch nationals, has been questioned both by the Council of State, which advises government on all proposed laws, and various parties in the parliament, including Verdonk's VVD. These proposals were to be implemented in January 2007.

Minister Verdonk was called to parliament for the following issues:

- In October 2005 it was discovered that civil servants of the Immigration & Naturalisation Services had informed the Congolese embassy and authorities that several of the people sent back to the Democratic Republic of the Congo had applied for asylum in the Netherlands. The Congo had long been struggling with civil war. This information is considered confidential and should not have been disclosed to the Congolese authorities. Verdonk at first denied any wrongdoing, but later admitted that she had lied. In several cases, the Congolese embassy had been informed that several returnees had applied for asylum in the Netherlands. According to members of the opposition, this information could put returnees (in this case to Congo) at risk of torture or other oppression, but no party or organization provided documentation for the claim. Verdonk maintains that no other sensitive information was given to the Congolese authorities, in accordance with the findings of a special committee (Commissie Havermans).
- In December 2005, a cell-complex for denied refugees at Amsterdam Airport burned down after a fire had been started by one of the refugees. Eleven refugees died. Surviving refugees reported that they had to wait more than 45 minutes before being released from their cells. A man suspected of connections with terrorist organizations had escaped in the disruption. Before the fire's investigation was completed, Verdonk stated that prison workers adequately handled the circumstances. Subsequently, in September 2006, she granted temporary stay permits to many of the survivors of the Schiphol airport detention center fire, overriding the regular court hearing procedures.

As a minister, Verdonk has proposed the following, which have not become law:

- In October 2005, a ban on Muslim women wearing the burqa in public places, on the grounds that the burqa, which covers the face, is a security risk since suicide bombers could use it as a disguise. She cancelled a meeting with Dutch Muslim leaders when one (of the 30) would not shake hands with her, because she is a woman. She has said that "the time for cosy tea-drinking" with Muslim groups had passed.
- In January 2006, she proposed the adoption of a national code of conduct, listing the most important conventions of Dutch society, to facilitate the integration of immigrants. She was inspired by a similar initiative undertaken by the city of Rotterdam. One requirement would be that everyone agreed to speak only Dutch in the streets.
- Upon receiving Dutch citizenship, immigrants would have to sing the first stanza of the national anthem, the "Wilhelmus."
- In March 2006, Verdonk considered returning homosexual asylum seekers to Iran because she understood they were no longer being prosecuted. The general public conception was that acts of homosexuality were still punishable by death. She noted that homosexuality in itself was not punishable by death sentence in Iran. In response to parliamentary criticism, the Minister announced on 4 March that all asylum cases involving homosexual Iranians would be assessed on an individual basis. Her proposed policy initially earned her selection for the Human Rights Watch Hall of Shame.

Verdonk strictly applied the Alien Integration Act of 1998 (Wet Inburgering Nieuwkomers), which was introduced by Job Cohen, the social democratic State Secretary for Justice in the Cabinet Kok II.

=== Criticism ===
- Verdonk's expulsion policies were criticised in the TV series, 26,000 gezichten (26,000 faces), in which the personal lives of many of these people were shown, in hopes that public opinion would change when viewers saw that these 26,000 were mostly ordinary, friendly people.
- In January 2006, Verdonk received the negative Dutch Big Brother Award for "promoting privacy violations".
- In Amnesty International's magazine Wordt Vervolgd, Ruud Lubbers, a former three-time prime minister and UN High Commissioner For Refugees, said that "Verdonk should not finish her job" and "The Netherlands is in a spasm (...) It would help if we could 'de-Verdonk' the situation".
- In December 2006, Verdonk was elected 'worst politician' by her colleague members of parliament, in a poll by the current affairs television program EenVandaag; qualified her as an 'elephant in a china cabinet' (a Dutch expression similar to the English idiom 'a bull in a china shop'), ruthless and incompetent. In a similar poll, EenVandaag viewers ranked Verdonk in second place on both the 'best politician' and 'worst politician' lists.

== 2006 bid for VVD leadership ==
On 4 April 2006, Verdonk announced her ambition to become political leader and to succeed Jozias van Aartsen as the lead candidate of the VVD for the coming elections, at the time expected to be held 2006. Her direct competitors in the leadership election were staatssecretaris of Education Mark Rutte and MP Jelleke Veenendaal. Although her political views on subjects other than immigration and integration had mostly been unclear, she was a likely candidate. Shortly after announcing she would be candidate, a poll for the RTL 4 News estimated that 56% of the people preferred Verdonk as the leader of the VVD. Verdonk was advised by Kay van de Linde, who had been part of anti-immigration politician Pim Fortuyn's 2002 election campaign, which was cut short by his assassination on 6 May of that year. Verdonk's opponents said that several of her statements and policies seemed to exploit xenophobic emotions in the country. On an official visit to Morocco, when visiting a poor neighbourhood, she remarked, "I do not understand why these Moroccans come to the Netherlands. There is so much work to do here".

On 31 May 2006, Verdonk lost to Mark Rutte in the 2006 VVD leadership election, gaining 46% of the vote, less than the majority required.

De Telegraaf reported on 23 June 2006 that Verdonk discussed policies with Marco Pastors of Leefbaar Rotterdam. The news report fueled fears that Verdonk might leave the VVD in order to form a new right-wing political party allied with Leefbaar Rotterdam and Lijst Pim Fortuyn. Verdonk denied the rumour

In the 2006 election, Verdonk received a greater number of preference votes (620,555) than the VVD lead candidate Mark Rutte (553,200). As a result, on 28 November she held a press conference in which she urged the party to rethink their policies via a special committee. She renewed her desire to become party leader but said she would for the present remain loyal to Rutte. A few hours later on 28 November after meeting with the party, she withdrew both ideas. Chances of Verdonk to become party leader decreased with this action, described as an "attempted coup" by media and party members.

On 20 January 2007 NRC Handelsblad profiled Verdonk (caption: The Netherlands at my feet), observing that her election-campaign team was not resolved. It said that she was still determined to grab the VVD leadership, possibly right after the March provincial 2007 elections, in the event that her opponent Rutte again performed poorly.

=== Controversies ===
In the HP/De Tijd issue of 5 June 2007, Verdonk said the following about Mark Rutte: "He is a decent VVD member, but he's not really right-wing. I really can't see how he would be." Rutte objected to this statement, but the prominent VVD elder statesman Hans Wiegel defended Verdonk. Verdonk finally apologised for her statement. After the controversy, the popularity of the VVD in the opinion polls decreased. Rutte gave Verdonk a final warning and said that VVD members had to "obey or get lost".

Around 21 June 2007, Radboud Magazine published an interview with Verdonk, in which she said that the VVD was "hijacked" by "left-wing liberals", and that she wanted to "undo" that. Although Rutte had warned her before, he didn't take any action, because the interview had been done in April before his warning.

== Member of the Parliament ==
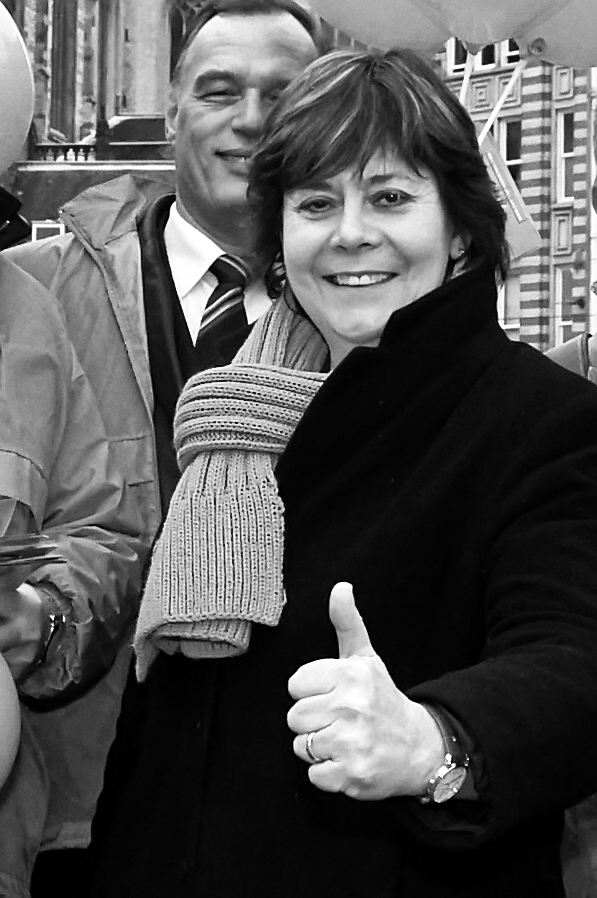
Rita Verdonk on the website of Proud of the Netherlands.

From November 2006 until September 2007, Verdonk served as member of parliament for the VVD in the opposition benches as the education specialist.

On 13 September 2007, Verdonk criticised the direction of the VVD again. She said that the VVD was "invisible" in the debate about immigration. The party met to decide on the fate of Verdonk. Rutte said he wanted to expel her. Later that afternoon, news reports confirmed that Verdonk had been expelled. Rutte said that "Verdonk had damaged the reputation of the VVD due to remarks in the media far too often". Verdonk said she would continue in the House of Representatives and that she would not give up her seat. She also confirmed that she would not join the Partij voor de Vrijheid. Geert Wilders, leader of the PVV, was disappointed by this comment and said he still wanted to speak with Verdonk about a possible joint party. Prominent VVD members such as Hans Wiegel and Frans Weisglas spoke of a "disastrous" decision by Rutte.

The next day, Verdonk said that she still needed some more time to think over her decision again, but Rutte declined this, and she was formally expelled from the parliamentary faction of the VVD on 14 September 2007. In October 2007, the VVD party board gave her the option of either giving up her parliamentary seat, or face exclusion procedures from the party. Verdonk announced that she would leave the party but stay in Parliament. After further consideration, she announced the creation of a new political movement, Proud of the Netherlands (Trots op NL), which she launched in April 2008.

According to opinion polls published on 6 December 2009, Verdonk's movement, Trots op NL, would win one seat in the Dutch parliament. In the 2010 elections Trots won no seat. She resigned from politics in 2011. The party has combined with another party on the right.

== Decorations ==
Honours
Ribbon bar	Honour	Country	Date	Comment
	Officer of the Order of Orange-Nassau	Netherlands	11 April 2007	

Party political offices
New political party	Leader of Proud of the Netherlands; 2007–2011	Succeeded by Hero Brinkman
New political party	Chair of Proud of the Netherlands; 2007–2011	Succeeded by Theo Reijnen
New political party	Parliamentary leader in the House of Representatives; 2007–2010	Party lost representation
Political offices
Preceded by Hilbrand Nawijn	Minister for Integration and Asylum Affairs; 2003–2006	Succeeded by Herself as Minister for Integration, Rehabilitation, Prevention, Youth Justice
Preceded by Herself as Minister for Integration and Asylum Affairs	Minister for Integration, Rehabilitation, Prevention, Youth Justice; 2006–2007	Office discontinued
Preceded by Piet Hein Donner	Minister of Justice; Ad interim 2006	Succeeded by Ernst Hirsch Ballin
