= 2006 People's Party for Freedom and Democracy leadership election =

31 May 2006	2023 →
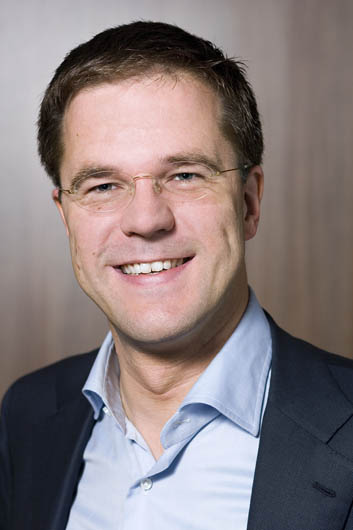

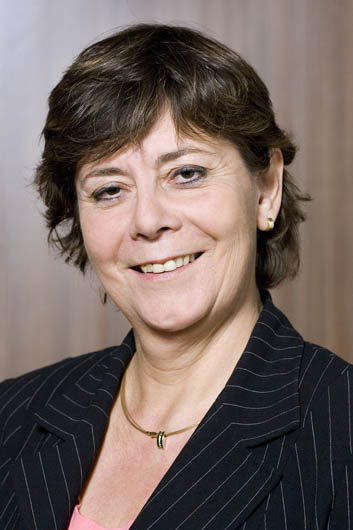

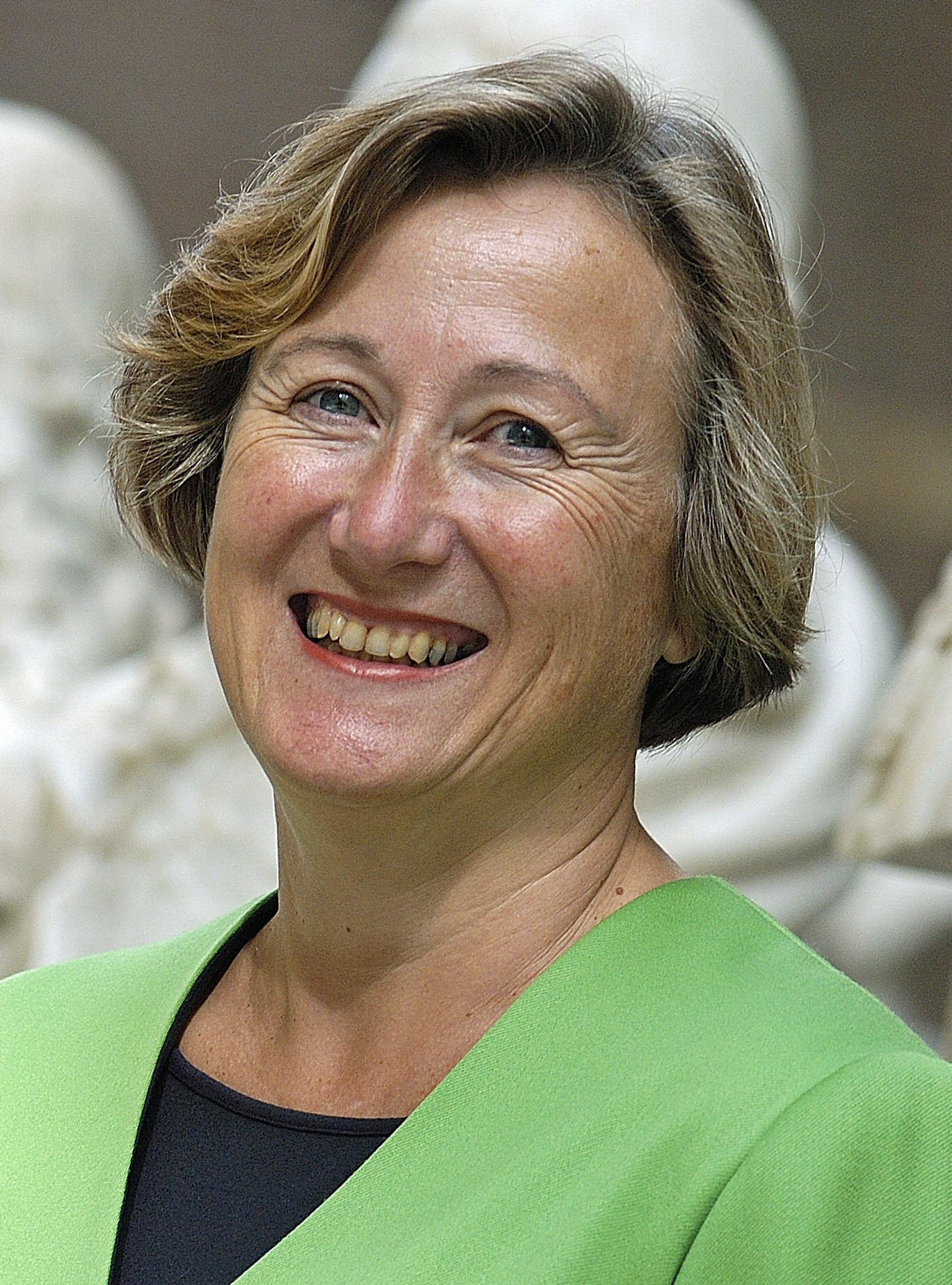
Candidate	Mark Rutte	Rita Verdonk	Jelleke Veenendaal
Popular vote	14,777	13,131	803
Percentage	51.5%	45.5%	3.0%
Leader before election
Jozias van Aartsen
Leader-elect
Mark Rutte

The 2006 People's Party for Freedom and Democracy leadership election was called to elect the new Leader of the People's Party for Freedom and Democracy after incumbent Jozias van Aartsen announced his retirement from national politics. Mark Rutte the State Secretary for Education, Culture and Science closely beat Rita Verdonk the Minister for Integration, Immigration and Asylum Affairs and backbencher Member of the House of Representatives Jelleke Veenendaal.

== Background ==
After the 2006 municipal elections Jozias van Aartsen stepped down as Parliamentary leader in the House of Representatives and announced that he would not be top candidate for the next elections. The VVD leadership had consciously campaigned in the municipal election on a national ticket. The party however did not reach the set goal of 15% of the votes and actually lost 1.5% of the votes. To fill his position of political leader of the VVD, an internal election was scheduled.

== Candidates ==
Candidate	Born	Position(s) at that time	Former position(s)	Notable endorsements	Views
Mark Rutte	14 February 1967 (age 39)	State Secretary for Education, Culture and Science (since 2004)	State Secretary for Social; Affairs and Employment (2002–2004); Member of the House of Representatives (2003)	Gerrit Zalm; Frank de Grave; Ivo Opstelten; Henk Kamp; Ed Nijpels; Jan van Zanen; Hans Hoogervorst	Liberalism; Centre-right
Rita Verdonk	18 October 1955 (age 50)	Minister for Integration, Immigration and Asylum Affairs (since 2003)		Frits Bolkestein; Hans Wiegel; Neelie Kroes; Frans Weisglas; Ayaan Hirsi Ali	Conservatism; Right-wing
Jelleke Veenendaal	15 December 1953 (age 52)	Member of the House of Representatives (since 2003)			

Three VVD members put forth their candidacy.

- Mark Rutte: the current State Secretary for Education, Culture and Science was the first to put forth his candidacy. His candidacy was backed by the VVD leadership, including the party board. Rutte was the former chairman of the VVD's youth organisation, the Youth Organisation Freedom and Democracy and was also backed by them. After studying history and leading the JOVD Rutte became manager for Unilever. In 2002 he became State Secretary for Social Affairs and Employment. After a cabinet reshuffle he became State Secretary for Education, Culture and Science. Rutte was generally perceived to be on the progressive side of the VVD. He promised "to make the VVD a party for everyone and not just of the elite". His youthful and charismatic appearance have been likened to the leader of the Labour Party Wouter Bos. Rutte was coordinator of the municipal election campaign of the VVD, which caused Van Aartsen's downfall.
- Jelleke Veenendaal: she quite unexpectedly put forth her candidacy. She has only been a Member of the House of Representatives since 2003. Before that she worked as medical analyst and a management consultant. In parliament she has been a backbencher. She entered the race when only Rutte was candidate, claiming that without a counter-candidate, the race would be a sham. She entered the race without consulting the party board, though she did consult her husband. She was generally seen as having no chance to win the elections.
- Rita Verdonk: the current Minister for Integration, Immigration and Asylum Affairs was last to put forth her candidacy, after a lot of attention from the media. Her candidacy was not backed by the VVD leadership. She was often polled as the most popular minister within the cabinet and was backed by many individual VVD members. Verdonk entered politics in 2003, when she became minister, she had only been member of the VVD for three years, she had been active within the Pacifist Socialist Party and had voted for the Labour Party before 2002. Verdonk was generally seen to be representative to the conservative and populist wing of the VVD. She has proposed cutting taxes and has appealed to the entrepreneurial spirit. She was known as 'Iron Rita', for her stances on immigration and integration and her steadfast politics. She has recruited former Kay van der Linden as her campaign manager, who was also involved in Pim Fortuyn's 2002 election campaign. Verdonk has never been a Member of the House of Representatives and could therefore according to Dutch law not enter parliament if she would have won the internal election.

== Results ==
An independent committee oversaw the elections. 28,788 people voted in this election, which was 74% of the eligible VVD members. They voted mostly by telephone and via Internet. The full results were presented on May 31, 2006, in Hotel Okura in Amsterdam, where it was announced that Mark Rutte obtained 51.5% of the vote and won the election. Rita Verdonk came in second, with 45.5% of the vote. Jelleke Veenendaal obtained 3.0% of the vote.

It is generally expected that Mark Rutte will step down as staatssecretaris and become fractievoorzitter of the VVD parliamentary party because according to the VVD's Liberal Manifesto the party's leader should either be Prime Minister of the Netherlands or the Parliamentary leader in the House of Representatives.
