= Annette Nijs =

Dutch politician (born 1961)

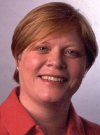
Annette Nijs

Anette Dorothea Sophia Maria Nijs (born 16 December 1961) is a retired Dutch politician of the People's Party for Freedom and Democracy (VVD). She was the State Secretary for Education, Culture and Science in the Cabinets Balkenende I and II serving from 22 July 2002 until 9 June 2004. She was a Member of the House of Representatives from 30 January 2003 until 27 May 2003 and from 7 June 2005 until 30 November 2006.

== Publications ==
She published her second book on China called ‘The China Factor' in English in the summer of 2019. Her first book on China ‘China through different eyes’ was published in 2009 in Dutch in her home country, The Netherlands.

== Awards ==
Nijs received the Knighthood of Orange-Nassau, a royal award from The Netherlands in 2004. She also received the Chinese Government Friendship Award in 2015 – the highest recognition from the Chinese Central Government for foreigners, who have made a special contribution to China.
