= List of organisations designated as terrorist by the European Union =

The European Union has two lists of designated terrorist organisations that provide for different sanctions for the two groups. The first list is copied from the United Nations and relates to EU external terrorist organisations, and the second is an autonomous list and relates to EU internal terrorist organisations. There is a specific process for adding or removing an organisation from the list.

== Autonomous list ==
All other designated organisations.

- the freezing of all funds, other financial assets and economic resources.
- a ban on directly or indirectly making funds, other financial assets and economic resources available.

Sanctions are only applicable to EU-external groups regardless of designation. For example, 47 groups are listed as terrorist organisations in the EU but sanctions are only applied to 27 of these. Member States do have an obligation to assist each other in preventing and combating terrorist acts but this is the only action that follows from the designation of an EU-internal organisation.

- European Union list of terrorist groups and individuals, 26 July 2024.

== Listing process ==
New organisations are added to the autonomous list following this process:

1. "Designation": Member states and third party states tips about an organisation. This state must have solid evidence and the tip must be sent by the national authority.
2. Scrutinity: The Presidency, or a delegation, gathers basic information, and might require more information from the tipping state.
3. Consultations: Information is shared with other member states for discussion. Everything is still confidential. 15 days after, delegates of the states meet as the CP 931 Working Party, Europol is sometimes invited too.
4. Recommendation: The CP 931 Working Party prepares the listing decision.
5. Decision by EU Council: The council adopts the list. The decision must be unanimous, which means that every state has a veto right.
6. Official Publishing: In the EU Official Journal
7. Notification and Statement of Reason: The council secretariat notifies each designated organisation via mail, together with instructions on how to get the decision to be reconsidered.

== Delisting process ==
The EU has similar process to review the list, and to remove organisations for the list.

== List of EU external designated terrorist groups ==
As of 26 July 2024, the list is:

1. Abu Nidal Organisation
2. al-Aqsa Martyrs' Brigades
3. al-Aqsa e.V
4. Babbar Khalsa
5. Communist Party of the Philippines (including New People's Army)
6. Directorate for Internal Security of the Iranian Ministry for Intelligence and Security
7. al-Gama'a al-Islamiyya
8. Great Eastern Islamic Raiders' Front
9. Hamas, including Izz ad-Din al-Qassam Brigades
10. Hezbollah (Military Wing) (including the External Security Organisation)
11. Hizbul Mujahideen
12. Khalistan Zindabad Force
13. Kurdistan Workers' Party (PKK)
14. Liberation Tigers of Tamil Eelam
15. National Liberation Army (Colombia)
16. Palestinian Islamic Jihad
17. Popular Front for the Liberation of Palestine
18. Popular Front for the Liberation of Palestine – General Command
19. Revolutionary People's Liberation Party/Front
20. Shining Path
21. Kurdistan Freedom Hawks
22. The Base (neo-Nazi group)
