= Ronald Sørensen =

Dutch politician & historian (born 1947)

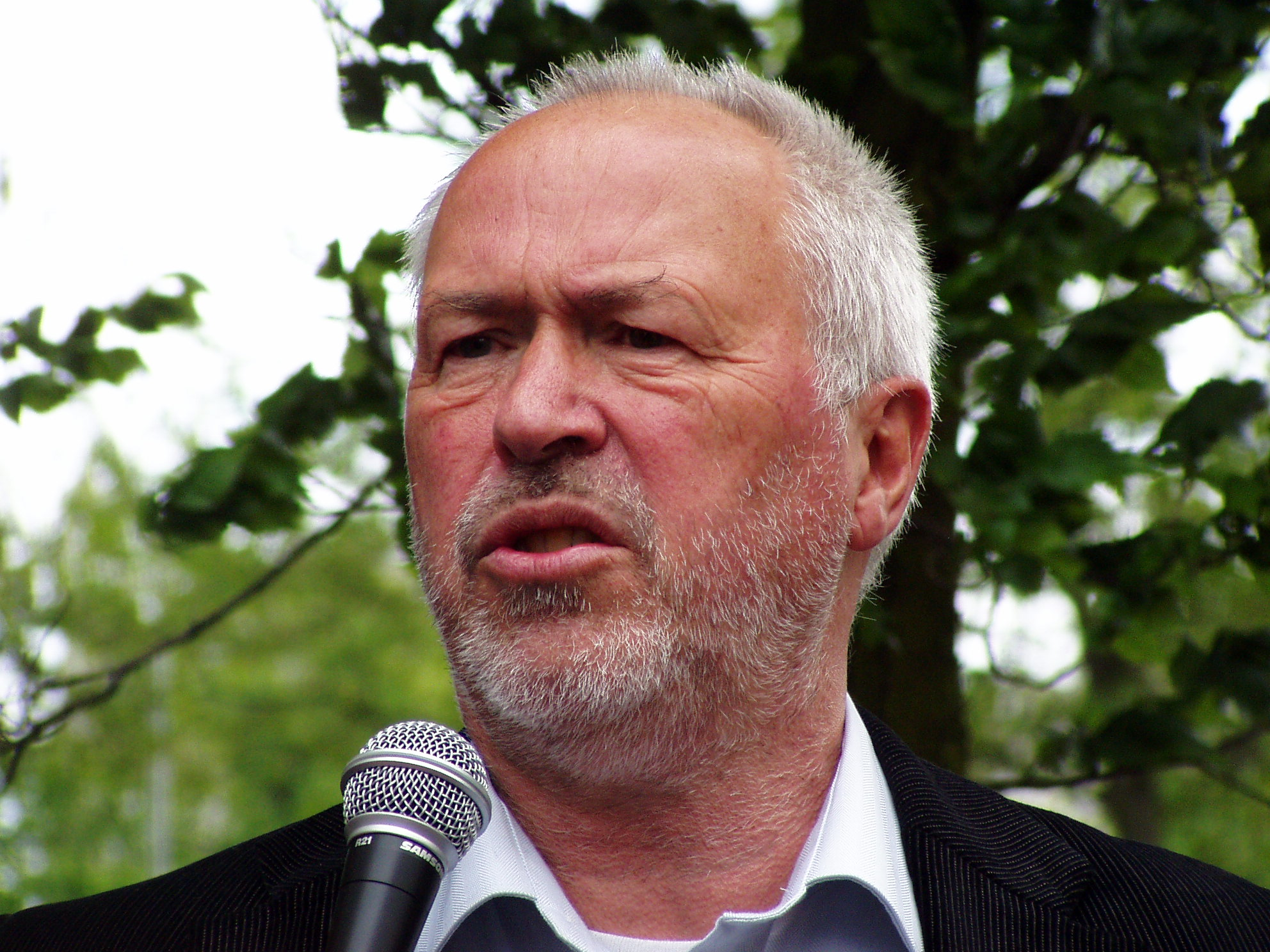
- Ronald Sørensen in 2009

Member of the Senate
- In office 7 June 2011 – 9 June 2015

Personal details
- Born: 4 May 1947 (age 78) Rotterdam, Netherlands
- Party: Livable Rotterdam (since 2001); JA21 (since 2021)
- Other political affiliations: PvdA (1970s); Livable South Holland (2003–2011); One NL (2006); PVV (2011–2015); FvD (2017–2020)
- Occupation: Teacher • Politician

Ronald Sørensen (born 4 May 1947) is a Dutch politician. He was a founder of the Livable Rotterdam party and also served in the Senate for the Party for Freedom between 2011 and 2015.

== Early life ==
Sørensen is of Norwegian descent. He obtained an M.A. in history from Utrecht University. Before he became politically active he was a history and biology teacher.

== Political career ==
He co-founded the Livable Rotterdam party and was an early associate of the politician Pim Fortuyn, who was assassinated in 2002. Sørensen asked Fortuyn to lead the Livable Rotterdam party into the 2002 municipal election during which the party saw success and ousted the governing Labour Party.

From 2002 to 2011 he was a member of the municipal council of Rotterdam on behalf of Livable Rotterdam, as well as fraction leader from 2002 to 2010, and from 2007 to 2011 he was a member of the States-Provincial of South Holland on behalf of Livable Zuid-Holland.

Sørensen was a candidate for the Party for Freedom (PVV) in the 2011 Dutch Senate election. On 7 June 2011 he was installed as a member of the Senate and served in this role before retiring in 2015. He served until 9 June 2015.

In 2017, he became a member of the Forum for Democracy (FvD) party founded by Thierry Baudet. He later joined its offshoot JA21 founded by fellow Livable politician Joost Eerdmans.

== Bibliography ==
- Een gehate minderheid: NSB'ers in Rotterdam, 2003, Rotterdam – Speakers Academy, ISBN 90-806300-7-1
- Nu ik het opschrijf, word ik weer boos, 2011, Rotterdam, ISBN 9789081729017
