= Zvonař =

Zvonař is a Czech surname. Notable people with the surname include:

- Josef Leopold Zvonař (1824–1865), Czech composer, pedagogue, and music critic
- Karel Zvonař (1912–1994), Czech wrestler
- Milos Zvonar (born 1937), Czech-Dutch anesthetist and politician

== See also ==
- Ján Zvonár (1951–2023), Slovak physician and politician
- Zvonar, a name of central European origin including a list of notable people
