= Anton van Schijndel =

Dutch politician

Member of the House of Representatives
- In office 2005–2006

Member of the municipal council of Amsterdam
- Incumbent
- Assumed office 2018

Personal details
- Born: 12 January 1960 (age 66) Amsterdam, Netherlands
- Party: Forum for Democracy
- Other political affiliations: VVD (1994-2006); One NL (2006-2007)

Anton Van Schijndel (born January 12, 1960) is a Dutch politician. He was a member of parliament in the House of Representatives from 2005 to 2006, initially for the VVD and later for One NL. He later became a member of the Forum for Democracy and currently sits with the party on the municipal council of Amsterdam.

== Biography ==
Van Schijndel studied law at the University of Amsterdam and obtained a master's degree in international relations from Columbia University in New York. In the 1990s he worked as a lawyer in New York and Amsterdam. Van Schijndel entered the House of Representatives in 2005 as a member of the VVD, succeeding Jan Rijpstra. In parliament, he focused on matters relating to policing, European rules, the Dutch Constitution, AIVD and national security.

Van Schijndel emerged as a supporter of Rita Verdonk in the party. He was also opposed to Turkey joining the European Union and disagreed with the VVD's course under Mark Rutte. As a result, he left the party to form the Eerdmans-Van Schijndel Group with former Pim Fortuyn List MP Joost Eerdmans and later founded with the One NL party with Eerdmans and Marco Pastors. The party contested in the 2006 general election but did not win any seats. As a result, Van Schijndel left parliament. He subsequently lived and worked in Brazil setting up partnerships and exchange programs between Dutch and Brazilian universities. In 2017, he made a return to Dutch politics when he was elected to the municipal council of Amsterdam for the Forum for Democracy party.

In March 2022, Van Schijndel was re-elected to the Amsterdam Municipal Council, meeting "Five more years!".

== Electoral history ==
Electoral history of Anton van Schijndel
Year	Body	Party	Pos.	Votes	Result		Ref.
Year	Body	Party	Pos.	Votes	Party seats	Individual	Ref.
2002	House of Representatives	VVD	52	3,439	24	Lost	
2003	House of Representatives	VVD	40	12,731	28	Lost (Note: Van Schijndel was appointed to the body later during the term due to a vacancy.)	
2006	House of Representatives	One NL	7	191	0	Lost	
2021	House of Representatives	FVD	49	62	8	Lost	
2023	House of Representatives	FVD	15	38	3	Lost	
2024	European Parliament	FVD	26	79	0	Lost	
2025	House of Representatives	FVD	48	27	7	Lost	
