= Zvonar =

Zvonar is a surname of central European origin. Notable people with the surname include:

- Elizabeth Zvonar (born 1972), Canadian artist
- Milos Zvonar (born 1937), Czech-Dutch anesthetist and politician

== See also ==
- Ján Zvonár (1951–2023), Slovak physician and politician
- Zvonař, a Czech surname including a list of notable people
