= Vic Bonke =

Dutch politician (1940–2022)

Felix Ignatius Maria (Vic) Bonke

Member of the House of Representatives
- In office 2002–2003

Personal details
- Born: 2 January 1940 Amsterdam
- Died: 14 February 2022 (aged 82) Amstelveen
- Party: Pim Fortuyn List; Liveable Netherlands
- Occupation: Physiologist, politician

Felix Ignatius Maria (Vic) Bonke (2 January 1940 - 14 February 2022) was a former Dutch politician who was a member of the Member of the House of Representatives for the Pim Fortuyn List from 2002 to 2003.

Bonke worked as a professor at Maastricht University from 1985 to 1991, during which he became friends with Pim Fortuyn, and was emeritus professor of physiology and former rector of the University of Limburg.

Bonke was a member of the Liveable Netherlands party but joined Fortuyn's LPF. He was elected to parliament for the LPF at the 2002 Dutch general election. He was one of four medical specialists elected as an MP for the party, along with Gerlof Jukema and Milos Zvonar. When infighting broke out among LPF members, Bonke attempted to play a mediating role. Bonke was not reelected in 2003.

Bonke died in Amstelveen on 14 February 2022 at the age of 82.
