= Nassau College =

Nassau College may refer to:

- Nassau Community College, a 2-year college in East Garden City, Long Island, New York
- Nassau College – Hofstra Memorial of New York University at Hempstead, Long Island, the former name of Hofstra University/NYU extension
- Nassau Hall, the oldest building on Princeton University's campus
- Queen's College, Nassau, the oldest private school in the Bahamas
- Christelijk College Nassau-Veluwe, a school in Harderwijk, The Netherlands
