= 2006 Dutch general election =

- 22 November 2006
- All 150 seats in the House of Representatives; 76 seats needed for a majority
- Turnout: 80.35% (▲0.31pp)
Party	Leader	Vote %	Seats	+/–
CDA	Jan Peter Balkenende	26.51	41	−3
PvdA	Wouter Bos	21.19	33	−9
SP	Jan Marijnissen	16.58	25	+16
VVD	Mark Rutte	14.67	22	−6
PVV	Geert Wilders	5.89	9	New
GL	Femke Halsema	4.60	7	−1
CU	André Rouvoet	3.97	6	+3
D66	Alexander Pechtold	1.96	3	−3
PvdD	Marianne Thieme	1.83	2	New
SGP	Bas van der Vlies	1.56	2	0
This lists parties that won seats. See the complete results below.
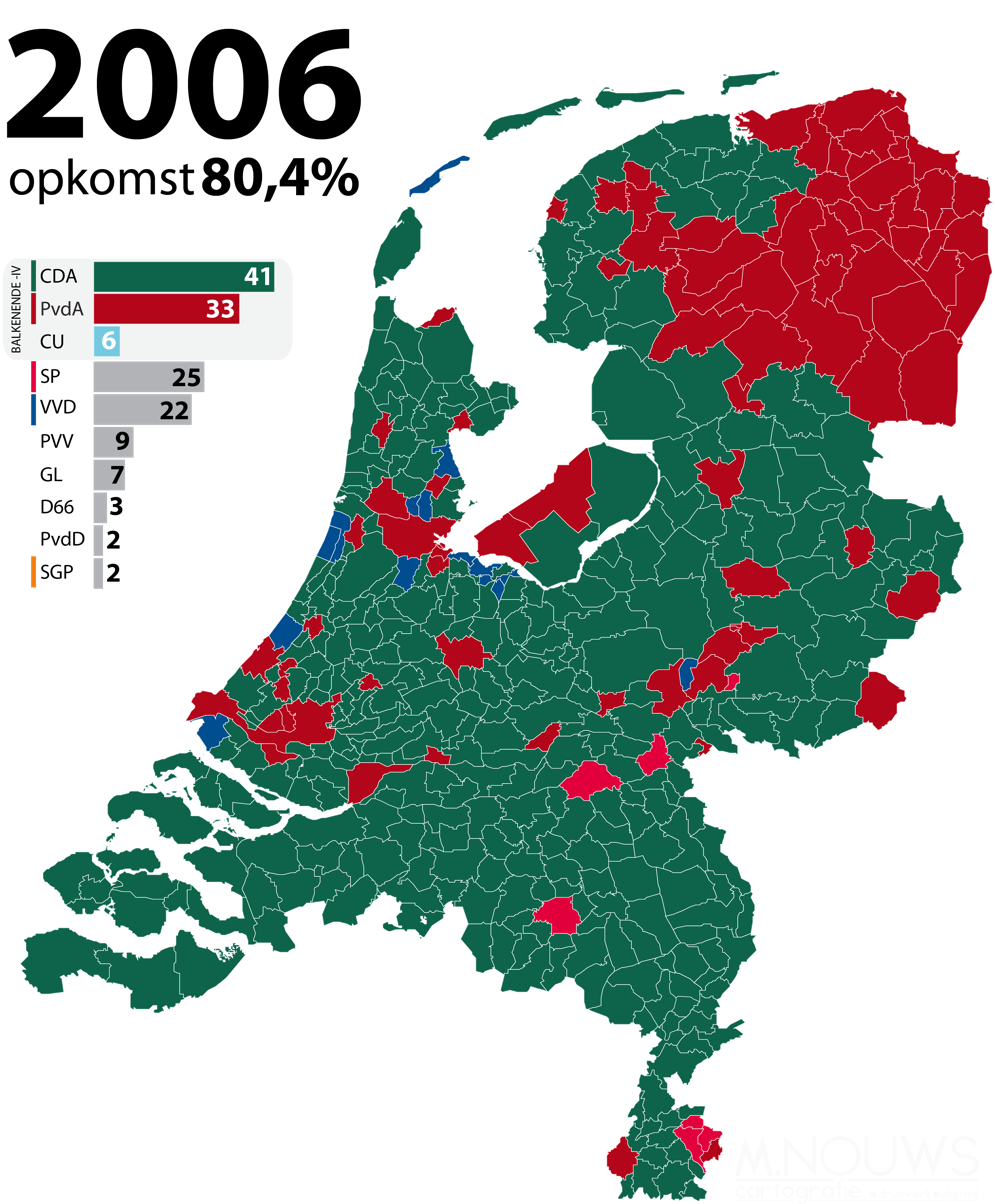
Strongest political party by municipality
Cabinet before	Cabinet after
Third Balkenende cabinet CDA–VVD	Fourth Balkenende cabinet CDA–PvdA–CU

General elections were held in the Netherlands on 22 November 2006, following the fall of the Second Balkenende cabinet. The election proved relatively successful for the governing Christian Democratic Appeal (CDA) which remained the largest party with 41 seats, a loss of only three seats. The largest increase in seats was for the Socialist Party (SP), which went from nine to 25 seats. The main opposition party, the social democratic Labour Party (PvdA) lost nine of its 42 seats, while the right-liberal People's Party for Freedom and Democracy (VVD) and the progressive liberal Democrats 66 lost a considerable portion of their seats, six of 28 and three of six, respectively. New parties, such as the right-wing Party for Freedom (PVV) of former VVD MP Geert Wilders and the animal rights party Party for the Animals (PvdD) were also successful, with the PVV winning nine seats and the PvdD winning two, thereby becoming the first animal rights group to enter a European parliament.

The government formation talks led to the installation of the Christian-social fourth Balkenende cabinet, composed of the CDA, PvdA and the Christian Union on 22 February 2007. As of 2026 the fourth Balkenende cabinet remains the only cabinet between 1994 and 2025 with the People's Party for Freedom and Democracy (VVD) not as part of the government.

== Background ==
=== Internal elections ===
In the month before the fall of the cabinet, two parties held internal elections on who would lead their parties in the next election, which were scheduled for 2007. In the internal election of the conservative-liberal VVD, the more liberal State Secretary for Science and Higher education Mark Rutte beat the more conservative Minister without portfolio for Immigration and Integration Rita Verdonk. In the internal election of the progressive liberal D66 the more radical democratic minister without portfolio for government reform Alexander Pechtold beat the more social liberal chair of the parliamentary party Lousewies van der Laan.

=== Fall of the Cabinet ===
The next general election was originally scheduled for 15 May 2007 as parliament was to be dissolved on 2 April 2007. However, it was announced that election would be held on 22 November 2006, as Prime Minister Jan Peter Balkenende offered the resignation of the cabinet on 30 June 2006 after one of the coalition partners, D66, withdrew its support from the cabinet the day before over Rita Verdonk's treatment of the Ayaan Hirsi Ali case. A new cabinet continued for five months as a caretaker government until the election. The opposition had pressed for an election as soon as possible because they were on a winning streak. The late date for the election probably worked to the advantage of the CDA because in those five months the economy improved and in the past the biggest coalition partner had always come out as the biggest party if the economy blooms. A major issue in the campaigns was whether this improving economy was because of or in spite of the right-wing government.

=== Splintered Fortuynists ===
After the fall of the cabinet several new small right-wing and conservative parties announced that they would contest the general election. Most of these parties either emerged from the remains of Pim Fortuyn's populist Pim Fortuyn List (LPF) or split from the conservative liberal VVD, and were inspired by Fortuyn's ideas. In the period before the election the small right was characterized by a chaos of secessions, new formations and party switches. Former Rotterdam alderman Marco Pastors and member of parliament for the LPF Joost Eerdmans formed Eén NL which emulated Fortuyn's policies. The right-wing Party for the Netherlands was led by former LPF minister Hilbrand Nawijn. Former VVD MP Geert Wilders recruited people for his new Party for Freedom, which would take part in the 2006 election. Nawijn and Wilders had become independent in parliament at that time before the election, while Eerdmans has formed the "Group Eerdmans-Van Schijndel" along with former VVD MP Anton van Schijndel. Two other LPF politicians had formed one man fractions but they did not form their own party: Gerard van As, former leader of the LPF, and Gonny van Oudenallen, also former LPF. Margot Kraneveldt left the LPF, resigned her seat and joined the social democratic PvdA. Meanwhile, the LPF announced that it would also contest the next election under the name "List 5 Fortuyn". The party was led by Olaf Stuger, who served as member of parliament in the period 2002–2003 and returned to parliament in 2006 to replace Gerard van As.

=== Exodus of prominent politicians ===
Several prominent politicians announced they would step down before the election. Some commentators spoke of a large exodus. Within the liberal VVD former chair of the parliamentary party Jozias van Aartsen announced he would retire, as did his vice-chair Bibi de Vries, speaker of parliament Frans Weisglas, ministers Hans Hoogervorst, Sybilla Dekker, state secretary Melanie Schultz van Haegen and Henk van Hoof. Within the CDA, ministers Cees Veerman and Karla Peijs announced they would not return, as did state secretary Clemence Ross. Both D66's current chairperson Lousewies van der Laan and her predecessor Boris Dittrich also announced they would not return.

=== Turkish-Dutch candidates and the Armenian genocide ===
On 26 September 2006 a candidate for the Labour Party, Erdinç Saçan, was removed by his party, because he would not hold to the party stance that the Armenian genocide was caused by the Young Turks. That same evening, the CDA announced that two of their candidates, Ayhan Tonca and Osman Elmaci, have been removed as well, because of the same issue. Both parties agreed that all their members should openly conform to the party's point of view on this sensitive human rights issue. The sensitivity over these issues was underlined when the speaker of the Turkish parliament, Bülent Arınç, in response threatened the Netherlands with diplomatic action over this incident. Namik Tan, spokesperson for the Turkish Department of Foreign Affairs said that "we are deeply worried about the one-sided approach of our ally Netherlands’ political parties on the so-called Armenian genocide as this puts a limit on the freedom of expression." Labour Party leader Wouter Bos later said that the term genocide is used too easily, and that he rather speak of the "Armenian Question."

=== News of possible mistreatment of Iraqi prisoners in 2003 ===
A week before the election, De Volkskrant newspaper published a story saying that Dutch soldiers had "tortured" Iraqi prisoners in Iraq back in 2003. Defence minister Henk Kamp ordered an immediate (re-)investigation into the matter, but said that earlier information about this case did not result in the military police and Dutch public prosecutors to start a criminal investigation. Left-wing parties, such as the Labour Party (PvdA), which demanded an immediate parliamentary investigation were later rebuked by military commander Dick Berlijn, who stated that the left-wing opposition tarnished the reputation of the Dutch Department of Defense by their incriminating language, while nothing happened in Iraq. Mark Rutte, leader of the VVD, said that this Iraq story was a manipulation in order to influence the election. In an open letter to De Volkskrant on the day of the Dutch election, defence minister Kamp said the news about possible mistreatment was deceptive, and that the editor of De Volkskrant should feel being misused by the sources for this story. The Department of Defense in the meantime is demanding a rectification of the story published by De Volkskrant.

In January 2007, the magazine Elsevier reported that the no.5 candidate of the Labour Party (PvdA), Ton Heerts, had "advised" De Volkskrant on how to report on the story.

=== Voting tools ===
Several organisations launched a voting tool which helped voters to decide between the multitude of parties. The Institute for Public and Politics (IPP), a government agency, published VoteMatch. VoteMatch presented thirty propositions like "Citizens should elect the Prime Minister." and voters could show their support for these propositions by clicking either "agree", "don't agree" or "don't know". VoteMatch then showed to which extent the voter agreed with each party, showing them from most to least similarity in answers, advising the voter to vote for the party which agreed with them most. VoteMatch had also been made for general, European, provincial and municipal elections since 1989.

Kieskompas (Electoral Compass) was launched by the newspaper Trouw in cooperation with the Vrije Universiteit Amsterdam in order to compete with the Stemwijzer. This system was supposed to give considerably more information. Here voters could show their support for thirty six propositions on a five-point scale. Next they show whether they thought the current cabinet had performed well. Finally Kieskompas showed users their attitude towards party leaders as competent and trustworthy. The voters were shown a two-axis system (similar to a Nolan Chart) and their own position as well as the position of each party in this chart. It stated which party was the closest to them and which party the farthest. It also gave them the possibility to see which coalition best matched their political preferences.

Other voting tools where the "Wie Kies Jij?" (the "Who do You Vote for") of the IPP which helped find the perfect candidate by his/her age, sex, dietary habits and political experience and the Stomwijzer (the "Stupid Pointer") which mocked VoteMatch, but still gave reasonable voting advice

=== De Stemming 2006 ===
Comedian Freek de Jonge performed an "election show" (verkiezingsconference) on public television on the night before the election. It was called "De Stemming 2006" (an ambiguous name which means both "The Vote 2006" and "The Mood 2006"). In his ironic comedy show, which was totally focused on the election, he ridiculed the candidates, making such a show a uniquely Dutch phenomenon. When asked whether this show would influence the upcoming election De Jonge stated he would make a fool out of everyone, not favouring a single person. This was the second time he did such a show. The first one was in 2003, when it was the thirty-third best watched TV programme in the Netherlands that year. This year, the show was watched by 2,016,000 viewers.

== Campaign ==
The main issue at stake during the election was the economic performance of the centre-right Second Balkenende cabinet, which consisted of the Christian democratic CDA, the conservative liberal VVD and the progressive liberal D66, as well as the composition of the new government and the future of the Dutch economy. Other issues were integration and the environment.

=== Power question ===
The most important question of the election was which party would become the largest, the governing Christian democratic CDA or the main opposition party, the social democratic PvdA. This was similar to the situation of the 2003 general election. The largest party would have the initiative in the cabinet formation talks. Furthermore, if it became part of the cabinet, the largest party would supply the prime minister. The media framed the election as a "clash of the titans" between prime minister Jan Peter Balkenende (CDA) and candidate-prime minister Wouter Bos (PvdA).

Both parties had consciously kept their options open and did not expressed a preference for the composition of a new cabinet. Other parties did express clear preferences: the VVD wanted to continue to govern with the CDA, while the Socialist Party and the GroenLinks (GL) favoured a leftist coalition, the so-called "Left-wing Spring". Broadly speaking, it appeared that there were three options: a continuation of the third Balkendende cabinet with CDA and VVD, a left-wing coalition of PvdA, SP and GL or a centre-left coalition of PvdA and CDA.

In 2004 and 2005, opinion polls indicated that the united left could gain a majority in the House of Representatives. The polls predicted two head-to-head races. One between the PvdA and ruling CDA and another between the left-wing bloc (PvdA, SP, GroenLinks) and the right-wing bloc (CDA, VVD) with neither gaining a majority. Early November polls however showed that the CDA was gaining support and surpassing the PvdA. Mid-November polls indicated that the PvdA was bleeding votes to the SP while the CDA remained more or less stable. The left- and right-wing blocs remained in an equilibrium with neither side gaining enough votes for an overall majority. Small centrist parties such as the Christian Union could play a decisive role.

=== Social-economic issues ===
The election debates were dominated by social-economic questions and especially the performance of the Balkenende cabinets.

In the last four years the three Balkenende cabinets had implemented an ambitious programme of socioeconomic reforms, including tax cuts, reforms to the social welfare system and investments in education. Their aim was to jump start the Dutch economy. Initially there was great public dissatisfaction with this policy, with large demonstrations in 2003, 2004 and 2005 organised by the main labour union FNV and the three main opposition parties. They criticised the government for taking these measures at the wrong point in time, during a recession, and they claimed that the government made the poor and socially weaker pay for the economic recovery. A major focus of this debate was that more than 10% of people were said to live in poverty, as exemplified by the rising number of food banks. As the economy began to perform better in 2006, public dissatisfaction decreased.

There were roughly three positions on the future of the Dutch economy. The CDA claimed that the reforms were finished and that the following cabinet would not have to take any serious measures. The VVD wanted to continue reforming to increase the performance of the Dutch economy. They wanted to continue to cut taxes and reduce bureaucracy. The opposition parties PvdA, SP and GL, joined by the Christian Union, wanted to revert some of the measures and pay more attention to the public sector, especially to the health care sector and the poor. The PvdA and the GroenLinks however also announced that they wanted to reform part of the economy and welfare system. For instance several months before the election, Wouter Bos, the leader of the PvdA, announced that he wanted to tax the elderly pension in such a way that rich elderly would pay more taxes on their pensions than poor elderly. The Dutch pension system consists of government supplied (AOW) and mandatory self-saved pensions. It is the latter portion Bos wanted to tax progressively. The proposal led to considerable controversy, both outside and within Bos' own party. Former minister and De Volkskrant columnist Marcel van Dam wrote a critical column on 22 June concerning Bos' proposal. The second man of the Christian Democratic Appeal Maxime Verhagen used soundbites from the proposal continually to emphasise that the PvdA was an unreliable partner for the elderly. Bos later moderated his plans: only new cases would pay taxes over their pension.

=== Immigration and integration ===
Immigration and integration, which had dominated the 2002 and 2003 elections, were clearly less important during this election.

The focus was on the policy of Rita Verdonk, minister of immigration and integration, who had reduced the influx of immigrants and implemented mandatory integration courses for migrants. Verdonk's attitudes toward immigrants were again in the spotlight after her treatment of the crisis around the naturalisation of Dutch MP Ayaan Hirsi Ali caused the cabinet to fall.

In the debates one issue was especially important: the treatment of 26,000 asylum seekers which had been in legal procedures for over five years. The left-wing opposition parties PvdA, SP, GL and CU, joined by former coalition partner D66 wanted a general pardon for this group, granting them all a residence permit. The CDA, VVD and the smaller right-wing parties of Geert Wilders and Marco Pastors opposed such a permit because it would attract illegal immigrants. Minister Verdonk claimed that she had actually already taken care of these 26,000 asylum seekers, sending many back to their own country and granting many a residence permit.

A minor issue was the ban on burqas and other face-covering clothing in public which minister Verdonk announced on 17 November 2006. The opposition Labour Party called the law an "election ploy", and a Muslim leader described it as "a big law for a small problem."

Several right-wing parties, such as One NL and the Party for Freedom, had campaigned extensively on the issue of immigration and integration. Wilders of the Party for Freedom wanted a halt of immigration from non-Western countries, abolish double citizenship, and stop the building of new mosques. Wilders said that the "Islamisation of the Netherlands" is a "tsunami" that needed to be stopped because it "threatens our culture."

=== The environment ===
The environment finally also became a secondary issue during the election.

The first attention to environmental issues was attracted by Greenpeace, which interfered in the CDA party congress on 30 September 2006. During a speech of parliamentary chairman Maxime Verhagen, Greenpeace activists rolled down a large sign saying "CDA chooses for 240,000 years of nuclear waste," referring to the news a day earlier that the CDA junior minister of the environment Pieter van Geel was open to new possibilities for nuclear energy in the Netherlands. Four activists were apprehended by the police afterwards.

Other important events increasing the attention on environmental issues were the Stern Review of the United Kingdom government and the visit of Al Gore to Amsterdam promoting his movie An Inconvenient Truth.

GroenLinks focused on this issue during its campaigns and sponsored ads which read: "Who votes strategically when the polar caps are melting?" The Party for the Animals had campaigned on one issue closely related to environmental problems: the position of animals in Dutch society and especially in agriculture.

== Voting issues ==
=== Voting machine controversy ===
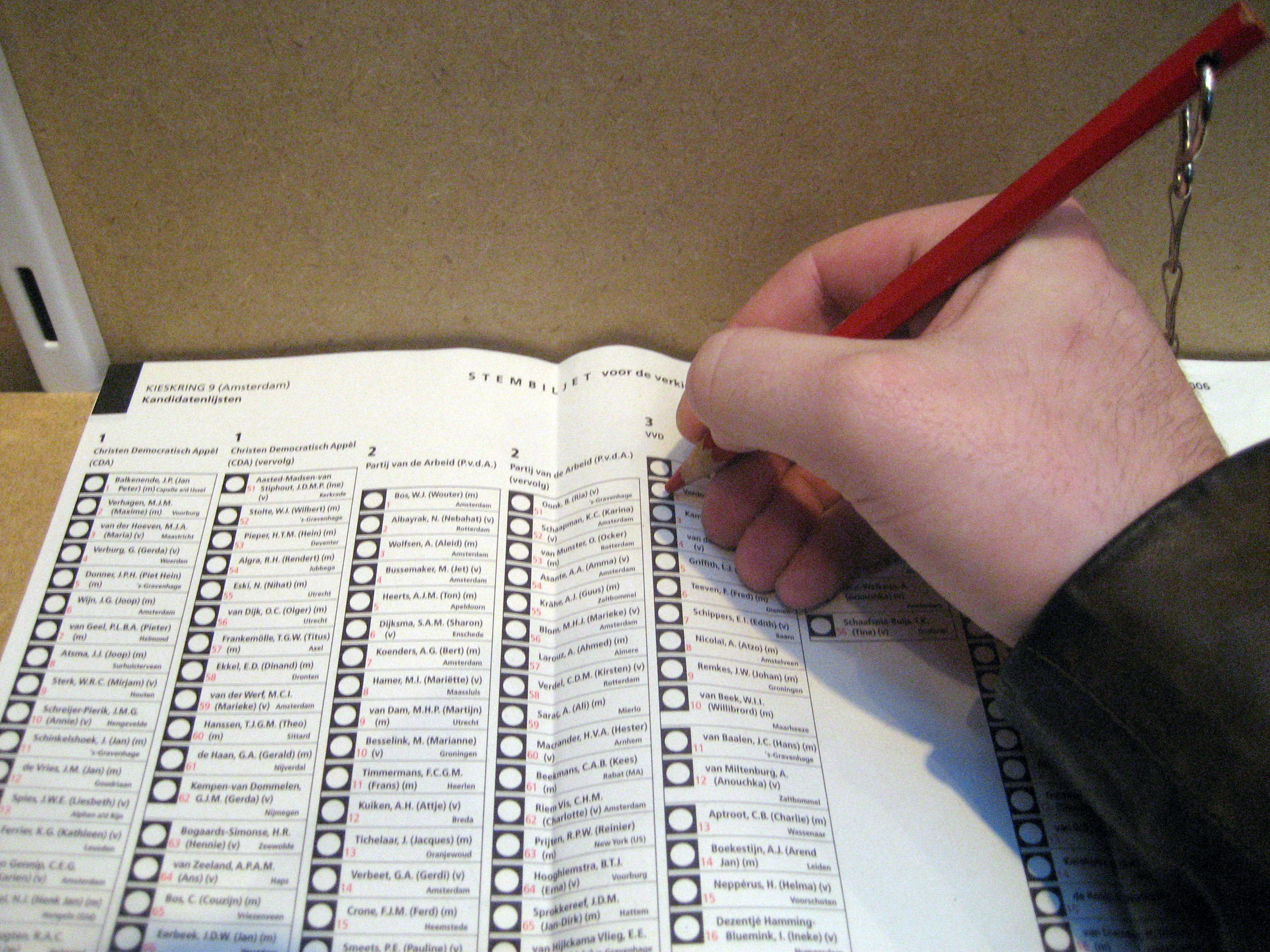
In some municipalities voting was conducted using the old red pencil and paper method.

A report by action group Wij vertrouwen stemcomputers niet (We don't trust voting computers) detailed serious security flaws in the Nedap voting machines used by 90% of the voters in the election. The report alleged it was easy to open the voting machine casing. The inner casing around the electronics was only protected by a very simple lock. Thus replacements of software and even hardware were relatively easily possible (by a simple memory chip swap, meaning that the memory that holds the voting data is not encrypted). Another machine is made by SDU and called "NewVote". It is based on a PC and uses a touchscreen instead of buttons. Only ten small districts still use paper and pencil.

Wij vertrouwen stemcomputers niet threatened to bring minister Atzo Nicolaï to court since they were not convinced by his assurances that there would be no fraud in the election. In response to the allegations, Nicolaï introduced new security measures for the voting machines. Currently Nedap is checking all its machines for tampering, is installing new chips and software that is less easily hacked, and seals the machines with a unique metal seal. Based on inspections, on 30 October the government decided that there was a problem with SDU voting machines because within a radius of 10 metres the machines could be wirelessly monitored, so that these machines could not guarantee anonymity of voting to a sufficient degree. These machines, which are in use in 35 municipalities, including Amsterdam, have to be improved or replaced with an alternative before the election. Many municipalities, including Amsterdam, decided to switch to the traditional paper and red pencil method of voting instead of the SDU machines. Machines made by Nedap are still in use.

=== Experiments ===
Two experiments were conducted during this election:

The first experiment was Stemmen in een Willekeurig Stemlokaal (SWS, "voting in a random polling-booth"). Because a lot of people could not vote because of problems caused by this experiment a group of citizens started procedures to nullify the results in all 311 area's where the experiment was conducted.

The other experiment was Kiezen Op Afstand (KOA, "remote voting"), also called the experiment with internetstemmen ("internet voting").

In an experiment in Breukelen, a voting machine was placed in a petrol station. However, non-Breukelen citizens had to convert their "voting pass" (stempas) to an "elector's pass" (kiezerspas).

== Public debates ==
More than during previous elections, there was a strong focus on party leaders, especially Bos of PvdA and Balkenende of CDA, regarding who of the two might become prime minister. This irritated not only other parties but also analysts who complained that election should be about issues and parties, not about who becomes prime minister.

=== Radio debate ===
The first public election debate between the leaders of the seven largest parties was held on 29 October 2006, on public radio. Mark Rutte, whose VVD was junior partner in the third Balkenende cabinet of CDA prime minister Jan Peter Balkenende, was worried that the CDA would choose a coalition with the PvdA after the election, as this, at the time of the debate, was the only possible two-party coalition with a majority according to polls. Balkenende, however, kept his options open, and did not rule out a coalition with the PvdA. The PvdA's Wouter Bos stated that he would not become a deputy prime minister in case Balkenende would lead a CDA-PvdA coalition. He would then remain as chairman of the parliamentary party.

=== RTL 4 debate ===
This debate took place on 3 November 2006 and was televised by RTL 4. Participants were Jan Peter Balkenende and Wouter Bos. Balkenende focused on his achievements from the preceding four years, stating "We are much better off than four years ago. We were behind in Europe and now we're ahead but our work is not yet done." Bos felt that under Balkenende the gap between rich and poor had grown, stating "What have you asked of the wealthiest? Everybody has been asked to dig into their pockets to contribute to the economy." In an opinion poll conducted by TNS-Nipo following the televised debate, 50 percent of respondents thought Wouter Bos had won the debate, against 46 percent for Jan Peter Balkenende.

=== NOS Jeugdjournaal debate ===
This debate was broadcast on 11 November 2006 and was televised by the Jeugdjournaal (YouthNews) of the NOS. The debate was aimed at children from 8 to 14 years of age. Participants were the lead candidates from the four parties leading the polls: Jan Peter Balkenende (CDA), Wouter Bos (PvdA), Mark Rutte (VVD) and Jan Marijnissen (SP). A poll among the young watchers after the debate showed that the Dutch children preferred Wouter Bos as the next prime minister (46%), before Marijnissen (26%), Balkenende (22%) and Mark Rutte (6%).

=== EenVandaag debate ===
This debate took place on 15 November 2006 and was organised by EenVandaag. Participants were Jan-Peter Balkenende, Wouter Bos, Mark Rutte, Jan Marijnissen, Femke Halsema and André Rouvoet. According to an opinion poll following the debate, Jan Marijnissen had won the debate.

=== NOS debates ===
- 21 November (NOS): two consecutive debates; the first between the leaders of the smaller parties in the polls, the second between leaders of the projected six largests parties:
  - Alexander Pechtold (D66), Bas van der Vlies (SGP), Olaf Stuger (Pim Fortuyn List), Marco Pastors (One NL), Geert Wilders (PVV) and Marianne Thieme (PvdD), at 19:05
  - Jan Peter Balkenende (CDA), Wouter Bos (PvdA), Mark Rutte (VVD), Jan Marijnissen (SP), Femke Halsema (GroenLinks) and André Rouvoet (Christian Union) at 20:30.

==== Summary ====
2006 Dutch general election debates
Date	Organisers	P Present NI Non-invitee A Absent invitee												Note
Date	Organisers	Marijnissen	Thieme	Halsema	Bos	Pechtold	Rutte	Rouvoet	Balkenende	Vlies	Pastors	Wilders	Stuger	Note
28 October	Radio 1	P	NI	P	P	P	P	NI	P	NI	NI	P	NI	
3 November	RTL 4	NI	NI	NI	P	NI	NI	NI	P	NI	NI	NI	NI	
11 November	Jeugdjournaal	P	NI	NI	P	NI	P	NI	P	NI	NI	NI	NI	
15 November	EenVandaag	P	NI	P	P	NI	P	P	P	NI	NI	NI	NI	
21 November	NOS	NI	P	NI	NI	P	NI	NI	NI	P	P	P	P	
21 November	NOS	P	NI	P	P	NI	P	P	P	NI	NI	NI	NI	

== Opinion polls ==
In the Netherlands there are three agencies that conduct frequent polls throughout the year (usually weekly). There is usually a small difference which may be due to different sampling and surveying methods applied. From 1 November the 'Politieke Barometer' started with two polls each week, and from 13 November they increased the frequency to daily polls.

The last polls prior to the election of the Politieke Barometer, the poll by NOVA and Interview-NSS, the TNS-NIPO polls by RTL4, and the poll by Maurice de Honds' peil.nl yield the following results:

The day before the election, about one third of voters had not yet made up their minds, resulting in polls giving strongly varying results. For this reason campaigning continued on election day itself. An aspect of this was tactical voting, with SP telling PvdA voters that a strong SP would force PvdA to form a left-wing coalition, VVD saying something similar to CDA voters concerning a right-wing coalition, PvdA and CDA saying they need to be strong to prevent the other party from forming or dominating a coalition and Christian Union saying it had the best cards to participate in any coalition. Shortly before the election, PvdA leader Bos showed himself more interested in the much talked about left-wing coalition of PvdA, SP and GroenLinks (possibly with ChristenUnie), which he had refused to talk about for months. Many suspected he changed his mind to stop the exodus of PvdA voters to SP. During the municipal elections earlier that year, the PvdA grew strong and after that they even grew to 60 seats in the polls, but after March a gradual decline had set in, almost halving the size of the PvdA in the polls.

Polling firm	Date	CDA	PvdA	VVD	SP	Fortuyn	GL	D66	CU	SGP	PVV	PvdD	EénNL	Lead	Ref
Politieke Barometer	21 Nov 2006	41	37	23	23	1	7	3	6	2	4	2	1	4	
Peil.nl	21 Nov 2006	42	38	22	23	0	8	2	6	2	5	1	1	4	
TNS-NIPO	20 Nov 2006	41	31	22	32	0	6	1	8	2	6	2	0	9	
2003 election	22 January 2003	44	42	28	9	8	8	6	3	2	-	-	-	2	
^{a} Fortuyn is here compared with its immediate predecessor LPF^{b} PVV is here presented as a new party, as it did not participate in the 2003 election. It is however a continuation of Groep Wilders, an independent MP during part of the last term, after he split off from VVD

== Results ==
In order to increase their changes of obtaining the remainder seats, two combined lists were formed: one by the Socialist Party and GroenLinks (which gained one remainder seat) and one by the Christian Union and the SGP. Other remainder seats were allocated to the CDA (2), the PvdA (2), D66 (1) and the PVV (1).

The number two candidate on the VVD list, Immigration Minister Rita Verdonk received more preference votes (620,555) than list leader Mark Rutte (553,200). This was attributed to her greater national profile. The number six candidate on the D66 list, Fatma Koşer Kaya received the second highest number preferences (34,564), second only to lead candidate Alexander Pechtold (95,937). This was a result of the CDA and PvdA removing candidates of Turkish origin from their lists because of their position on the Armenian genocide, which led to the Turks Forum advising voters of Turkish origin to vote for Koşer Kaya, who is of Turkish origin, although her position on the genocide was ambiguous. Any individual candidate reaching the quota (16,397 votes in this election) is elected, resulting in Koşer Kaya being elected and taking one of the three seats won by D66.

Party	Votes	%	Seats	+/–
Christian Democratic Appeal	2,608,573	26.51	41	−3
Labour Party	2,085,077	21.19	33	−9
Socialist Party	1,630,803	16.58	25	+16
People's Party for Freedom and Democracy	1,443,312	14.67	22	–6
Party for Freedom	579,490	5.89	9	New
GroenLinks	453,054	4.60	7	−1
Christian Union	390,969	3.97	6	+3
Democrats 66	193,232	1.96	3	−3
Party for the Animals	179,988	1.83	2	+2
Reformed Political Party	153,266	1.56	2	0
One NL	62,829	0.64	0	New
List 5 Fortuyn	20,956	0.21	0	–8
United Seniors Party	12,522	0.13	0	New
Ad Bos Collective	5,149	0.05	0	New
Party for the Netherlands	5,010	0.05	0	New
Islam Democrats	4,339	0.04	0	New
Netherlands Transparent	2,318	0.02	0	New
Green Free! Internet Party	2,297	0.02	0	New
Liberal Democratic Party	2,276	0.02	0	New
Poortman List	2,181	0.02	0	New
Continuous Direct Democracy Party	559	0.01	0	New
LRVP - hetZeteltje	185	0.00	0	New
Solid Multicultural Party	184	0.00	0	New
Tamara's Open Party	114	0.00	0	New
Total	9,838,683	100.00	150	0
Valid votes	9,838,683	99.83		
Invalid/blank votes	16,315	0.17		
Total votes	9,854,998	100.00		
Registered voters/turnout	12,264,503	80.35		
Source: Kiesraad

=== By province ===
Results by province
Province	CDA	PvdA	SP	VVD	PVV	GL	CU	D66	PvdD	SGP	Others
Drenthe	22.5	30.7	15.9	14.3	4.0	3.8	5.1	1.3	1.4	0.3	0.7
Flevoland	23.8	20.8	15.1	16.8	6.8	3.7	5.9	1.6	2.1	2.1	1.3
Friesland	28.1	27.5	17.1	10.6	3.3	3.8	6.1	1.1	1.3	0.4	0.7
Gelderland	29.3	20.3	16.1	13.5	4.4	4.4	4.8	1.8	1.6	3.0	0.8
Groningen	18.3	31.0	19.2	10.9	3.2	5.9	7.0	1.9	1.6	0.3	0.7
Limburg	28.6	20.3	20.6	10.8	11.5	3.4	1.2	1.1	1.5	0.1	0.9
North Brabant	31.8	17.8	20.4	14.5	6.2	3.4	1.5	1.6	1.4	0.4	1.0
North Holland	21.0	22.2	16.8	18.2	5.5	7.0	2.3	2.7	2.7	0.2	1.4
Overijssel	33.0	21.1	14.8	11.1	4.0	3.4	6.9	1.6	1.1	2.2	0.8
South Holland	24.1	20.5	14.3	16.1	7.2	4.3	4.4	2.3	2.1	2.5	2.2
Utrecht	26.8	18.7	13.2	16.7	5.1	6.5	5.5	2.7	1.9	2.0	0.9
Zeeland	28.0	18.2	15.5	12.9	5.6	2.9	5.1	1.1	2.0	7.8	0.9

=== Maps ===
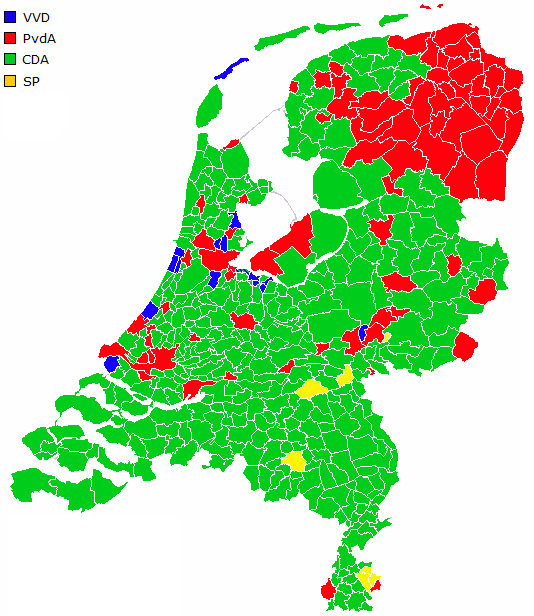
Largest party per municipality:. In the Dutch system this is of limited importance as it operates a proportional system.

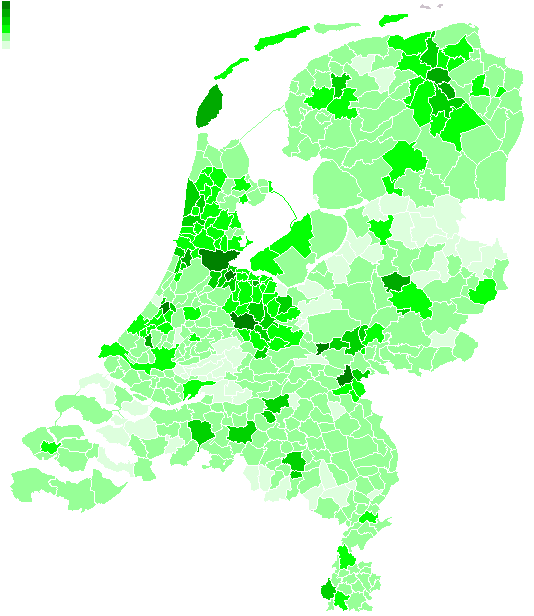
Results by municipality, shaded according to percentage of the vote for GroenLinks.

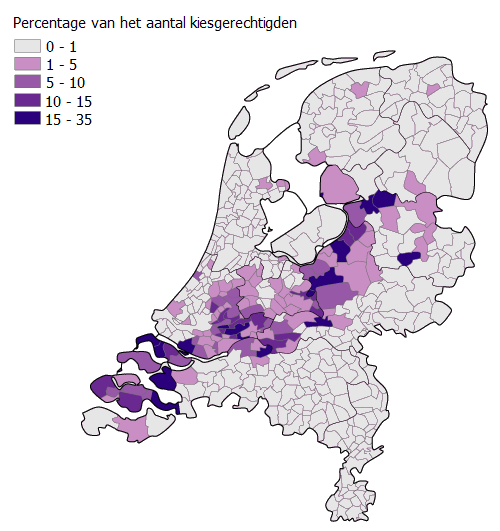
Results by municipality, shaded according to percentage of the vote for the Reformed Political Party

Results by vote share in each province. Darker shades denote a higher vote share for the winning party.

== Reactions ==
In the final debate between the leaders of the major parties (CDA, PvdA, SP, VVD, PVV, GL and CU) it was pointed out that the seated government lost 9 seats and the left wing parties (PvdA, SP, GL, PvdD) won 8 seats, which was interpreted as a signal from the voters that government policy should be more social. On the right, the PVV gained 9 seats, but other parties are silent about a possible coalition with the PVV. In the debate between party leaders – after the election was over – the question was raised if any of the leaders would want a coalition with the PVV. All kept quiet. When Wilders called this a "cordon sanitaire," VVD leader Rutte responded fiercely, saying that "there is no cordon sanitaire." Rutte believes the PVV is a "one-issue party," but also pointed out that he did not exclude the PVV as coalition partner.

When asked about the possibility of a CDA-PvdA-CU coalition, PvdA leader Bos responded that during the campaign the differences between CDA and PvdA have turned out to be rather big and that the big winner SP also deserves a place at the negotiating table. SP leader Marijnissen responded to this that the SP had never excluded CDA as a coalition partner, but that the CDA of the previous cabinet is not one with which the SP can enter a coalition. That, combined with the program of the CDA and the list of CDA MPs would constitute many 'road bumps' and 'bears on the road', and said he did not really want to start a coalition with this CDA program and this CDA MP list. Prime minister Balkenende responded that the CDA he wanted does not exist and that he has to enter talks with the CDA as it is now.

== Aftermath ==
Since no party held an absolute majority in the House of Representatives, the formation of a coalition government, consisting of parties who together have enough seats to propose laws that can count on a majority in the House of Representatives was necessary. This is most commonly achieved by building a coalition that has a majority; although a minority cabinet that arranges ad hoc majorities for its proposals is possible. With the 2006 results a majority coalition required at least three parties.

Initially, negotiations for a cabinet of CDA, PvdA and SP were started, but the parties seemed unwilling to form this cabinet. Later on, negotiations for a CDA-PvdA-ChristenUnie cabinet were started. This resulted in the formation of the Fourth cabinet Balkenende. It was installed by Queen Beatrix on 22 February 2007. In the meantime the Balkenende III cabinet continued as a caretaker cabinet, which is not supposed to make new policy.

== See also ==
- List of candidates in the 2006 Dutch general election
- List of members of the House of Representatives of the Netherlands, 2006–2010
