= Gerlof Jukema =

Dutch politician

Member of the House of Representatives
- In office 2002–2003

Personal details
- Born: 19 November 1958 (age 67) Nijverdal
- Party: Pim Fortuyn List, One NL
- Occupation: Doctor, politician

Gerlof Johannes Jukema (born 1958) is a Dutch doctor and former politician for the Pim Fortuyn List (LPF).

Jukema was born in Nijverdal in 1958. He studied medicine at Leiden University before working at a hospital in Purmerend. Jukema became a member of the LPF at the behest of its leader Pim Fortuyn and was elected to the House of Representatives for the party in 2002. Following Fortuyn's assassination, Jukema caused mild controversy when (along with fellow LPF parliamentarian Milos Zvonar) he stated he would help to force-feed Fortuyn's killer Volkert van der Graaf after der Graaf went on hunger strike in prison. For the 2006 parliamentary elections, Jukema stood for the One NL party which was founded by fellow LPF politician Joost Eerdmans but was not elected.
