= Daniël van den Berg =

Dutch politician (born 1991)

Member of the House of Representatives
- Incumbent
- Assumed office 12 November 2025

Member of the Provincial Council of North Holland
- In office 20 March 2019 – 8 December 2025

Personal details
- Born: Daniël Juriën van den Berg; 17 October 1991 (age 34) Amsterdam, Netherlands
- Party: JA21 (since 2020)
- Other political affiliations: FvD (2019–2020)
- Children: 3
- Education: Royal Marechaussee Training, Education and Knowledge Center, Apeldoorn

Daniël Juriën van den Berg (born 17 October 1991) is a Dutch politician for the JA21 party and former officer of the Royal Marechaussee. In the 2025 Dutch general election, he was 7th on the candidate list for the Dutch House of Representatives elections. He was the JA21 faction leader in the Provincial Council of North Holland.

== Biography ==
=== Early life and career ===
Van den Berg was born in Amsterdam and grew up in Gooi. After school he trained as an officer in the Royal Marechaussee where he worked in border control. Afterwards, he worked in the technical and logistical sector where he held various management positions.

=== Politics ===
Van den Berg has described the ideas of assassinated Dutch politician Pim Fortuyn and his experiences working in border security and seeing issues around human trafficking and terrorism as motivating his political career. He was elected to the Provincial Council of North Holland during the 2019 Dutch provincial elections on behalf of Forum for Democracy (FvD). After multiple controversies in the FvD including statements made by leader Thierry Baudet and leaked social media conversations within the party's youth-wing which contained extremist content, Van den Berg resigned from the FvD in 2020 along with several other members of the Provincial Council and joined the newly founded breakaway party JA21 of Joost Eerdmans and Annabel Nanninga.

During the 2023 Dutch provincial elections he was re-elected to the Provincial Council of North Holland and became the faction leader for JA21.

For the 2023 Dutch general election, van den Berg stood as a candidate for JA21 but was not elected. He stood again during the 2025 Dutch general election for JA21's list and was subsequently elected.

=== Personal ===
Van den Berg describes himself as a Christian and currently lives in Huizen with his wife and three daughters.

== See also ==
- List of members of the House of Representatives of the Netherlands, 2025–present
