= Livable South Holland =

Dutch provincial-level political party

Livable South Holland (Leefbaar Zuid-Holland) was a Dutch provincial-level political party, whose aim was to represent the many local-level parties in provincial-level politics in the province of South Holland. The party's only representative was Lenneke van der Meer from the 2003 elections until 2007. She was the party's fractievoorzitter. From 2007 to 2011, Ronald Sørensen was the party leader and represented the party in provincial politics.

Livable South Holland dissolved in 2010.

== See also ==
Similarly named parties:

- Provincial level:
  - Livable Brabant/BOF
- Local level:
  - Livable Almelo
  - Livable Almere
  - Livable Amsterdam
  - Livable Den Haag
  - Livable Eindhoven
  - Livable Hilversum
  - Livable Rotterdam
  - Livable Tynaarlo
  - Livable Utrecht
- (Supra)national level:
  - Livable Europa
  - Livable Nederland
