= Margot Kraneveldt =

Dutch politician

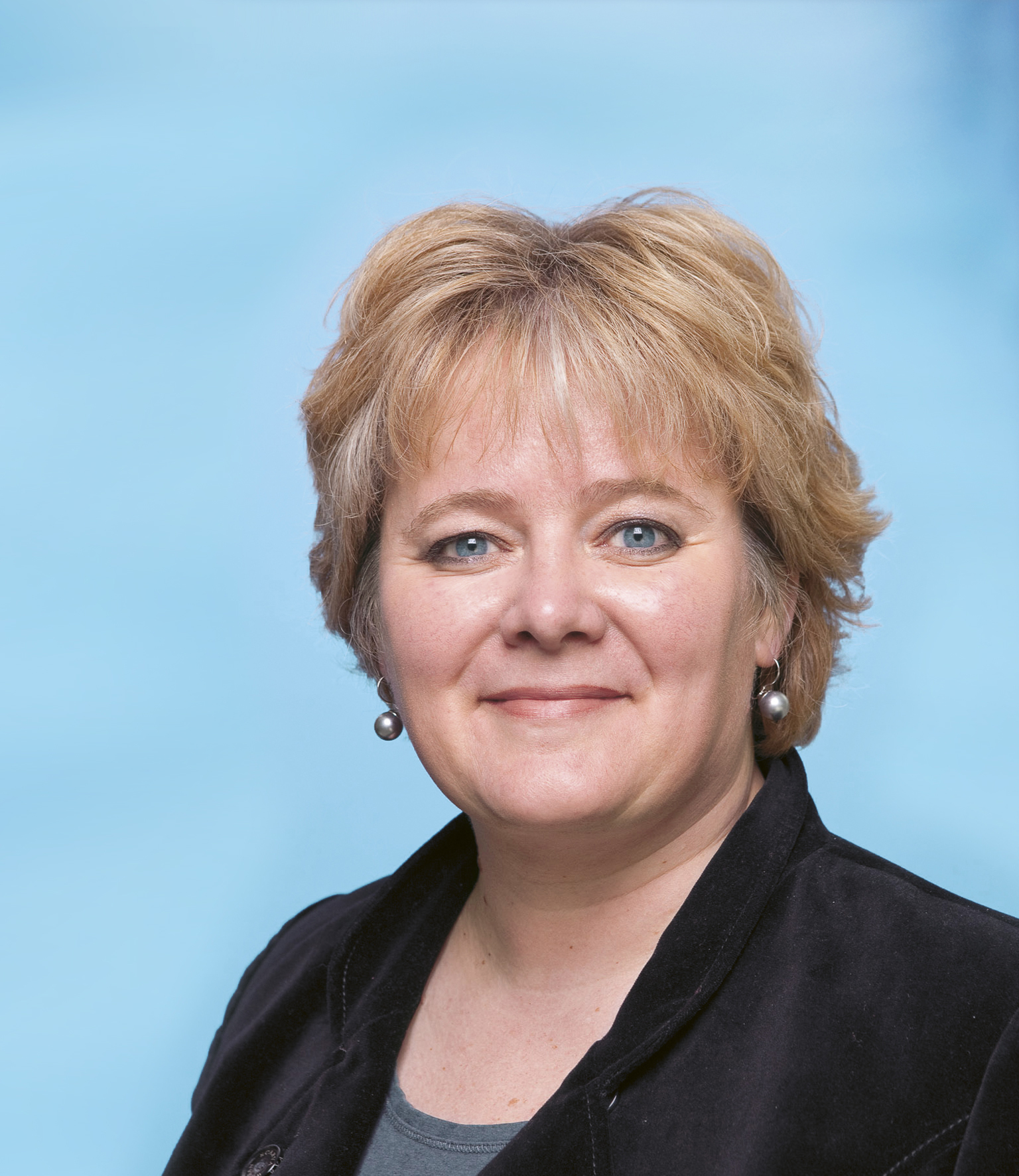

Member of the House of Representatives
- In office 2003–2006

Personal details
- Born: 26 May 1967 (age 59) Hilversum, Netherlands
- Party: Pim Fortuyn List (LPF) (2002–2006)
- Other political affiliations: PvdA
- Education: Free University of Amsterdam

Margot Kraneveldt (born 26 May 1967) is a Dutch politician who has served as an MP in the Dutch House of Representatives.

== Biography ==
Kraneveldt studied languages at the Free University of Amsterdam. She worked as a high school German teacher and later for a publishing company. In 2002, she became a policy officer and assistant for Pim Fortuyn List MP Vic Bonke. In 2003, she entered the House of Representatives as an MP on behalf of the LPF. Kraneveldt was involved in the policy areas of education, culture, media, childcare, emancipation and family affairs, and technology and science policy. In 2004, she submitted a motion to instill more integration policies in high schools for students born outside the Netherlands. The motion was approved by the PvdA and VVD and was passed. In 2006, she resigned from the LPF due to the deteriorating conditions in the party and disagreements with its course, in particular due to its continuing support for the third Balkenende cabinet minority government which she disapproved of. Her seat in parliament was turned over to Gonny van Oudenallen. Kraneveldt then joined the Labour Party.

In the 2006 House of Representatives elections, she was 36th on the Labour Party's candidate list. Kraneveldt still returned to parliament on 1 March 2007. In 2008, she became secretary of the parliamentary group of the PvdA. She also served as the eighth vice president of the House of Representatives.

For the 2010 House of Representatives elections, she was 34th on the PvdA list, not enough to continue her work in the House. On 10 April 2012 she succeeded John Leerdam as a temporary replacement for Sharon Dijksma, who was on maternity leave at the time and returned on 8 May.

In the 2014 Dutch municipal elections, Kraneveldt was elected to the Zoetermeer municipal council on 27 March. She became chairman of the PvdA faction there and subsequently list leader in upcoming elections.
