= Simon Ceulemans =

Dutch politician (born 1989)

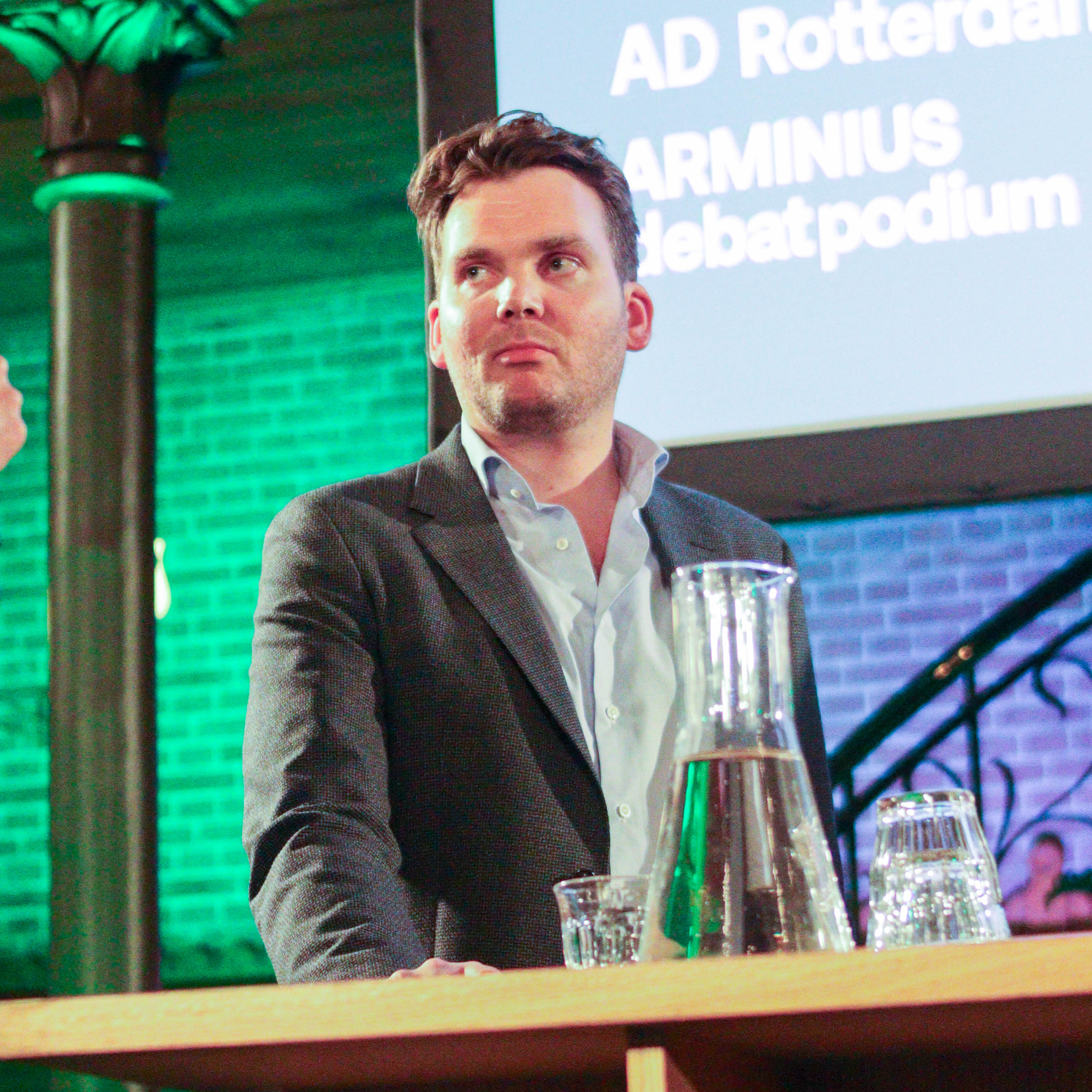
- Ceulemans in 2023

Leader of the Livable Rotterdam
- Incumbent
- Assumed office 1 July 2024
- Preceded by: Ingrid Coenradie

Member of the House of Representatives
- Incumbent
- Assumed office 12 November 2025

Member of the Rotterdam Municipal Council
- Incumbent
- Assumed office 30 March 2022

Personal details
- Born: 21 May 1989 (age 36) De Bilt, Netherlands
- Party: Livable Rotterdam (since 2014); JA21 (since 2021)

Simon Ceulemans (born 21 May 1989) is a Dutch politician from Rotterdam who was elected to the House of Representatives for JA21 in 2025 and serves as a municipal councillor for Livable Rotterdam. Since 24 June 2024 he has also been the group chair of Livable Rotterdam in the Rotterdam municipal council.

== Early life and education ==
Ceulemans developed an interest in politics at a young age, citing the rise of Pim Fortuyn as his earliest political memory. He studied political science and later joined the parliamentary office of Livable Rotterdam as staff.

== Political career ==
From 2014 onward, Ceulemans worked at the parliamentary office of Livable Rotterdam. In 2022, he was elected as a councillor for Livable Rotterdam in the Rotterdam municipal council. His portfolio includes public order and safety, integration & social cohesion, and the national programme for Rotterdam-South.

On 24 June 2024, Ceulemans was chosen by his party's council group as group chair of Livable Rotterdam, succeeding Ingrid Coenradie.

Nationally, Ceulemans is affiliated with JA21 since 2021. He won a seat in the House of Representatives for that party.
