= Fortuynism =

Political ideology of Pim Fortuyn

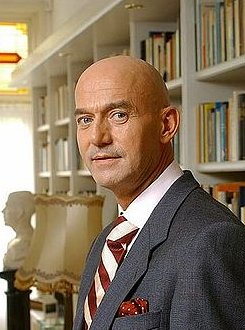
Pim Fortuyn, after whom Fortuynism is named

Fortuynism (Dutch: Fortuynisme) is the political ideology of Dutch politician Pim Fortuyn. Observers variously saw him as a political protest targeting the alleged elitism and bureaucratic style of the Dutch purple coalitions, whereas he was offering "openness, directness and clearness", populism simply as charisma. Another school holds Fortuynism as a distinct ideology, with an alternative vision of society. Some argue that Fortuynism is not just one ideology, but that it contained liberalism, populism and nationalism.

Fortuyn was highly critical of Islam and Muslim immigration to the Netherlands and was opposed to multicultural policies of the Dutch government at the time. However, some political commentators noted that ethnic nationalism and racist sentiments did not play a part of Fortuyn's ideology and in comparison to other European national-populist politicians of the era, he held socially liberal stances on matters such as LGBT rights. Following his assassination in the run up to the 2002 Dutch general election, his party, the Pim Fortuyn List formed the second largest party in parliament and government after the election. Although the party would fade from relevance and eventually dissolve in 2008, Fortuyn is noted for influencing anti-immigrant parties and politicians in the Netherlands and elsewhere in Europe.

== History ==
Fortuyn was assassinated in the run-up to the 2002 Dutch general election after which the Pim Fortuyn List saw a sudden rise in support before going into decline and disbanding itself in 2008. However, the ideology of Fortuynism has continued to have an impact upon Dutch politics. Following Fortuyn's death, conservative and right-wing politicians such as VVD Minister for Integration Rita Verdonk gained influence and tightened some of the Netherlands' immigration policies. There were also attempts to create new Fortuynist parties ahead of the 2006 general election, which included One NL founded by Marco Pastors and Party for the Netherlands formed by former LPF politician and minister Hilbrand Nawijn. These parties did not meet any success. However, other politicians such as Geert Wilders and his Party for Freedom gained traction and inherited many of Fortuyn's former supporters by focusing on some of the issues Fortuyn championed, such as stricter stances on integration and immigration. Newer political parties described as inheriting Fortuyn's influence have included Thierry Baudet's Forum for Democracy and JA21 founded by former LPF representative Joost Eerdmans.

Outside of the Netherlands, Fortuyn also had an influence on Belgian politicians such as lawyer and Open VLD member Hugo Coveliers who incorporated Fortuynism into his VLOTT party and Jean-Marie Dedecker who founded Libertair, Direct, Democratisch.

== Ideology ==
Fortuynism has generally been characterized as based on "populism" by political commentators. Dutch political author Cas Mudde defined Fortuynism as containing elements of liberalism, populism and nationalism. Others have defined it as opposition and a reaction to the perceived bureaucratic and elitist governing style of the purple coalitions, particularly under Dutch Labour Party Prime Minister Wim Kok. Gerrit Boerman, the head of the Document Center for Dutch Political Parties at the University of Groningen described Fortuyn's ideology as a "cocktail of elements stemming from different directions" which included conservative and communitarian values to restore "norms and values" from the 1950s, less government interference in the economy, while also holding a liberal and libertarian attitude on sexual freedom and soft drugs and a nationalistic stance towards immigration and protecting core Dutch principles against multiculturalism.

Fortuyn had been a Marxist during his studies and early academic career before joining the Labour Party in the 1970s. However, his views shifted to the right in response to what he saw as failed policies on crime, immigration and integration. In his 1995 book De verweesde samenleving ("The orphaned society"), Fortuyn claimed that the progressive movement of the 1960s had eroded traditional norms and values. He wrote the roles of the "symbolic father" and the "caring mother" had been lost, leaving an orphaned population without guidance, to live out a meaningless decadent existence.

Fortuyn also documented much of his own beliefs and proposals in his book De puinhopen van acht jaar Paars which criticized many of the policies of the purple coalitions and instead argued for a reduction in state bureaucracy, improvements to the health system, restrictions on immigration and stricter law and order policies. Fortuyn also favoured greater direct democracy, including elected mayors, police chiefs and an elected head of state. In foreign policy, Fortuyn and his party supported Dutch participation in NATO and were not opposed to the principle of European integration in theory, but opposed what they saw as the excessive bureaucracy and threat to national sovereignty posed by the European Union. Fortuyn also proposed ending Dutch participation in the Eurozone and the Schengen Agreement.

Other commentators have noted opposition to Islam, multiculturalism and immigration as forming a significant part of Fortuynism. In August 2001, Fortuyn was quoted in the Rotterdams Dagblad newspaper saying, "I am also in favour of a Cold War with Islam. I see Islam as an extraordinary threat, as a hostile religion." He also argued that if legally possible, he would not allow any more Muslim immigrants into the Netherlands. However, Fortuyn also maintained that he did not oppose immigrants on the basis of their ethnic background and supported a pluralistic society in theory, but opposed what he saw as an unwillingness to integrate and a rejection of Dutch secular liberal values within existing Muslim communities. Jens Rydgren noted that while Fortuyn used anti-immigration rhetoric, he did not position himself as a far-right nationalist or a supporter of racial ethno-nationalism, and as such Fortuyn differed from other European national-populist leaders at the time. Instead, Fortuyn sought to defend Dutch values such as tolerating gay rights (Fortuyn was openly homosexual and an outspoken supporter of gay rights himself) which he saw as threatened by immigration. Fortuyn's ideas also differed from the more socially conservative and traditional values stances espoused by other nationalist politicians through holding liberal opinions regarding same-sex marriage, abortion and euthanasia. Fortuyn's party also won support from some ethnic minority voters and included candidates from immigrant backgrounds on its list for the 2002 election.

Political scientist Rudy Andeweg noted that Fortuynism can also be defined by the following positions:

- Civil liberties
- Classical liberalism
- Criticism of Islam
- Deregulation
- Direct democracy
- Euroscepticism
- Freedom of speech
- Laissez-faire
- LGBT rights
- Republicanism
- Secularism
- Separation of church and state
- Small government
- Women's rights

== Reception ==
Prior to Fortuyn's assassination, other Dutch politicians and journalists, particularly on the left, criticized Fortuyn and his ideas as extremist or racist, with some comparing Fortuyn's stances to that of European far-right politicians such as Jörg Haider and Jean-Marie Le Pen. An explicit comparison with Le Pen was made by Ad Melkert, the former leader of the Labour Party who stated 2002: "If you flirt with Fortuyn, then in the Netherlands the same thing will happen as happened in France. There they woke up with Le Pen, soon we will wake up with Fortuyn." GroenLinks leader Paul Rosenmöller claimed Fortuyn's policies were "not just right but extreme right". Some commentators such as columnist Jan Blokker attempted to draw parallels between Fortuyn and Dutch hard-right politicians such as Hans Janmaat. Following Fortuyn's death, some opponents of Fortuyn including Rosenmöller, Thom de Graaf, and Melkert have objected to what they think is a harsher political and social climate, especially towards immigrants and Muslims, as a result of Fortuyn's legacy.

Fortuyn himself strongly disputed comparisons drawn between him and Dutch or foreign far-right leaders, contending that he was mislabeled and accused the Dutch political establishment of endangering his life by demonizing him and his beliefs. Following Fortuyn's death, Dutch political leaders such as former Prime Minister Jan Peter Balkenende retrospectively expressed agreement with some of Fortuyn's criticisms of the purple coalitions and multiculturalism. Other commentators, such as former Muslim feminist author Ayaan Hirsi Ali and journalist Douglas Murray have defended some of Fortuyn's beliefs.

Fortuyn's book Puinhopen also inspired Flemish politician Geert Bourgeois to write De puinhoop van paars-groen (The wreckage of purple-green) in 2002 which featured similar critiques of Belgian politics, particularly accusations of misgovernment against the Verhofstadt I Government.
