= Ingrid Coenradie =

Dutch politician (born 1987)

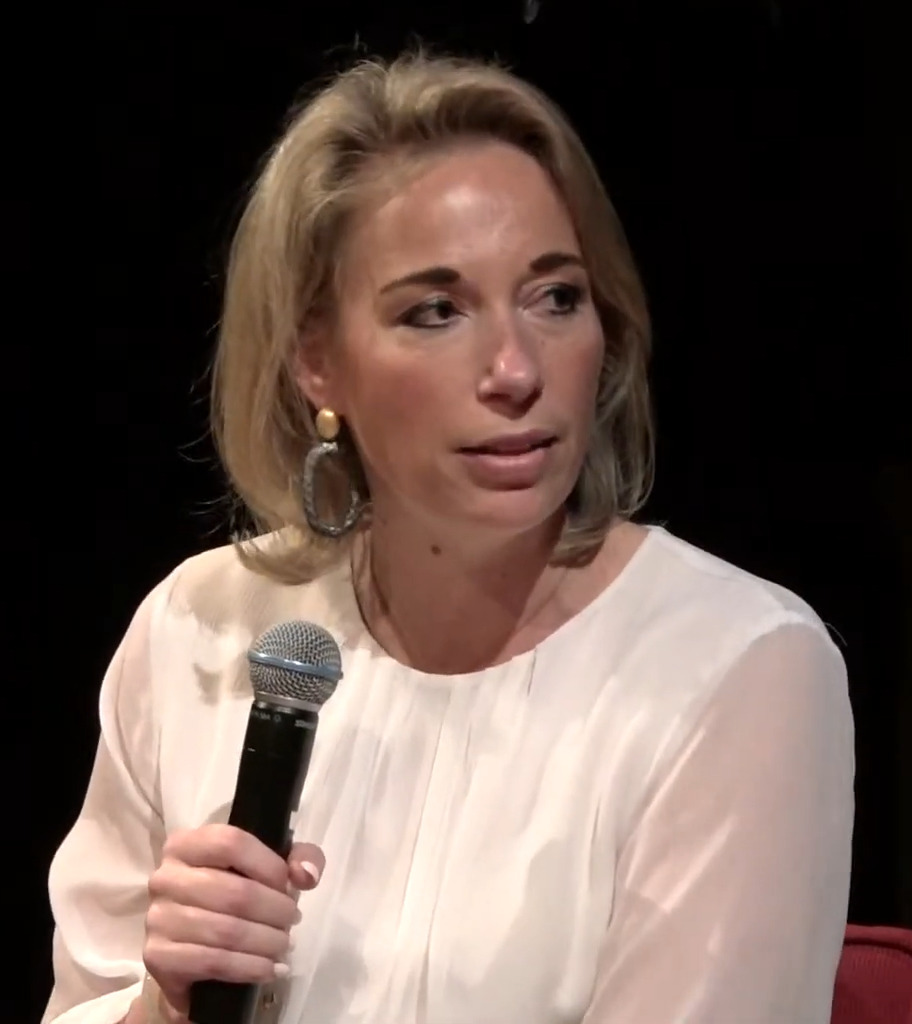
- Coenradie in 2025

Member of the House of Representatives
- Incumbent
- Assumed office 12 November 2025

State Secretary for Justice and Security
- In office 2 July 2024 – 3 June 2025 Serving with Teun Struycken
- Prime Minister: Dick Schoof
- Minister: David van Weel

Leader of the Livable Rotterdam
- In office 14 July 2023 – 14 June 2024
- Preceded by: Bart van Drunen
- Succeeded by: Simon Ceulemans

Member of the Rotterdam Municipal Council
- In office 30 March 2022 – 2 July 2024

Personal details
- Born: 21 December 1987 (age 38) Rotterdam, Netherlands
- Party: Livable Rotterdam; JA21 (2025–present)
- Other political affiliations: VVD (2009–2011); PVV (2024–2025)
- Children: 1
- Education: HU University of Applied Sciences Utrecht
- Occupation: Entrepreneur; politician

Ingrid Coenradie (Dutch: [ˈɪŋɡrɪt kunˈraːdi]; born 21 December 1987) is a Dutch politician. On behalf of the Party for Freedom (PVV), she served as State Secretary for Justice and Security in the Schoof cabinet until June 2025.

== Early life and career ==
Coenradie was born in Rotterdam, and she grew up in its southern district. Her father worked as a music teacher, but he suddenly became deaf when Coenradie was twelve. Her mother suffered a severe cerebral infarction the same year. Coenradie has openly discussed two sexual assaults in her teenage years. She has told that she was assaulted at the age of 13 by her boss at a sandwich shop and at the age of 18 by two men. Her criminal complaint following the latter did not lead to a conviction.

Coenradie was working as sales manager for an occupational health and safety service in 2022. She was also a piano teacher, while on the municipal council.

== Politics ==
Coenradie joined the conservative-liberal People's Party for Freedom and Democracy (VVD) in her teens. She left the party after Mark Rutte was chosen over Rita Verdonk to lead the party in 2006, believing the VVD had moved too far to the political left. She later became a member of Livable Rotterdam, and she started serving on the Rotterdam Municipal Council in 2022, with a focus on safety. She stressed the importance of the police, citing her two sexual assaults, and she was in favor of permitting preventive frisking at night in response to a series of incidents involving explosives. Coenradie became her party's parliamentary leader in July 2023. She proposed to offer courses to young street criminals and to help them start businesses, in order to give them a second chance. She explained that her break with the party's usual tough-on-crime stances was due to her strong belief in prevention.

After the PVV, VVD, NSC, and BBB formed the Schoof cabinet, Coenradie was sworn in as State Secretary for Justice and Security on 2 July 2024. She was nominated by the PVV. Her portfolio includes civic integration, prisons, probation service, fire brigade, regional disaster relief and crisis management, sexual offenses, and reforms of emergency powers legislation. In response to a personnel shortage in prisons, Coenradie examined the possibility of re-opening a closed prison in Almere and incarcerating convicts in Estonian prisons, despite significant opposition to the latter in parliament. She also shortened sentences for most detainees by three days. When she was considering lengthening this period to two weeks, PVV party leader Geert Wilders flatly rejected the suggestion.

On 20 June 2025, Coenradie announced she was leaving PVV to become a member of JA21, partially in response to her public clashes with Wilders.

== Personal life ==
Coenradie battled and survived cervical cancer twice.

Political offices
| Preceded by Eric van der Burg | State Secretary for Justice and Security; 2024–present | Incumbent |
