= Livable Rotterdam =

Livable Rotterdam Leefbaar Rotterdam
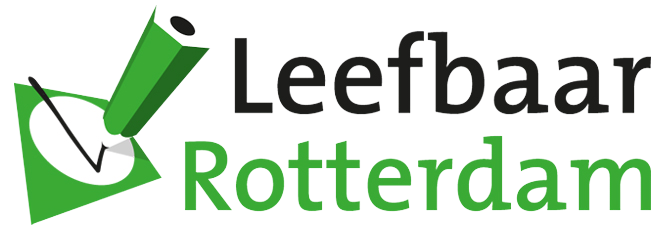
- Leader: Ronald Buijt
- Chairman: Pieter van Hoof
- Founder: Ronald Sørensen
- Founded: December 2001
- Headquarters: Rotterdam
- Ideology: Conservative liberalism Localism; Fortuynism
- Political position: Right-wing
- National affiliation: Livable Netherlands (2001–2002); Pim Fortuyn List (2002); Forum for Democracy (2018–2020); JA21 (2021–present)
- Colours: Green & Black
- Municipal council of Rotterdam: 11 / 45

Website
- www.leefbaarrotterdam.nl

Livable Rotterdam (Dutch: Leefbaar Rotterdam) is a conservative liberal and localist political party in the municipality of Rotterdam in the Netherlands, which was founded by Ronald Sørensen in 2001. The party was founded at the same time as a number of other Leefbaar ("Livable") parties which contested municipal and local elections as alternatives to the main Dutch parties.

== History ==
Livable Rotterdam was founded by teacher, union spokesman and former Labour Party member Ronald Sørensen and his wife. Sørensen said that his main reason for forming the party was that he did not agree with the way things were going in national politics. After registering the party, he contacted Pim Fortuyn, who at the time was in the public spotlight, and asked him to front the party's campaign for the 2002 local election in Rotterdam. Fortuyn had been selected as leader of the national Livable Netherlands (LN) party and Livable Rotterdam was initially considered the local counterpart to the LN. However, Fortuyn was later sacked as leader of the LN due to controversial comments he made in an interview and founded his own party, the Pim Fortuyn List (LPF). Livable Rotterdam chose to retain Fortuyn as its lead candidate and affiliated itself to the LPF. Livable Rotterdam won the council elections of March 2002 due to the charismatic leadership of Fortuyn and saw him elected along with 17 councilors which included Sørensen and Marco Pastors. This made it the city's largest political party, a position which for the previous thirty years had been held by the Labour Party.

The party consists of numerous members that are new to politics and were attracted to Fortuyn's dreams of political change. The party attracts attention and criticism for the upfront behavior of its members and its unconventional, if sometimes right-leaning vision, especially on issues of immigration, crime and inter-culture tolerance.

In the municipal elections of 7 March 2006, Livable Rotterdam lost 5%, dropping to 29.7% of their votes and PvdA gained 15%, making the latter the biggest party again, with 37.4% of the votes. Before the elections, Livable Rotterdam declared it would not enter in a coalition with PvdA and several members even declared that, irrespective of the coalition, they would leave the council if PvdA would become the biggest party (which has happened).

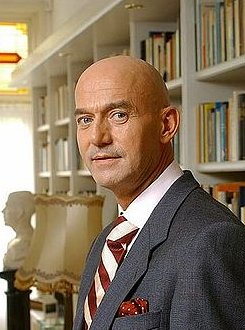
Pim Fortuyn

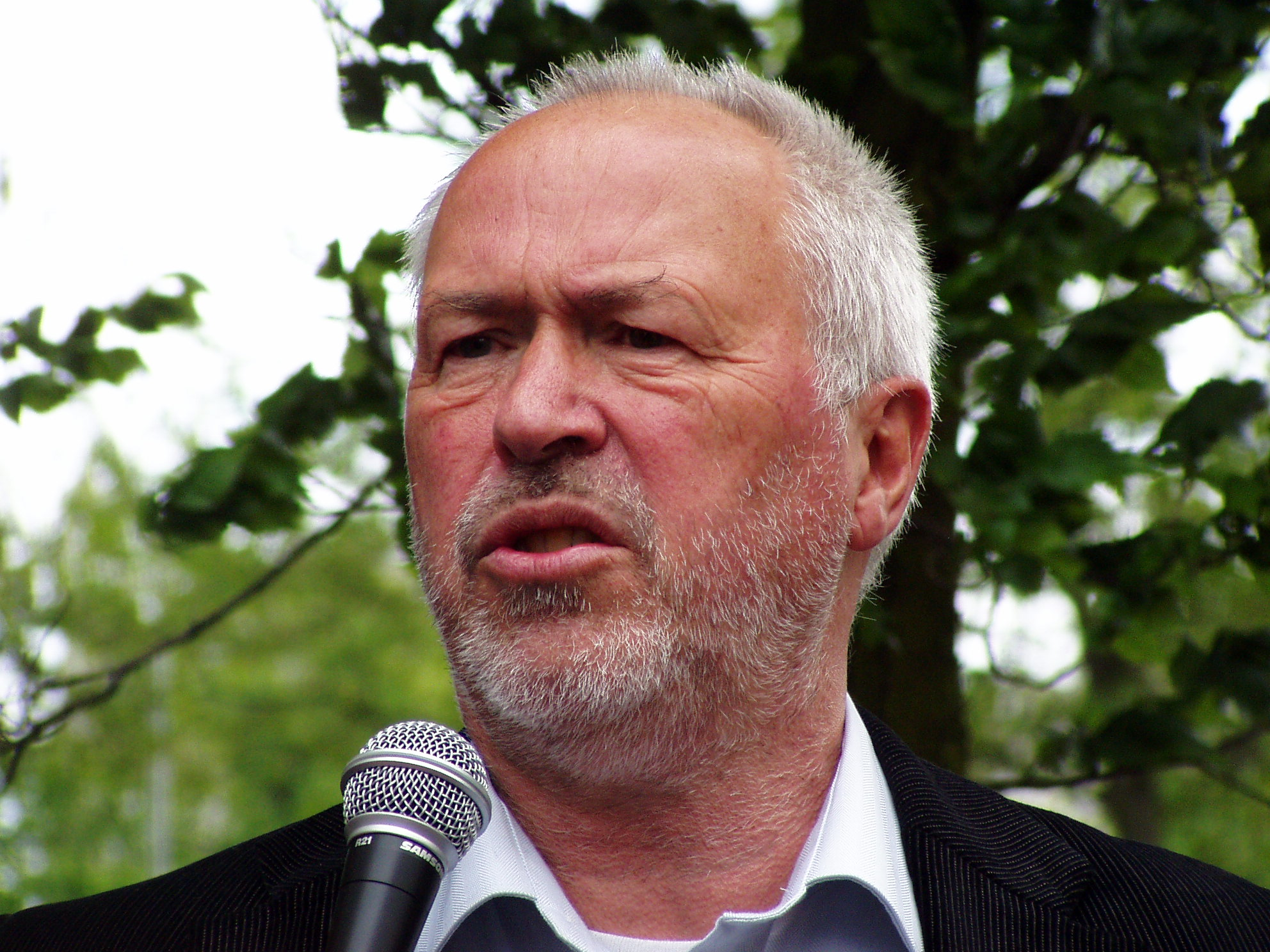
Ronald Sørensen

After the municipal elections of 3 March 2010 the Public Prosecutor in Rotterdam launched an investigation into how proxy votes were solicited by the party, after an e-mail emerged in which one of the party’s councillors gives tips on how to accumulate these. Ronald Buijt wrote that he had 50 reliable citizens of the city who could take the proxy votes to the polling stations. The electoral council said this went against the spirit of proxy voting, which should only be used at the initiative of the voter. This irregularity was added to a litany of complaints against the poll in Rotterdam in these elections (many of which were caused by the PvdA), which resulted in a recount of all the votes cast. Back then the PvdA only beat Livable Rotterdam by a mere 650 votes, yet both parties had 14 seats in the city council.

Joost Eerdmans was elected lijsttrekker of Livable Rotterdam on 6 October 2013. Under his leadership, the party won the 2014 municipal election, retaining its fourteen seats. Since 8 May 2014, Livable Rotterdam leads a coalition with CDA and D66.

As of 2022, the party leads a new coalition with VVD, D66 and Denk

== Beliefs ==
As a municipal party, Livable Rotterdam focuses on matters related to Rotterdam municipality although some of its ideas are comparable to national parties such as the Pim Fortuyn List, Party for Freedom and JA21 with themes related to integration, security and crime: the party calls for tougher policies against organized and violent criminal activity, more police funding, and expanding local democracy and referendums. In 2014, Livable Rotterdam campaigned for a tax relief for Rotterdam residents, stricter crackdowns on youth crime and providing more security for elderly people.

== National affiliations ==
Livable Rotterdam was started as a spin-off of the national party Livable Netherlands but is commonly seen as the local party of the Pim Fortuyn List (LPF), the national party founded by Pim Fortuyn after he was fired as lead candidate of the Livable Netherlands party in spring 2002. Livable Rotterdam and the LPF are considered to have similar policy ideas. After the LPF was dissolved in 2008, Livable Rotterdam was allied with the Forum for Democracy (FvD) party for a brief period in 2018 before distancing itself from the FvD. Today, Livable Rotterdam has connections with the JA21 party founded by Livable Rotterdam member Joost Eerdmans other JA21 members are Ingrid Coenradie and Simon Ceulemans. Although not an officially associated party, some elected representatives of Livable Rotterdam such as Barry Madlener, Ingrid Coenradie (who later joined JA21) and Ehsan Jami are affiliated with Geert Wilders' Party for Freedom (PVV), which campaigns on similar issues at a national level. Sørensen previously served as a Senator for the PVV.

== Electoral results ==
Election	Leader	Votes		Seats		Position	Coalition
Election	Leader	#	%	#	±	Position	Coalition
2002	Pim Fortuyn	93,852	37.8	17 / 45	▲17	▲1st	Coalition with CDA and VVD
2006	Marco Pastors	77,284	29.7	14 / 45	▼3	▼2nd	Opposition
2010	Marco Pastors	63,647	28.6	14 / 45	0	2nd	Opposition
2014	Joost Eerdmans	59,505	27.5	14 / 45	0	▲1st	Coalition with D66 and CDA
2018	Joost Eerdmans	47,312	20.5	11 / 45	▼3	1st	Opposition
2022	Robert Simons	39.972	20.01	10 / 45	▼1	1st	Coalition with VVD, D66 and DENK
2026	Ronald Buijt	43,248	20.49	11 / 45	▲1	▼2nd	Opposition
