= Christelijk College Nassau-Veluwe =

Coordinates: 52°20′22″N 5°37′17″E

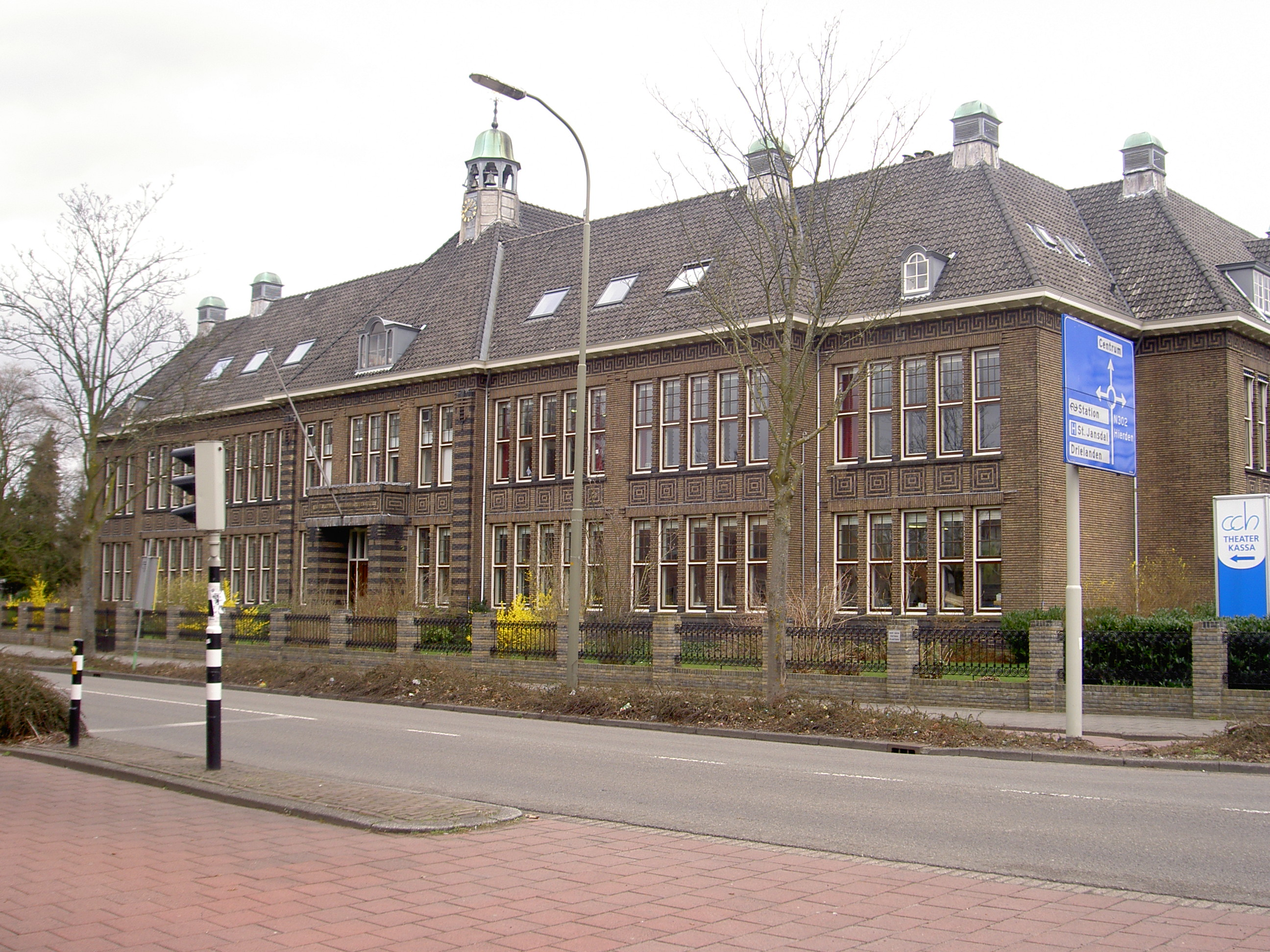
Christelijk College Nassau-Veluwe

The Christelijk College Nassau-Veluwe (CCNV) is a school in Harderwijk, Netherlands. It was founded in 1922 as a Christelijk Lyceum. The school houses just under 1500 pupils and 150 members of staff. Its rector is Elly Bakker.

== History ==
The school was founded in 1918, but did not open its doors until a year later. During the Second World War, multiple people who were connected to the school were killed. The names of these people are now represented on a plaque in the main stairwell.

== Notable alumni ==
- Tim Visser. International rugby player, currently playing wing for Harlequin F.C.
- Theo Bos. Dutch cyclist
- Joost Eerdmans. Dutch politician
