= One NL =

One NL Eén NL
- Leader: Marco Pastors
- Founded: August 23, 2006
- Headquarters: Rotterdam
- Ideology: Fortuynism
- Colours: Red, White and Blue

Website
- www.eennl.nl

Eén NL (One NL) is a Dutch political party founded in September 2006. It took part in the 2006 Dutch election under the leadership of Marco Pastors and Joost Eerdmans, but a dismal election result leaves the political future of the party quite uncertain. The party is seen as one of the political heirs of the late Pim Fortuyn.

The Eén in the name Eén NL, meaning 'one', emphasizes national unity where NL is the standard abbreviation of the Netherlands.

The party broadly stands for opposition to mass immigration to the Netherlands, tax cutting and shrinking government, zero tolerance on crime, constitutional reform (particularly more direct democracy and the direct election of the prime minister and members of parliament), restoring the "human dimension" in large public sectors such as education and health care, and a skeptical attitude to European integration.

Although the party is critical of the "islamization" of the Netherlands, in favor of the assimilation of minorities and opposed to further immigration, it is perceived as taking a less hard line on this issue than other right-wing parties such as Geert Wilders' Party for Freedom or Hilbrand Nawijn's Party for the Netherlands. Several moderate Muslims support the party.

On September 20, 2006, Anton van Schijndel, formerly of the VVD, joined the party and on September 24 he and Eerdmans formed a new parliamentary group with the provisional name Groep Eerdmans-Van Schijndel. The definitive list of candidates was presented on September 30, 2006. Among the new additions to the list were Hans Smolders, Pim Fortuyn's former chauffeur (the man who chased Fortuyn's assassin and was responsible for his apprehension), Fortuyn's young brother Simon Fortuijn and Jan Dirk Blaauw, a former member of the VVD parliamentary party.

The party program was presented on October 9, 2006, and in November 2006 Marco Pastors published a political pamphlet as well.

On November 15, the party released a radio advert, in which party leader Marco Pastors likened the apathy of "the establishment" towards the "Islamization of the Netherlands" to the laxism of Dutch politics towards the Nazi threat from Germany in the 1930s. In a talkshow Pastors said that the Dutch government must act at once, because "Hirsi Ali has already had to leave the country, Theo van Gogh has been murdered, and honour killing is becoming more widespread." Pastors pointed out that even those immigrants that are integrated say that things cannot go on like this.

A lawsuit filed against Pastors by the political opponent Moslim Democratische Partij was not honored, the judge argued that although the remark was sensitive it was not outside the bounds of law as it remarked not on Islam itself but on islamization as a civic phenomenon.

== Elections ==
Eén NL took part in the 2006 Dutch general election, but did not get enough votes for a seat in the House of Representatives. Their candidates for the election were:

1. Marco Pastors, councillor in Rotterdam for Leefbaar Rotterdam.
2. Joost Eerdmans, member of the House of Representatives.
3. Hikmat Mahawat Khan, business consultant and co-founder of the Contact Groep Islam.
4. Ronald Sorensen, councillor in Rotterdam for Leefbaar Rotterdam.
5. Secil Arda, business consultant.
6. Sander Simons, PR adviser / former broadcast journalist.
7. Anton van Schijndel, member of the House of Representatives.
8. Gerlof Jukema, doctor and member of the member of the House of Representatives.

=== Party Program ===
The party published its party program on October 9, 2006. However, media reports already provided some details in the week before. The party calls for a 4% income tax reduction across the board, will abolish almost all Dutch foreign development aid, and will return to the taxpayers the "Kok Quarter," a sales tax increase on gasoline introduced by Labour Party minister Wim Kok in 1991.

The key issues are:

- Democratic reform:
  - elected prime minister and mayors, although the party is not in favor of a republic
  - abolition of the Senate and reducing the size of the House of Representatives
- Government:
  - reduction of number of ministries to 6 (security, environment, general affairs, finance, foreign affairs, social affairs)
  - 30% reduction in civil servants in next 4 years, transparency in the appointment of government officials
- Taxation
  - reduction of general income taxes by 1% per year
  - abolition of gasoline tax introduced by the Dutch Labour Party Minister Wim Kok in 1991
  - keeping the tax exemption on housing loans
- Security:
  - introduction of minimum sentencing, lay judges
  - more effective police force by cutting bureaucracy, legalization on the production of soft drugs
- Immigration
  - deportation of illegal residents, greencard system
- Integration
  - strict separation of church and state, no government subsidies for religious and ethnic organizations
  - ban on burkas, new immigrants to be required to speak Dutch, official publications to be in Dutch only
- Education
  - downsizing schools, cutting management, emphasis on teaching practical skills
- Europe:
  - Access for new East European workers to Dutch job market only when existing unemployment is resolved.
