= Gonny van Oudenallen =

Dutch politician

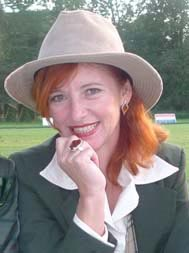

Parliamentary leader - Groep van Oudenallen House of Representatives of the Netherlands
- In office 7 July 2006 – 30 November 2006

Member of the House of Representatives

Personal details
- Born: Hillegonda Francisca Maria Koster; 31 January 1957 (age 69) Amsterdam, Netherlands
- Party: Groep van Oudenallen (2006) Chairwoman
- Other political affiliations: Mokum Mobiel (1998–2006) Chairwoman
- Education: University of Amsterdam
- Occupation: Creative Director, former politician, and author
- Website: (in English) Studio Dreams Come True

Hillegonda Francisca Maria "Gonny" van Oudenallen, born Hillegonda Francisca Maria "Gonny" Koster, (born Amsterdam, 31 January 1957) is Creative Director of Studio Dreams Come True, she has been in this role since 1987. She was formerly a Dutch politician, from April 1998 until March 2006 she was Councillor of the city of Amsterdam for the Amsterdam Mobiel party. She was a member of the House of Representatives from 7 July 2006 to 30 November 2006 as an independent MP.

== Career ==
=== Working life ===
Van Oudenallen started her career as a stewardess for KLM and Martinair. In 1987 she founded her own public relations & design agency in Amsterdam, "Studio Dreams Come True". Subsequently, she started the “Poetscompanie” an all girl theatrical shoe-shine business. She has written small theatre pieces, that were composed for advertising business clients. Until present she has worked in public relations and interior design. Since December 2008 she is director of the Vijzelstraat Museum in Amsterdam. In 2010 she started law studies at the University of Amsterdam.

=== Political life ===
In 1998 she became a councillor for Amsterdam, for the Mokum Mobiel party Mokum Mobiel (Mobile Mokum), which she founded. Mokum Mobiel Party was mainly involved with traffic and parking problems of Amsterdam. A number of the Mokum Mobiel motions were passed by City Hall. During this period Gonny van Oudenallen fulfilled several positions within the City of Amsterdam: Vice President, Account Committee City of Amsterdam, Chairman, Ports and Finance Commission, a member of every City Council Committees, appointed by the Mayor to the inquiry procurement committee of the new metro line. In 2006 she became an MP until the parliamentary elections of November 2006, when Van Oudenallen stood down. That same year she became a member of the CDA Party.

With permission of her local party, Van Oudenallen was a candidate for the Pim Fortuyn List (LPF) in the 2003 Dutch elections, but failed to obtain a seat (Hilbrand Nawijn obtained more preferential votes). In June 2006, a seat in parliament became vacant, because Margot Kraneveldt retired. The LPF did not want Ms. van Oudenallen in their parliamentary party, therefore she sat as a one-person party, Groep van Oudenallen.

==== Minister Hoogervorst incident ====
On 24 October 2006 van Oudenallen made headlines, because she failed to recognize health minister Hans Hoogervorst during the weekly question period in the House. Hoogervorst responded to her questions and even a notification from the President of the House, Frans Weisglas, did not suffice to help her recognize the minister.

== Bibliography ==
=== Publications ===
Gonny van Oudenallen is co-writer and producer of The life and work of Enrico di Tommaso.
