= JA21 =

Dutch political party

- Leader: Joost Eerdmans
- Chairperson: Adrien de Boer
- Leader in the House of Representatives: Joost Eerdmans
- Leader in the Senate: Karin van Bijsterveld
- Founders: Joost Eerdmans; Annabel Nanninga
- Founded: 18 December 2020
- Split from: Forum for Democracy
- Headquarters: Anna van Buerenplein 41; 2595 DA The Hague
- Membership (2026): ▲4,860
- Ideology: Right-wing populism; Conservative liberalism; Fortuynism
- Political position: Right-wing to far-right
- European affiliation: European Conservatives and Reformists Party (until 2023)
- Colours: Navy; Crimson
- Senate: 2 / 75
- House of Representatives: 9 / 150
- European Parliament: 0 / 31
- Provincial councils: 22 / 572
- Municipal councils: 17 / 8,522

Website
- ja21.nl

JA21 (Dutch: [ˌjaːʔeːnənˈtʋɪntəx]), (Note: lit. 'Yes21'; backronym for Juiste Antwoord 2021, 'Right Answer 2021'.) statutorily known as the Conservative Liberals (Dutch: Conservatieve Liberalen), is a political party in the Netherlands. The party has been categorised as conservative liberal and right-wing populist in its platform by political commentators. JA21 was founded on 18 December 2020 by Joost Eerdmans and Annabel Nanninga following their departure from Forum for Democracy (FvD) on 26 November 2020 after disagreeing with the state of affairs in FvD. The party first participated in elections in the 2021 general election.

== History ==
=== Background ===
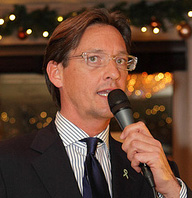
Joost Eerdmans, co-founder and leader of the party

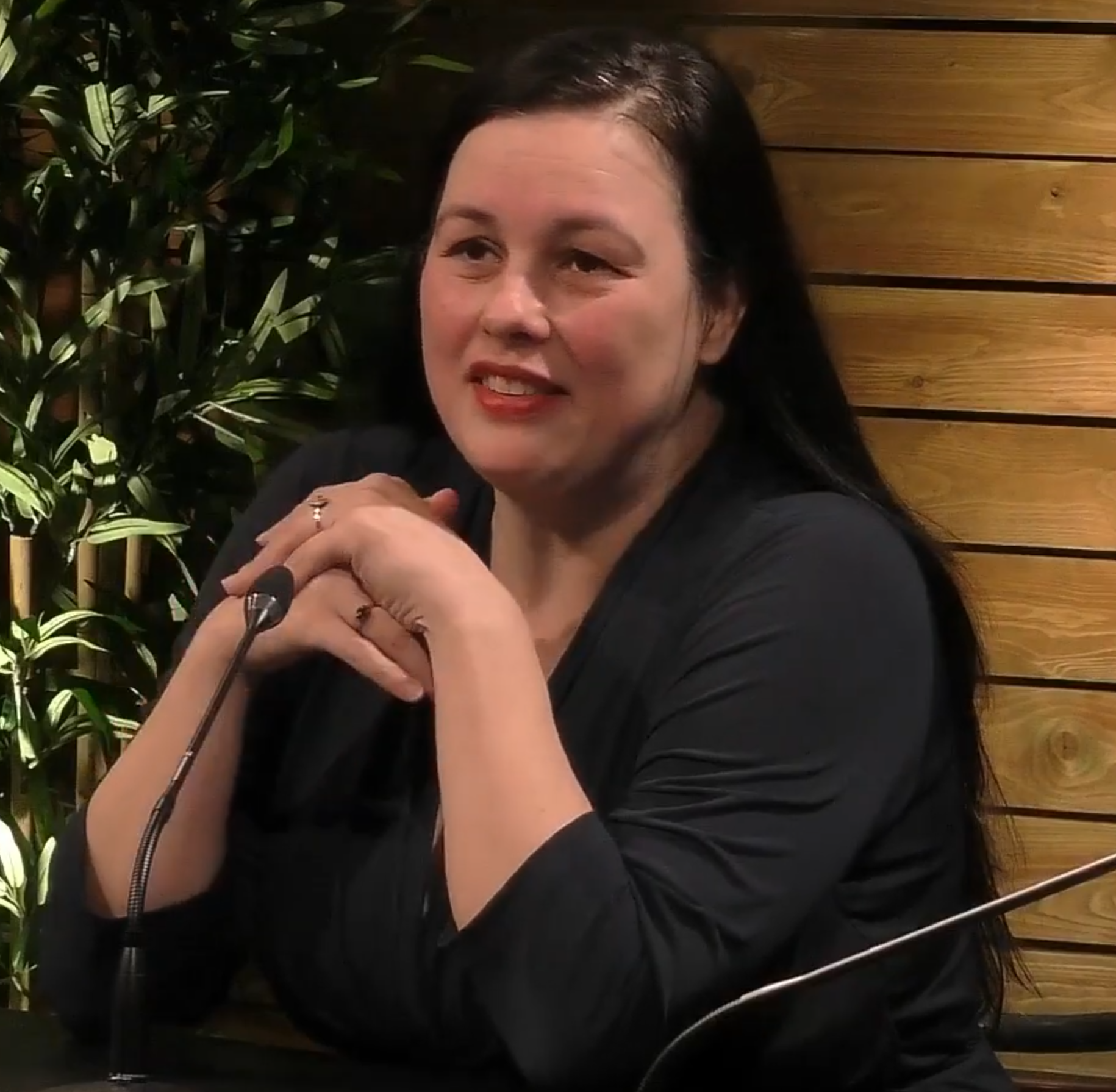
Annabel Nanninga, co-founder and leader in the Senate

In November 2020, there was a series of disputes within the Forum for Democracy (FvD) party following allegations of racism, antisemitism and homophobia against its youth wing the Jongerenorganisatie Forum voor Democratie (including glorification of Anders Breivik and Brenton Tarrant by members of the youth wing), as well as controversial statements made by party leader Thierry Baudet. These followed earlier controversies surrounding the youth-wing which had happened in April that year. The incidents prompted several candidates and members of the FvD to criticise what they saw as the party's slow and unwilling attitude to address the problem. The conflict escalated and a number of prominent spokespeople of the FvD such as Joost Eerdmans, Annabel Nanninga, Nicki Pouw-Verweij and Eva Vlaardingerbroek resigned from the party in protest, with Pouw-Verweij arguing in an interview with De Telegraaf that Baudet and the FvD had become radicalized and more focused on conspiracy theories.

=== Establishment ===
After resigning from the FvD, Eerdmans and Nanninga announced they would start afresh with a new party to contest the 2021 Dutch general election. JA21 was officially founded on 18 December 2020 by Eerdmans and Nanninga who also recruited several former FvD members, staffers and representatives with Eerdmans serving as party leader. Eerdmans had prior political experience having previously been a member of parliament for the Pim Fortuyn List and served as deputy mayor of Rotterdam. At its launch, JA21 described itself as a "proper" right-wing party aiming to fill the gap between the centre-right People's Party for Freedom and Democracy (VVD) and the more radical-right Party for Freedom (PVV). In 2021, Eerdmans declared JA21 to be a "right-wing, no-nonsense party" of "common sense" that would appeal to those "for whom the VVD is too left-wing, the PVV too right-wing and the FvD too idiotic by now" and that JA21 would stick to the "original points" of the FvD. Eerdmans furthermore stated that he wanted JA21 to inspire a return of Fortuynism to Dutch politics, which he defined as a decisive, no-nonsense and straightforward approach to decision making.

According to Eerdmans, the name JA21 would not only refer to the first names of himself and Nanninga; it also stands for the 'Right Answer/Correct Answer' (het 'Juiste Antwoord') and 'Your Alternative' ('Jouw Alternatief').

=== Rise of the party ===
On 20 December 2020, ex-Forum for Democracy MEPs Derk Jan Eppink, Rob Roos and Rob Rooken announced that they had become members of JA21. Two days later, the independent Senate group Fractie-Van Pareren – consisting of seven ex-Forum for Democracy senators – joined JA21, making it the fourth largest party in the Senate.

On 16 January 2021, the provincial group of Forum for Democracy in North Brabant split, with three members leaving Forum for Democracy to form the JA21 parliamentary group in the Provincial Council of North Brabant. As Forum for Democracy was part of the province's coalition government at the time of the split, the new JA21 parliamentary group immediately entered the coalition after talks with the other coalition members. This marked the first time that JA21 entered a coalition with other parties.

During the 2021 Dutch general election in March, JA21 received 246,620 votes and elected three MPs to the House of Representatives. In the 2023 Dutch provincial elections, the party won 22 provincial seats enabling it to qualify for representation in the Senate. In parliament, the party adopted as motion with the BBB on nitrogen and called for the relocation of asylum reception to partner countries outside the EU, following the Danish model.

=== Splits and resurgence ===
In 2023, there was some unrest within the party from members who complained of lack of internal democracy with some members complaining about Nanninga's position on the candidate list for the 2023 general election. As a result, the party lost two of its three MEPs and two of its three members of the House of Representatives who joined the Farmer–Citizen Movement. During the 2023 Dutch general election, JA21 retained one seat in parliament, leaving Eerdmans as its only representative.

In the 2024 European Parliament election, JA21 received 40,570 votes or 0.65% of the total vote, failing to get any seats.

Ahead of the 2025 Dutch general election, Eerdmans was once again nominated as lead candidate by the party board with Nanninga in second place. In August 2025, JA21 presented its candidate list for the election and revealed it would include former PVV State Secretary Ingrid Coenradie, New Social Contract MP Diederik Boomsma, Member of the European Parliament Michiel Hoogeveen, former Livable Rotterdam leader Marco Pastors, and Simon Fortuyn, brother of assassinated Dutch politician Pim Fortuyn. The party saw an increase in support and strongest result in a general election with nine MPs elected.

== Ideology and policies ==
In its platform, JA21 describes itself as both liberal and conservative with an emphasis on personal freedom, political transparency, and reliable government. Initially, JA21 sought to emulate the original political platform of the Forum for Democracy party from which it split. Both political observers and the party's leadership have also referred to JA21 as being influenced by Fortuynism, the ideology espoused by assassinated Dutch politician Pim Fortuyn and his Pim Fortuyn List (LPF) party. Party leader Joost Eerdmans, himself a former LPF member of parliament, has claimed that he wants JA21 to help "Fortuyn's ideas return to the House of Representatives."

In its founding manifesto, JA21 states that it stands for "less regulatory burden, tax relief, a strict immigration policy and support for the entrepreneurs who make our country great". JA21 is strongly opposed to further integration within the European Union and the EU becoming a Federal Superstate. It wants to strengthen the Netherlands' autonomy by ending influence of the EU on domestic affairs by putting "Dutch interests first" and supporting the right to national self-determination. It also supports a referendum on Dutch membership of the Eurozone, a revision of Dutch membership of EU treaties and the Schengen Agreement, and for the Netherlands to renegotiate its membership of the EU. JA21 is also opposed to the potential accession of Turkey to the European Union. The party also wants to opt out of the EU asylum pact, regain full control over Dutch borders and expel illegal immigrants. JA21 also opposes cuts to the police budget and calls for tougher prison sentences against those who attack emergency workers and repeatedly offend. It also calls for compulsory measures for immigrants to learn Dutch, wants an end to foreign funding of mosques and Islamic schools, and states that people with dual nationality should be stripped of their Dutch citizenship if they join a foreign terrorist group. The party also supports foreign investment and maintaining free trade agreements with other nations in order to stem flows of migration and wants good relations with the United Kingdom following Brexit. JA21 also supports internet freedom and wants to protect the right to online privacy by preventing the government and big tech companies from mining personal data or breaching privacy laws. In terms of culture, the party has expressed opposition to modern architecture and supports restoring historic buildings to their original specifications. In 2022, JA21 campaigned against "de-colonisation" of Dutch history, instead arguing for the protection of national cultural heritage and for free museum admission for Dutch nationals. JA21 is also strongly pro-Israel and following the outbreak of the Gaza war and attacks on Israel called for the expulsion from the Netherlands, or prosecution, of under Article 131 of the Dutch Criminal Code, of pro-Palestine activists, attacking them as "Hamas supporters". The party opposes climate policies.

== Representation ==
=== Members of the House of Representatives ===
- Joost Eerdmans
- Annabel Nanninga
- Ingrid Coenradie
- Michiel Hoogeveen
- Simon Ceulemans
- Diederik Boomsma
- Daniël van den Berg
- Maarten Goudzwaard
- Ranjith Clemminck-Croci

=== Members of the Senate ===
- Karin van Bijsterveld
- Ruben Baumgarten

=== Members of the States Provincial ===
Province	Seats
Drenthe	1 / 41
Flevoland	2 / 41
Friesland	1 / 43
North Brabant	2 / 55
North Holland	3 / 55
Gelderland	2 / 55
Overijssel	2 / 55
(Limburg (Netherlands)) Limburg	2 / 55
South Holland	3 / 55
Zeeland	1 / 55

== Election results ==
=== House of Representatives ===
Election	Lead candidate	List	Votes	%	Seats	+/–	Government
2021	Joost Eerdmans	List	245,859	2.37	3 / 150	New	Opposition
2023	Joost Eerdmans	List	71,345	0.68	1 / 150	▼2	Opposition
2025	Joost Eerdmans	List	628,517	5.95	9 / 150	▲8	Opposition

=== Senate ===
Election	List	Votes	Weight	%	Seats	+/–
2023	List	24	8,289	4.63	3 / 75	New

=== European Parliament ===
Election	List	Votes	%	Seats	+/–	EP Group
2024	List	40,570	0.65	0 / 31	New	–

== See also ==
- Otten Group
- Belang van Nederland
- Pim Fortuyn List
