= Ján Zvonár =

Slovak physician and politician (1951–2023)

Member of the National Council
- In office 7 February 2006 – 8 July 2010

Personal details
- Born: 19 June 1951 Bratislava, Czechoslovakia
- Died: 25 June 2023 (aged 72) Bratislava, Slovakia
- Party: Direction – Social Democracy
- Education: Comenius University

Ján Zvonár (19 June 1951 – 25 June 2023) was a Slovak physician and politician.

Zvonár was born in Bratislava on 19 June 1951. He studied medicine at the Comenius University. He graduated in 1975 and obtained a candidature at the same university in 1986. He specialized in physiotherapy, which he taught at Constantine the Philosopher University in Nitra and the Matej Bel University.

From 2006 to 2010, he was the mayor of the Rača borough of Bratislava and a Member of the National Council, elected on the list of the Direction – Slovak Social Democracy party. In 2009, he was elected to represent the Rača borough at the assembly of the Bratislava Region but he resigned his seat in 2013. After the end of his political career, he became the director of the military healthcare facility at Lešť.

Zvonár died in Bratislava on 25 June 2023, at the age of 72.
