= Marco Pastors =

Dutch civil servant and politician

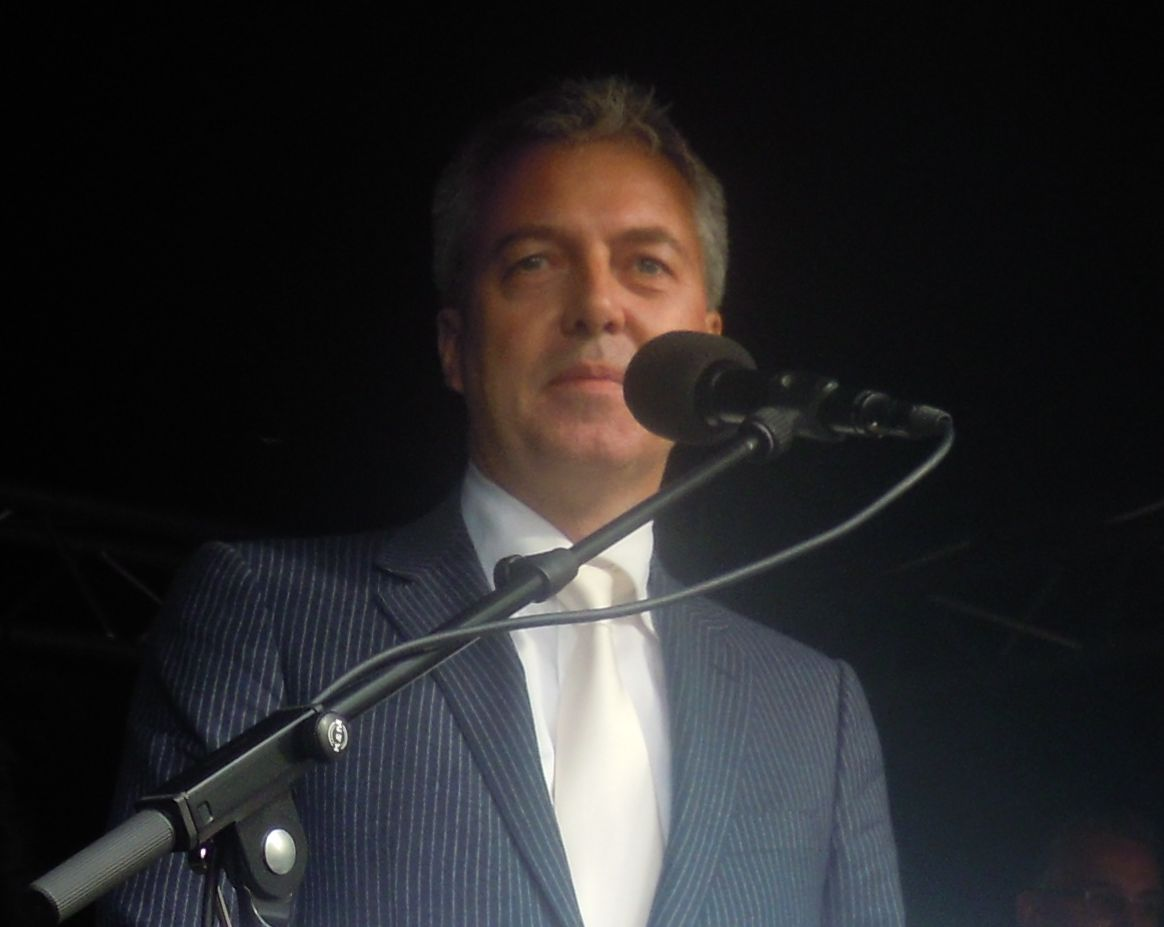

Lead candidate for One NL
- In office August 2006 – November 2006

Member of the municipal council of Rotterdam
- In office 2006–2012

Alderman of the municipality of Rotterdam
- In office 2002–2005

Personal details
- Born: 10 September 1965 Beneden-Leeuwen, Netherlands
- Party: Livable Rotterdam, Eén NL, JA21
- Website: www.eennl.nl

Marcus Gerhardus Theodorus (Marco) Pastors (born 10 September 1965) is a Dutch civil servant and former politician. Since 1 February 2012 he has been director of the Nationaal Programma Kwaliteitssprong Zuid, a project of the city of Rotterdam to improve living conditions in the south of Rotterdam.

Pastors was political leader of the local party Livable Rotterdam (Leefbaar Rotterdam), a member of the city council and also an alderman of the municipality of Rotterdam. Besides he was political leader of One NL (Een NL), a Dutch political party at the national level.

== Early life ==
In his political pamphlet At your service which was published in 2006 he described his catholic and rural upbringing as unremarkable, with his parents' problematic marriage as a recurring theme. He obtained a degree in economics from Erasmus University in 1989 and from 1990 to 1993 he worked for OV-studentenkaart BV (a company managing public transportation for students) then headed by Pim Fortuyn, his future political ally. He then went on to work for Getronics and later on for Zenc (an IT provider for the public sector) of which he was a co-founder.

== Local politics ==
Pastors started his political career in January 2002 when his formed boss Fortuyn was elected leader of Livable Rotterdam (Leefbaar Rotterdam). He was given the responsibility for infrastructure and housing as an alderman and he focused on improving living conditions in some of the Rotterdam slum areas. He introduced measures which allowed tenants to buy their house and also introduced legislation banning prospective residents without a proper income or job prospects given the high unemployment and poverty in some residential area's. Some of these initiatives (called the Rotterdam Wet) were supported by national politicians.

Pastors was critical of the proliferation of mosques, the erection of minarets and was opposed to practises associated with new immigrants with a Muslim background such as honor killings, polygamy, forced marriage and suppression of women. On a regular basis he was challenged for making denigrating remarks at the expense of the Muslim minority and left-wing politicians which he perceived as politically correct.

A denigrating remark regarding immigration and the political party Groen Links in the beginning of 2005 resulted in Pastors colliding with the city council and he was forced to further refrain from public comments on immigration and integration. In October 2005 he again collided with the city council when he commented in a Catholic newspaper that Muslims abused their religion when justifying some of their actions. As a result, the city council forced him out as an Alderman on 8 November 2005. In the 2006 municipal elections in Rotterdam Leefbaar Rotterdam polled about a third of the vote, but lost 3 of their 17 seats and the Pastors-led party therefore moved to the opposition benches.

== National politics ==
In 2006 Pastors started a new political party called Eén NL together with Joost Eerdmans formerly a member of the Lijst Pim Fortuyn that participated in the 2006 Dutch general election. Its main campaign issues were reforms in social security, education and integration of minorities. The party stood for pro law and order, anti bureaucracy. According to the new party new immigrants should understand that Western culture is the dominant culture.

Many of his voters believed Pastors to be "the real heir" to Pim Fortuyn. In a sweeping statement that aroused debate, Pastors said that radical Islam was being appeased in the same way as Nazism was in 1930s Germany. "There are big similarities. There were indications that developments in Germany were going the wrong way; that Germany was preparing for war; that Germany was making the Jews the scapegoat". Pastors criticized customs such as arranged marriages, lack of tolerance of homosexuality and lack of freedom to renounce the Islamic faith. "No one took measures against what Germany was doing. What we are doing is not taking actions against Muslims in quarters where they are living.".

== Electoral history ==
Electoral history of Marco Pastors
Year	Body	Party	Pos.	Votes	Result		Ref.
Year	Body	Party	Pos.	Votes	Party seats	Individual	Ref.
2006	House of Representatives	One NL	1	50,167	0	Lost	
2023	House of Representatives	JA21	37	54	1	Lost	
2025	House of Representatives	JA21	45	220	9	Lost	
