= Milos Zvonar =

Czech-Dutch anesthetist and politician

Member of the House of Representatives
- In office 2002–2003

Personal details
- Born: Miloš Zvonař; 1937 (age 88–89) Prague, Czechoslovakia
- Party: Pim Fortuyn List
- Education: Charles University
- Occupation: Anesthetist, politician

Milos Zvonar (Czech: Miloš Zvonař; born 1937) is a Czech-Dutch anesthetist and former politician for the Pim Fortuyn List (LPF).

== Life and career ==
Zvonar was born in Prague and moved to the Netherlands following the invasion of Czechoslovakia in 1968. He had studied medicine at the Charles University in Prague and later obtained a university certificate as a doctor at the University of Leiden. Zvonar was elected to the House of Representatives in 2002 as a member of the LPF. In parliament he caused a mild stir when he and fellow LPF MP Gerlof Jukema stated they would force-feed Pim Fortuyn's killer Volkert van der Graaf when der Graaf announced his intention to go on a hunger strike. Zvonar stepped down from politics in 2003 and moved back to the Czech Republic. In the book The Children of Pim by Joost Vullings, Zvonar stated the political situation was better in the Czech Republic as there were no Turkish or Moroccan immigrants, and that the Netherlands now resembled a third world country due to high levels of immigration. He added It is not racism at all, we want our country for ourselves. People like this don't suit us at all.
