= Joost Eerdmans =

Dutch politician (born 1971)

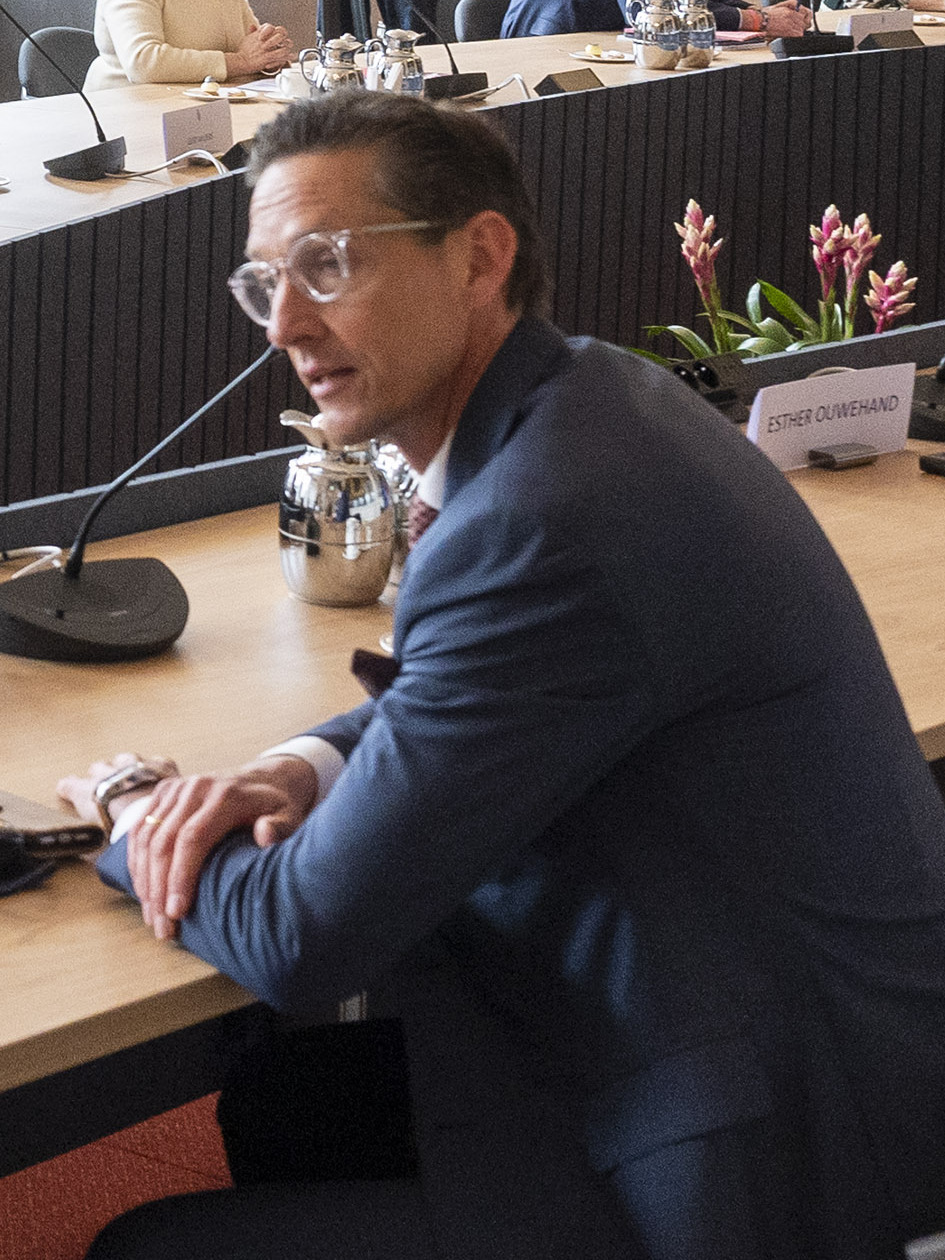
- Eerdmans in 2021

Fifth Deputy Speaker of the House of Representatives
- Incumbent
- Assumed office 20 November 2025
- Preceded by: Thom van Campen

Leader of JA21
- Incumbent
- Assumed office 18 December 2020
- Deputy: Annabel Nanninga
- Preceded by: Position established

Parliamentary leader in the House of Representatives
- Incumbent
- Assumed office 31 March 2021
- In office 25 September 2006 – 30 November 2006

Member of the House of Representatives
- Incumbent
- Assumed office 31 March 2021
- In office 23 May 2002 – 30 November 2006

Personal details
- Born: Bernard Johannes Eerdmans; 9 January 1971 (age 55) Harderwijk, Netherlands
- Party: JA21 (since 2020); Livable Rotterdam (since 2013)
- Other political affiliations: CDA (1996–2002); LPF (2002–2004); Independent (2004–2006); One NL (2006); FvD (until 2020)
- Spouse: Femke Bouma (m. 2006)
- Children: 2
- Education: Erasmus University Rotterdam (MPA); Indiana University (MPA)
- Occupation: Civil servant; Vorstand; television presenter; politician

Bernard Johannes "Joost" Eerdmans (born 9 January 1971) is a Dutch politician and former broadcaster, journalist and civil servant who has led JA21 since 18 December 2020, a party he co-founded with Annabel Nanninga following their departure from Forum for Democracy (FvD). Elected to the House of Representatives in the 2021 general election, he took office on 31 March 2021. Eerdmans had previously served as a member of the House of Representatives from 23 May 2002 until 30 November 2006 for the Pim Fortuyn List (LPF) and as an independent.

== Early life ==
Bernard Johannes Eerdmans was born on 9 January 1971 in Harderwijk in the province of Gelderland in a Reformed family. He graduated at the Christelijk College Nassau-Veluwe. After that, Eerdmans studied Management Science at the Erasmus Universiteit in Rotterdam. In 1995 he received his master's degree, having undertaken postgraduate studies at the Public administration School for Public and Environmental Affairs at Indiana University in Bloomington, Indiana, in 1993. He is the cousin of Dutch author and game show host Theo Eerdmans.

== Professional career ==
After graduating, Eerdmans worked for some time on projects for the Christian Democratic Appeal faction in the Dutch House of Representatives. He was then employed as a civil servant at the Ministry of Justice from 1997 until 1999 and was a staff member to the Director General of the law enforcement department at the Ministry of Justice. In 1999 he became a private secretary to Ivo Opstelten, the Mayor of Rotterdam. After first losing his seat in parliament in 2006, Eerdmans worked in the private sector as a public affairs manager for Deloitte from 2007 to 2009. He was also involved in founding FUTUR an organization of young civil servants.

== Politics ==
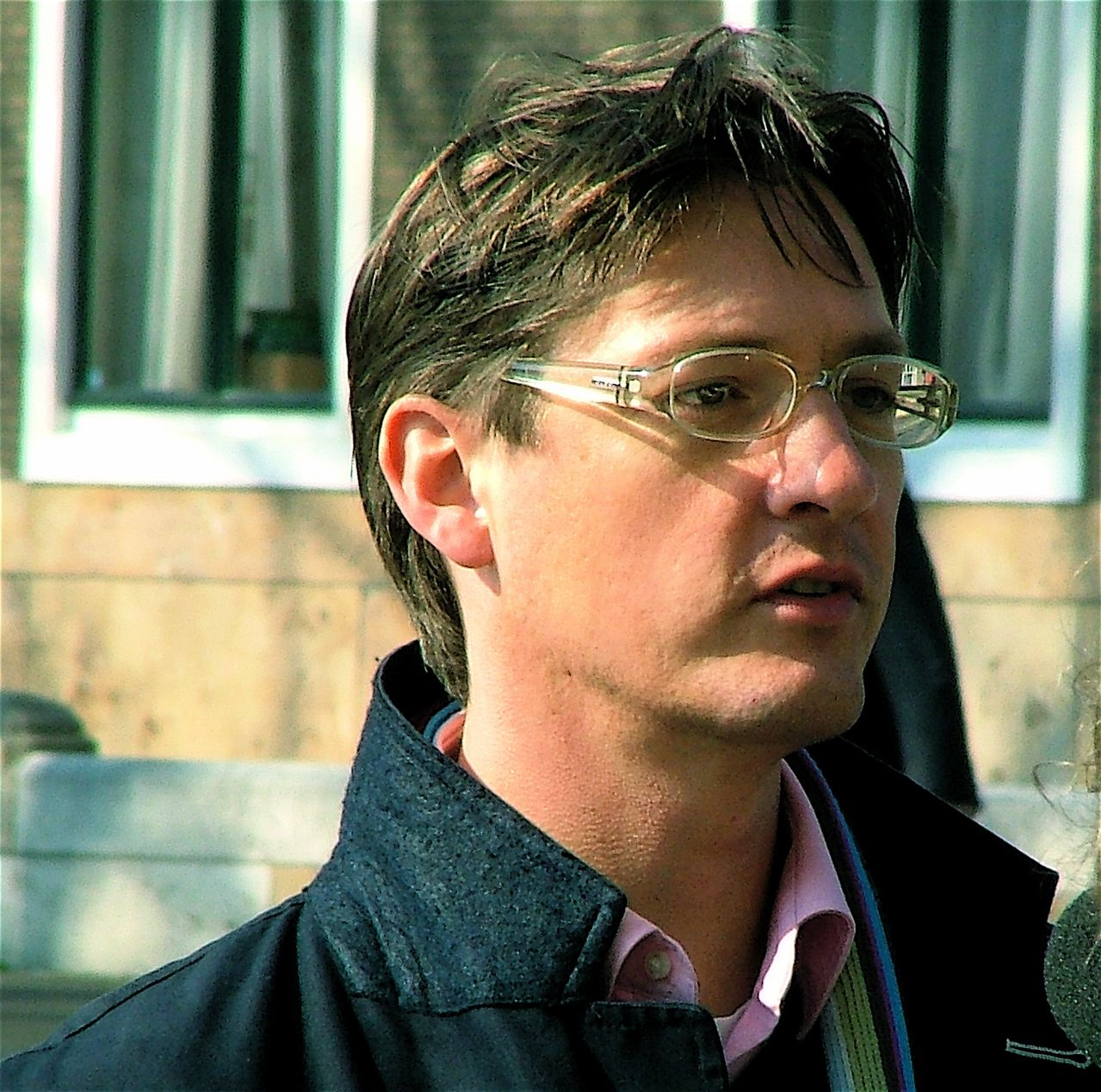
Eerdmans in 2007

=== Pim Fortuyn List ===
Eerdmans first joined the Christian Democratic Appeal but left after disagreeing the CDA's course and saying in his own words "I thought they spoke a different language. I started to dislike it more and more." A week after leaving the Liveable Netherlands party in 2002, Eerdmans contacted Pim Fortuyn, who at that time was busy assembling a list of candidates for his new political party, the Pim Fortuyn List (LPF). Eerdmans was placed nineteenth on the list and after the 2002 election he became a member of the House of Representatives, while his party joined the First Balkenende cabinet. Eerdmans focused on matters related to justice and police. Together with then PvdA MP Aleid Wolfsen, he submitted a bill to punish animal cruelty more severely and argued for increasing minimum sentencing for violent crimes. In 2005, Eerdmans was awarded the Thorbecke Prize from Leiden University which is awarded to the "most eloquent politician."

After the fall of the cabinet, new elections were called. This time the LPF won only eight seats, but since Eerdmans was second on the list he remained in Parliament. He was removed from the party's parliamentary faction after it was definitively announced that Eerdmans would be on the One NL candidate list for the 2006 election.

=== One NL ===
For the 2006 general election, Eerdmans split with the LPF to form a new political party called One NL with Marco Pastors of Leefbaar Rotterdam. After the dismal result of One NL in the 2006 election, Eerdmans left Dutch politics and worked in business before forging a career as a television and radio broadcaster.

=== Leefbaar Rotterdam ===
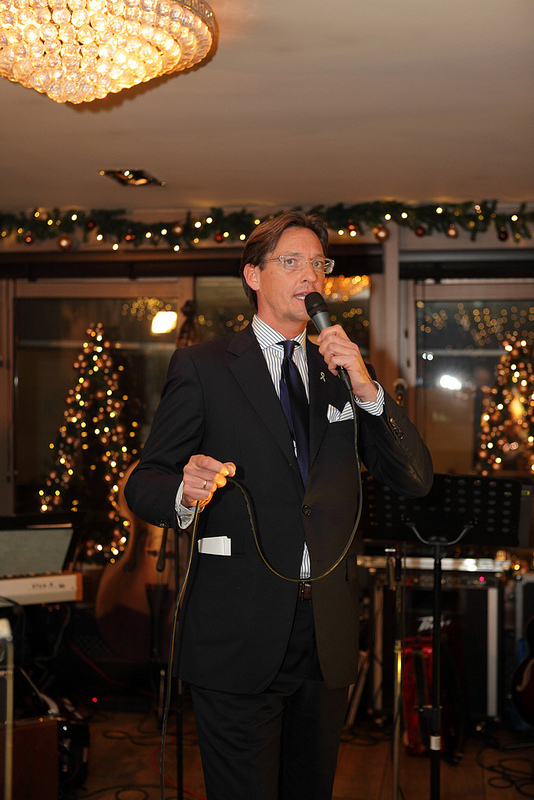
Eerdmans in 2014

Eerdmans made a return to local politics when he was elected lijsttrekker of Leefbaar Rotterdam on 6 October 2013. In the local elections of 2014 Leefbaar Rotterdam became the biggest party in Rotterdam, meaning the party would get the chance to lead the formation of a new coalition. The party subsequently formed a coalition with the Democrats 66 (D66) and Christian Democratic Appeal (CDA), in which Eerdmans became an alderman.

=== Forum for Democracy ===
Eerdmans worked with the Forum for Democracy during the 2018 Dutch municipal elections. For the 2021 general election, Eerdmans announced a return to national politics and was to be fourth on the party list of FvD led by Thierry Baudet. However, before this could be effectuated Eerdmans quit the party soon after the announcement, citing what he saw as the FvD's insufficient handling of antisemitism, homophobia and racism scandals from other party members.

=== JA21 ===
After leaving the Forum for Democracy, Joost Eerdmans founded a new political party, JA21 (Right Answer 2021), together with other former FvD members to contest the 2021 general election. Eerdmans stated that he sought to revive Fortuynism in Dutch politics and said JA21 would follow the original founding ideas of the FvD. He described JA21 as a "a broad people's party on the right" and a "common sense" right-wing party positioned to attract voters who considered the VVD too centrist, the PVV too harsh in tone, and the Forum for Democracy as having become directionless. Eerdmans became the party’s leader and lijsttrekker.

In the 2021 election, JA21 won three seats in the House of Representatives, returning Eerdmans to the House of Representatives for the first time since 2006. During the 2023 Dutch general election JA21 fell to one seat with Eerdmans being the only JA21 MP to return. In September 2024, the House passed a motion by Eerdmans and Chris Stoffer (SGP) to prohibit face coverings during protests, intended to aid police in identifying individuals committing offenses, citing the 2024 pro-Palestinian protests on university campuses in the Netherlands as an example.

The House later approved another motion by Eerdmans requesting that the government revoke the charitable status of the environmental group Extinction Rebellion, arguing that the organisation's activities were unlawful and disruptive.

When the Schoof cabinet introduced its 2025 budget proposal, which included €2 billion in education cuts, Eerdmans collaborated with other centrist and conservative opposition parties in what he referred to as an "unholy alliance". In December 2024, the coalition agreed to reverse €750 million of the planned cuts to secure Senate support. Eerdmans declined to endorse the revised budget. JA21 saw its strongest result to date during the 2025 Dutch general election.

== Political beliefs ==
Eerdmans identifies himself as a proponent of Fortuynism. His political positions include opposition to immigration, multiculturalism, and the European Union, as well as criticism of what he describes as excessive bureaucracy in the state sector. He advocates for stricter law enforcement, a more right-wing approach to climate policy, and a significant reduction in the powers of the EU, including an end to financial transfers from Northern to Southern European member states.

Eerdmans has stated that the Netherlands should adopt an immigration policy requiring newcomers to uphold "Dutch values", and he has expressed approval of Denmark’s immigration model. He has also criticized what he refers to as the "woke movement" in the Netherlands and has accused parties such as Denk, NIDA, and those associated with Sylvana Simons of undermining Western culture.

Eerdmans has said that politicians have an exemplary role and should avoid personal attacks, stating: "Those who throw mud will end up with dirty hands. I am respectful and never hit people below the belt in politics. If you do, you are sidelining yourself. Fortuyn was also a compromise-oriented macher. You should not sell your heart and soul for the plush seats, but if you get the chance to realize your ideals, then it is your duty of honor to do so for your voters."

== Broadcasting career ==
Eerdmans was a television host on the Dutch channel Het Gesprek and has been a columnist for the website GeenStijl. He was also one of the hosts of the Dutch programme TROS Regelrecht and was a presenter on the BNR Newsradio show Peptalk in 2010. He then presented the NPO Radio 1 discussion show Evening Rush Hour from 2010 and 2013. He has made appearances as a panelist on the political satire show Dit Was Het Nieuws (This Was The News) based on the BBC programme Have I Got News For You. In 2025, he participated with other Dutch celebrities in the EO reality documentary show Hell or Hotel in which he volunteered to spend two nights as an inmate in a high security jail as part of a discussion on the Dutch justice and prison systems.

== Personal life ==
Eerdmans is married to Femke Bouka since 2006. He was raised in the Dutch Reformed Church, but later lost his faith and became an atheist; despite this, he and his wife, who is also an atheist, married in church.

== Electoral history ==
Electoral history of Joost Eerdmans
Year	Body	Party	Pos.	Votes	Result		Ref.
Year	Body	Party	Pos.	Votes	Party seats	Individual	Ref.
2002	House of Representatives	Pim Fortuyn List	19	701	26	Won	
2003	House of Representatives	Pim Fortuyn List	2	6,918	8	Won	
2006	House of Representatives	One NL	2	7,046	0	Lost	
2010	Capelle aan den IJssel Municipal Council	Livable Capelle	(Note: Eerdmans participated as a lijstduwer.)	1,029	9	Won (Note: Eerdmans received enough preference votes to be elected despite his party's result.)	
2014	Rotterdam Municipal Council	Livable Rotterdam	1	44,979	14	Won	
2018	Rotterdam Municipal Council	Livable Rotterdam	1		11	Won	
2021	House of Representatives	JA21	1	197,637	3	Won	
2022	Rotterdam Municipal Council	Livable Rotterdam	49	1,975	10	Won	
2023	House of Representatives	JA21	1	53,675	1	Won	
2024	European Parliament	JA21	15	5,994	0	Lost	
2025	House of Representatives	JA21	1	420,505	9	Won	
