= Opinion polling for the 2023 Dutch general election =

In the run-up to the 2023 Dutch general election, various organisations carried out opinion polling to gauge voting intentions in the Netherlands. Results of such polls are displayed in this list.

The date range for these opinion polls are from the 2021 Dutch general election, held on 15–17 March, to election day. The next election was scheduled for March 2025, but, due to the fall of the fourth Rutte cabinet, took place on 22 November 2023. Four main pollsters performed opinion polls on voting intentions in the Netherlands, these being: I&O Research, Ipsos, Kantar and Peil.nl. Peil.nl does not give percentages, only showing seats while the other pollsters do include percentages.

== Projections ==
=== Graphical summary ===
The averages in the graphs below were constructed using polls listed below conducted by the four major Dutch pollsters. The trendlines show local regressions representing seat totals (not vote percentages).

=== Seats ===
There are 150 seats in total, 76 seats are needed for a majority. Parties are denoted with a dash if no indication is given of their level in the polls.

Polling firm	Fieldwork date	Sample size	VVD	D66	PVV	CDA	SP	GL–PvdA		FvD	PvdD	CU	Volt	JA21	SGP	DENK	50+	BBB	BIJ1	BVNL	NSC	Lead	Ref.
Polling firm	Fieldwork date	Sample size	VVD	D66	PVV	CDA	SP	PvdA	GL	FvD	PvdD	CU	Volt	JA21	SGP	DENK	50+	BBB	BIJ1	BVNL	NSC	Lead	Ref.
2023 election	22 Nov 2023		24	9	37	5	5	25		3	3	3	2	1	3	3	0	7	0	0	20	12	
Ipsos	22 Nov 2023	–	24	10	35	5	5	25		3	3	3	2	1	3	3	1	7	0	0	20	10	
Ipsos	22 Nov 2023	–	23	10	35	5	5	26		3	4	3	2	1	3	2	1	7	0	0	20	9	
Peil.nl	21 Nov 2023	6,000+	26	8	29	6	5	28		4	4	3	3	1	2	4	0	6	1	1	19	1	
I&O Research	20–21 Nov 2023	2,473	27	9	28	4	6	27		4	5	3	3	1	3	3	0	5	0	1	21	1	
Ipsos	16–21 Nov 2023	2,260	29	11	27	4	5	24		3	5	4	4	1	3	4	0	6	1	0	19	2	
I&O Research	17–20 Nov 2023	2,473	27	8	26	4	6	27		4	5	4	3	2	3	3	0	6	0	1	21	Tie	
Peil.nl	17–18 Nov 2023	7,000-	26	8	26	6	5	23		5	5	3	4	1	2	4	0	7	1	1	23	Tie	
I&O Research	12–14 Nov 2023	2,323	27	7	20	4	7	23		4	6	3	5	1	4	4	1	8	0	1	25	2	
Ipsos	10–13 Nov 2023	2,052	28	9	17	4	5	23		4	7	5	3	2	3	4	0	9	1	0	26	2	
Peil.nl	10–11 Nov 2023	3,000+	27	7	21	5	4	24		5	4	3	4	1	2	4	0	9	1	1	28	1	
I&O Research	6–7 Nov 2023	2,190	26	8	18	4	6	24		5	5	3	5	1	3	4	0	8	0	1	29	3	
Peil.nl	3–4 Nov 2023	4,200+	26	7	19	4	4	25		5	5	3	4	2	2	3	0	9	1	1	30	4	
Ipsos	27–30 Oct 2023	1,924	28	8	17	4	5	22		4	7	4	3	2	3	4	0	12	1	0	26	2	
Peil.nl	27–28 Oct 2023	4,200+	26	7	19	5	4	24		5	4	4	4	2	2	3	0	9	0	1	31	5	
I&O Research	22–24 Oct 2023	2,225	26	6	19	4	5	25		4	7	3	5	2	3	3	0	11	0	0	27	1	
Peil.nl	20–21 Oct 2023	3,000+	26	7	20	5	4	24		5	4	4	4	2	2	3	0	11	0	1	28	2	
Ipsos	13–16 Oct 2023	1013	28	7	18	4	6	20		4	7	4	3	2	3	4	0	12	1	0	27	1	
Peil.nl	13–14 Oct 2023	3,000+	26	7	20	6	4	24		5	4	4	4	1	2	2	0	12	0	1	28	2	
I&O Research	6–9 Oct 2023	2,293	27	6	18	5	5	26		5	6	3	4	2	3	3	0	11	0	0	26	1	
Peil.nl	6–7 Oct 2023	3,000+	25	7	19	6	4	24		5	5	4	4	1	2	2	0	13	0	1	28	3	
I&O Research	22–25 Sep 2023	2,288	27	5	18	5	5	29		4	6	4	3	1	4	2	0	12	0	0	25	2	
Ipsos	22–25 Sep 2023	1,020	27	9	18	4	5	21		3	7	5	3	3	3	3	0	13	1	0	25	2	
Peil.nl	22 Sep 2023	3,000+	24	7	17	6	4	24		5	6	4	4	2	2	2	1	14	0	1	27	3	
I&O Research	8–11 Sep 2023	2,412	25	6	14	4	5	27		4	7	4	4	1	4	2	1	14	0	0	28	1	
Peil.nl	9 Sep 2023	3,000+	26	7	15	6	4	23		5	7	3	3	2	2	2	0	16	0	1	28	2	
Ipsos	1–4 Sep 2023	1,031	26	10	15	5	3	20		3	9	5	3	3	3	3	0	15	0	0	27	1	
Peil.nl	2 Sep 2023	3,000+	25	7	15	6	4	23		5	7	3	3	1	2	2	0	18	0	1	28	3	
Peil.nl	25–26 Aug 2023	3,000+	25	7	15	5	5	24		5	7	3	3	3	2	2	0	14	0	1	29	4	
I&O Research	23–24 Aug 2023	2,398	22	7	13	3	5	28		3	8	4	3	3	4	3	0	13	0	0	31	3	
	22 Aug 2023	Frans Timmermans elected leader of GL/PvdA for the 2023 general election by members of both parties																					
	20 Aug 2023	Pieter Omtzigt launches a new party for the 2023 general election, New Social Contract																					
Peil.nl	18–19 Aug 2023	3,000+	28	8	19	8	8	26		5	9	4	4	3	3	2	1	21	0	1	–	2	
	14 Aug 2023	Henri Bontenbal appointed CDA leader for the 2023 general election																					
	14 Aug 2023	Dilan Yeşilgöz-Zegerius appointed VVD leader for the 2023 general election																					
	12 Aug 2023	Rob Jetten elected D66 leader for the 2023 general election by its members																					
Ipsos	21–24 Jul 2023	1,004	28	10	19	6	6	27		4	7	5	4	4	3	3	0	24	0	0	–	1	
I&O Research	14–17 Jul 2023	2,736	25	9	15	5	7	28		4	9	5	8	6	4	2	0	21	1	1	–	3	
	17 Jul 2023	Members of the PvdA and GL vote in favour of running on a joint list at the 2023 general election																					
Peil.nl	15–16 Jul 2023	3,000+	25	9	15	7	7	25		5	8	4	6	6	3	2	1	25	1	1	–	Tie	
Peil.nl	15–16 Jul 2023	3,000+	25	8	15	7	6	28 (Note: Frans Timmermans as hypothetical lead candidate)		5	7	4	6	6	3	2	1	25	1	1	–	3	
	13 Jul 2023	Sigrid Kaag announces that she will not serve as D66 leader for the 2023 general election																					
	10 Jul 2023	Mark Rutte announces that he will not serve as VVD leader for the 2023 general election																					
	10 Jul 2023	Wopke Hoekstra announces that he will not serve as CDA leader for the 2023 general election																					
	7 Jul 2023	The Fourth Rutte cabinet falls over a disagreement on asylum policy																					
Peil.nl	30 Jun – 1 Jul 2023	3,000+	20	10	14	6	8	11	14	5	10	4	6	7	3	2	1	27	1	1	–	7	
Ipsos	23–26 Jun 2023	1,022	28	12	15	8	7	9	11	3	10	5	5	6	3	3	1	23	1	0	–	5	
Peil.nl	16–17 Jun 2023	3,000+	20	10	13	6	7	11	14	5	10	4	7	6	3	2	1	29	1	1	–	9	
I&O Research	9–12 Jun 2023	2,364	22	10	12	6	8	11	12	4	8	5	7	8	4	2	1	28	1	1	–	6	
	30 May 2023	2023 Dutch Senate election																					
Ipsos	26–29 May 2023	1,019	29	11	14	6	6	9	13	4	10	5	4	6	3	3	1	25	1	0	–	4	
Peil.nl	19–20 May 2023	3,000+	18	10	10	7	7	11	14	5	9	4	7	6	3	2	1	34	1	1	–	16	
I&O Research	12–15 May 2023	1,872	24	9	13	5	7	11	12	3	12	5	6	7	4	2	2	27	0	1	–	3	
Peil.nl	5–6 May 2023	3,000+	18	10	10	7	7	11	14	5	9	4	6	6	3	2	1	35	1	1	–	17	
Ipsos	21–24 Apr 2023	1,002	26	10	11	6	8	10	12	4	11	5	5	5	3	3	0	30	1	0	–	4	
Peil.nl	21–22 Apr 2023	3,000+	17	10	9	7	7	12	15	5	9	4	6	6	3	1	1	36	1	1	–	19	
I&O Research	14–17 Apr 2023	2,197	19	10	13	7	7	12	13	3	9	4	7	8	3	2	1	31	1	0	–	12	
Peil.nl	1 Apr 2023	3,000+	18	10	9	6	7	12	15	5	9	4	5	6	3	1	2	36	1	1	–	18	
Ipsos	24–27 Mar 2023	1,005	27	12	12	7	7	12	11	4	8	4	4	6	3	3	1	28	1	0	–	1	
Peil.nl	24–25 Mar 2023	3,000+	19	9	9	7	7	12	15	5	9	5	5	7	3	1	2	33	1	1	–	14	
	15 Mar 2023	2023 Dutch provincial elections																					
Ipsos	17–27 Feb 2023	5,291	29	15	16	9	8	10	10	4	9	5	4	9	3	3	1	14	1	0	–	13	
Peil.nl	24–25 Feb 2023	3,000+	21	13	17	7	7	11	13	5	8	5	4	10	4	3	1	19	1	1	–	2	
Peil.nl	17–18 Feb 2023	3,000+	23	12	18	7	7	11	13	5	8	5	4	10	4	3	1	17	1	1	–	5	
I&O Research	10–13 Feb 2023	2,489	24	12	18	7	9	13	12	5	10	5	3	10	4	3	0	14	1	0	–	6	
Peil.nl	10–11 Feb 2023	3.000+	22	12	18	7	7	11	13	5	9	6	4	11	4	3	1	15	1	1	–	4	
Ipsos	27–30 Jan 2023	1,002	29	15	18	11	8	10	10	5	9	4	4	10	3	3	0	10	1	0	–	11	
I&O Research	13–16 Jan 2023	2,489	24	13	19	6	10	9	13	4	8	5	5	12	5	3	0	12	1	1	–	5	
Peil.nl	13–14 Jan 2023	3.000+	20	12	19	6	8	10	12	5	9	6	5	13	4	3	1	15	1	1	–	1	
	13 Jan 2023	Gert-Jan Segers steps down as Leader of the Christian Union and is replaced by Mirjam Bikker																					
Ipsos	16–19 Dec 2022	1,005	27	14	18	9	8	11	12	3	8	5	5	9	4	3	0	13	1	0	–	9	
Peil.nl	16–17 Dec 2022	3.000+	20	12	20	5	8	10	12	5	8	6	5	14	4	3	1	15	1	1	–	Tie	
I&O Research	9–12 Dec 2022	2,142	21	11	18	7	9	11	13	4	10	6	5	13	5	1	1	13	2	0	–	3	
Peil.nl	2–3 Dec 2022	3.000+	21	11	20	5	8	10	12	5	8	6	5	15	4	3	1	14	1	1	–	1	
Ipsos	25–28 Nov 2022	1,040	27	17	19	8	9	10	12	2	9	4	4	9	3	3	0	12	2	0	–	8	
Peil.nl	25–26 Nov 2022	3.000+	20	12	21	5	8	10	12	5	8	6	5	15	4	3	1	13	1	1	–	1	
I&O Research	11–14 Nov 2022	2,069	22	12	18	7	9	11	14	5	8	6	4	12	4	2	1	13	1	1	–	4	
Peil.nl	11–12 Nov 2022	3.000+	20	12	21	5	8	10	12	5	8	6	5	15	4	3	1	13	1	1	–	1	
Ipsos	21–24 Oct 2022	1,021	27	16	21	8	8	11	10	3	10	4	4	9	3	3	0	12	1	0	–	6	
Peil.nl	21–22 Oct 2022	3.000+	21	12	20	6	8	11	12	5	8	6	5	14	4	3	1	12	1	1	–	1	
I&O Research	14–17 Oct 2022	2,205	21	12	19	7	9	11	12	5	10	5	5	10	5	2	1	14	1	1	–	2	
Peil.nl	14–15 Oct 2022	3.000+	21	12	18	6	8	12	12	5	8	6	5	12	4	3	1	15	1	1	–	3	
Ipsos	23–26 Sep 2022	1,003	25	16	20	9	7	12	11	3	10	4	3	8	3	3	0	15	1	0	–	5	
Peil.nl	23–24 Sep 2022	3.000+	21	11	16	6	7	14	12	5	8	6	5	11	4	3	1	18	1	1	–	3	
I&O Research	9–12 Sep 2022	1,789	23	15	16	6	8	11	12	6	7	5	5	12	4	2	1	15	1	1	–	7	
Ipsos	26–29 Aug 2022	1,007	27	18	18	9	7	8	11	4	9	5	2	9	3	3	0	16	1	0	–	9	
Peil.nl	26–27 Aug 2022	3,000+	20	12	17	6	7	12	13	5	9	6	5	9	4	3	1	19	1	1	–	1	
Peil.nl	5–6 Aug 2022	3,000+	21	13	15	6	7	13	13	4	8	7	5	8	4	3	1	19	2	1	–	2	
Ipsos	22–25 Jul 2022	1,009	29	17	18	9	8	9	10	4	9	5	3	6	3	4	0	15	1	0	–	11	
I&O Research	15–18 Jul 2022	1,953	22	14	16	6	9	10	12	4	10	5	5	9	4	3	1	18	1	1	–	4	
Peil.nl	8–9 Jul 2022	3,000+	21	13	15	6	7	12	13	4	8	7	5	8	4	3	1	20	2	1	–	1	
Ipsos	24–27 Jun 2022	1,028	31	16	16	9	9	10	11	5	8	5	4	6	3	4	0	12	1	0	–	15	
Peil.nl	24–25 Jun 2022	3,000+	21	12	15	7	7	12	13	5	8	7	5	8	4	3	1	18	2	2	–	3	
Peil.nl	17–18 Jun 2022	3,000+	22	11	17	7	7	12	13	5	8	7	5	10	4	3	1	14	2	2	–	5	
I&O Research	10–13 Jun 2022	2,151	24	14	15	8	10	11	12	4	9	6	5	10	5	3	0	12	2	0	–	9	
Peil.nl	10–11 Jun 2022	3,000+	23	12	17	7	7	12	12	5	8	7	5	10	4	3	1	13	2	2	–	6	
Ipsos	27–30 May 2022	1,039	33	14	17	11	8	11	10	5	9	6	5	6	3	3	1	7	1	0	–	16	
Peil.nl	27–28 May 2022	3,000+	25	13	16	7	7	12	12	5	8	7	4	11	4	3	1	11	2	2	–	9	
Kantar	25–27 May 2022	1,078	30	13	16	9	6	13	12	4	8	6	6	5	4	4	1	12	1	0	–	14	
I&O Research	13–16 May 2022	2,356	28	13	16	8	8	11	14	5	8	6	5	10	4	3	1	8	1	1	–	12	
Peil.nl	13–14 May 2022	3,000+	25	13	16	7	7	12	12	5	8	7	4	11	4	3	1	11	2	2	–	9	
Ipsos	22–25 Apr 2022	1,013	34	14	14	9	7	11	11	5	10	5	5	8	4	4	1	7	1	0	–	20	
Peil.nl	22–23 Apr 2022	3,000+	27	14	15	7	7	12	12	4	8	7	4	11	4	3	1	10	2	2	–	12	
	12 Apr 2022	Lilianne Ploumen steps down as Leader of the PvdA																					
I&O Research	8–11 Apr 2022	2,403	29	18	13	7	7	11	13	4	8	6	4	10	4	3	2	8	1	2	–	11	
Peil.nl	8–9 Apr 2022	3,000+	26	18	14	8	7	11	12	4	8	7	4	11	4	3	1	10	1	1	–	8	
Peil.nl	1–2 Apr 2022	3,000+	25	18	14	9	7	11	12	4	8	7	4	12	4	3	1	9	1	1	–	7	
Ipsos	25–28 Mar 2022	1,048	33	19	15	9	7	11	10	4	9	5	4	8	4	4	1	6	1	0	–	14	
Peil.nl	25–26 Mar 2022	3,000+	25	18	14	9	7	11	12	4	8	7	4	12	4	3	1	9	1	1	–	7	
Peil.nl	18–19 Mar 2022	3,000+	25	18	14	9	7	11	12	4	8	7	4	12	4	3	1	9	1	1	–	7	
	16 Mar 2022	2022 Dutch municipal elections																					
Peil.nl	11–12 Mar 2022	3,000+	27	20	14	8	8	10	9	5	9	6	4	12	4	3	1	8	1	1	–	7	
Kantar	9–11 Mar 2022	1,197	33	20	13	8	10	11	11	4	7	6	4	8	2	2	2	8	1	0	–	13	
Peil.nl	4–5 Mar 2022	3,000+	27	20	14	8	9	9	9	5	9	6	4	12	4	3	1	8	1	1	–	7	
Ipsos	25–28 Feb 2022	1,025	32	20	17	10	7	10	9	4	9	5	5	8	3	4	1	5	1	0	–	12	
Peil.nl	25–26 Feb 2022	3,000+	25	20	14	7	9	9	9	6	9	6	5	13	4	3	1	8	1	1	–	5	
Peil.nl	18–19 Feb 2022	3,000+	23	20	15	6	9	9	9	7	9	5	7	13	4	3	1	8	1	1	–	3	
I&O Research	11–14 Feb 2022	2,311	27	19	17	6	7	10	11	4	8	6	9	9	4	2	1	8	1	1	–	8	
	13 Feb 2022	Nilüfer Gündoğan is suspended by Volt and opts to continue as an independent																					
Peil.nl	11–12 Feb 2022	3,000+	22	19	15	6	8	9	9	7	9	5	10	13	4	3	1	8	1	1	–	3	
Peil.nl	4–5 Feb 2022	3,000+	22	19	15	6	8	9	9	7	9	5	10	13	4	3	1	8	1	1	–	3	
Kantar	27–31 Jan 2022	1,002	32	20	16	11	8	10	8	6	5	5	6	9	2	2	2	7	1	0	–	12	
Peil.nl	28–29 Jan 2022	3,000+	22	19	15	6	8	9	9	7	9	5	10	13	4	3	1	8	1	1	–	3	
Ipsos	21–24 Jan 2022	1,024	30	19	17	9	7	10	10	6	9	5	7	6	3	3	1	7	1	0	–	11	
Peil.nl	21–22 Jan 2022	3,000+	23	18	17	6	8	9	9	7	9	6	10	11	4	3	1	7	1	1	–	5	
I&O Research	14–17 Jan 2022	2,230	26	17	15	8	8	9	11	5	8	6	10	10	4	2	1	8	1	1	–	9	
Peil.nl	14–15 Jan 2022	3,000+	25	19	18	7	8	9	9	7	9	6	8	9	3	3	1	7	1	1	–	6	
	10 Jan 2022	Prime Minister Mark Rutte and his Fourth cabinet are inaugurated																					
Peil.nl	24–25 Dec 2021	3,000+	27	18	19	7	8	9	9	6	9	6	7	9	3	3	0	8	1	1	–	8	
Kantar	15–20 Dec 2021	1,004	32	16	18	10	11	10	8	4	8	8	7	7	3	1	1	5	1	0	–	14	
Ipsos	17–20 Dec 2021	1,014	31	21	18	8	8	10	8	6	9	5	5	8	3	3	0	6	1	0	–	10	
Peil.nl	17–18 Dec 2021	3,000+	27	18	19	7	8	9	9	6	9	6	7	9	3	3	0	8	1	1	–	8	
Peil.nl	10–11 Dec 2021	3,000+	30	17	19	6	8	10	9	6	9	6	7	7	3	3	0	8	1	1	–	11	
I&O Research	3–6 Dec 2021	2,053	29	18	16	9	8	9	9	4	8	5	10	8	3	1	1	9	2	1	–	11	
Peil.nl	3–4 Dec 2021	3,000+	32	16	20	5	8	10	9	6	9	6	6	7	3	3	0	8	1	1	–	12	
Ipsos	26–29 Nov 2021	1,008	34	20	20	10	9	8	8	4	8	5	5	5	4	3	0	6	1	0	–	14	
Peil.nl	26–27 Nov 2021	3,000+	32	16	20	5	8	10	9	6	9	6	6	7	3	3	0	8	1	1	–	12	
Peil.nl	19–20 Nov 2021	3,000+	32	16	20	5	8	10	9	6	9	6	6	7	3	3	0	8	1	1	–	12	
I&O Research	12–15 Nov 2021	2,021	33	15	17	8	8	9	10	6	7	8	8	6	4	2	0	6	2	1	–	16	
Kantar	5–9 Nov 2021	985	33	20	18	9	8	9	8	6	7	5	7	5	3	3	2	6	1	0	–	13	
Peil.nl	5–6 Nov 2021	3,000+	34	18	20	5	8	10	9	5	9	6	6	5	3	3	0	7	1	1	–	16	
Peil.nl	29–30 Oct 2021	3,000+	34	18	20	5	8	10	9	5	9	6	6	5	3	3	0	7	1	1	–	16	
Ipsos	22–25 Oct 2021	1,026	35	19	19	9	10	9	7	3	10	5	6	6	3	3	0	5	1	0	–	16	
Peil.nl	15–16 Oct 2021	3,000+	34	17	19	5	9	11	9	6	8	6	6	5	3	3	0	7	1	1	–	16	
I&O Research	8–11 Oct 2021	2,052	34	15	16	7	10	11	12	5	8	6	8	7	4	1	0	5	1	0	–	18	
Peil.nl	8–9 Oct 2021	3,000+	34	17	18	5	9	11	9	7	8	7	6	4	3	3	0	7	1	1	–	16	
Peil.nl	1–2 Oct 2021	3,000+	36	17	17	5	9	11	9	6	7	7	6	5	3	3	0	7	1	1	–	16	
Ipsos	24–27 Sep 2021	994	37	19	18	8	8	9	9	4	9	5	6	6	3	3	0	5	1	0	–	18	
Peil.nl	24–25 Sep 2021	3,000+	35	19	17	5	9	11	9	6	7	7	6	4	3	3	0	7	1	1	–	16	
Kantar	17–20 Sep 2021	1,037	33	20	20	7	7	9	11	4	6	6	6	6	3	3	1	7	1	0	–	13	
Peil.nl	17–18 Sep 2021	3,000+	35	20	16	7	8	11	9	5	7	7	5	5	3	3	0	7	1	1	–	15	
I&O Research	10–13 Sep 2021	1,990	33	19	16	7	9	12	11	5	8	7	6	5	3	1	0	6	2	0	–	14	
Peil.nl	10–11 Sep 2021	3,000+	37	19	16	6	9	11	8	5	8	6	5	5	3	3	0	7	1	1	–	18	
Peil.nl	3–4 Sep 2021	3,000+	37	18	16	7	9	11	8	5	8	6	5	5	3	3	0	7	1	1	–	19	
Ipsos	27–30 Aug 2021	1,008	39	21	17	10	7	10	9	4	7	6	5	5	3	3	0	3	1	0	–	18	
Peil.nl	20–21 Aug 2021	3,000+	36	19	17	6	9	11	7	5	8	6	6	5	3	3	0	7	1	1	–	17	
	7 Aug 2021	The Van Haga Group officially launches a new party, BVNL																					
Ipsos	23–26 Jul 2021	1,004	37	22	16	9	9	9	8	3	8	6	5	7	3	3	0	4	1	0	–	15	
Peil.nl	23–24 Jul 2021	3,000+	35	22	17	6	9	10	7	5	8	6	6	5	3	3	0	6	1	1	–	13	
I&O Research	9–12 Jul 2021	1,939	35	22	17	6	9	11	9	4	7	5	6	6	3	2	0	5	2	1	–	13	
Ipsos	25–28 Jun 2021	1,011	39	23	17	9	8	9	7	5	8	5	4	5	3	3	0	4	1	–	–	16	
Peil.nl	25–26 Jun 2021	3,000+	35	22	18	6	9	10	7	5	8	6	6	5	3	3	0	5	2	–	–	13	
Peil.nl	18–19 Jun 2021	3,000+	35	22	18	6	9	10	7	5	8	6	6	5	3	3	0	5	2	–	–	13	
Peil.nl	11–12 Jun 2021	3,000+	35	22	18	8	9	10	7	5	7	5	6	6	3	3	0	4	2	–	–	13	
	12 Jun 2021	Pieter Omtzigt leaves the CDA and continues as an independent																					
I&O Research	4–7 Jun 2021	1,824	36	21	14	12	7	10	9	5	8	5	6	6	3	3	0	3	2	–	–	15	
Peil.nl	4–5 Jun 2021	3,000+	35	22	17	11	9	10	7	4	7	5	6	6	3	3	0	3	2	–	–	13	
Peil.nl	28–29 May 2021	3,000+	34	23	18	11	9	9	7	4	7	5	6	6	3	3	0	3	2	–	–	11	
Ipsos	21–23 May 2021	1,010	36	25	17	13	8	10	6	3	9	4	5	6	3	2	0	2	1	–	–	11	
Peil.nl	21–22 May 2021	3,000+	34	23	18	11	9	9	7	4	7	5	6	6	3	3	0	3	2	–	–	11	
Peil.nl	14–15 May 2021	3,000+	34	23	18	11	9	9	7	4	7	5	6	6	3	3	0	3	2	–	–	11	
	13 May 2021	Wybren van Haga, Hans Smolders and Olaf Ephraim split from Forum for Democracy, forming the Van Haga Group																					
Peil.nl	7–8 May 2021	3,000+	34	23	17	11	9	9	7	8	7	5	5	6	3	3	0	2	1	–	–	10	
	6 May 2021	50+ loses parliamentary representation when Liane den Haan leaves the party and continues as an independent																					
I&O Research	30 Apr – 3 May 2021	1,914	34	23	15	10	10	10	7	7	7	5	6	6	3	3	1	2	1	–	–	11	
Peil.nl	30 Apr – 1 May 2021	3,000+	32	22	18	12	9	9	7	9	7	5	5	6	3	3	0	2	1	–	–	10	
Peil.nl	23–24 Apr 2021	3,000+	32	22	18	12	9	9	7	9	7	5	5	6	3	3	0	2	1	–	–	10	
Ipsos	16–19 Apr 2021	1,014	35	26	18	12	7	9	7	7	8	4	5	4	3	2	1	1	1	–	–	9	
Peil.nl	16–17 Apr 2021	3,000+	32	24	17	14	9	9	7	9	6	5	4	5	3	3	0	2	1	–	–	8	
I&O Research	9–12 Apr 2021	1,738	34	26	15	14	10	8	6	7	6	5	4	6	3	3	1	1	1	–	–	8	
Peil.nl	9–10 Apr 2021	3,000+	31	24	16	14	9	9	7	9	7	5	4	5	3	3	1	2	1	–	–	7	
Peil.nl	2–3 Apr 2021	3,000+	28	25	16	15	9	9	8	9	7	5	4	5	3	3	1	2	1	–	–	3	
Peil.nl	26–27 Mar 2021	3,000+	33	24	16	14	9	9	7	9	6	5	4	5	3	3	1	1	1	–	–	9	
2021 election	17 Mar 2021	–	34	24	17	15	9	9	8	8	6	5	3	3	3	3	1	1	1	–	–	10	

=== Vote share ===
Polling firm	Fieldwork date	Sample size	VVD	D66	PVV	CDA	SP	GL–PvdA		FvD	PvdD	CU	Volt	JA21	SGP	DENK	50+	BBB	BIJ1	BVNL	NSC	Others	Lead	Ref.
Polling firm	Fieldwork date	Sample size	VVD	D66	PVV	CDA	SP	PvdA	GL	FvD	PvdD	CU	Volt	JA21	SGP	DENK	50+	BBB	BIJ1	BVNL	NSC	Others	Lead	Ref.
2023 election	22 Nov 2023		15.1%	6.1%	23.5%	3.3%	3.1%	15.5%		2.2%	2.2%	2.0%	1.7%	0.7%	2.1%	2.3%	0.5%	4.6%	0.4%	0.5%	12.8%	1.1%	8.0%	
Ipsos	22 Nov 2023	–	15.2%	6.4%	22.3%	3.3%	3.3%	16.0%		2.1%	2.5%	2.0%	1.8%	0.8%	2.2%	2.1%	0.8%	4.7%	0.5%	0.6%	12.9%	0.8%	6.3%	
I&O Research	20–21 Nov 2023	2,473	17.4%	6.0%	17.7%	2.6%	4.0%	17.7%		2.8%	3.3%	2.4%	2.2%	0.9%	2.0%	2.2%	0.5%	3.3%	0.3%	0.8%	13.8%	0.2%	Tie	
Ipsos	16–21 Nov 2023	2,260	18.4%	7.5%	17.1%	2.6%	3.2%	15.1%		2.3%	3.5%	3.0%	2.7%	1.1%	2.0%	3.0%	0.4%	4.1%	0.7%	0.4%	12.5%	0.3%	1.3%	
I&O Research	17–20 Nov 2023	2,473	17.1%	5.3%	16.6%	2.8%	4.0%	17.2%		3.0%	3.3%	2.6%	2.5%	1.3%	2.3%	2.2%	0.5%	4.2%	0.5%	1.1%	13.7%	0.3%	0.1%	
I&O Research	12–14 Nov 2023	2,323	17.5%	4.8%	12.9%	2.9%	5.0%	15.0%		2.5%	4.0%	2.2%	3.4%	1.2%	2.6%	2.6%	0.8%	5.2%	0.3%	0.8%	15.8%	0.4%	1.7%	
Ipsos	10–13 Nov 2023	2,052	18.0%	6.1%	11.2%	2.6%	3.2%	14.5%		2.8%	4.4%	3.3%	2.4%	1.3%	2.3%	3.0%	0.5%	6.1%	0.7%	0.4%	16.7%	0.5%	1.3%	
I&O Research	6–7 Nov 2023	2,190	16.6%	5.1%	11.3%	2.8%	4.0%	15.6%		3.2%	3.4%	2.0%	3.4%	0.9%	2.5%	2.6%	0.6%	5.4%	0.5%	1.0%	18.6%	0.5%	2.0%	
Ipsos	27–30 Oct 2023	1,924	18.0%	5.6%	10.6%	2.9%	3.3%	13.7%		2.7%	5.0%	2.7%	2.3%	1.5%	2.2%	3.0%	0.5%	7.7%	0.8%	―	16.8%	0.9%	1.2%	
I&O Research	22–24 Oct 2023	2,225	16.5%	4.0%	11.9%	2.7%	3.6%	16.2%		2.8%	4.4%	2.4%	3.6%	1.3%	2.3%	2.2%	0.5%	7.2%	0.3%	0.6%	17.4%	0.5%	0.9%	
Ipsos	13–16 Oct 2023	1,013	17.9%	4.8%	11.5%	2.9%	3.9%	12.5%		3.0%	4.4%	3.1%	1.9%	1.3%	2.0%	3.1%	0.4%	7.6%	1.0%	―	17.4%	1.3%	0.5%	
I&O Research	6–9 Oct 2023	2,293	16.8%	3.9%	11.6%	3.4%	3.4%	16.3%		3.6%	4.1%	1.9%	3.0%	1.6%	2.3%	2.4%	0.5%	7.5%	0.3%	0.6%	16.5%	0.5%	0.3%	
I&O Research	22–25 Sep 2023	2,288	17.3%	3.7%	11.5%	3.4%	3.6%	18.1%		3.0%	4.0%	2.6%	2.3%	1.0%	2.6%	1.7%	0.4%	7.8%	0.3%	0.6%	16.0%	0.3%	0.8%	
Ipsos	22–25 Sep 2023	1,020	17.2%	6.1%	11.4%	2.9%	3.2%	13.3%		2.4%	4.9%	3.4%	2.1%	2.2%	2.1%	2.4%	0.5%	8.2%	1.0%	―	15.8%	1.0%	1.4%	
I&O Research	8–11 Sep 2023	2,412	16.5%	4.1%	9.1%	2.6%	3.3%	17.6%		2.6%	4.9%	2.6%	2.7%	1.3%	2.6%	1.3%	0.7%	9.0%	0.3%	0.5%	18.0%	0.3%	0.4%	
Ipsos	1–4 Sep 2023	941	17.1%	6.7%	9.5%	3.7%	2.2%	12.7%		2.1%	6.2%	3.3%	2.2%	2.1%	2.3%	2.0%	0.3%	9.5%	0.5%	―	17.3%	0.3%	0.2%	
I&O Research	23–24 Aug 2023	2,398	13.9%	4.5%	8.6%	2.5%	3.5%	18.0%		2.2%	5.2%	2.9%	2.0%	2.1%	2.6%	1.9%	0.5%	8.5%	0.3%	0.4%	20.2%	0.2%	2.2%	
Ipsos	21–24 Jul 2023	1,004	17.5%	6.5%	12.1%	4.0%	3.9%	16.6%		2.5%	4.9%	3.6%	2.7%	2.9%	2.0%	2.4%	0.6%	15.3%	0.3%	–	–	2.1%	0.9%	
I&O Research	14–17 Jul 2023	1,718	15.5%	5.6%	9.5%	3.2%	4.4%	17.0%		2.9%	5.9%	3.5%	5.0%	4.2%	2.9%	1.4%	0.7%	13.1%	0.9%	0.9%	–	3.4%	1.5%	
Ipsos	23–26 Jun 2023	1,022	18.1%	7.7%	9.6%	5.1%	4.8%	5.7%	7.0%	2.2%	6.3%	3.7%	3.6%	4.0%	1.9%	2.2%	0.7%	14.5%	–	1.2%	–	1.6%	3.6%	
I&O Research	9–12 Jun 2023	2,364	13.7%	6.6%	8.0%	4.2%	5.1%	7.3%	7.6%	2.7%	5.5%	3.3%	4.7%	5.5%	2.6%	1.4%	0.7%	17.5%	0.7%	0.7%	–	2.1%	3.8%	
Ipsos	26–29 May 2023	1,019	19.0%	7.3%	9.1%	4.1%	4.1%	6.0%	8.3%	2.7%	6.3%	3.3%	2.6%	3.8%	2.2%	2.1%	0.7%	16.2%	1.2%	–	–	1.1%	2.8%	
I&O Research	12–15 May 2023	1,872	14.9%	5.9%	8.6%	3.2%	4.5%	7.3%	7.4%	1.9%	7.9%	3.6%	4.3%	4.9%	2.6%	1.6%	1.5%	16.8%	0.3%	1.0%	–	1.8%	1.9%	
Ipsos	21–24 Apr 2023	1,002	16.8%	6.7%	7.0%	4.2%	5.0%	6.6%	8.0%	2.5%	6.9%	3.6%	3.3%	3.2%	2.3%	2.2%	0.4%	19.1%	0.7%	–	–	1.5%	2.3%	
I&O Research	14–17 Apr 2023	2,197	11.8%	6.2%	8.0%	4.6%	4.6%	7.8%	8.0%	2.3%	6.0%	2.8%	4.5%	5.3%	2.4%	1.6%	0.8%	19.3%	0.8%	0.4%	–	2.9%	7.5%	
Ipsos	24–27 Mar 2023	1,005	17.2%	7.7%	7.8%	4.6%	4.9%	7.4%	7.0%	3.0%	5.1%	2.5%	2.9%	4.3%	2.3%	2.4%	0.9%	17.9%	0.8%	–	–	1.3%	0.7%	
Provincial elections	15 Mar 2023	–	11.2%	6.3%	5.7%	6.6%	4.2%	8.1%	9.0%	3.1%	4.8%	3.7%	3.0%	4.4%	2.5%	0.6%	2.3%	19.2%	–	1.0%	–	4.3%	8.0%	
Ipsos	17–27 Feb 2023	5,291	18.6%	9.4%	10.5%	6.0%	5.4%	6.4%	6.4%	3.0%	5.7%	3.1%	2.8%	5.7%	2.3%	2.4%	0.8%	9.4%	–	0.9%	–	1.5%	8.1%	
I&O Research	10–13 Feb 2023	2,489	14.8%	7.6%	11.4%	4.8%	5.6%	8.4%	7.8%	3.1%	6.2%	3.3%	2.4%	6.6%	2.8%	1.9%	0.5%	9.0%	0.7%	0.4%	–	2.5%	3.4%	
Ipsos	27–30 Jan 2023	1,002	18.5%	9.8%	11.2%	7.1%	5.1%	6.2%	6.7%	3.5%	6.1%	3.1%	2.6%	6.8%	2.1%	2.0%	0.6%	6.5%	0.7%	–	–	1.5%	7.3%	
I&O Research	13–16 Jan 2023	2,489	15.0%	8.1%	11.5%	3.9%	6.4%	5.9%	8.1%	2.9%	5.4%	3.6%	3.3%	7.6%	3.1%	2.4%	0.3%	7.5%	1.0%	0.8%	–	3.3%	3.5%	
Ipsos	16–19 Dec 2022	1,005	16.9%	8.7%	11.8%	6.0%	5.3%	7.0%	8.0%	2.3%	5.0%	3.3%	3.4%	6.0%	2.6%	1.9%	0.6%	8.4%	1.0%	–	–	1.9%	5.1%	
I&O Research	9–12 Dec 2022	2,142	12.9%	7.3%	11.4%	4.3%	5.6%	6.8%	8.4%	2.5%	6.2%	3.7%	3.5%	8.4%	3.4%	1.0%	1.0%	8.5%	1.2%	0.3%	–	3.6%	1.5%	
Ipsos	25–28 Nov 2022	1,040	17.2%	11.0%	12.0%	5.4%	5.7%	6.5%	7.5%	1.4%	5.8%	3.1%	3.1%	5.8%	2.0%	2.0%	0.6%	7.9%	1.3%	–	–	1.8%	5.2%	
I&O Research	11–14 Nov 2022	2,069	13.6%	7.8%	11.6%	4.6%	5.7%	6.7%	9.1%	3.2%	5.2%	4.1%	2.6%	7.4%	2.8%	1.5%	1.2%	8.4%	1.0%	0.8%	–	2.7%	2.0%	
Ipsos	21–24 Oct 2022	1,021	17.3%	10.3%	13.4%	5.0%	5.5%	6.9%	6.2%	1.9%	6.4%	2.9%	3.0%	5.7%	2.3%	2.1%	0.5%	7.6%	1.1%	–	–	2.0%	3.9%	
I&O Research	14–17 Oct 2022	2,205	13.2%	8.0%	12.4%	4.4%	6.2%	7.1%	8.0%	3.2%	6.5%	3.4%	3.4%	6.7%	3.2%	1.7%	0.7%	9.1%	1.2%	1.0%	–	0.4%	0.8%	
Ipsos	23–26 Sep 2022	1,003	16.1%	10.0%	12.5%	5.7%	4.8%	7.8%	7.2%	2.4%	6.4%	3.0%	2.0%	5.2%	2.3%	2.2%	0.6%	9.4%	0.9%	–	–	1.5%	3.6%	
I&O Research	9–12 Sep 2022	1,789	14.6%	9.6%	10.7%	4.1%	5.1%	7.4%	7.9%	3.8%	4.9%	3.3%	3.6%	7.8%	2.6%	1.6%	0.8%	9.9%	1.1%	1.0%	–	0.3%	3.9%	
Ipsos	26–29 Aug 2022	1,007	17.1%	11.3%	11.5%	5.8%	4.8%	5.5%	7.1%	2.7%	5.8%	3.4%	1.5%	6.1%	2.3%	2.2%	0.6%	10.1%	0.7%	–	–	1.5%	5.6%	
Ipsos	22–25 Jul 2022	1,009	18.7%	11.0%	11.5%	5.6%	5.1%	5.8%	6.3%	2.8%	6.1%	3.4%	2.1%	4.2%	2.3%	2.7%	0.5%	9.6%	0.9%	–	–	1.5%	7.2%	
I&O Research	15–18 Jul 2022	1,953	14.0%	8.7%	10.0%	3.9%	5.9%	6.3%	7.5%	2.8%	6.4%	3.6%	3.2%	5.8%	2.9%	2.2%	1.1%	11.5%	1.2%	0.9%	–	2.2%	2.5%	
Ipsos	24–27 Jun 2022	1,028	19.4%	10.2%	10.3%	5.8%	5.9%	6.3%	7.3%	3.6%	5.3%	3.3%	2.9%	3.9%	2.4%	2.7%	0.7%	7.8%	0.8%	–	–	1.4%	9.1%	
I&O Research	10–13 Jun 2022	2,151	15.3%	8.7%	9.5%	5.5%	6.2%	7.2%	7.6%	2.9%	5.5%	3.8%	3.7%	6.7%	3.1%	2.1%	0.4%	7.7%	1.5%	0.3%	–	2.0%	7.7%	
Ipsos	27–30 May 2022	1,039	20.7%	9.3%	10.8%	7.2%	5.5%	6.9%	6.8%	3.2%	5.8%	4.0%	3.5%	4.4%	2.2%	2.5%	0.7%	4.8%	0.7%	–	–	1.4%	9.9%	
Kantar	25–27 May 2022	1,078	19.0%	8.0%	10.0%	6.0%	4.0%	9.0%	8.0%	3.0%	5.0%	4.0%	4.0%	4.0%	3.0%	3.0%	1.0%	8.0%	1.0%	–	–	0.0%	9.0%	
I&O Research	13–16 May 2022	2,356	17.4%	8.3%	9.7%	5.2%	5.3%	6.7%	8.7%	3.3%	5.3%	4.1%	3.3%	6.6%	2.7%	2.1%	0.7%	5.5%	1.0%	1.0%	–	3.0%	7.7%	
Ipsos	22–25 Apr 2022	1,013	21.2%	9.1%	9.1%	6.0%	4.9%	6.9%	7.0%	3.2%	6.4%	3.5%	3.5%	5.2%	3.1%	3.1%	0.8%	4.6%	0.8%	–	–	1.8%	12.1%	
I&O Research	8–11 Apr 2022	2,403	17.8%	11.1%	8.1%	4.5%	4.8%	6.9%	8.5%	2.8%	5.5%	4.3%	3.0%	6.2%	2.5%	2.2%	1.3%	5.8%	0.9%	1.3%	–	2.8%	6.7%	
Ipsos	25–28 Mar 2022	1,048	20.6%	12.2%	9.3%	6.0%	4.6%	7.0%	6.6%	2.8%	6.0%	3.6%	3.0%	5.3%	2.6%	3.0%	0.8%	4.0%	0.9%	–	–	1.8%	8.4%	
Local elections	16 Mar 2022	–	11.6%	8.7%	0.9%	11.2%	2.8%	7.8%	8.4%	1.1%	2.0%	3.9%	0.7%	0.2%	2.3%	1.0%	0.6%	–	0.6%	0.3%	–	35.9%	24.3%	
Kantar	9–11 Mar 2022	1,197	21.0%	13.0%	8.0%	5.0%	7.0%	7.0%	7.0%	3.0%	5.0%	4.0%	3.0%	5.0%	2.0%	1.0%	2.0%	5.0%	1.0%	–	–	0.0%	8.0%	
Ipsos	25–28 Feb 2022	1,025	20.0%	12.8%	10.8%	6.9%	4.8%	6.5%	5.7%	3.0%	5.7%	3.6%	3.2%	5.3%	2.4%	2.8%	1.0%	3.2%	0.7%	–	–	1.6%	7.2%	
I&O Research	11–14 Feb 2022	2,311	16.8%	11.9%	10.3%	3.9%	4.8%	6.3%	6.8%	3.0%	5.1%	3.9%	5.5%	5.9%	2.8%	1.6%	1.1%	5.5%	1.2%	0.9%	–	2.4%	4.9%	
Kantar	27–31 Jan 2022	1,002	21.0%	13.0%	10.0%	8.0%	5.0%	6.0%	6.0%	4.0%	4.0%	4.0%	4.0%	6.0%	2.0%	2.0%	1.0%	5.0%	1.0%	–	–	0.0%	8.0%	
Ipsos	21–24 Jan 2022	1,024	19.2%	11.8%	10.7%	6.0%	4.5%	6.3%	6.8%	4.2%	6.0%	3.4%	4.6%	4.3%	2.5%	2.3%	0.9%	4.7%	0.8%	–	–	1.0%	7.4%	
I&O Research	14–17 Jan 2022	2,230	17.0%	11.3%	9.7%	5.2%	5.1%	5.9%	7.1%	3.3%	5.1%	4.0%	6.4%	6.3%	2.8%	1.6%	1.3%	5.4%	1.3%	0.7%	–	2.0%	5.7%	
Kantar	15–20 Dec 2021	1,004	21.0%	10.0%	12.0%	7.0%	8.0%	7.0%	6.0%	3.0%	5.0%	6.0%	5.0%	4.0%	2.0%	1.0%	1.0%	3.0%	1.0%	–	–	0.0%	9.0%	
Ipsos	17–20 Dec 2021	1,014	19.6%	13.1%	11.5%	5.5%	5.1%	6.8%	5.3%	4.0%	5.7%	3.7%	3.2%	5.4%	2.3%	2.4%	0.5%	3.8%	0.9%	–	–	1.2%	6.5%	
I&O Research	3–6 Dec 2021	2,053	18.2%	11.3%	10.0%	5.6%	5.2%	6.0%	5.8%	2.6%	5.0%	3.3%	6.1%	5.0%	2.4%	1.0%	1.1%	6.1%	1.4%	0.8%	–	3.0%	6.9%	
Ipsos	26–29 Nov 2021	1,008	21.4%	12.8%	12.5%	6.7%	5.7%	5.2%	5.4%	2.8%	5.4%	3.5%	3.5%	3.6%	2.5%	2.3%	0.5%	4.2%	0.7%	–	–	1.3%	8.6%	
I&O Research	12–15 Nov 2021	2,021	20.1%	9.3%	10.7%	4.9%	5.4%	6.1%	6.3%	4.2%	4.4%	4.9%	5.4%	4.1%	2.8%	1.6%	0.6%	4.5%	1.3%	0.7%	–	2.5%	9.4%	
Kantar	5–9 Nov 2021	985	21.0%	13.0%	11.0%	6.0%	5.0%	6.0%	6.0%	4.0%	5.0%	3.0%	5.0%	4.0%	2.0%	2.0%	1.0%	4.0%	1.0%	–	–	0.0%	8.0%	
Ipsos	22–25 Oct 2021	1,026	21.6%	12.0%	12.0%	6.0%	6.3%	5.9%	4.8%	2.4%	6.0%	3.6%	4.0%	4.0%	2.0%	2.4%	0.5%	3.5%	1.1%	–	–	1.9%	9.6%	
I&O Research	8–11 Oct 2021	2,052	21.2%	9.3%	9.7%	4.2%	6.0%	7.1%	7.3%	3.3%	4.8%	4.2%	5.0%	4.2%	2.8%	0.7%	0.5%	3.8%	1.1%	0.6%	–	4.3%	11.5%	
Ipsos	24–27 Sep 2021	994	23.3%	12.1%	11.3%	5.5%	5.3%	5.9%	5.7%	3.0%	5.9%	3.4%	3.9%	3.7%	1.9%	2.5%	0.4%	3.5%	1.0%	–	–	1.7%	11.2%	
Kantar	17–20 Sep 2021	1,037	21.0%	13.0%	13.0%	5.0%	5.0%	6.0%	7.0%	3.0%	4.0%	4.0%	4.0%	4.0%	3.0%	3.0%	1.0%	5.0%	1.0%	–	–	0.0%	8.0%	
I&O Research	10–13 Sep 2021	1,990	20.4%	11.8%	10.3%	4.7%	6.1%	7.7%	6.8%	3.0%	5.2%	4.8%	3.9%	3.5%	2.2%	1.0%	0.4%	4.3%	1.6%	0.6%	–	1.6%	8.6%	
Ipsos	27–30 Aug 2021	1,008	24.6%	13.5%	10.9%	6.5%	4.5%	6.3%	5.8%	2.9%	5.0%	3.9%	3.2%	3.5%	2.4%	2.4%	0.3%	2.4%	0.7%	–	–	1.2%	11.1%	
Ipsos	23–26 Jul 2021	1,004	23.3%	13.7%	10.5%	6.2%	5.9%	5.7%	5.0%	2.5%	5.3%	3.8%	3.5%	4.5%	2.3%	2.4%	0.6%	2.8%	1.0%	–	–	1.0%	9.6%	
I&O Research	9–12 Jul 2021	1,939	21.5%	13.7%	10.4%	4.1%	6.0%	7.2%	5.9%	3.0%	4.7%	3.5%	3.9%	4.0%	2.4%	1.6%	0.3%	3.5%	2.0%	1.2%	–	1.1%	7.8%	
Ipsos	25–28 Jun 2021	1,011	24.6%	14.2%	10.8%	6.1%	5.3%	6.1%	4.9%	3.5%	5.1%	3.4%	3.0%	3.2%	2.4%	2.4%	0.6%	2.8%	0.7%	–	–	0.9%	10.4%	
I&O Research	4–7 Jun 2021	1,824	22.8%	13.5%	9.2%	7.9%	4.8%	6.5%	5.7%	3.5%	5.0%	3.5%	4.4%	3.9%	2.2%	2.0%	0.5%	2.3%	1.5%	–	–	1.0%	9.3%	
Ipsos	21–23 May 2021	1,010	22.9%	15.9%	11.1%	8.7%	5.2%	6.4%	4.3%	2.3%	5.7%	3.1%	3.2%	4.0%	2.4%	1.5%	0.5%	1.3%	0.8%	–	–	0.7%	7.0%	
I&O Research	30 Apr – 3 May 2021	1,914	21.5%	14.3%	9.9%	6.4%	6.5%	6.4%	5.0%	5.0%	4.4%	3.5%	3.9%	3.8%	2.0%	2.2%	0.7%	1.8%	1.3%	–	–	1.1%	7.2%	
Ipsos	16–19 Apr 2021	1,014	22.5%	16.7%	11.7%	7.7%	4.5%	6.3%	4.7%	4.5%	5.2%	3.2%	3.4%	2.9%	2.2%	1.5%	0.8%	0.8%	0.7%	–	–	0.8%	5.8%	
I&O Research	9–12 Apr 2021	1,738	21.6%	16.5%	9.5%	8.8%	6.4%	5.3%	4.2%	4.7%	4.3%	3.4%	3.0%	3.8%	2.1%	1.9%	0.8%	1.0%	1.1%	–	–	1.5%	5.1%	
2021 election	17 Mar 2021	–	21.9%	15.0%	10.9%	9.5%	6.0%	5.7%	5.2%	5.0%	3.8%	3.4%	2.4%	2.4%	2.1%	2.0%	1.0%	1.0%	0.8%	–	–	2.0% (Note: CO with 0.4%, NIDA and Splinter with 0.3%, others with 1.0%)	6.9%	

=== Hypothetical scenarios ===
==== GroenLinks and PvdA merge into a single left-wing party ====
Polling firm	Fieldwork date	Sample size	VVD	D66	PVV	CDA	SP	GL/PvdA	FvD	PvdD	CU	Volt	JA21	SGP	DENK	BBB	BIJ1	Others	Lead	Ref.
I&O Research	11–14 Nov 2022	2,069	15.2%	6.3%	11.4%	3.8%	5.1%	20.3%	3.8%	5.1%	3.8%	2.5%	7.6%	2.5%	1.3%	7.6%	1.3%	2.5%	5.1%	
I&O Research	10–13 Sep 2021	2,207	19.4%	10.3%	10.0%	4.7%	5.7%	19.7%	4.2%	2.4%	4.9%	2.5%	3.6%	2.5%	1.2%	4.4%	2.7%	1.8%	0.3%	

==== Pieter Omtzigt joins BBB ====
Pieter Omtzigt has stated he would not join BBB.

Polling firm	Fieldwork date	Sample size	VVD	D66	PVV	CDA	SP	GL/PvdA		FvD	PvdD	CU	Volt	JA21	SGP	DENK	50+	BBB	BIJ1	BVNL	Others	Lead	Ref.
Polling firm	Fieldwork date	Sample size	VVD	D66	PVV	CDA	SP	PvdA	GL	FvD	PvdD	CU	Volt	JA21	SGP	DENK	50+	BBB	BIJ1	BVNL	Others	Lead	Ref.
Peil.nl	26 Mar 2023	4,000+	18	8	6	5	5	10	14	4	8	5	4	4	2	1	1	53	1	1	0	35	

==== Pieter Omtzigt returns to CDA ====
Pieter Omtzigt has stated he would not return to CDA.

Polling firm	Fieldwork date	Sample size	VVD	D66	PVV	CDA	SP	GL/PvdA		FvD	PvdD	CU	Volt	JA21	SGP	DENK	50+	BBB	BIJ1	BVNL	Others	Lead	Ref.
Polling firm	Fieldwork date	Sample size	VVD	D66	PVV	CDA	SP	PvdA	GL	FvD	PvdD	CU	Volt	JA21	SGP	DENK	50+	BBB	BIJ1	BVNL	Others	Lead	Ref.
I&O Research	14–17 Jul 2023	1,728	23	8	13	17	6	26		4	9	3	7	6	4	2	1	19	1	1	0	3	

==== Pieter Omtzigt's party ====
This scenario occurred on 19 August when Omtzigt founded the New Social Contract party.

Polling firm	Fieldwork date	Sample size	VVD	D66	PVV	CDA	SP	GL/PvdA		FvD	PvdD	CU	Volt	JA21	SGP	DENK	50+	BBB	BIJ1	Pieter Omtzigt List	BVNL	Lead	Ref.
Polling firm	Fieldwork date	Sample size	VVD	D66	PVV	CDA	SP	PvdA	GL	FvD	PvdD	CU	Volt	JA21	SGP	DENK	50+	BBB	BIJ1	Pieter Omtzigt List	BVNL	Lead	Ref.
Peil.nl	18–19 Aug 2023	3,000+	25	8	15	6	6	24		5	8	3	4	2	2	2	1	12	0	27	0	2	
I&O Research	14–17 Jul 2023	1,728	20	7	10	4	3	21		3	7	3	5	4	4	2	0	11	0	46	0	25	
Peil.nl	15–16 Jul 2023	3,000+	23	8	12	5	5	22		5	7	3	5	4	3	2	0	15	1	29	1	6	
Peil.nl	15–16 Jul 2023	3,000+	23	7	12	5	4	26		5	6	3	5	4	3	2	0	15	1	28	1	2	
Peil.nl	26 Mar 2023	4,000+	18	8	7	5	4	9	13	4	7	4	4	5	3	1	1	17	1	38	1	20	
Peil.nl	18 Dec 2022	3,000+	19	12	16	3	5	8	11	5	7	4	4	9	4	3	0	8	1	30	1	11	
Peil.nl	16 Oct 2022	3,000+	20	12	14	4	6	10	11	4	8	4	4	8	4	3	0	8	1	28	1	8	
Peil.nl	7 Aug 2022	3,000+	19	12	13	4	5	11	12	4	7	6	5	6	4	3	1	11	2	24	1	5	
Peil.nl	27 Mar 2022	3,000+	23	17	11	7	5	9	11	4	7	6	4	8	4	3	0	5	1	26	0	3	
I&O Research	8–11 Oct 2021	2,052	20	9	10	4	6	7	7	4	5	4	5	4	2	1	–	4	1	20	4	Tie	
Peil.nl	12 Sep 2021	3,000+	34	18	12	6	6	9	7	4	6	5	4	3	3	3	0	3	1	25	1	9	
Peil.nl	4 Apr 2021	3,000+	26	25	12	8	7	7	8	7	6	4	3	3	2	3	0	1	1	27	–	1	
Peil.nl	28 Mar 2021	3,000+	32	22	13	9	7	8	7	7	5	4	3	3	2	3	0	1	1	23	–	9	

== See also ==
- Opinion polling for the 2017 Dutch general election
- Opinion polling for the 2021 Dutch general election
