= Paul Meijer (politician) =

Dutch politician

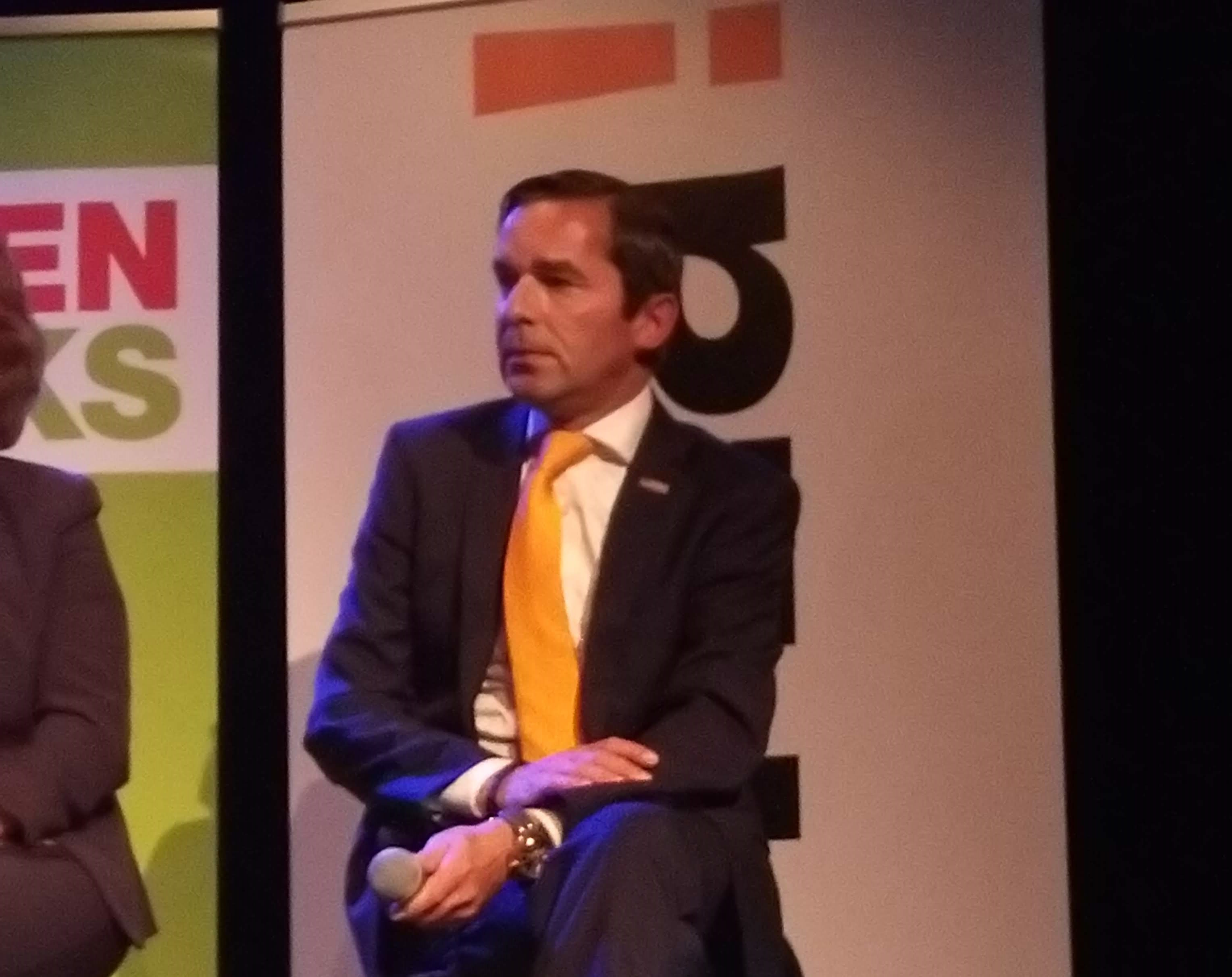

Personal details
- Born: 25 October 1967 (age 58) Dronten, Netherlands
- Party: Pim Fortuyn List (2002-2004); Forza! Netherlands (2003-2021); Party for the Netherlands (2006); Belang van Nederland (since 2021)
- Education: Bell College Maastricht (defunct)
- Occupation: Politician

Paul Meijer (25 October 1967) is a Dutch politician who was the leader and chairman of the regional Forza! Netherlands party. Since 2021 he has been a member of Belang van Nederland.

In November 2022, the court of North Holland ordered Paul Meijer to repay more than €32,691.95 to his former party Forza!. The judge considered it proven that Meijer had systematically embezzled party funds between 2017 and 2020 and spent it on private matters.

== Political career ==
=== Pim Fortuyn List ===
Meijer began his political in the Pim Fortuyn List (LPF). He was elected as a councilor in the municipality of Haarlemmermeer for the LPF and represented the local government sector on the party's national council.

=== Forza! Netherlands ===
Meijer left the LPF after its loss in the 2003 general election and founded Forza! Netherlands with fellow former LPF politician Fleur Agema, who was elected to the North Holland provincial council. Forza! claims to be based on the core principles of the LPF. Agema subsequently joined the newly formed Party for Freedom in 2006. Meijer remained party chairman and a councilor for Forza! Netherlands in Haarlemmermeer. He spoke at the official commemoration for the murdered Theo van Gogh in 2004.

In 2017, Meijer filed a police report over homophobic expressions. In 2018, he filed a police report after the wheels of his car had been loosened. In 2021, Meijer was expelled from the Forza! Haarlemmermeer faction over disputes with its new chairman Erik Vermeulen.

=== Party for the Netherlands ===
In 2006, Meijer was on the Tweede Kamer elections list of Party for the Netherlands, led by Hilbrand Nawijn. The party, another spinoff of the LPF, was not elected into the national parliament.

=== Belang van Nederland ===
In 2021, Meijer joined the Belang van Nederland party founded by Wybren van Haga.
