= Nawijn =

Nawijn is a Dutch surname which was changed from the French name Navin. The family descends from the French Huguenot Firmin Navin who moved to Amsterdam in 1696, one of the many Huguenots fleeing religious oppression after the revocation of the Edict of Nantes by Louis XIV.

== People ==
- Hilbrand Nawijn, a Dutch politician and former Member of the Dutch House of Representatives, and until June 22, 2005, a member of Pim Fortuyn List.
