= Nawijn Group =

Right-wing Dutch faction

The Nawijn Group (Dutch: Groep Nawijn) was a Dutch right-wing Fortuynist political faction founded by Hilbrand Nawijn, a member of the House of Representatives, which existed from 2005 to 2006.

== History ==
It was founded in June 2005 when Nawijn split from his previous party, the Pim Fortuyn List (LPF). It remained a one-man faction in the Parliament until August 2006 when LPF parliamentary leader Gerard van As joined Nawijn after also leaving the LPF. Nawijn also participated in the 2006 Zoetermeer municipal council election; his list won five seats under the name Lijst Hilbrand Nawijn, but like Livable Rotterdam and the LPF both led by Pim Fortuyn in the 2002 elections, these are separate entities.

In August 2006 Nawijn announced his plans to participate in the 2006 general election as the lead candidate of the newly-founded Party for the Netherlands (Partij voor Nederland, PvN). However, after Van As left the party following internal disagreement, the PvN failed to win a seat at the election.
