= Forza! Nederland =

Fortuynist Organization for a Realistic Pragmatic Approach Fortuynistische Organisatie tot een Realistische Zakelijke Aanpak
- Abbreviation: Forza! Netherlands
- Leader: Paul Meijer (2004–20); Erik Vermeulen (2020–22); Ralph Castricum (2022–)
- Founded: 19 February 2004
- Split from: Pim Fortuyn List
- Headquarters: Hoofddorp; Taurusavenue 100; Haarlemmermeer
- Ideology: Right-wing populism Populism; Fortuynism
- Colours: Black; Orange

Website
- www.forza.nu

Forza! Nederland (an abbreviation of Fortuynistische Organisatie voor een Realistische Zakelijke Aanpak) is a Dutch right-wing populist political organisation active in the Netherlands. Despite the name, the party has no connection to Forza Italia.

Forza! is active in several municipalities in the Netherlands and was represented in the Provincial Council of North Holland until 2015. Forza! is known to be as one of the successors of the former Pim Fortuyn List and very outspoken against Islam, refugees and in favor of referendums and can be considered as a local counterpart of or alternative to the Party for Freedom and JA21.

== History ==
=== 2003–2009 ===
The party's history began in 2003 when Paul Meijer and Fleur Agema were disbarred from the States-Provincial Pim Fortuyn List. Meijer and Agema founded the party to participate in the 2006 elections, but failed to raise the money needed to participate. In 2006, Agema left the party and joined the Party for Freedom (PVV) of Geert Wilders. Forza! participated in the 2006 Dutch municipal elections in Haarlem and Haarlemmermeer but won no seats in any municipalities.

Forza! tried to cooperate with Rita Verdonk's Trots op Nederland but the differences between the two parties could not be resolved so it stranded.

=== 2010–2014 ===
In the Dutch municipal elections of 2010, Forza! again participated in Haarlemmermeer and Haarlem. In Haarlem the party won no seats. In Haarlemmermeer the party won three seats in the municipal council. Forza! chairman Paul Meijer became the group leader.

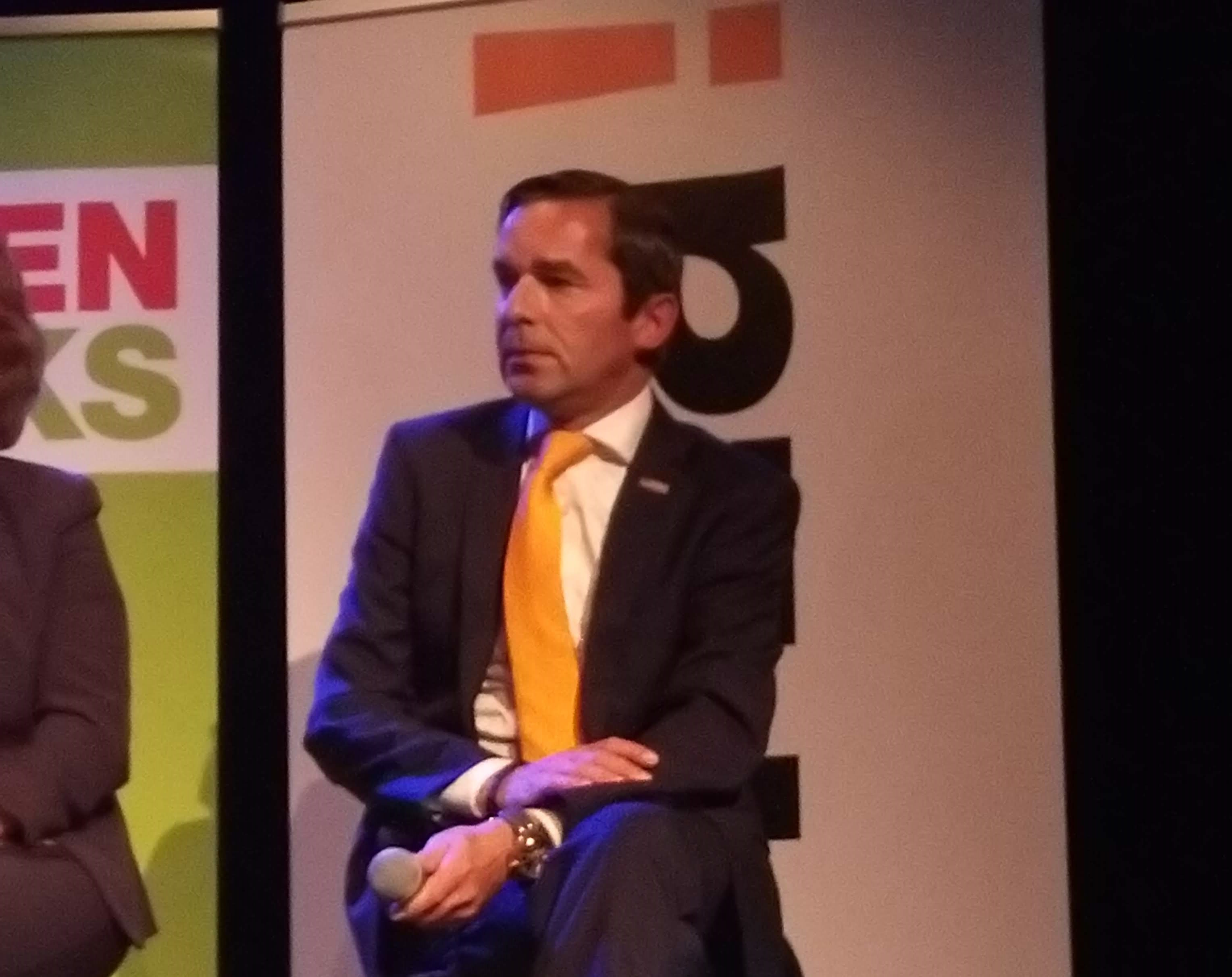
Paul Meijer, 2018

In late 2012, Forza! Netherlands also gained a seat in the Provincial Council of North Holland. Monica Nunes switched from the Party for Freedom to Forza! and represented the political organisation. In 2015 she was disbarred after not showing up in the provincial council for almost a year. Forza! did not return in the provincial council to give the PVV a chance to grow. The party later officially declared that they were against the form of a provincial council and wanted to abolish this.

In 2014, Forza! announced that the organisation would not contest national elections anymore and would only be active in various municipalities. In the 2014 municipal elections, the party grew from three to four seats in Haarlemmermeer, but lost two of these six months later after a conflict between Meijer and two other Forza! councillors. The party also participated in Velsen as Forza! IJmond and won two seats.

=== 2015–2019 ===
In 2015, a councillor of a local party in Spijkenisse joined Forza!, and in 2016 a councillor in Castricum joined the party, giving Forza! representation in four different municipalities. In 2017, Forza! chairman Meijer announced that the party would also participate in the municipalities of Maassluis and Enschede in the 2018 municipal elections. However, the local leaders of the two cities stopped their campaigns just before the elections because of personal threats.

In 2018, Forza! won one seat in the city of Castricum and went from two to three seats in the city of Velsen. In the city of Spijkenisse, Forza! lost all her seats. The election in Haarlemmermeer resulted in five seats, making Forza! the third biggest party. However, it was left out of participation in the municipal executive.

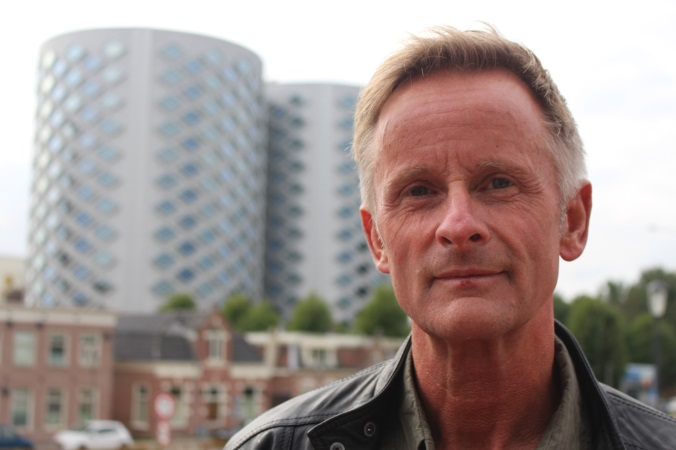
Erik Vermeulen, party leader 2020–2022

=== Since 2020 ===
In 2020, a battle of directions broke out in the party. Some board members accused Paul Meijer of abusing the municipal council group budget. After an integrity report was made against him to the municipality, he was placed on non-active status and replaced by Forza! Haarlemmermeer council member Jordy Schaap. The group in Haarlemmmermeer fell apart into different camps, whereby two Forza! councillors left the party in October. In January 2021, the two separated members returned to the party and Meijer was expelled from the municipal council group and the national party. His party chairmanship had ended in december 2020 and the new board, now consisting of Ralph Castricum and Erik Vermeulen decided not to let Meijer rejoin Forza! Both Meijer and the other board members subsequently claimed to represent the party. Meijer went to court and demanded that Forza! was returned to him and that a board chosen by him was to be appointed as the rightful party board. However, the national Court ruled that Meijer was in the wrong and that the party did not belong to him alone. In November 2022 Meijer was also convicted for fraud from the party treasury and ordered to repay an amount of 32,692 euros. Meijer, by then, had switched to the political party Belang van Nederland.

At the 2022 Dutch municipal elections, Forza! lost one seat in Velsen, two in Haarlemmermeer and gained one in Castricum. The party was later also active in De Bilt and Rucphen.

== Organization ==
Until 2014, Forza! was a party with members and people could become a member. After 2014 the party no longer accepted new membership applications. The members of the association are only those sitting on the party board. In 2021 that decision was reversed by the current party board.
