= Navin =

Navin is a surname of various origins. In some cases, it is a Hebrew surname, whose Dutch derivative is Nawijn. In other cases, the surname is derived from the Gaelic surnames Mac Cnáimhín and Ó Cnáimhín.

== People with the surname ==
- Alireza Navin (born 1961), Iranian politician
- Ashwin Navin (born c.1977), American businessman of Indian origin
- Frank Navin (1871–1935), American accountant
- Hilbrand Nawijn (born 1948), Dutch politician
- John P. Navin, Jr. (born 1968), American actor
- Richard J. Navin (1934–2006), American artist
