= Olaf Ephraim =

Dutch investment banker and politician

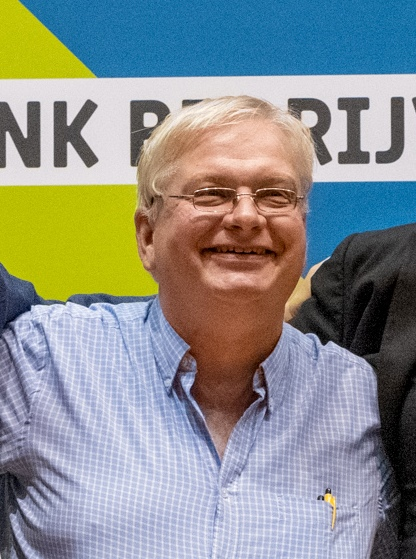
- Ephraim in 2019

Member of the House of Representatives
- In office 31 March 2021 – 5 December 2023

Personal details
- Born: Olaf René Ephraim; 30 September 1965 (age 61) Rotterdam, Netherlands
- Party: Belang van Nederland (since 2021)
- Other political affiliations: Forum for Democracy (2017–2021)
- Spouse: Mieke Wennekes
- Children: 2
- Education: University of Amsterdam
- Occupation: Investment banker

Olaf René Ephraim (Note: Some sources spell his last name as Ephraïm.) (born 30 September 1965) is a Dutch investment banker and politician. He worked for the banks MeesPierson and Fortis before joining the conservative and right-wing populist party Forum for Democracy (FvD). Ephraim served as the party's treasurer and was elected to the House of Representatives in the 2021 general election. He left Forum for Democracy in May 2021 and joined Wybren van Haga's new political party Belang van Nederland (BVNL). He left its parliamentary caucus ahead of the 2023 general election, continuing as an independent politician, but he retained his membership of BVNL.

== Early life and education ==
He was born in the Dutch port city of Rotterdam. His father was a physician, who had helped Jewish children who had gone into hiding during World War II. Ephraim grew up in the region the Gooi and attended the secondary school Het Baarnsch Lyceum, located in Baarn, at gymnasium level between 1978 and 1983. Ephraim subsequently studied at the University of Amsterdam, obtaining a propedeuse in law in 1985 and a degree in business economics in 1987.

== Career ==
Ephraim started his career as head fixed income at the private bank Pierson, Heldring & Pierson, which became MeesPierson in 1993 after a merger. He served as a strategic planner and senior risk manager starting in 1994. When Fortis acquired MeesPierson in 1996, Ephraim was named managing director of MeesPierson Trading Partners. He started working as co-head of Global Securities Lending and Arbitrage (GSLA), which would become Fortis's most profitable division, in 1999. Investigative journalism platform Follow the Money reported that GSLA made a large part of its profits due to a tax fraud scheme based on dividend stripping that was discovered by the CumEx-Files.

Ephraim and the other director of GSLA, Frank Vogel, were fired in April 2005. According to Fortis, they were unwilling to cooperate with a reorganization that would transfer GSLA to Fortis's merchant banking division, while Vogel's legal counsel argued that Fortis wanted to get rid of Ephraim and Vogel because of their bonus scheme. Due to his bonuses, Ephraim earned almost twice as much as the CEO of Fortis. A judge called the bank's behavior incorrect, saying that it had no good reason for the dismissals and saying that the firings had been unnecessarily humiliating. The court ordered Fortis to pay the directors over €900,000 each in severance pay, while they had demanded €7 million each. Ephraim and Vogel announced new legal procedures in order to receive unpaid bonuses worth millions and compensation for reputational damage.

After having left Fortis, Ephraim became an informal investor, being the owner of Superzaken Investments, and besides served on the board of directors of the Deminor Active Governance Fund between 2007 and 2015. He later also became a guest teacher at the Academy for Banking and Insurance, a cooperation between the University of Amsterdam and NIBE-SVV.

== Politics ==
Ephraim became a Forum for Democracy member in 2017 and joined its board as treasurer in November 2019, a few months after the previous treasurer, Henk Otten, had been expelled from the party. It was announced in October 2020 that Ephraim would appear sixth on Forum for Democracy's party list in the 2021 general election.

The following month, newspaper Het Parool published an article about antisemitic messages in WhatsApp groups of the party's youth organization. Ephraim and two others were chosen by the youth organization to investigate the matter. Het Parool reported that Ephraim had before been involved in the expulsion of whistleblowers after a report by HP/De Tijd from April, that was also about extremist messages by members of the youth organization. After the revelations about antisemitic messages, several prominent Forum for Democracy members accused party leader Thierry Baudet of having made extremist comments during a dinner. Ephraim, one of four board members, defended Baudet by saying that Baudet had made provocative statements, but that he is no "fascist, homophobe, or Nazi sympathizer". A stalemate was reached when two board members backed Baudet and the two others opposed him. A referendum about Baudet's future was subsequently held, and he received the support of 76% of the voting members. Ephraim rose to spot three on the 2021 general election party list due to prominent members leaving Forum for Democracy because of the events.

=== House of Representatives ===
He was elected member of the House of Representatives in the March 2021 election with 989 preference votes and was sworn in on 31 March. Ephraim had stepped down as treasurer in January but stayed on as a board member. In the House, he was his party's spokesperson for finances, the euro, and culture, and he served on the following committees:

- Art committee
- Contact group Germany
- Contact group United Kingdom
- Committee for European Affairs
- Committee for Finance
- Public Expenditure committee

Ephraim announced on 13 May 2021 that he would leave Forum for Democracy together with fellow MPs Wybren van Haga and Hans Smolders due to "a difference of opinion (...) about how to engage in politics". In the previous week, Van Haga had denounced a Liberation Day poster by the party, which suggested that the Netherlands had lost its post-WWII freedom due to the COVID-19 lockdown. Party leader Baudet had refused to apologize for the poster and had called causing controversy an integral part of FvD. The three MPs continued as independent politicians and formed a caucus called Groep Van Haga. Ephraim also left all committees that he had been a member of with the exception of the Art committee. When Van Haga founded a new party called Belang van Nederland (BVNL) some time later, Ephraim joined it. He was one of the party's lijstduwers in Amsterdam in the 2022 municipal elections.

When the collapse of the fourth Rutte cabinet led to a November 2023 snap election, BVNL did not include Ephraim in its list of candidates. Ephraim subsequently left Groep Van Haga on 2 August as a result of an internal conflict, and he continued as Lid Ephraim (Member Ephraim), the 21st caucus in parliament. He told he would remain a member of BVNL.

== Personal life ==
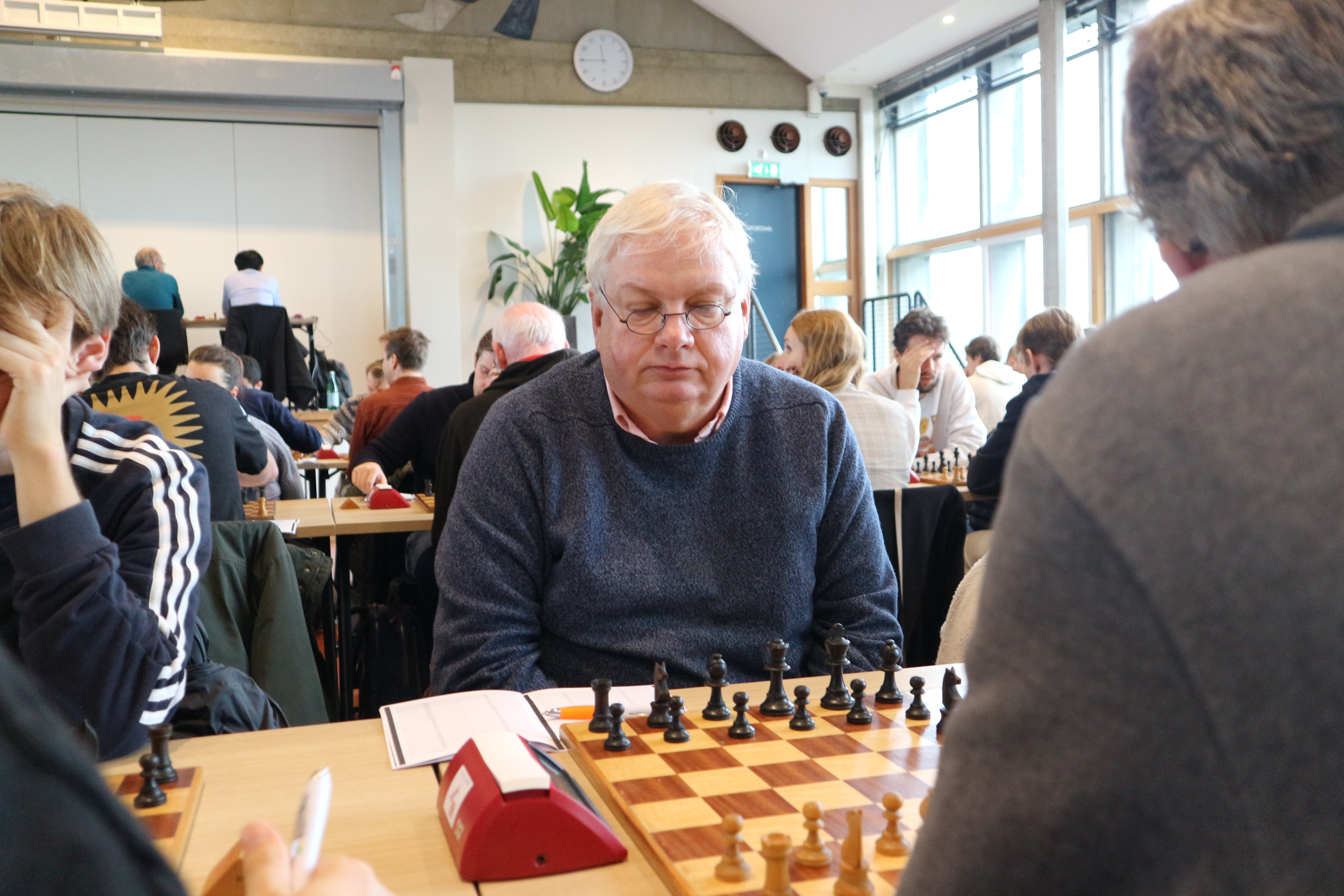
Ephraim at the 2023 Amsterdam Chess Open

Ephraim is a resident of the Dutch capital Amsterdam. He is married to Mieke Wennekes, who works in the financial sector, and he has two daughters. He has been playing chess since his youth and has participated in multiple editions of the Tata Steel Chess Tournament. His FIDE rating reached a high of 2,105 in April 2013. Ephraim also performed on stage as a comedian in the early 2000s.
