= Chris Faddegon =

Dutch politician (born 1954)

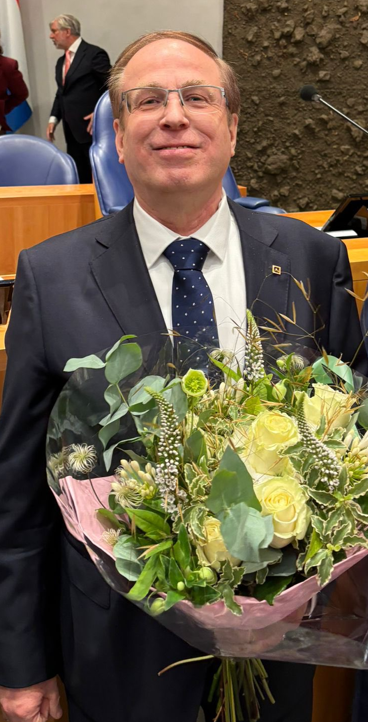
- Chris Faddegon in 2024

Member of the House of Representatives
- In office 4 July 2024 – 11 November 2025
- Preceded by: Fleur Agema

Personal details
- Born: 18 August 1954 (age 71) Delfzijl, Netherlands
- Party: Party for Freedom
- Occupation: Politician

Chris Faddegon (born 18 August 1954) is a Dutch politician for the Party for Freedom who served as a member of the House of Representatives between July 2024 and November 2025. He succeeded Fleur Agema, who had been appointed health minister in the Schoof cabinet, and he was his party's spokesperson for finance, financial markets, and government spending.

== House committee assignments ==
- Committee for Defence (vice chair)
- Committee for Kingdom Relations
- Public Expenditure committee
- Committee for Finance
- Committee for Asylum and Migration

== Electoral history ==
Electoral history of Chris Faddegon
Year	Body	Party	Pos.	Votes	Result		Ref.
Year	Body	Party	Pos.	Votes	Party seats	Individual	Ref.
2023	House of Representatives	Party for Freedom	38	71	37 / 150	Lost (Note: Faddegon was appointed to the body later during the term due to a vacancy.)	
2025	House of Representatives	Party for Freedom	40	72	26 / 150	Lost	
2026	The Hague Municipal Council	Party for Freedom	1	1,711	0 / 45	Lost	

== See also ==
- List of members of the House of Representatives of the Netherlands, 2023–2025
