= Hans Smolders =

Dutch politician and former ice hockey player (born 1960)

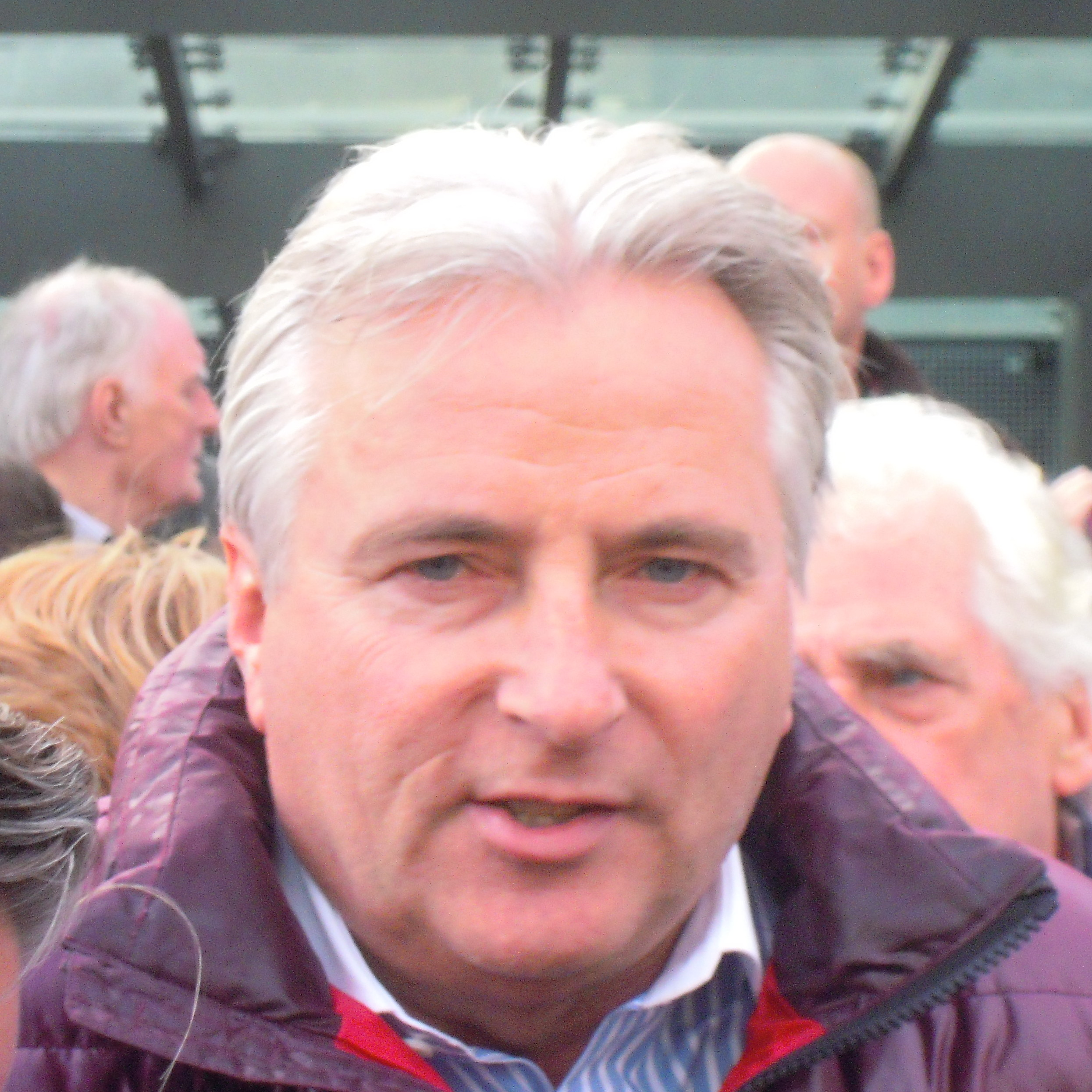
- Smolders at a demonstration against the parole of Volkert van der Graaf in 2014

Member of the House of Representatives
- In office 31 March 2021 – 5 December 2023
- In office 23 May 2002 – 30 January 2003

Member of the States of North Brabant
- Incumbent
- Assumed office 28 March 2019

Member of the Tilburg municipal council
- Incumbent
- Assumed office 27 March 2014
- In office 16 March 2006 – 11 March 2010

Personal details
- Born: Henricus Adrianus Josephus Smolders; September 15, 1960 (age 65) Tilburg, Netherlands
- Party: Belang van Nederland; Smolders List (2003–2004, 2005–present)
- Other political affiliations: Pim Fortuyn List (2002–2003); Tilburg Elderly Party (2004–2005); One NL (2006); Forum for Democracy (2019–2021)
- Domestic partner: Jacqueline
- Children: 2
- Profession: Refrigeration mechanic

Henricus Adrianus Josephus "Hans" Smolders (born 15 September 1960) is a Dutch politician, former professional ice hockey player and entrepreneur.

He worked as a refrigeration mechanic until he sold his company in 2001. The next year, he was elected to be a member of the House of Representatives for the Pim Fortuyn List (LPF). He served in this position for less than a year. Since then, Smolders has been active in local politics in his hometown of Tilburg, having been a member of the municipal council for most of this period. In 2019, he was elected to the States of North Brabant for Forum for Democracy and he returned to the House of Representatives after the 2021 general election. During his years as a refrigeration mechanic, Smolders also was a professional ice hockey player, having played multiple matches for the Dutch national ice hockey team.

== Early life and career ==
Smolders was born on 15 September 1960 in Tilburg. His father was a mailman. Smolders attended vocational school, and graduated in 1977. In the following five years, he received two degrees in refrigeration, one from a college in 's-Hertogenbosch and one from a college in Ede. Alongside, Smolders worked as a refrigeration mechanic. After his education, he kept working in that field, and started his own company in 1984. Smolders sold his company, called "Smol Koeling", in 2001, causing him to declare himself financially independent.

During that same time, Smolders was an ice hockey player for the Tilburg Trappers, playing a total of 341 games between 1977 and 1986. Furthermore, he was part of the Dutch junior ice hockey team and of the national ice hockey team, playing in 13 international matches for the latter team between 1978 and 1983.

== Political career ==
=== National ===
==== Pim Fortuyn List ====
Smolders was a candidate in the 2002 general election as a member of the Pim Fortuyn List. He was the 16th person on the candidate list of that party. During the election season, he was Pim Fortuyn's driver. Nine days before the election, Fortuyn was assassinated by Volkert van der Graaf. As Fortuyn's driver, Smolders witnessed the event, and he followed the suspect afterwards until Van der Graaf was arrested by a police tactical unit. After the election, he became a member of the Pim Fortuyn List in the House of Representatives. He left the lower house in January 2003.

==== OneNL ====
In September 2006, it was announced Smolders would stand for the new party EénNL which had been founded by Marco Pastors and fellow former LPF parliamentarian Joost Eerdmans. Smolders requested a lower position down the party's list and said he wanted to be elected independently via preference votes. Although Smolders collected a high score of preference votes, EénNL did not secure enough overall votes to gain any seats and he left politics soon after.

==== Forum for Democracy and BVNL ====
Smolders was elected to the House again in the 2021 general election on behalf of Forum for Democracy. Shortly after his election, he left the Forum for Democracy in protest against the party releasing a poster comparing the COVID-19 lockdown measures to the Nazi occupation of the Netherlands. In an interview Smolders said that while he agreed with the FvD's political ideas the situation within the party had become "unworkable" due to Baudet's communication and leadership style, and the poster had been released without any consultation with the party's MPs. He subsequently joined the independent Van Haga Group in parliament with Wybren van Haga and Olaf Ephraim which was later established as Belang van Nederland. In June 2021, Smolders made his maiden speech to the House concerning abolishing the dog tax.

Ahead of the 2023 Dutch general election Smolders said he intended to retire from the House of Representatives citing health. He noted that due to ongoing cancer treatment he had been only able to attend one debate in total but he would remain active for BVNL to help with its election campaign and would stand as the lijstduwer or last candidate on the list. In December 2023 he resigned his seat entirely.

=== Municipal ===
At the end of 2003, he founded his own local political party called the Smolders List. In April 2004, Smolders said a man showed up at his home armed with a gun, saying he should leave politics. Smolders said he would stop as party leader because of the incident. The perpetrator was never found. Smolders joined the local Tilburg Elderly Party (TOP) at the end of 2004, saying he would be active within the party and opened up the possibility of running for a seat in the Tilburg municipal council for that party.

Smolders participated with his own party, List Smolders, in the March 2006 municipal elections. His party won 5 out of 39 seats in the Tilburg municipal council, and he became a member of the council. While he was still a member of the municipal council, Smolders appeared on the ballot during the November 2006 general election. Smolders was the 19th person on the candidate list of the party One NL, which was founded a few months before the elections. However, the party did not win any seats in the House of Representatives. Smolders remained a council member in Tilburg.

Smolders clashed with mayor Ruud Vreeman, who he accused of corruption and mismanagement. When Smolders was investigated for corruption (see #Legal affairs), he said the investigation was started by Vreeman as an excuse for mistakes Vreeman had made regarding the renovation of a local theater. Vreeman resigned because of the scandal surrounding the Midi Theater in October 2009 after a censure motion by the municipal council. When the next municipal elections took place in 2010, Smolders decided his party would not participate. He stated this was for health reasons.

Smolders re-entered politics in 2014, when he participated again with his party List Smolders in the municipal elections. He said it was his duty as a citizen to stop mismanagement. His party won five out of the 45 seats in the Tilburg municipal council, causing Smolders to become a member of the council once more. In 2017, Smolders was chosen "politician of the year" by the readers of the local news website Tilburgers.nl. During the next elections in 2018, his party received a plurality in the Tilburg municipal council. His party's seat number doubled to 10. Smolders called it a "historic victory". Although his party won the most seats in the municipal council of any party, it did not become part of the coalition that makes up the executive board. A demonstration against the fact Smolders's party was excluded was held in April and reportedly attracted about one hundred protestors including Smolders himself.

=== Provincial ===
Smolders appeared on the ballot during the 2019 Dutch provincial elections as lijstduwer of Forum for Democracy (FvD) in the province North Brabant. As lijstduwer, he appeared on place 15 on FvD's list for the election and he said he wanted to be elected with preferential votes. Smolders received 20,833 preferential votes, enough to become a member of the States of North Brabant, and was sworn in on March 28. Forum for Democracy received nine out of 55 seats in the States, becoming the second biggest party behind the VVD. Smolders remains a member of the Tilburg municipal council.

== Legal affairs ==
In 2007, the mayor, Ruud Vreeman, filed charges against Smolders for leaking confidential information about alleged drug trade in a nightclub. Smolders defended himself by saying the information should not have been confidential in the first place. Shortly after, Smolders charged Vreeman with fraud. He alleged the mayor wrongfully provided redundancy pay for former members of the municipal council. The court said Smolders kept leaking after he was charged, and he was given a fine of €750 on appeal.

In October 2009, Smolders was investigated after he was accused of leaking a report about the Midi Theater to several media outlets. The report, which criticized mayor Vreeman for holding back information about cost overruns, was made public three days after the leaking occurred. Smolders was not prosecuted, as no evidence was found he was behind the leaking.

That same month, a Dutch governmental unit investigating corruption started an investigation into Smolders. According to the accusation, Smolders had asked a developer a €75,000 bribe to vote in favor of a project to build a shopping mall in Tilburg. The developer subsequently informed mayor Vreeman. Smolders denied the accusation of corruption. He said that he suspected Vreeman had been bribed into supporting the project, and that he wanted to test whether he would also be able to get a bribe from the company. According to Smolders, this was a failed plan to expose Vreeman's alleged corruption. In February 2010, it was announced that Smolders would not be prosecuted as no hard evidence was found.

== Personal life ==
Smolders lives together with his partner, Jacqueline. They have one daughter and one son, who were born in 1988 and 1990 respectively.

== Electoral history ==
Electoral history of Hans Smolders
Year	Body	Party	Pos.	Votes	Result		Ref.
Year	Body	Party	Pos.	Votes	Party seats	Individual	Ref.
2002	House of Representatives	Pim Fortuyn List	16	2,553	26	Won	
2006	House of Representatives	One NL	19	1,492	0	Lost	
2021	House of Representatives	Forum for Democracy	4	5,344	8	Won	
2023	House of Representatives	Belang van Nederland	50 (Note: Smolders participated as lijstduwer.)	249	0	Lost	
