= Willem van der Velden =

Dutch businessman and politician

Member of the House of Representatives
- In office 23 May 2002 – 30 January 2003

Personal details
- Born: 22 April 1942 Rotterdam, Netherlands
- Died: 27 October 2013 (aged 71) The Hague, Netherlands
- Party: Democrats 66 (1966–1970); VVD (1970–2000); Pim Fortuyn List (LPF) (2003–2006); Party for the Netherlands (2006–2008); Trots op Nederland (2010)
- Occupation: Politician

Willem van der Velden (22 April 1942 – 27 October 2013) was a Dutch politician who served as a member of the House of Representatives from 2002 to 2003.

Van der Velden was chairman of the Dutch motorists' organization Pro Auto. From 2002 to 2003, he was a member of the House of Representatives on behalf of the Pim Fortuyn List. In parliament, he focused on matters related to Transport, Public Works and Water Management, Antillean Affairs and Finance. In 2006 he became a member of The Hague City Council for the LPF. When the LPF was disbanded in 2008, he continued as an independent councillor. In 2006, he was a candidate for the House of Representatives for Party for the Netherlands which had been founded by former LPF politician Hilbrand Nawijn and served as secretary of the party, but was not elected. In 2010, he allied himself with the Trots op Nederland party founded by Rita Verdonk.
