= Léon de Jong =

Dutch politician (born 1982)

Member of the House of Representatives
- In office 23 March 2017 – 11 November 2025
- In office 17 June 2010 – 20 September 2012

Personal details
- Born: Léon Willem Evert de Jong; 31 August 1982 (age 43) Gouda, Netherlands
- Party: Party for Freedom
- Domestic partner: Fleur Agema (2014–present)
- Children: 1

Léon Willem Evert de Jong (born 31 August 1982) is a Dutch politician and singer and a former musician and salesman. As a member of the Party for Freedom (Partij voor de Vrijheid), he sat in the House of Representatives, firstly from 17 June 2010 to 19 September 2012 and then again from 2017 to 2025. He has been focused on income since his re-election in 2023.

De Jong completed a degree in retail marketing and worked in retail and finance. He was also active in the music industry and was part of the Dutch pop rock singing duo In Front, before entering into politics in 2010.

In 2014, De Jong led the Party for Freedom in the city council of The Hague, where he served as council member.

== Personal ==
De Jong has a relationship with PVV deputy prime minister Fleur Agema with whom he has a daughter.

== Electoral history ==
Electoral history of Léon de Jong
Year	Body	Party	Pos.	Votes	Result		Ref.
Year	Body	Party	Pos.	Votes	Party seats	Individual	Ref.
2010	House of Representatives	Party for Freedom	19	424	24	Won	
2012	House of Representatives	Party for Freedom	17	435	15	Lost	
2017	House of Representatives	Party for Freedom	17	291	20	Won	
2021	House of Representatives	Party for Freedom	4	1,991	17	Won	
2023	House of Representatives	Party for Freedom	13	1,182	37	Won	
