= Fleur Agema =

Dutch politician (born 1976)

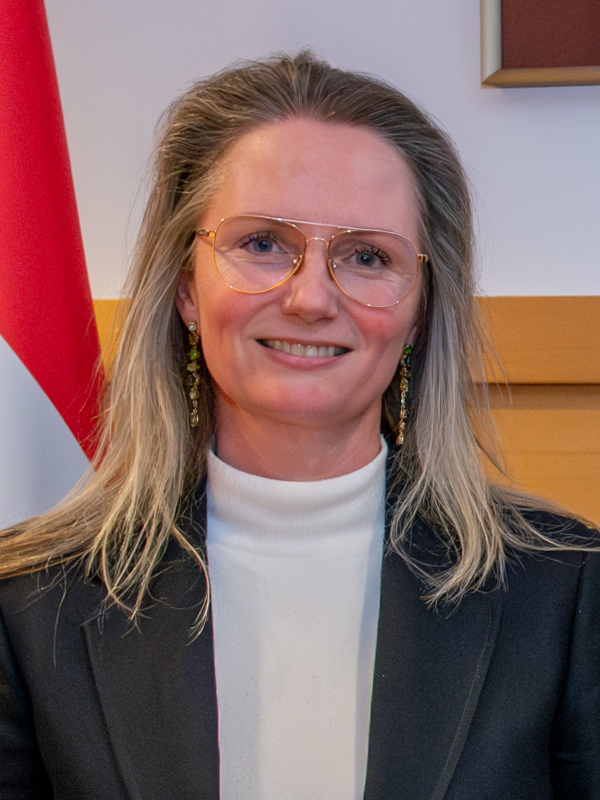
- Agema in February 2025

First Deputy Prime Minister of the Netherlands
- In office 2 July 2024 – 3 June 2025
- Prime Minister: Dick Schoof
- Preceded by: Rob Jetten
- Succeeded by: Sophie Hermans

Minister of Health, Welfare and Sport
- In office 2 July 2024 – 3 June 2025
- Prime Minister: Dick Schoof
- Preceded by: Conny Helder
- Succeeded by: Daniëlle Jansen

Member of the House of Representatives
- In office 30 November 2006 – 2 July 2024
- Succeeded by: Chris Faddegon

Member of the Provincial Council of North Holland
- In office 20 March 2003 – 14 March 2007

Personal details
- Born: Marie-Fleur Agema; 16 September 1976 (age 49) Purmerend, Netherlands
- Party: PVV (since 2006)
- Other political affiliations: LPF (2002–2004); Forza! (2004–2006)
- Domestic partner(s): Léon de Jong (2014–present)
- Children: 1
- Education: AKI ArtEZ University of the Arts (BA); Amsterdam University of the Arts (MA); Utrecht School of the Arts (MA)
- Website: (in Dutch) Party for Freedom website

Marie-Fleur Agema (Dutch: [maːriˈfløːr ˈaːɣəmaː]; born 16 September 1976) is a Dutch politician affiliated with the Party for Freedom (PVV). From 2 July 2024 to 3 June 2025, she served as first Deputy Prime Minister of the Netherlands and Minister of Health, Welfare and Sport in the Schoof cabinet. Agema previously served as a member of the House of Representatives from 30 November 2006 to 2 July 2024. She was considered a deputy to party leader Geert Wilders.

== Early life ==
Agema was born in Purmerend, North Holland, and grew up in Monnickendam and Wormerveer. Her parents ran a business in the hospitality industry. She obtained a BA degree from the AKI ArtEZ University of the Arts in 1999, an MA degree in Architecture from the Academy of Architecture of the Amsterdam University of the Arts in 2001, and an MA degree in Fine Art from the Utrecht School of the Arts in 2004. During her studies, she worked as a catering manager and also taught sailing lessons. From 1999 to 2003, she worked as a spatial designer and project leader for an architectural firm.

== Career ==
=== Provincial Council and House of Representatives ===
In March 2003, she was elected to the Provincial Council of North Holland, as a member of the Pim Fortuyn List (LPF). On 17 October 2003, she said had lost confidence in the governing board of the Pim Fortuyn List with two other State members of the LPF. In 2004, she left the party, because of dissatisfaction with the continuing internal dispute. She continued as a member of the provincial council as an independent. In 2004, she was a founding member of the Forza! Nederland party alongside former Pim Fortuyn List provincial council representative Paul Meijer, however she left shortly after its founding to join the Party for Freedom. In this same year, she was also noted as being active on the neo-Nazi internet forum Stormfront which uses the slogan "White Pride World Wide".

In 2006, she was asked by Geert Wilders, the party leader of the newly formed Party for Freedom, to join him on and get the second place on the list of candidates. In November 2006 she was chosen as a member of the Dutch House of Representatives. She left the provincial council on 14 March 2007. As an MP her main specialties are education, healthcare, spatial planning and infrastructure. She advocated to raise the minimum age for sex workers from 18 to 21, leading to the change being enacted. Agema received a sixth term in the 2023 general election, and her portfolio changed to disability care and elderly care. During her parliamentary career Agema was considered a prominent member of the party and a deputy to Geert Wilders who referred to her as his "star player."

Agema retired from politics ahead of the 2025 Dutch general election and did not seek another term in the House.

=== Minister of Health, Welfare and Sport ===
After the PVV, VVD, NSC, and BBB formed the Schoof cabinet, Agema was sworn in as First Deputy Prime Minister and as Minister of Health, Welfare and Sport on 2 July 2024. Departing from previous practice, Prime Minister Dick Schoof did not let Agema chair the weekly meeting of the Council of Ministers during his foreign trips, opting instead to move the date of the meeting. Agema chaired the meeting for the first time in February 2025, when Schoof was ill.

Responding to personnel shortages in the healthcare sector, Agema said that they could largely be resolved through new artificial intelligence technologies, and she indicated that she would introduce legislation to allow their usage. The governing agreement of the Schoof cabinet clarified it aims to halve time spent on administrative tasks by healthcare workers. It also included a reduction of the minimum health insurance deductible from €385 to €165 starting in 2027. Agema was tasked with extending the Integral Care Agreement, established in 2022 to maintain affordable and accessible healthcare for an ageing population. A revised agreement was planned for January 2024. However, municipalities pulled out of the agreement in November 2024, citing insufficient funding. When an alliance of coalition and opposition parties agreed two weeks later to cut the healthcare budget by an additional €315 million, five more professional and trade associations pulled out. Agema expressed concern over the cuts, particularly those affecting additional and refresher training for medical specialist care. The negotiating parties stated that it had not been their intention to affect training for nurses, and they called on Agema to find an alternative cut in the healthcare budget.

Agema advised against a motion to ban private equity firms from investing in the healthcare sector that received support from the PVV. She had been critical of the practice as a member of parliament, but she now said that legal hurdles existed and that such financing can be beneficial. The House of Representatives urged Agema to prevent the closure of the emergency department and intensive care unit at Heerlen's Zuyderland Hospital, but she was unsuccessful despite the coalition agreement's commitment to retaining local hospitals.

== Political profile ==
In her political career, Agema has primarily focused on the issue of care, particularly elderly care. She has argued for the preservation of nursing homes. Between 2010 and 2012, the PVV's voting behaviour on this issue more often followed the political line of the left-wing parties SP and GroenLinks than the centre-right parties VVD and CDA.

To outside observers, Agema has been described as belonging to the left wing of the PVV due to her support for welfare state policies. Following the founding of the PVV in 2008, she declared the party to have a "left-wing, warm profile" in the area of health care and as "strict, you could say right-wing" in the area of justice. She also cited British Prime Minister Margaret Thatcher as an influence. She has shared the anti-Islamic positions taken by the PVV and Pim Fortuyn, the leader of her old party the LPF, saying that she became critical of Islam in her youth partly through reading books such as The Satanic Verses by Salman Rushdie and learning about the fatwa declared on him.

== Personal life ==
In December 2012, Agema announced that she has been diagnosed with multiple sclerosis. Agema went on maternity leave on 13 January 2015 and was replaced by Karen Gerbrands. On 17 February 2015, she gave birth to a daughter with Léon de Jong.

Regarding her religious beliefs, Agema has described herself as "lightly religious" and "not religious, but also not non-religious."

== Electoral history ==
Electoral history of Fleur Agema
Year	Body	Party	Pos.	Votes	Result		Ref.
Year	Body	Party	Pos.	Votes	Party seats	Individual	Ref.
2006	House of Representatives	Party for Freedom	2	5,910	9	Won	
2010	House of Representatives	Party for Freedom	2	31,486	24	Won	
2012	House of Representatives	Party for Freedom	2	34,943	15	Won	
2017	House of Representatives	Party for Freedom	2	71,229	20	Won	
2021	House of Representatives	Party for Freedom	2	65,995	17	Won	
2023	House of Representatives	Party for Freedom	2	117,255	37	Won	

== Awards and honors ==
In 2011, Agema won the Angel of The Year award by PerspectieF, the youth-wing of the ChristenUnie.

In 2025, Agema was appointed a Knight in the Order of Orange-Nassau.

Political offices
Preceded by Conny Helder	Minister of Health, Welfare and Sport; 2024–2025	Succeeded by Eddy van Hijum
Preceded by Rob Jetten	First Deputy of the Prime Minister; 2024–2025; Served alongside: Sophie Hermans, Eddy van Hijum, and Mona Keijzer	Succeeded by Sophie Hermans
