= Party for the Netherlands =

Party for the Netherlands Partij voor Nederland
- Leader: Hilbrand Nawijn
- Chairman: Hilbrand Nawijn
- Founded: August 22, 2006
- Dissolved: Unknown
- Split from: LPF
- Preceded by: Nawijn Group
- Headquarters: The Hague
- Ideology: Fortuynism; Conservative liberalism
- Political position: Right-wing
- Colours: Orange; Blue

Party for the Netherlands (Dutch: Partij voor Nederland) (PVN) is a Dutch right-wing Fortuynist political party founded in August 2006 by Hilbrand Nawijn, a member of the Dutch House of Representatives.

The party was considered one of several splinter groups from the Pim Fortuyn List (LPF) party aiming to become the successor of the LPF. Its list for the 2006 election contained former LPF members such as former LPF leader Gerard van As, Paul Meijer and Willem van der Velden. Van As later split from Nawijn's party due to considering it to be too right-wing and withdrew from politics. After a dismal result of the party in the 2006 election, Hilbrand Nawijn stepped down from national politics. The future of the party itself is uncertain.
