= Richard J. Navin =

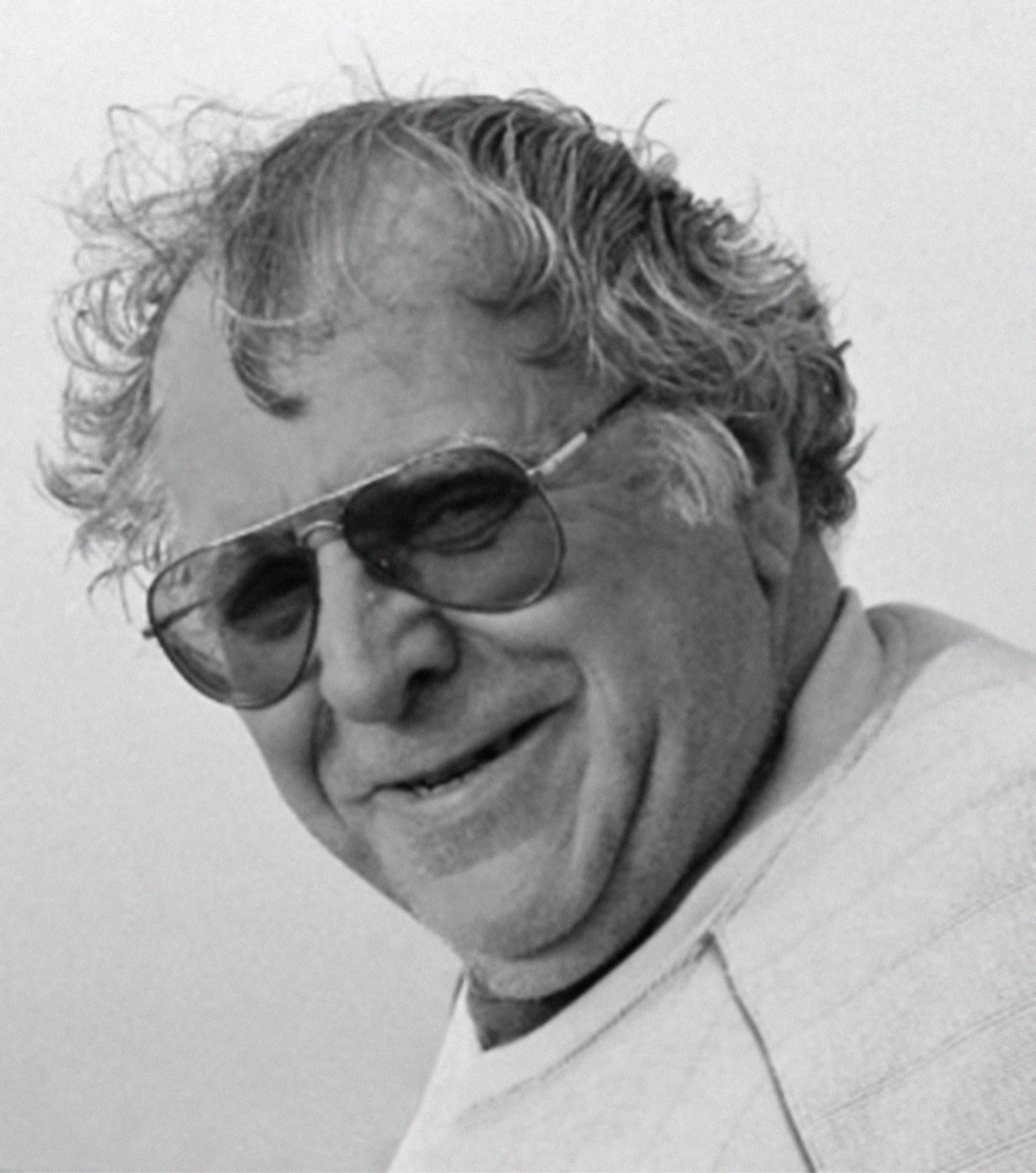
- Born: 1934; Chicago, Illinois
- Died: 2006 (aged 71–72)
- Notable work: the Myceanae Circle

Richard J. Navin (1934–2006) was a professor in the Art Department of various universities and was also an artist. He worked out of his art studio in Long Island City creating sculptures and creating translucent pieces. He is most famous for his sculpture, the Mycenae Circle which was on display at the Guggenheim Museum in New York City. He was well known for developing computer art programs to educate inner city children in Brooklyn.

== Early career ==
Richard J. Navin was born and raised in Chicago, Illinois. He attended college at Notre Dame and also graduated with an M.F.A in Design. At age 30 he moved from Chicago to New York City where he became a faculty member at St. John's University for 2 years, before moving to Brooklyn College. At Brooklyn College he received a tenured position in the Art Department where he remained a faculty member for over 30 years. He also lived in Kuesnacht, Zurich, for many years where he studied Jungian psychology and became a proponent of the Bauhaus theory of minimalist art design.

== Art career ==
In the 1970s Navin opened an art studio in Long Island City where he spent most of his time creating sculptures and pioneered the use of resins and lights to create translucent sculpture pieces. He is most famous for his sculpture, the Myceanae Circle which was on display at the Guggenheim Museum in New York City, on the first floor along with a number of additional sculptures. He published a book on his sculpture work which featured many photographs of the Myceanae Circle and his other pieces. Navin also exhibited his sculptures at the Whitney Museum, United Nations and many hospitals in the Greater New York area.

== Grants, awards and mentoring ==
Richard received many grants and awards for pioneering the use of computers in artwork and design. He set up the Digital Media Center, which was a computer lab that gave students of Brooklyn College access to high-end equipment and software to construct 3D imaging and video projects. Navin was well known for developing computer art programs to educate inner city children in Brooklyn. He frequently presented his work at the international computer meetings SIGGRAPH and Macworld, where he often gave lectures on education. He mentored many graduate students at Brooklyn College and was well known for his love of academia and education.
