= Hilbrand Nawijn =

Dutch lawyer and politician

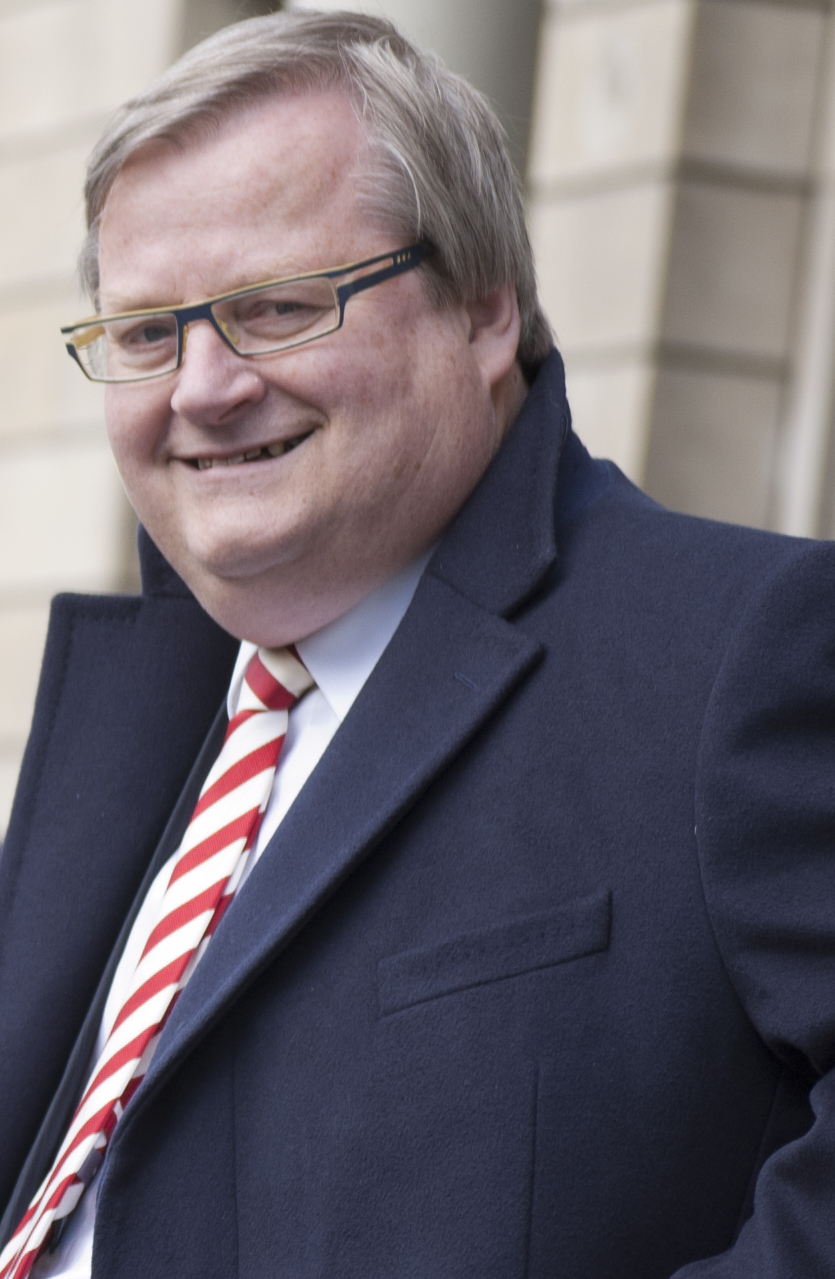
- Nawijn in 2012

Member of the House of Representatives
- In office 30 January 2003 – 30 November 2006

Minister for Integration and Asylum Affairs
- In office 22 July 2002 – 27 May 2003
- Prime Minister: Jan Peter Balkenende
- Preceded by: Office established
- Succeeded by: Rita Verdonk

Personal details
- Born: Hilbrand Pier Anne Nawijn; 8 August 1948 (age 78) Kampen, Netherlands
- Party: Lijst Hilbrand Nawijn (since 2006)
- Other political affiliations: Party for the Netherlands (2006–2008); Independent (2004–2006); Pim Fortuyn List (2002–2004); Christian Democratic Appeal (1980–2002); Anti-Revolutionary Party (before 1980)
- Education: University of Groningen (Bachelor of Laws, Master of Laws)
- Occupation: Politician · Civil servant · Jurist · Lawyer · Management consultant · Corporate director

Hilbrand Pier Anne Nawijn (born 8 August 1948) is a Dutch lawyer and politician of the local political party Lijst Hilbrand Nawijn (LHN) in Zoetermeer.

From 2002 to 2004, he served as a Member of the House of Representatives for the Pim Fortuyn List party and from 2006 for the Party for the Netherlands. Nawijn was Minister for Integration and Asylum Affairs in the first cabinet of Jan Peter Balkenende.

== Early life ==
Nawijn was born in Kampen. The son of a burgemeester (mayor), he is a descendant of Firmin Navin, a French Huguenot who had fled to Holland in 1696 to escape persecution. After graduating Emelwerda College in Emmeloord he studied law at the Rijksuniversiteit Groningen. He then worked for the Dutch Ministry of Justice and was a legal assistant at the main department of Constitutional and Criminal Law. He was also a legal advisor and later chairman of the Asylum Department at the Immigration and Naturalization Service which later became the Immigration and Naturalisation Service (IND) in 1996. After that, he worked in the private sector as a management consultant to Marezate BV and as a director for KPMG in The Hague. He later founded his own legal firm Nawijn lawyers in Zoetermeer.

== Political career ==
=== National politics ===
Following a long career working for the Dutch Ministry of Justice he was elected in 2002 as a member of the Christen-Democratisch Appèl for the municipal council of Zoetermeer. In 2002, Nawijn became an early supporter of the openly gay, populist Dutch politician Pim Fortuyn and was contacted by fellow former CDA member and Ministry of Justice employee Joost Eerdmans who encouraged Nawijn to lend support to Fortuyn's ambitions for parliament due to his legal experience. When Fortuyn founded the Pim Fortuyn List (LPF) Nawijn joined the LPF 24 hours after he had been elected as a councilor for the CDA and earned a place on the party's list for the 2002 Dutch general election. Nawijn's quick defection to the LPF caused some controversy and in a subsequent interview he maintained that the CDA and LPF were not too far apart ideologically and that he agreed with much of Fortuyn's political analysis.

Despite the assassination of Fortuyn by an animal rights activist, which happened days before the election, the LPF emerged with a successful result, thus bringing Nawijn into the Dutch House of Representatives. He was appointed Minister for Integration and Immigration in the first Balkenende cabinet. In government, Nawijn sought to drastically overhaul the immigration policy of the Netherlands. He proposed the One-off Regulation 2003 which would pardon existing asylum seekers who had been in the Netherlands for several years while freezing asylum intake and economic migration for a period and called for reforms to the 14-1 letter process by which grants residency to foreign nationals in difficult situations. He promised to grant residency to foreign nationals "in very exceptional cases" who had previously been denied residency. Future Immigration Minister Rita Verdonk would later adopt some curtailed versions of Nawijn's policy ideas.

Due to the instability of the LPF following Fortuyn's assassination, the first Balkenende cabinet lasted briefly, leading to early elections in 2003. Nawijn had been considered by the LPF as the Lijsttrekker or leader for the 2003 election, but due to his controversial conservative positions such as his support of the death penalty, which horrified many people in the Netherlands and was opposed by the LPF, he was placed at the bottom of the LPF's electoral list. This should have made it almost impossible for Nawijn to be reelected, however, the same statements which made him so unpopular to the political establishment won him a following among voters. On election day Nawijn received enough individual votes to once again enter the House of Representatives. Nawijn also voiced support for the reunification of Flanders and the Netherlands.

Despite still being a member of the LPF, Nawijn often was at odds with the party. In January 2005, he left the fragmented LPF with the goal of founding his own political party which conceptually would lean closer towards the ideas of the far-right Flemish party Vlaams Belang. Together with one of the leaders of Vlaams Belang, Filip Dewinter, in June 2005 he announced the founding of a think tank during a controversial meeting with Dewinter in the former house of murdered politician Pim Fortuyn. The think-tank was initially named the Marnix van St Aldegonde Foundation but the name could not be used due to a legal challenge by an existing organisation. The idea caused displeasure within the LPF. Marten Fortuyn, Pim Fortuyn's brother, called this action provocative, and "I had expected otherwise from Nawijn." The influential Dutch magazine Elsevier wrote: "According to (the LPF member of parliament) João Varela (politician), it was widely known that Pim Fortuyn wanted nothing to do with Dewinter, whose party Vlaams Blok (resurrected as Vlaams Belang) had the previous year been forbidden due to racism."

In August 2006, Nawijn announced the formation of the Party for the Netherlands to contest the 2006 Dutch general election. The party also recruited former LPF politicians Gerard van As, Paul Meijer and Willem van der Velden. According to Nawijn, the new party would follow the ideas of Pim Fortuyn, William of Orange and Desiderius Erasmus in its platform. However, the party won less than 1% of the vote and did not see any candidates elected. In the aftermath, Nawijn said he would retire from national politics.

=== Local politics ===
In the Dutch municipal elections of 2006, Nawijn managed, with his own new party, to gather 5 out of 39 seats in his hometown Zoetermeer. Later that year he entered the 2006 Dutch election with a new party, the Partij voor Nederland (Party for the Netherlands), but obtained no seats. During his campaign, Nawijn voiced his support for accepting CIA black sites into the Netherlands in an interview in October 2006 in the Dutch newspaper Spits.

== Later career ==
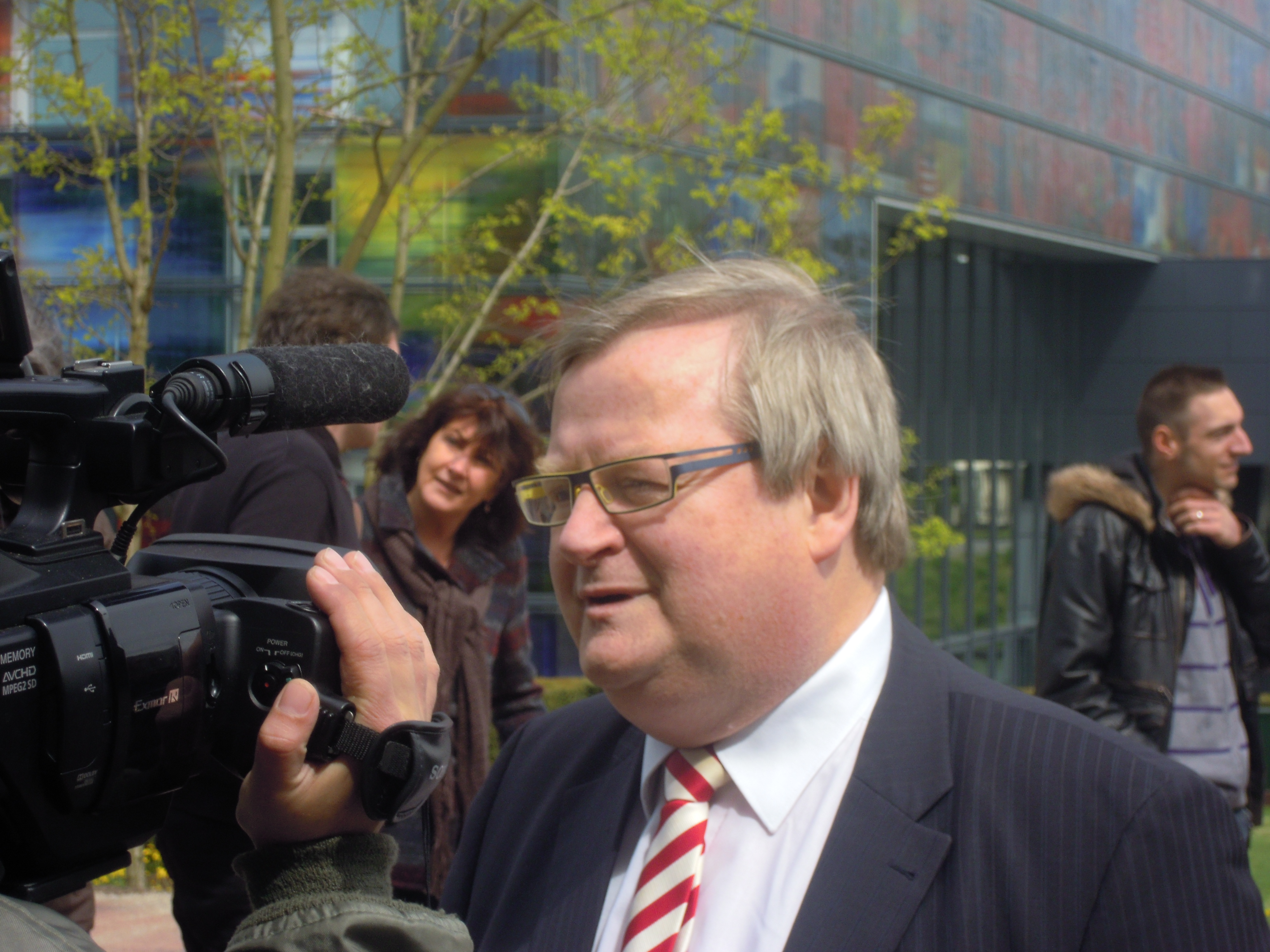
Nawijn attending the 10th anniversary commemoration of Pim Fortuyn's assassination in Hilversum in 2012

In early 2007, Nawijn participated in the Dutch version of So You Wanna Be a Popstar?, broadcast by the Dutch commercial TV channel SBS6, granting him fulfilment of one of his dreams. He stated that "Now that I have left national politics, I can do such things. An additional advantage is that it will keep me a bit 'in the picture'". As a result of his performances at the talent contest, which were met with public ridicule, Nawijn signed up for a five-year contract as a singer. His first single came out in May 2007, Hey Jumpen, in the jumpstyle genre, and reached #45 in the Dutch Single Top 100 charts.

In February 2008 he returned to his original career in law.

Since 2010, Nawijn has served as a councilor for his local political party Lijst Hilbrand Nawijn in Zoetermeer.

In 2028, Nawijn was giving an interview to Omroep WNL concerning anti-social behaviour in Zoetermeer when he and the reporter were attacked by a gang of youths before the police intervened.

Civic offices
Unknown	Director–General of the Immigration and Naturalisation Service; 1988–1994	Unknown
Political offices
Preceded by Office established	Minister for Integration and Asylum Affairs; 2002–2003	Succeeded by Rita Verdonk
