= Belang van Nederland =

Dutch political party

Interest of the Netherlands Belang van Nederland
- Abbreviation: BVNL
- Chairperson: Wybren van Haga
- Founders: Wybren van Haga; Olaf Ephraim; Hans Smolders
- Founded: 7 August 2021
- Split from: Forum for Democracy
- Headquarters: Palletweg 32, Haarlem
- Membership (2023): 6,305
- Ideology: Right-wing populism Conservative liberalism Classical liberalism Direct democracy Euroscepticism
- Political position: Right-wing to far-right
- Colours: Navy blue
- Senate: 0 / 75
- House of Representatives: 0 / 150
- European Parliament: 0 / 31
- Provincial councils: 0 / 570

Website
- bvnl.nl

Belang van Nederland (Dutch pronunciation: [bəˈlɑŋ vɑ ˈneːdərlɑnt]; lit. 'Interest of the Netherlands'; BVNL) is a political party in the Netherlands. Between 2021 and 2023, it was active in the House of Representatives as the independent Van Haga Group (Dutch: Groep Van Haga). Its three MPs had split from Forum for Democracy in August 2021.

== History ==
BVNL was founded by Wybren van Haga, who had previously been an MP for the People's Party for Freedom and Democracy (VVD) before defecting to Forum for Democracy (FvD). In May 2021, Van Haga announced that he split from FvD in response to a poster it had released which compared the COVID-19 lockdown to the Nazi occupation of the Netherlands. He was joined by two former FvD MPs Hans Smolders and Olaf Ephraim. The group subsequently founded the independent group Groep Van Haga. In August 2021, Van Haga announced his intention to start a new political party.

The party participated in the 2023 general election, but was unable to win a seat. Notable individuals on the party's candidate list were former 50PLUS politician Henk Krol and MMA fighter Alistair Overeem. The latter functioned as lijstduwer.

The party also contested the 2025 Dutch general election but also didn't secure any seats. Van Haga attributed the party's result to media exclusion and according to him BVNL "wasn't included in most voting guides and polls." After the election Van Haga stood down as party leader but said he would remain active in BVNL behind the scenes.

== Ideology ==
During its launch, Van Haga claimed that BVNL will be a classical liberal party and "culturally conservative, but classically liberal when it comes to the role of government". BVNL also said that individual liberty, freedom and the protection of Dutch history, cultural identity, and interests as the main cornerstones of its policies.

The party states that it supports technological advancement, a reformed criminal justice system, less state bureaucracy and simplified tax codes. On immigration, BVNL supports more border control measures, expulsion of foreign nationals with criminal records and opposes what it calls "the endless influx of asylum seekers" into the Netherlands, calling for an immediate halt to new asylum intake and withdrawal from the 1951 UN Refugee Convention. It also supports offering financial incentives to encourage remigration of those who are socially unintegrated or on unemployment benefits. BVNL also calls for an end to handing over Dutch sovereignty and political power to the European Union and supports a referendum on Dutch membership of the EU. The party also states that the Dutch constitution and laws must come ahead of international law and policies created by supranational bodies. Van Haga has described BVNL as less socially conservative on LGBT and gender issues than the FvD and JA21, which also split off from the FvD, and more focused on economic liberalism. The party also supports abortion and euthanasia under its current legislation.

== Election results ==
=== House of Representatives ===
Election	Lead candidate	List	Votes	%	Seats	+/–	Government
2023	Wybren van Haga	List	52,913	0.51	0 / 150	New	Extra-parliamentary
2025	Wybren van Haga	List	18,477	0.17	0 / 150	0	Extra-parliamentary

=== European Parliament ===
Election	List	Votes	%	Seats	+/–	EP Group
2024	List	23,032	0.37	0 / 31	New	–

== See also ==
- Otten Group
- VoorNederland
