= Wybren van Haga =

Dutch politician (born 1967)

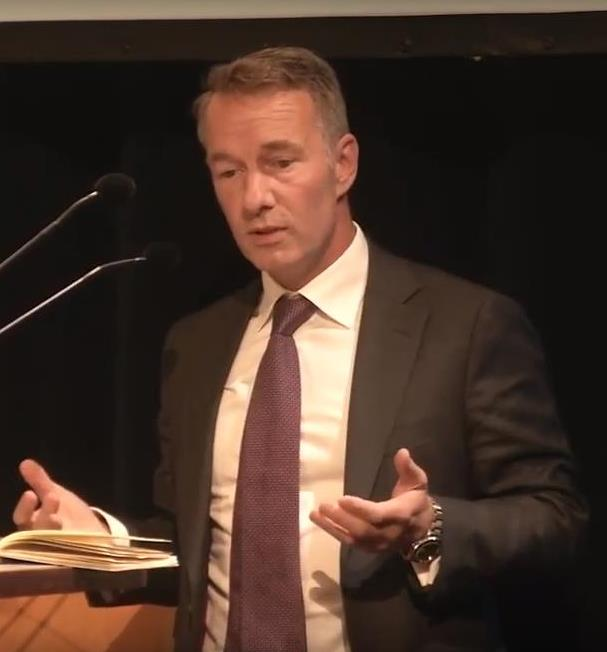
- Van Haga in 2019

Member of the House of Representatives
- In office 31 October 2017 – 5 December 2023

Personal details
- Born: Wybren Ridley van Haga; 31 January 1967 (age 59) The Hague, Netherlands
- Party: Belang van Nederland (since 2021)
- Other political affiliations: People's Party for Freedom and Democracy (1992–2019); Forum for Democracy (2020–2021); Independent (2019–2020, 2021)
- Education: Delft University of Technology
- Occupation: Politician; businessman
- Profession: Engineer

Wybren Ridley van Haga (born 31 January 1967) is a Dutch politician and engineer who was a member of the House of Representatives between 2017 and 2023. He was initially elected as a member of the People's Party for Freedom and Democracy (VVD), but was expelled from the party in 2019, causing the third Rutte cabinet to lose its parliamentary majority. Van Haga subsequently sat as an independent MP before joining Thierry Baudet's Forum for Democracy party, where he was placed second on the party list in the 2021 election. He has since quit Forum for Democracy and created his own political party Belang van Nederland.

== Early life, education and military service ==
Van Haga was born in 1967 in The Hague and grew up in Haarlem. His father is Dutch and his mother was originally from Britain. He completed the gymnasium with the natural sciences specialization. He studied electrical engineering at the Delft University of Technology. He also completed the first phase of a law study at Leiden University. He served his mandatory military service as a commando.

== Business career ==
He subsequently worked as an engineer for the Shell Oil Company, and was based variously in Scotland, Gabon and Oman before starting a property development business.

== Political career ==
Van Haga first joined the VVD in 1992. In 2010, he was elected as a municipal councilor in Haarlem. During the 2017 general election, he was elected as an MP for the VVD in the House of Representatives. During the election, his candidacy was endorsed by Labour Party politician and former mayor of Haarlem Bernt Schneiders.

In 2017, Van Haga was investigated over an alleged concealment of a number of problems with local regulations during his time as a councilor. In 2019, he was expelled from the VVD parliamentary group after he was convicted for drunk driving and accused of interfering with his business operation as an MP. This caused the third Rutte cabinet to lose their parliamentary majority. Van Haga subsequently sat as an independent before announcing he had become a member of the Forum for Democracy party. Van Haga already had close ties with the FvD group as an independent.

Van Haga left FvD together with two others in response to a poster put out by the party which compared the COVID-19 lockdowns to the Nazi occupation of the Netherlands. He has since created his own political party called Belang van Nederland (BVNL). The new party had three seats in the House of Representatives. (Note: Formally, the parliamentary group was known as Group Van Haga (Dutch: Groep Van Haga)) Van Haga has described it as 'classical liberal' and 'classical right-wing'. He ran for re-election in November 2023, but BVNL did not win any seats. He again led his party in the June 2024 European Parliament election, but the BVNL's vote share of 0.4% was insufficient for a seat.

== Personal life ==
Van Haga is married and has four children.

== Electoral history ==
Electoral history of Wybren van Haga
Year	Body	Party	Pos.	Votes	Result		Ref.
Year	Body	Party	Pos.	Votes	Party seats	Individual	Ref.
2010	Haarlem Municipal Council	VVD		113	5	Lost (Note: Van Haga was appointed to the body later during the term due to a vacancy.)	
2014	Haarlem Municipal Council	VVD			5	Won	
2017	House of Representatives	VVD	41	2,156	33	Lost	
2018	Haarlem Municipal Council	VVD	15	127	5	Lost	
2021	House of Representatives	FVD	2	241,193	8	Won	
2022	Haarlem Municipal Council	BVNL	16 (Note: Van Haga participated as lijstduwer.)	400	1	Lost	
2022	Amsterdam Municipal Council	BVNL	12	463	0	Lost	
2022	Voorne aan Zee Municipal Council	BVNL	11	171	2	Lost	
2023	House of Representatives	BVNL	1	37,472	0	Lost	
2024	European Parliament	BVNL	1	19,502	0	Lost	
2025	House of Representatives	BVNL	1	12,967	0	Lost	
