= Smartvote =

smartvote is a Swiss voting advice application (VAA) similar to VoteMatch in the Netherlands or Wahl-o-Mat in Germany. In Switzerland, smartvote has been offering its services since 2003, and since 2005 it has been operated in collaboration with local partners in other countries (e.g. Bulgaria, Luxembourg, Austria).

== How it works ==
smartvote is an online platform, which matches voters to candidates and/or parties that share their policy positions. A voter creates a political profile by filling out a standardised questionnaire with between 30-75 questions on current policy issues. This profile is then matched with the previously gathered profiles of the candidates running and the parties. In contrast to other online voting aids, the candidates answer the smartvote questionnaire themselves. Upon completion of the questionnaire, the voter is presented with a list of candidates or parties (lists) that are sorted into descending order in accordance with the extent of their matching with the voter's profile. The Euclidean distance serves as the matching algorithm between the profiles of the voters and those of the candidates or parties. The methodological principles behind the calculations for the conformity ratings and for the graphical evaluations are made transparent on the smartvote website.

== Development ==
smartvote was first developed for the 2003 Swiss parliamentary elections and it was immediately used by a wide section of the public. Since 2004, smartvote has also been offering its services for cantonal and communal elections. By 2018, smartvote had been used for over 200 elections in Switzerland alone. Although smartvote was initially met with some scepticism from Swiss politicians, the profiles of most Swiss members of parliament can now be found on smartvote. The 2007 Swiss parliamentary elections established smartvote as the most important reference source to the Swiss public for establishing the political positions of incumbents and of aspiring candidates. During the 2011 Swiss parliamentary elections and 2015 Swiss parliamentary elections, about 85% of the candidates running for office created a smartvote profile. For each national election the voters made use of smartvote some 1.2 million times (not an indication of the number of users, as a single individual can engage in multiple usage). On the basis of the results of the official Swiss Election Study, some 15% of the voters in 2011 appeared to have used smartvote as an aid in decision making. In the period from 2005 to 2013, research was conducted into smartvote and its respective use both by candidates standing and by voters, as part of a project undertaken by the National Center of Competence in Research "Challenges to Democracy in the 21st Century" at the University of Bern and the University of Lausanne.

== Project organization and development ==
The development of smartvote began in 2001 as a private project with the objective of equipping the electorate with transparent and independent information. The first publicly visible version was produced in 2003 in close collaboration with a private web agency. Since January 2004, smartvote has been operated by Politools (Politools – Political Research Network) – a registered society based in Bern, being neutral in its politics and having no allegiance to a particular religious denomination, in the sense of Article 60 et sqq. of the Swiss Civil Code.

smartvote was developed with reference to the specific characteristics of the Swiss electoral system. It therefore differs, above all, in the following respects, when compared to other online voting aids:

- As the Swiss election system shows a strong orientation towards candidates (open lists), smartvote also places the focus on the comparison of voter-to-candidate, while in other countries online voting aids mostly concentrate on the comparison of voter-to-party.
- With its 75 questions, the smartvote questionnaire is significantly longer than for other comparable tools. This is also a consequence of the electoral system, because comparisons must on occasions be enabled for more than 800 candidates per Swiss electoral district.
- In Switzerland it is far from being the case that all parties stand for election in all electoral districts, so smartvote offers the comparison specifically for each district. This means that voters can compare themselves with parties or with candidates which are actually standing for election in a particular electoral district.
- In addition to the comparison in the form of a ranking, smartvote also places particular importance on the visualisation of the comparisons of the positions, e.g. by means of profile graphics for eight political theme areas (so-called smartspider profiles) or by locating the positions on a two-dimensional political map.

== Literature ==
- Garzia, Diego and Stefan Marschall (Hrsg.), 2014. "Matching Voters with Parties and Candidates: Voting Advice Applications in a Comparative Perspective." ECPR Press, Colchester.
- Ladner, Andreas and Jan Fivaz, 2012. „Voting Advice Applications.“ In: Kersting, Norbert (eds): Electronic Democracy. Barbara Budrichs Publisher, Opladen: 177-198.
- Thurman, James and Urs Gasser, 2009. „Three Case Studies from Switzerland: Smartvote.“ Berkman Center Research Publication No. 2009-03.3.
