= Political ideologies in the United States =

Ideologies and ideological demographics in the United States

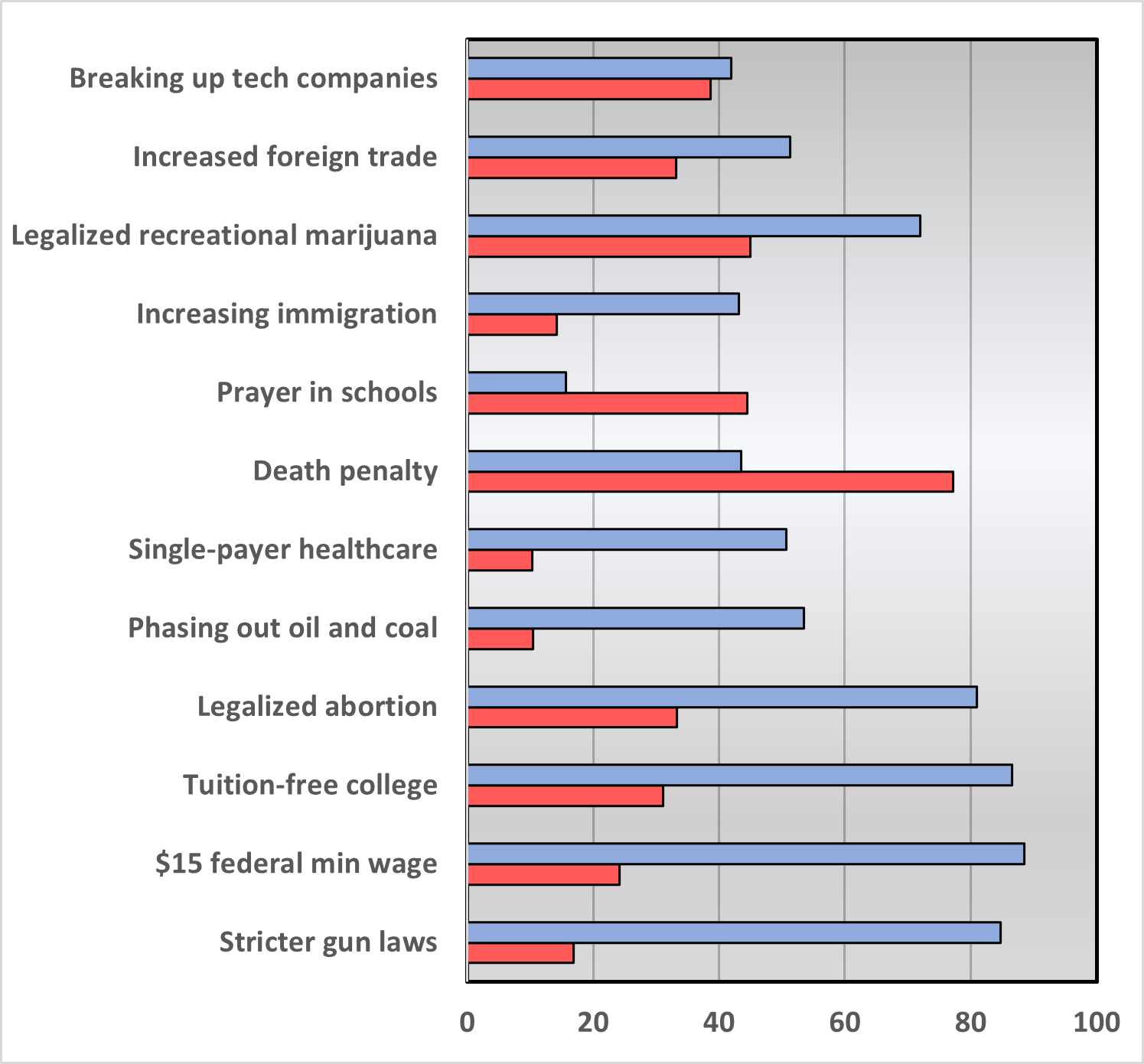
Percentage of liberals (blue) and conservatives (red) in favor of major political proposals in the United States (Pew Research Center, 2021)

American political ideologies conventionally align with the left–right political spectrum, with most Americans identifying as conservative, liberal, or moderate. Contemporary American conservatism includes social conservatism and fiscal conservatism. The former ideology developed as a response to communism and then the civil rights movement, while the latter developed as a response to the New Deal. Modern American liberalism includes cultural liberalism, social liberalism and progressivism, developing during the Progressive Era and the Great Depression. Besides conservatism and liberalism, the United States has a notable libertarian movement, developing during the mid-20th century as a revival of classical liberalism. Historical political movements in the United States have been shaped by ideologies as varied as republicanism, populism, separatism, fascism, socialism, monarchism, and nationalism.

Political ideology in the United States began with the country's formation during the American Revolution, when republicanism challenged the preexisting monarchism that had defined the colonial governments. After the formation of an independent federal government, republicanism split into new ideologies, including classical republicanism, Jeffersonian democracy, and Jacksonian democracy. In the years preceding the American Civil War, abolitionism and secessionism became prominent. Progressivism developed at the beginning of the 20th century, evolving into modern liberalism over the following decades, while modern conservatism developed in response. The Cold War popularized anti-communism and neoconservatism among conservatives, while the civil rights movement popularized support for racial justice among liberals. Populist movements grew in the early-21st century, including progressivism and Trumpism.

Americans of different demographic groups are likely to hold different political beliefs. Men, White Americans, the elderly, Christians, and those without college degrees are more likely to be conservative, while women, African Americans, non-Christians, and people with college degrees are more likely to be liberal. Conservatism and liberalism in the United States are different from conservatism and liberalism in other parts of the world, and ideology in the United States is defined by individualism rather than collectivism.

== History ==
=== Early republicanism ===
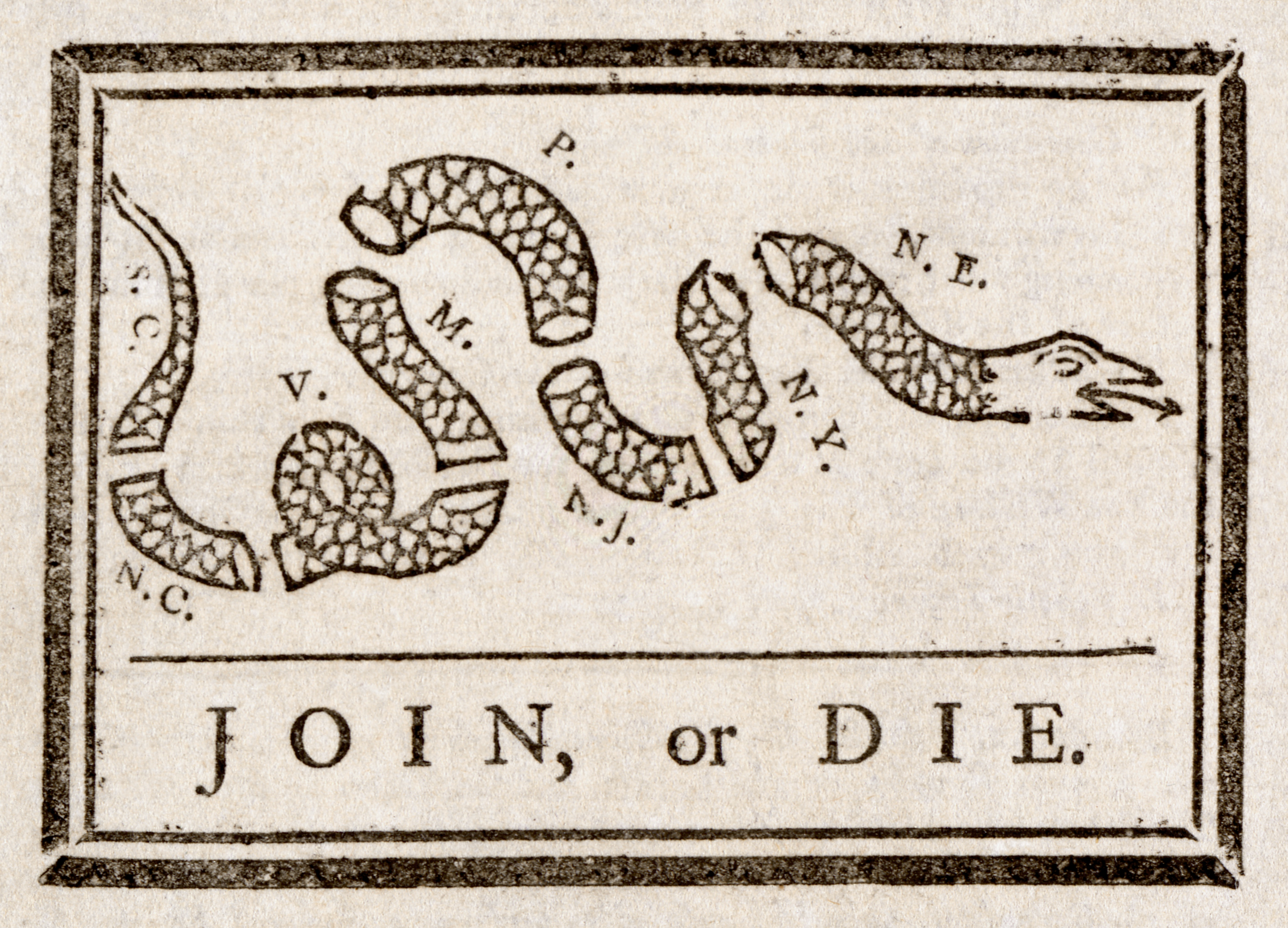
Join, or Die (1754). This political cartoon by Benjamin Franklin advocated unity of the Thirteen Colonies.

Political ideology in the United States first developed during the American Revolution as a dispute between monarchism and republicanism. Republican ideas developed gradually over the 18th century and challenged monarchism directly through the Declaration of Independence in 1776. The monarchists, known as Loyalists, advocated that the Thirteen Colonies retain their colonial status under the monarchy of Great Britain, while the republicans, known as Patriots, advocated independence from Great Britain and the establishment of a liberal government based on popular sovereignty with no king and no inherited aristocracy. Instead, republicans advocated an elite based on achievement, and that elite had a duty to provide leadership. Patriot victory made republicanism into the foundational ideology of the United States.

Advocates of republicanism at the time emphasized the importance of Enlightenment values (such as civic virtue and benevolence) to republican ideology and their vision of society involved a select group of elites that represented the people and served in government. The Constitution of the United States was ratified in 1789 to establish republicanism as the governmental system of the United States, introducing traditions such as separation of powers and federalism to the country. Early American republicanism was the first major liberal ideology in the United States, and it became the foundation for both modern conservatism and modern liberalism.

As the federal government evolved in the 1790s, the classical republican ideals of civic virtue and aristocracy were challenged by more liberal ideas of democracy and self-interest. The Federalist Party was founded by Alexander Hamilton to support political candidates that advocated classical republicanism, stronger federal government, and the American School of economics, while the Democratic-Republican Party was founded by Thomas Jefferson to support political candidates that advocated the agrarian and Anti-Federalist ideals of Jeffersonian democracy. The Federalists saw most of their support in New England, with the other states supporting the Democratic-Republicans. The influence of Federalists declined during the 1800s, and Jeffersonian democracy came to be the only major ideology during the Era of Good Feelings.

The Democratic-Republican Party fractured in the 1820s as a result of the political rivalry between John Quincy Adams and Andrew Jackson. Jackson established his ideology of Jacksonian democracy, and the Democratic Party was created to support Jackson. Much like Jefferson, Jackson supported popular democracy, rule by the people over elites, and minimal government intervention in the economy; however, the Democratic Party was not a direct successor to the Democratic-Republican Party, and they differed in other areas. Unlike Jefferson, Jackson's Democrats advocated political patronage and a stronger executive branch. The National Republican Party was created to oppose Jackson, advocating economic interventionism and opposing unrestrained individualism. Anti-Masonry also saw prominence at this time, and the National Republican Party merged with the Anti-Masonic Party in 1833 to form the Whig Party. The Whig Party and the Democratic Party became the two major parties. The Whigs advocated for the American System, which consisted of protectionism through tariffs, a national bank, and internal improvements.

=== Slavery and Civil War ===
Union states (blue) and Confederate states (red) in 1864. Light blue denotes Union slave states. Gray denotes territories.

Slavery had been present in North America since colonial times, but it did not become a major political issue in the United States until the 1830s. National political ideology was not as influential during this period, with sectional politics between the northern and southern states driving political activity. All of the northern states had abolished slavery by 1805, but it was still widely practiced in the southern states until the Civil War (1861–1865). Abolitionism had been present in the United States since the country's foundation, but this period of sectionalism brought it into the mainstream, and by the 1840s slavery had become the nation's primary political issue.

The Republican Party was formed after the collapse of the Whig Party in the 1850s to reflect the political ideologies of the northern states. It immediately replaced the Whig Party as a major political party, supporting social mobility, egalitarianism, and limitations on slavery. The two major political factions of the Republican Party were the Radical Republicans, who supported total abolition of slavery and strong action against the secessionist states, and the moderates, who supported concessions with the southern states. At the same time, some nationalist Americans advocated expansionism and manifest destiny, seeking to acquire additional territory. Many of these individuals wished for additional territory to create additional slave states.

Secessionism became prominent in South Carolina during the Nullification crisis in 1832. Secessionists opposed the protectionist tariffs of 1828 and 1832, threatening to secede if the federal government attempted to enforce them. Secession and military conflict were averted by a compromise tariff in 1833. The secessionist movement in South Carolina grew more popular in the 1850s as the issue of slavery became more contentious. In 1861, fearing that the federal government would restrict or abolish slavery, South Carolina was the first of 11 states to secede from the United States and form the Confederate States of America, prompting the Civil War. Democrats in the northern states were split between the War Democrats that supported military action to prevent secession and the Copperheads that opposed military action.

During the Reconstruction era from 1865 to 1877, politics focused on resolving the issues of the Civil War. The ratification of the Thirteenth Amendment abolished slavery in the United States, and ideologies based on the issue of slavery were made irrelevant. The Radical Republicans supported liberal reforms during Reconstruction to advance the rights of African Americans, including suffrage and education for freedmen. White supremacy was a major ideology in the southern states, and restrictions on the rights of African Americans saw widespread support in the region, often enforced through both political and violent means. The conservative Bourbon Democrats were prominent in the south during this period, supporting fiscal conservatism and classical liberalism, and setting the foundation for the period of conservative Democratic control in the region known as Solid South.

=== Gilded Age ===
The Gilded Age took place between the 1870s and 1890. During this time, the Republican Party fractured on the issue of the spoils system in the federal government. Senator Roscoe Conkling led the conservative Stalwarts, who supported the traditional political machine and wished to retain the spoils system. Those that opposed Conkling, especially supporters of Senator James G. Blaine, made up the liberal Half-Breeds, who supported civil service reform to abolish the spoils system. The Stalwarts primarily resided in the three states most influenced by machine politics: New York, Pennsylvania, and Illinois. They were also prevalent among southern Republicans, though the Solid South was overwhelmingly Democratic.

The Democratic Party continued to be divided by sectional politics during the Gilded Age. Ideologies based on monetary issues produced conflict within both major parties. Silverites opposed the nation's de facto gold standard and supported a return to bimetallism. Small government ideals were still prominent at this time, with neither major party seeking to expand the government. By the 1870s, both major political parties supported industrialization, and in response, supporters of populist agrarianism established the People's Party in 1892. The Panic of 1893 accelerated these disputes, causing a major party realignment. The People's Party was absorbed by the Democratic Party, and the conservative Bourbon Democrats lost influence. Populism, agrarianism, and bimetallism became the dominant ideologies in the Democratic Party, led by William Jennings Bryan.

Other major ideological groups during the Gilded Age include the Mugwumps, the Greenbacks, and the Prohibitionists. The Mugwumps were a loosely formed collection of anti-corruption conservatives that left the Republican Party. The Greenbacks were the largest of a series of labor related movements that advocated an increased money supply, increased government regulation, and an income tax. The Prohibitionists were a single-issue group that advocated prohibition of alcohol.

=== Progressive Era ===
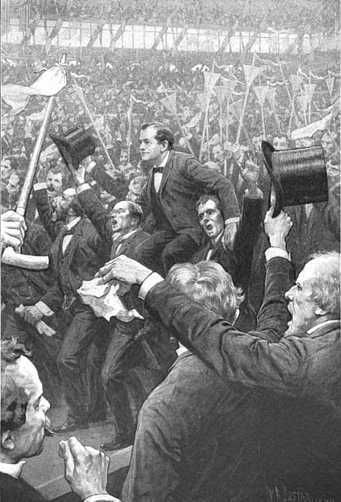
Depiction of William Jennings Bryan after giving the Cross of Gold speech in 1896 (William Robinson Leigh, 1900)

In the 1890s and 1900s, progressivism developed as a major political ideology in the United States. Progressives opposed the effects of industrialization in the United States, supporting major governmental and societal reform to counteract them. These reforms were inspired by the moral ethos of evangelicalism and the development of the social sciences. Progressives sought to end corruption, increase public participation in government, and expand government with the goal of improving society. The progressive movement resulted in the rejection of laissez-faire capitalism in the United States and the foundation of welfare capitalism.

Progressives came from multiple political traditions and developed many new political ideas. Progressives typically supported direct democracy and oversaw several reforms that gave more voting power to the citizens. These reforms included the implementation of primary elections to choose party candidates and the direct election of senators through the ratification of the Seventeenth Amendment. Regarding social issues, progressives typically believed that the government was best fit to make decisions about behavior through social control. The most prominent example of this was the prohibition on alcohol in the 1920s. Progressives also advocated for compulsory sterilization of those deemed "unfit". Progressives in the early-20th century raised first-wave feminism and women's suffrage into the mainstream, guaranteeing universal suffrage to all women through the ratification of the Nineteenth Amendment.

The Democrats during the Progressive Era moved away from the conservative, small government ideology under which they had operated in the late-19th century. The Democratic Party at this time did not advocate a single ideological system but was composed of several competing populist factions that opposed the Republican Party. The Democrats adopted a reformed view of democracy in which political candidates sought support directly rather than through intermediaries such as political machines. Many progressive reforms became popular within the Democratic Party to increase direct democracy and give citizens more power over government operations, and they also adopted the idea of the Living Constitution during this period. During the presidency of Woodrow Wilson, Wilsonianism was developed as a liberal internationalist foreign relations ideology.

Republicans during the Progressive Era were divided between a conservative faction and a progressive faction. Theodore Roosevelt split from the Republican Party in 1912, and his supporters formed the short-lived Progressive Party. This party advocated a strong collectivist government and a large number of social and political reforms. Far-left ideologies also saw brief popularity during this time. The Socialist Party of America was led by Eugene V. Debs and advocated for collective ownership of many industries. The anarchist movement in the United States was responsible for several terrorist attacks during the 1910s. The first Red Scare, a strong backlash to these leftist movements, formed in 1919.

=== New Deal coalition ===
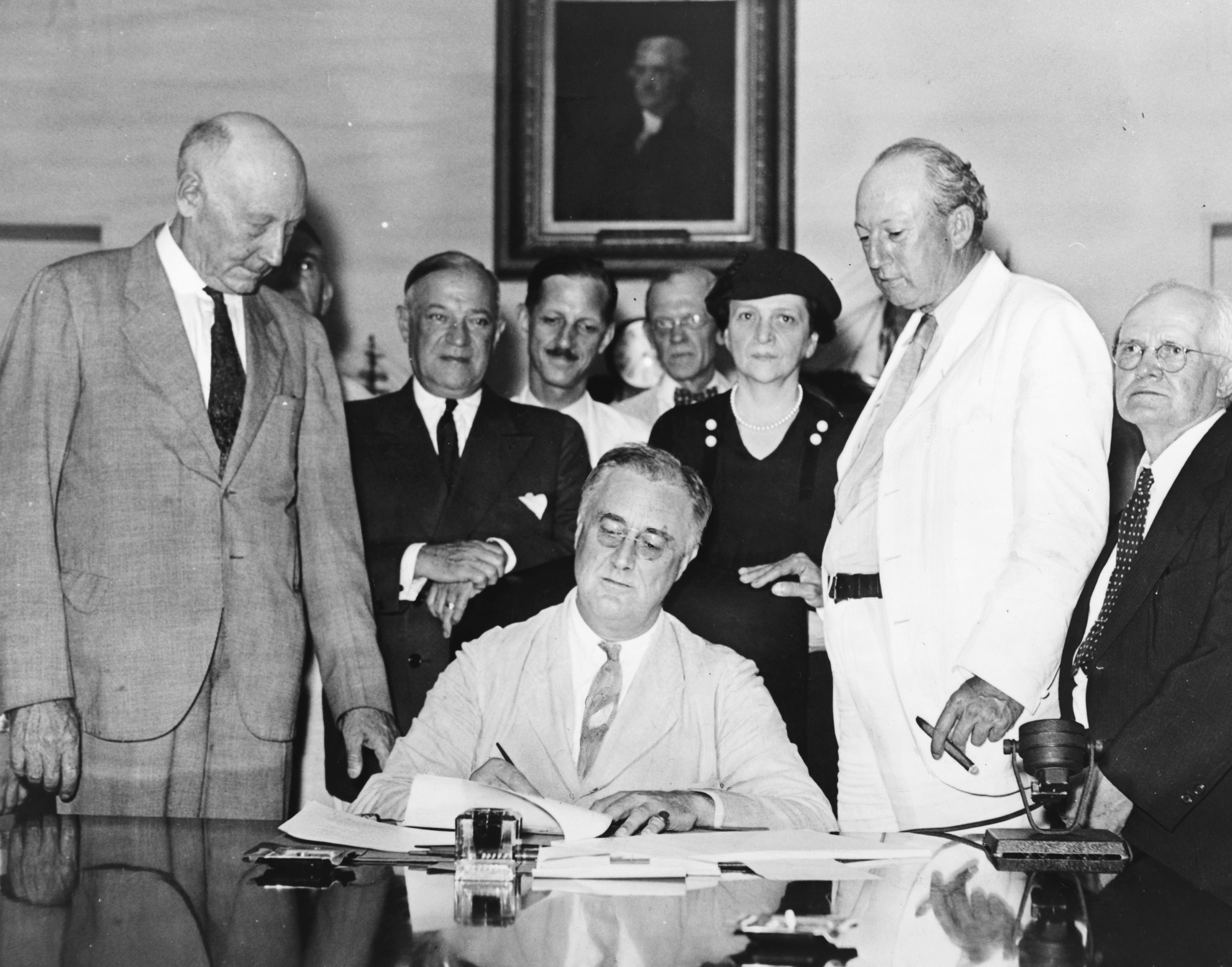
President Roosevelt signing the Social Security Act in 1935

During the Great Depression, small government conservatism became less popular, and Franklin D. Roosevelt formed the New Deal coalition. The Democratic Party at this time expanded on the reformist beliefs of progressivism, establishing social liberalism and welfare capitalism as the predominant liberal ideology in the United States. Supporters of Roosevelt's liberalism advocated financial reform, increased government regulation, and social welfare programs, encapsulated in the New Deal. Conservative Republicans and southern conservative Democrats formed the conservative coalition during Roosevelt's second term. Following the presidencies of Roosevelt and Truman, the Democratic Party moved away from populism in the 1950s. American liberalism also shifted its perspective on poverty during this time, emphasizing it as a long term social issue rather than a crisis that could be fixed with a sufficient response.

The Republican Party's progressive wing had dissipated in the build up to the Great Depression. The party instead began to advocate for small business, equal opportunity, and individualism. These ideas became the foundation of modern fiscal conservatism that would define the Republican Party through the 20th century. The foundations of modern social conservatism were also developed by the Republican Party of the 1920s and 1930s, with Herbert Hoover emphasizing politics as a means to protect the American family and American morality. Rather than strengthening of government to do good as advocated by progressivism, conservative Republicans sought to restrict the government to prevent harm. The Republican Party came out strongly against the New Deal programs of the 1930s, arguing that "big government" threatened to become tyrannical.

American entry into World War II was debated between isolationists and interventionists from the onset of conflict in the European theatre in 1939 until the attack on Pearl Harbor in 1941. During the war, an ideology of self-sacrifice was promoted and adopted by the American people, including both military service and home front activities such as rationing. After the end of the war, interventionism persisted through programs such as the Marshall Plan. Fascism briefly saw popularity in the 1930s, though it was no longer relevant after World War II.

=== Cold War and Civil Rights Era ===
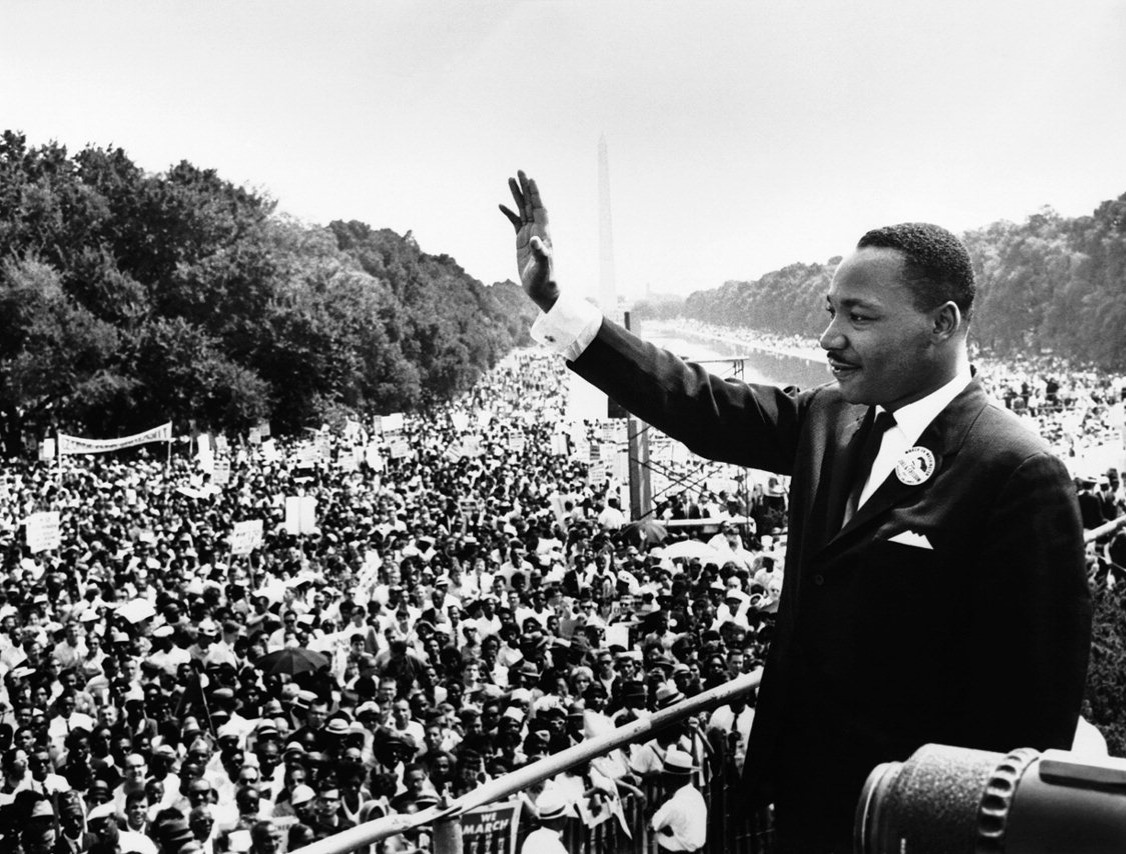
Martin Luther King Jr. at the March on Washington for Jobs and Freedom in 1963

The Cold War began in 1947, causing a shift in foreign policy. Americanism developed as its own distinct conservative ideology that rejected foreign ideas and communism in particular. The United States as a whole supported liberal democracy and capitalism in contrast with Marxism–Leninism, which was supported by the Soviet Union. Anti-communism was prevalent in the United States during the Cold War, while American communist organizations typically operated in secret and often conducted espionage in collaboration with the Soviet Union. Among conservatives, this anti-communism overlapped with anti-liberalism as McCarthyism, in which all political opponents of conservatives were accused of communist sympathies. Neoconservatism also developed within the conservative movement, made up of former Democrats that were disillusioned with the party's liberalism. The Vietnam War took place during the Cold War, causing a significant anti-war movement within the contemporary counterculture. Both the anti-war movement and the war itself were unpopular with the public. Modern libertarianism developed as a minor ideology in the 1960s, and the Libertarian Party was founded in 1971 after the gold standard was abolished by President Nixon.

In the 1960s, national politics focused heavily on the civil rights movement, and the New Deal coalition ended as support for civil rights and racial justice became major aspects of liberalism in the United States. Civil rights legislation such as the Civil Rights Act of 1964 alienated the conservative Southern Democrats. White supremacy was widespread in the southern United States, with third-party white supremacist candidates winning in southern states in the 1948 and 1968 presidential elections. Political ideology evolved significantly in the African American community during the civil rights movement as the community developed its own political voice. The two most prominent civil rights ideologies were the liberal ideology of racial integration through political demonstration championed by Martin Luther King Jr. and the separatist ideology of Black nationalism championed by Malcolm X. Other civil rights ideologies included liberal ideas of incentivizing integration through private action, socialist ideas of forgoing race issues in favor of class issues, and Black conservative ideas of personal responsibility for African Americans. Conservatives opposed government intervention designed to increase employment for African Americans and opposed extending civil rights protections, believing that these policies would hurt African Americans economically and would make the United States a liberal welfare state.

=== Reagan Era ===
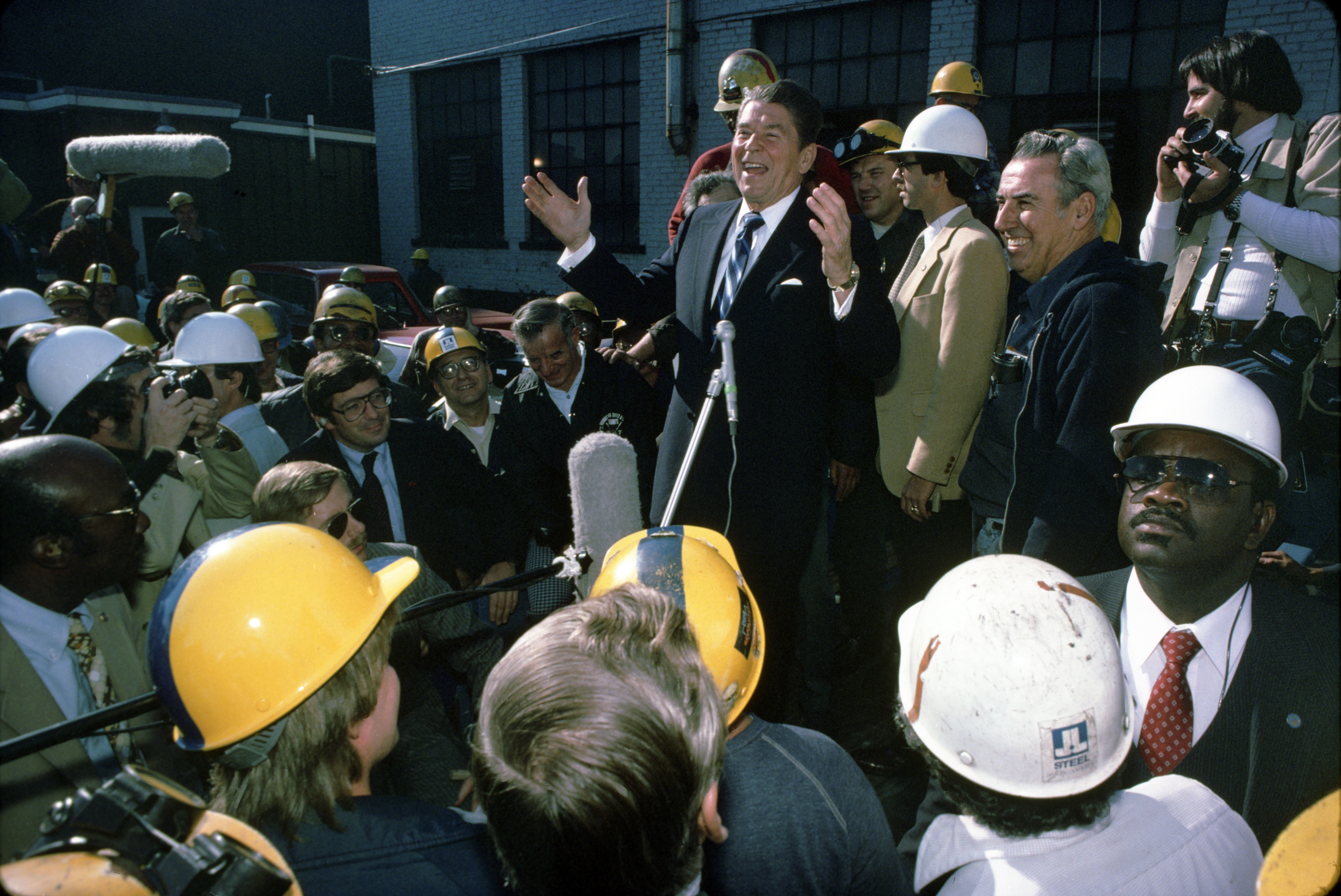
Ronald Reagan campaigning for the 1980 presidential election

Though conservatives opposed welfare spending during the New Deal era, this opposition did not become a core tenet of American conservatism until the 1970s. Southern conservatives were united under the Republican Party at this time through the Southern strategy. Conservatism had been seen as a dying ideology following the defeat of Barry Goldwater in the 1964 presidential election, but the Reagan administration in the 1980s returned American conservatism to the political mainstream. The Reagan coalition brought together, businessmen, conservatives, neoconservatives, libertarians, and the religious new right, including Christian fundamentalists, Evangelicals, Catholics and Jews. They rejected the leftward shift of the country in the previous decades, instead advocating laissez-faire economics and traditional values while opposing communism. Social conservatism became a prominent ideology in politics during the Reagan Era, fueled by opposition to abortion. The Tuesday Group was founded in 1995 to represent the moderate wing of the Republican Party in Congress.

Liberals in the 1970s and 1980s expanded their focus on inclusivity and minority rights. In the 1990s, support for conservative policies resulted in Third Way politics to become popular in the Democratic Party, led by the New Democrats. This ideology consisted of support for free trade, free markets, and reduction of government spending. The left-wing Congressional Progressive Caucus, the centrist and conservative Blue Dog Coalition, and the Third Way New Democrat Coalition formed in the 1990s to represent different factions of the Democratic Party in Congress.

=== 21st century ===
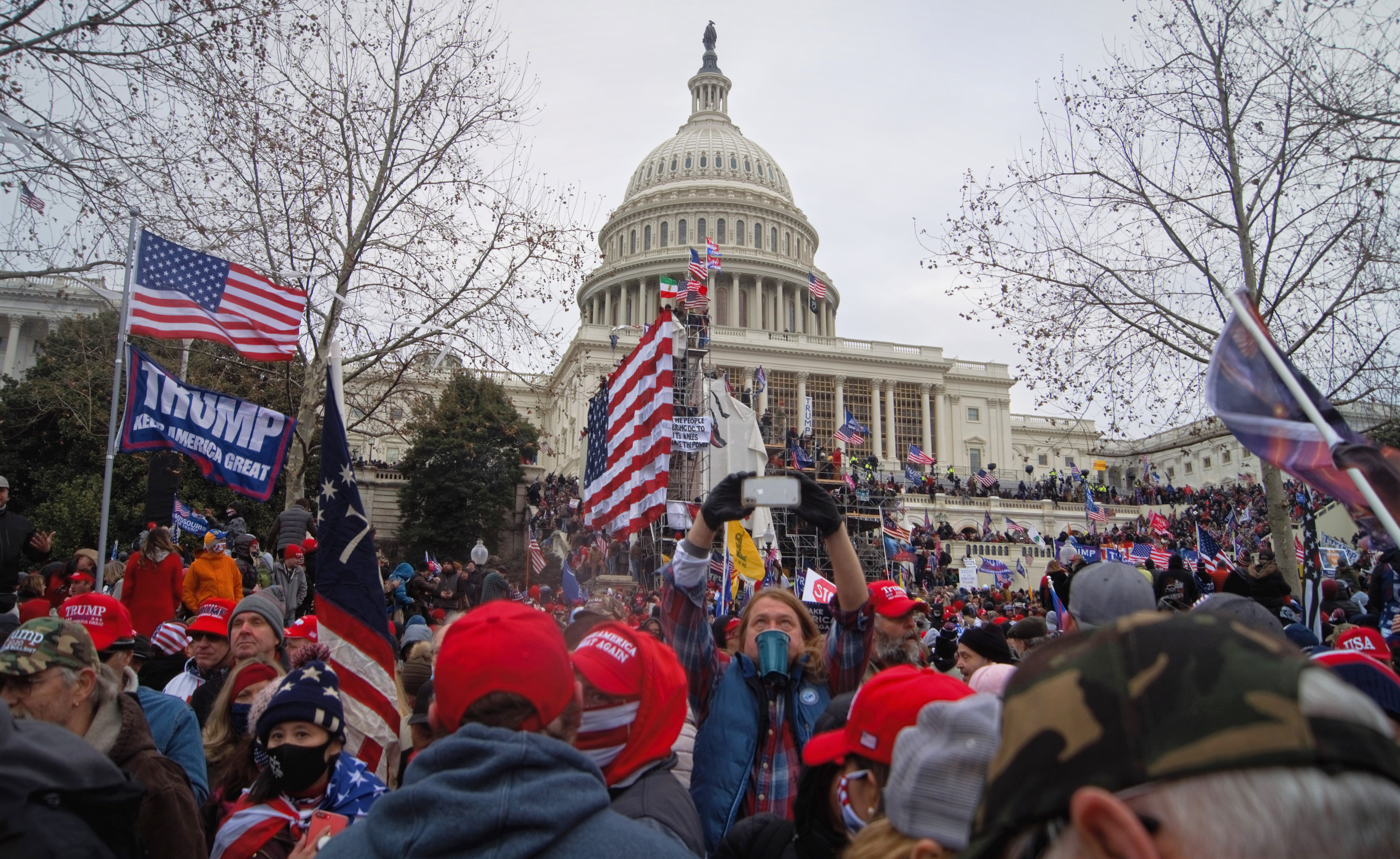
Pro-Trump rioters during the January 6 United States Capitol attack in 2021

After the September 11 attacks, neoconservatism became a dominant force in the conservative movement, and conservatives supported the Bush Doctrine, a foreign policy principle that encouraged foreign military involvement as the Bush administration pursued the war on terror. The peace movement subsequently resurged in the United States in response to the War in Afghanistan and the Iraq War. In the years following the September 11 attacks, a distinct form of patriotism developed based on American values, democracy promotion, and nationality derived from principle. Following the end of the Cold War, the focus of American anti-communism shifted to China as it became a world power.

The early-21st century saw the emergence or reemergence of several social issues as subjects of political debate. Liberals increasingly expressed support for LGBT rights (including same-sex marriage) while conservatives predominantly expressed opposition to LGBT rights. Among young single women, the percentage of them identifying as liberal increased from about 15 percent in the early 1980s to 32 percent in the 2020s. The past decade has seen single young men move slightly to the right and single young women move significantly to the left, meaning that the ideological divide between the sexes is widening. Illegal immigration became more prominent as a political issue, with liberals advocating pluralism and conservatives advocating nativism. The COVID-19 pandemic in 2020 became a political issue in which liberals supported COVID-19 lockdowns and the use of face masks while conservatives opposed such measures and considered the pandemic a non-issue.

The 2010s were marked by increasing polarization and populism among candidates and voters. The Tea Party movement formed as a libertarian, right-wing populist and conservative response to the election of Barack Obama in 2008. Members of the movement advocated for smaller government, lower taxes, and decreased government spending. This populism in turn led to Trumpism following the election of Donald Trump in 2016. Right-wing populism during this period focused on protectionist fiscal conservatism as well as cultural issues surrounding immigration and identity politics. Trumpism incorporated an opposition to democratic norms, as well as an acceptance of political conspiracy theories as mainstream ideas. Left-wing populism became more influential during the 2010s, beginning with the Occupy movement in 2011. Left-wing populist ideologies popularized in the 2010s include social democracy and democratic socialism due to the popularity of politicians such as Bernie Sanders.

== Prominent ideologies ==
Political ideology in the United States is usually described with the left–right spectrum. Liberalism is the predominant left-leaning ideology and conservatism is the predominant right-leaning ideology. Those who hold beliefs between liberalism and conservatism or a mix of beliefs on this scale are called moderates. Within this system, there are different ways to divide these ideologies even further and determine one's ideology. Ideological positions can be divided into social issues and economic issues, and the positions a person holds on social or economic policy might be different than their position on the political spectrum. The United States has a de facto two-party system. The political parties are flexible and have undergone several ideological shifts over time. Since the mid-20th century, the Democratic Party has typically supported liberal policies and the Republican Party has typically supported conservative policies. Third parties play a minor role in American politics, and members of third parties rarely hold office at the federal level. Instead, ideas with popular support are often adopted by one of the two major parties.

=== Conservatism ===
Ronald Reagan

Modern conservatism in the United States traces its origins to the small government principles of the Republican Party in the 1920s, and it developed through opposition to communism, the New Deal coalition and the civil rights movement in the mid-20th century. The rise of the Reagan coalition led to the election of Ronald Reagan in 1980, establishing conservatism as a major ideology in the United States. This coalition advocated laissez-faire economics, social conservatism, and anti-communism, with support from libertarians, northern businessmen, southern segregationists, and the Christian right. In the early 21st century, right-wing populism and neo-nationalism gained considerable influence among the conservative movement. Right-wing populism became the predominant conservative faction in response to the increasing liberalization of society, beginning with the Tea Party movement of 2009 and continuing with the first presidency of Donald Trump.

There are several different schools of thought within American conservatism. Social conservatives and the Christian right advocate traditional values, decentralization, and religious law, fearing that the United States is undergoing moral decline. Fiscal conservatives (or classical liberals) advocate small government, tax cuts, and lower government spending. Americans that identify as conservative will typically support most or all of these ideas to some extent, arguing that small government and traditional values are closely linked. American right-wing populists advocate tax cuts, protectionism, and opposition to immigration, framing politics as a battle against "elites" from above and "subversives" from below.

Conservatism in the United States does not advocate a unified foreign policy ideology, though common tenets include support for American hegemony, promotion of free markets abroad, and combat readiness. Realism was prominent in conservative foreign policy during the mid-20th century, advocating cautious advances in influence through diplomacy to advance American interests. Support for realism fell among conservatives during the Reagan administration in favor of American exceptionalism and more aggressive anti-communism. Neoconservatives form an interventionist wing of the conservative movement, advocating peace through strength and the use of force to promote democracy and combat threats abroad. Other conservative ideologies support isolationism and limited involvement in foreign affairs.

As of 2021, over one-third of the American public self-identifies as conservative. The Republican Party represents conservatives in the United States, with 74% of Republicans identifying as conservative, compared to only 12% of Democrats. As of 2022, Republican leaning voters are more likely than Democrats to prioritize the issues of immigration, the budget deficit, and strengthening the military. A Pew Research study in 2015 found that the most reliable Republican demographics were Mormons and Evangelicals, particularly white Americans in each group.

=== Liberalism ===
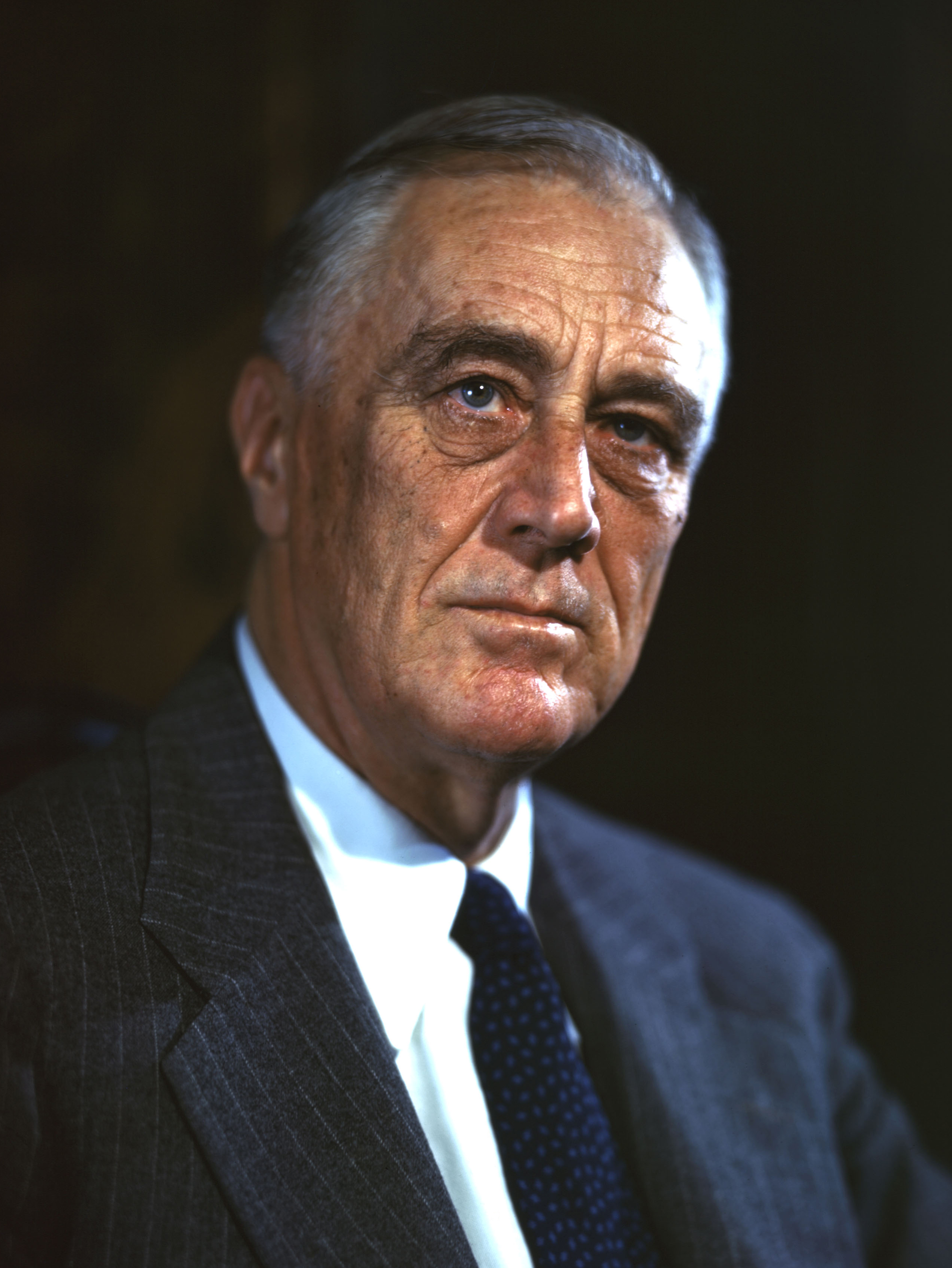
Franklin D. Roosevelt

Modern liberalism in the United States originates from the reforms advocated by the progressive movement of the early 20th century. Franklin D. Roosevelt implemented the New Deal in response to the Great Depression, and the New Deal programs defined social liberalism in the United States, establishing it as a major ideology. In the 1960s, it expanded to include support for the civil rights movement. Following the rise of the Reagan coalition in the 1980s and the shift toward conservatism in the United States, American liberals adopted Third Way liberalism. A movement of left-wing populism emerged within liberalism following the Great Recession and Occupy Wall Street.

Liberalism in the United States is founded on support for strong civil liberties, cultural liberalism, and cultural pluralism. Liberal social beliefs include support for more government intervention to fight poverty and other social issues through programs such as welfare and a social safety net, as well as opposition to government intervention in moral and social behavior. Liberal economic beliefs include support for a mixed economy that uses a capitalist system maintained with economic interventionism and regulation, as well as opposition to both laissez-faire capitalism and socialism as means to distribute economic resources. Keynesian economics commonly factor into liberal economic policy. Those that identify as liberal will typically support liberal economic policies as a means to support liberal social policies. Liberals within the modern progressive movement support greater redistribution of wealth, increases to the federal minimum wage, a mandatory single-payer healthcare system, and environmental justice.

Liberal internationalism is a key component of American foreign policy, supporting increased involvement in the affairs of other countries to promote liberalism and seek liberal peace. This ideology was first developed in the United States as Wilsonianism during World War I, replacing the expansionism of the Roosevelt Corollary. Liberal internationalism has been the dominant foreign policy ideology of the United States since the 1950s. Realism grew in popularity among liberals in the early-21st century in response to the interventionist neoconservatism of the Bush administration. Progressive Americans support pacifism and antihegemonism in foreign policy.

As of 2021, about one quarter of the American public self-identifies as liberal, making it the smallest of the mainstream ideological groups. The Democratic Party represents liberals in the United States, with 50% of Democrats identifying as liberal, compared to only 4% of Republicans. As of 2022, Democratic leaning voters are more likely than Republicans to prioritize the issues of the COVID-19 pandemic, climate change, race, and poverty. A Pew Research study in 2015 found that the most reliable Democratic demographics were African Americans, atheists, and Asian Americans.

=== Moderates ===
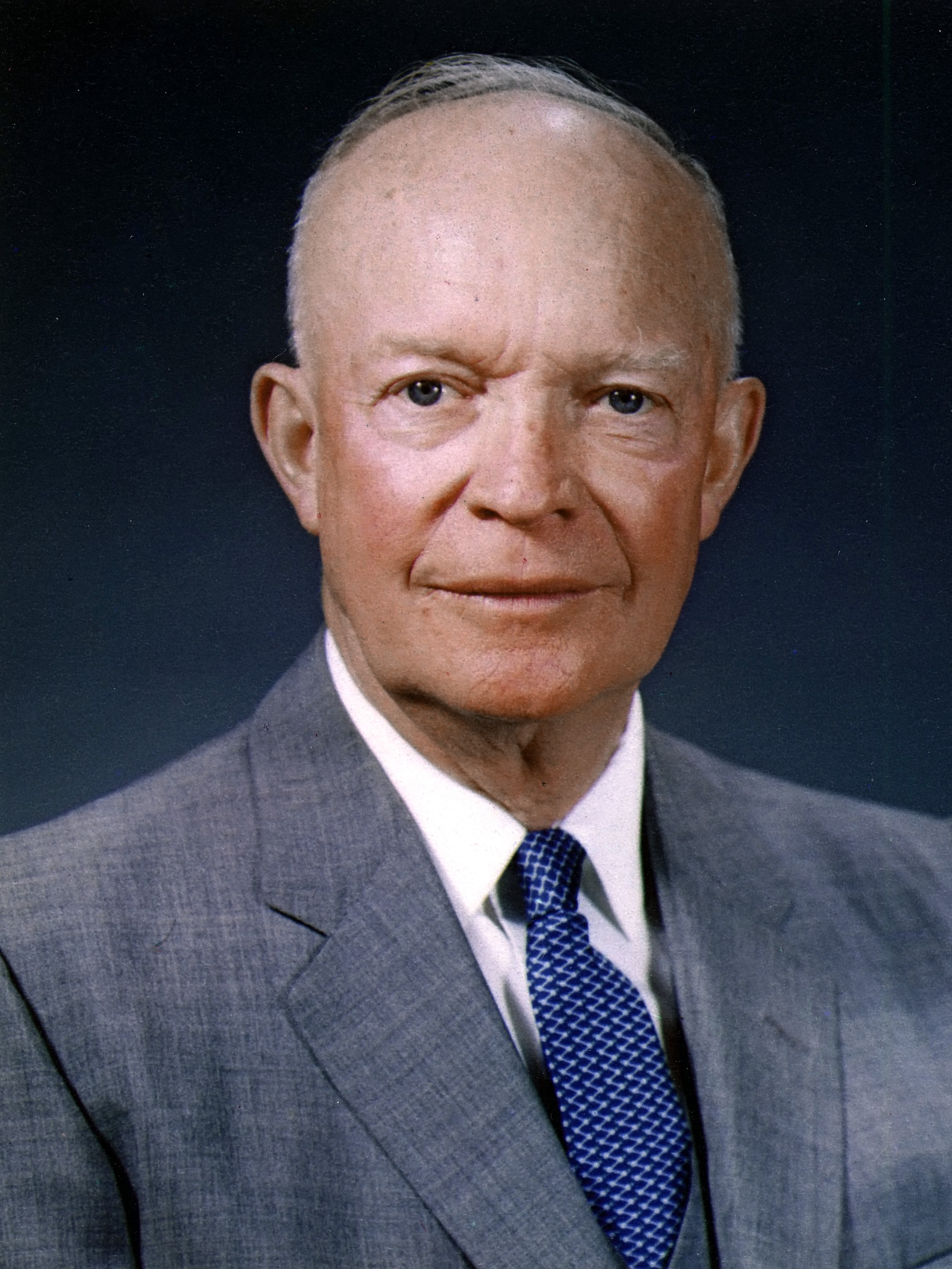
Dwight D. Eisenhower

Moderates prioritize compromise and pragmatism, and moderate politics vary depending on the political circumstances of the era. During the American Revolution, moderates generally supported the ideas of the revolutionary Patriots, but they were concerned about the potential consequences of open revolution. During the Civil War, southern moderates opposed secession, while northern moderates advocated a more gradual response to slavery than the total abolitionism and enforcement of civil rights proposed by Radical Republicans. During Reconstruction, moderate Republicans sought to increase support for civil rights in the South instead of implementing them through force. In the 1950s, Dwight D. Eisenhower operated under his policy of "Modern Republicanism" that promoted moderate politics in response to the New Deal coalition and the conservative coalition.

Moderates identify as neither liberal nor conservative, holding a mix of beliefs that does not necessarily correspond to either group. They typically believe that issues are too complex for simple partisan solutions to work and that the two major political parties are too ideological. Some policy stances have strong support from moderates, including background checks on gun purchases and investing in renewable energy. Beyond a resistance to the terms liberal and conservative, there is little that unites moderates ideologically, and moderates can hold a variety of political positions. As of 2021, over one-third of the American public self-identifies as moderate. Self-identified moderates make up about one-third of the Democratic Party, about one-fifth of the Republican Party, and about half of independents.

== Minor ideologies ==
=== Fascism ===
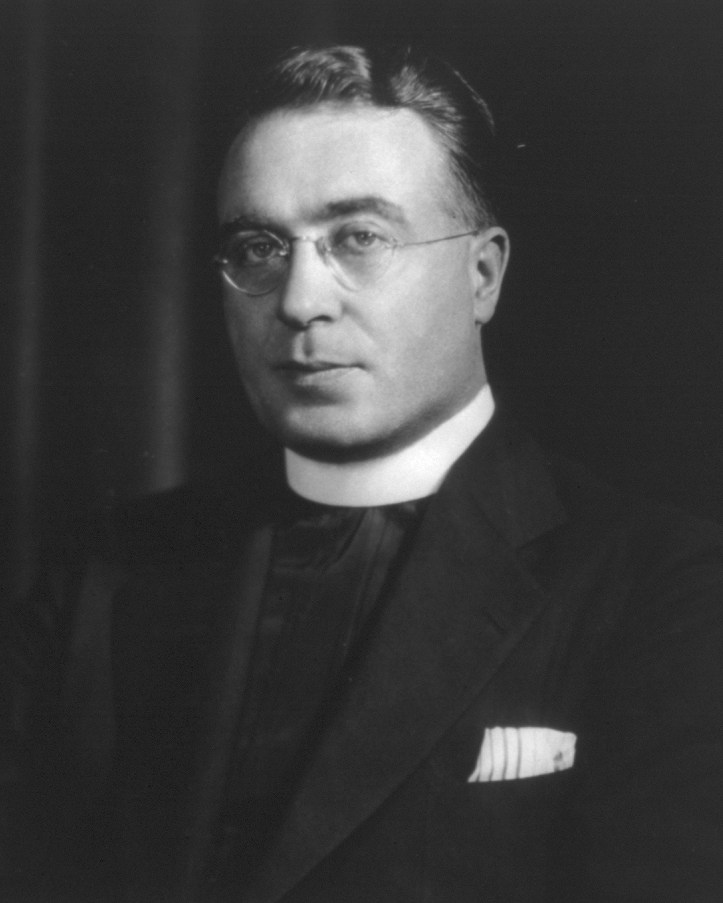
Charles Coughlin

Fascism never achieved success in American politics. There were nonetheless prominent American supporters of fascism in the 1930s, including Henry Ford. Charles Coughlin, at one point the second most popular radio host in the United States, openly advocated fascist ideals during his program. A minority of Americans at the time were also sympathetic to fascism because of its antisemitism, its anti-communism, and what was perceived as its economic success. Antisemitism in the United States was common at the time, and many antisemitic groups openly expressed these views.

The Friends of New Germany and its successor the German American Bund represented the largest Nazi organizations in the United States, which is estimated to have had 25,000 members. Present-day Nazism is called neo-Nazism. Many factors have been proposed that cause someone to radicalize and adopt Nazism, including a traumatic past, a search for meaning through extremism, and a propensity to violence or aggression. A 2017 poll found that 9% of Americans believe neo-Nazi beliefs are "acceptable". The Federal Bureau of Investigation recognized neo-Nazis as a major domestic terror threat in 2020. The terms "fascist" and "Nazi" are sometimes used erroneously as epithets to describe political figures and ideologies, but these uses of the terms are generally disputed by academics that study the subject. The mid-2010s saw the brief rise in the alt-right movement, which was characterized by its sympathy to fascist ideologies and opposition to multiracial liberal democracy.

=== Libertarianism ===
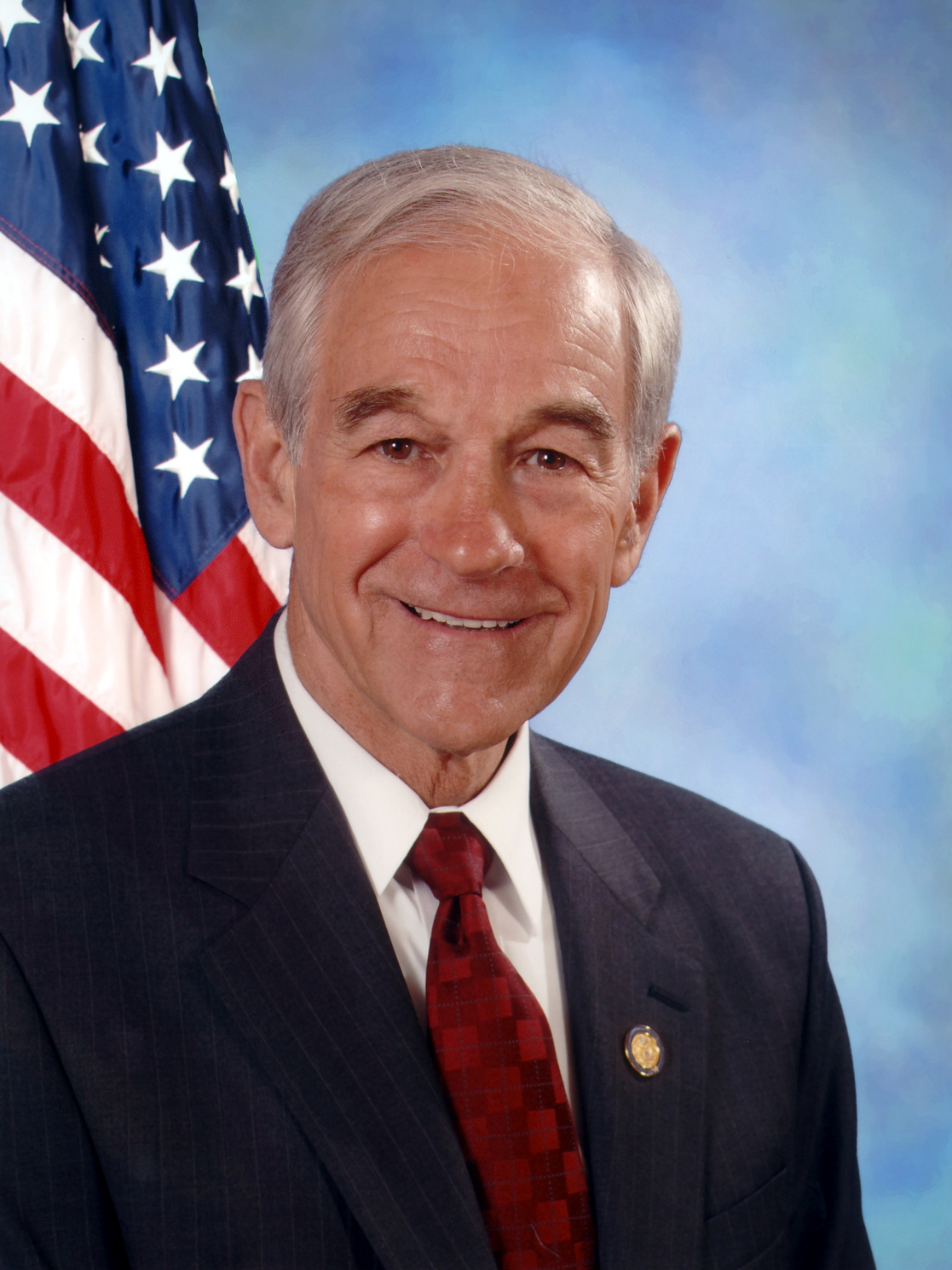
Ron Paul

Developed in the mid-20th century as a revival of classical liberalism, libertarianism in the United States (dominantly right-libertarianism) is founded on the ideas of severely limited government, with supporters of libertarianism advocating fiscal conservatism and reduction of social programs, social liberalism, and isolationist foreign policy. Libertarians make up a notable minority group in American politics, with about 11% of Americans saying that the term describes them well as of 2014. Men were twice as likely to identify with the term as women, and Democrats were half as likely to identify with the term as Republicans or independents. As of 2013, 68% of libertarians were men, 94% of libertarians were white, and 62% of libertarians were under the age of 50. Religiously, 50% of libertarians were Protestant, 27% were religiously unaffiliated, and 11% were Catholic.

Libertarianism is promoted by the Libertarian Party, the largest minor party in the United States. Libertarians in the United States typically vote for the Republican Party, with only a small portion voting for the Democratic Party or the Libertarian Party. Some major think tanks in the United States operate from a libertarian perspective, including the Cato Institute and the Reason Foundation. Some libertarians have begun voting for the Democratic Party since 2020 in response to the rise of right-wing populism in the Republican Party.

=== Monarchism ===
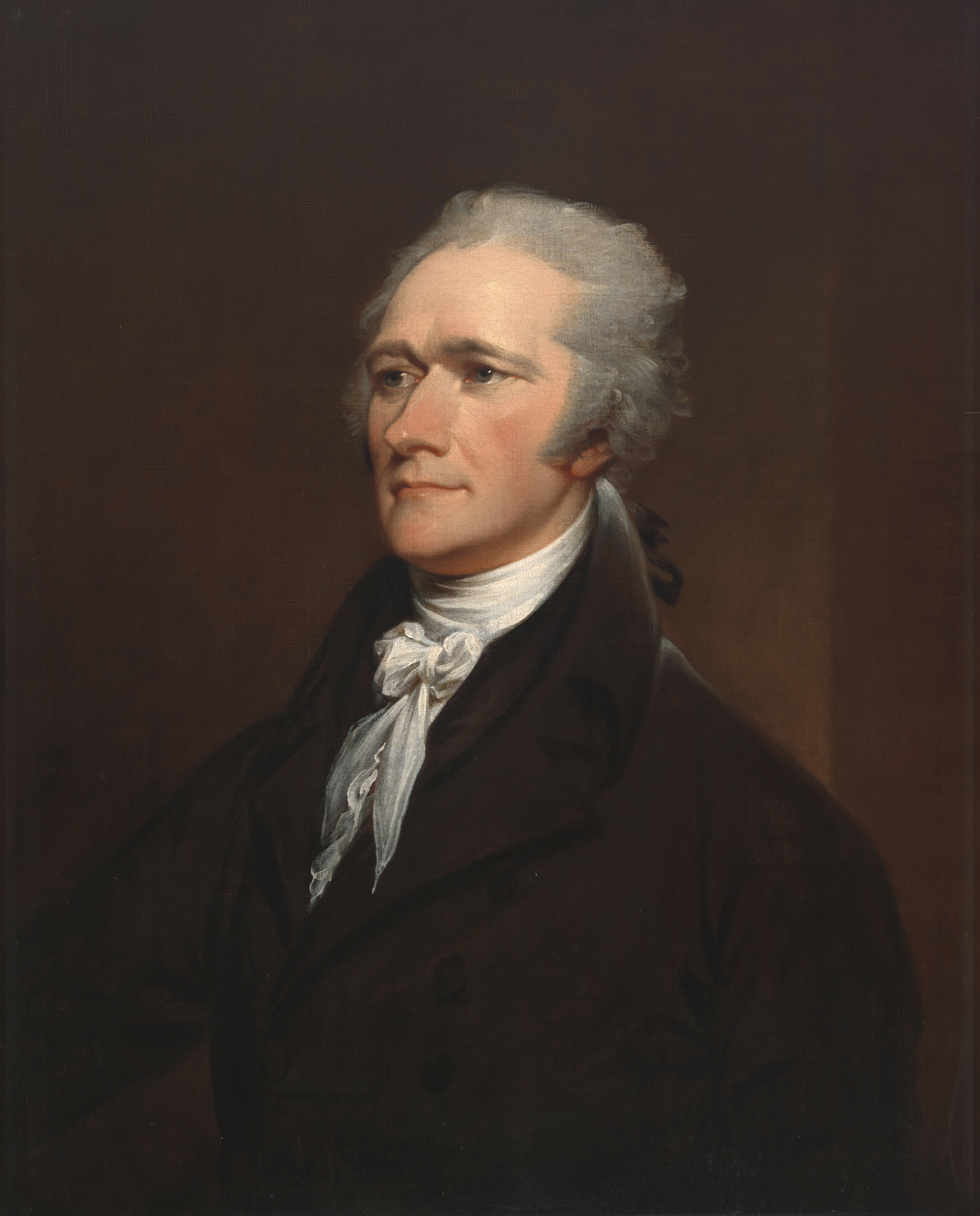
Alexander Hamilton

Before the American Revolution, the Thirteen Colonies were ruled by the Crown of Great Britain. The Founding Fathers of the United States largely rejected monarchism in favor of republicanism, and the Revolutionary War was fought to free the colonies from monarchy. About one-fifth of Americans during the revolution were part of the loyalist faction that wished to remain a monarchy under the British crown, and after the United States became an independent country, thousands of loyalists emigrated to Britain or to other colonies. Following the revolution, some individuals supported the continuation of monarchism in the United States. Most notably, Alexander Hamilton proposed an elective monarchy as the American system of government, favoring a strong executive with lifetime rule. Other supporters of monarchism at the time include the military officers that advocated in the Newburgh letter that George Washington become a monarch and the alleged Prussian scheme that sought to put the United States under the rule of Prince Henry of Prussia.

No major monarchist movements have emerged since the 18th century. The Constantian Society advocated monarchy in the late 20th century, but it did not see mainstream success. Elements of monarchism still exist in the function of the United States presidency. The office had many of its functions based on those of the British monarch, including its status as a unitary executive, its capacity over foreign affairs, and powers such as the presidential veto. Dark Enlightenment, a fringe neoreactionary movement that emerged in the late 2000s whose adherents include Curtis Yarvin, Peter Thiel, and Steve Bannon, largely rejects democracy and advocates for the implementation of either an absolute monarchy or a style of governance similar to a monarchy.

=== Separatism ===
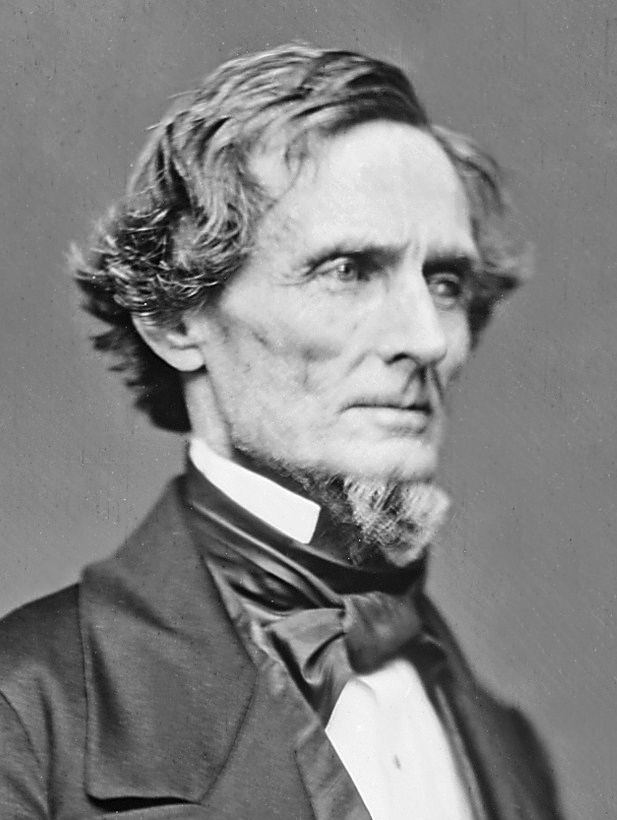
Jefferson Davis

Many separatist movements have advocated secession from the United States, though none have achieved major support since the American Civil War. The most significant separatist movement was secessionism in the southern United States in the 1860s. Politicians from the southern states declared independence and established the Confederate States of America, an unrecognized government led by Jefferson Davis, resulting in the American Civil War. Following the Civil War, the states were reincorporated into the union, and the Supreme Court ruled that unilateral secession was unconstitutional in Texas v. White.

The Republic of Texas was created when it seceded from Mexico before ultimately joining the United States. Since the admission of Texas as a state, various Texas secession movements have developed. A common misconception purports that Texas reserved the right to secede when it was admitted, but no such legal provision exists. Since at least the 1970s, various groups within the Pacific Northwest have advocated for the region to separate and form its own nation, largely based on the strong cultural, environmental, and demographic similarities the various states in the region share. Notable examples include the Cascadia independence movement, which advocates for Oregon, Washington, and the Canadian province of British Columbia to separate based on their economic, environmental, and cultural ties, and the Northwest Territorial Imperative, in which white supremacists advocated creating an ethnostate in the region due to its largely white demographics and isolated geography. The status of Puerto Rico in the United States has long been debated, with independence being considered as an alternative to statehood. Other notable separatist groups in the United States include Ka Lahui Hawaii and the Alaskan Independence Party, both of which have had membership in the tens of thousands.

Other notable proposals for secession have been suggested in the past. The Kentucky Resolution by Thomas Jefferson threatened secession in response to the Alien and Sedition Acts in 1798. The Nullification crisis represented another threat of secession in 1832. In the 21st century, political polarization has resulted in higher support for a division of the United States. As of 2021, two-thirds of Republicans in Southern states support a renewed Confederacy. Some extremist groups support racial separatism, which advocates separatism on the basis of race or ethnicity instead of geography. White separatism and Black separatism advocate the creation of ethnostates along racial lines.

=== Socialism ===
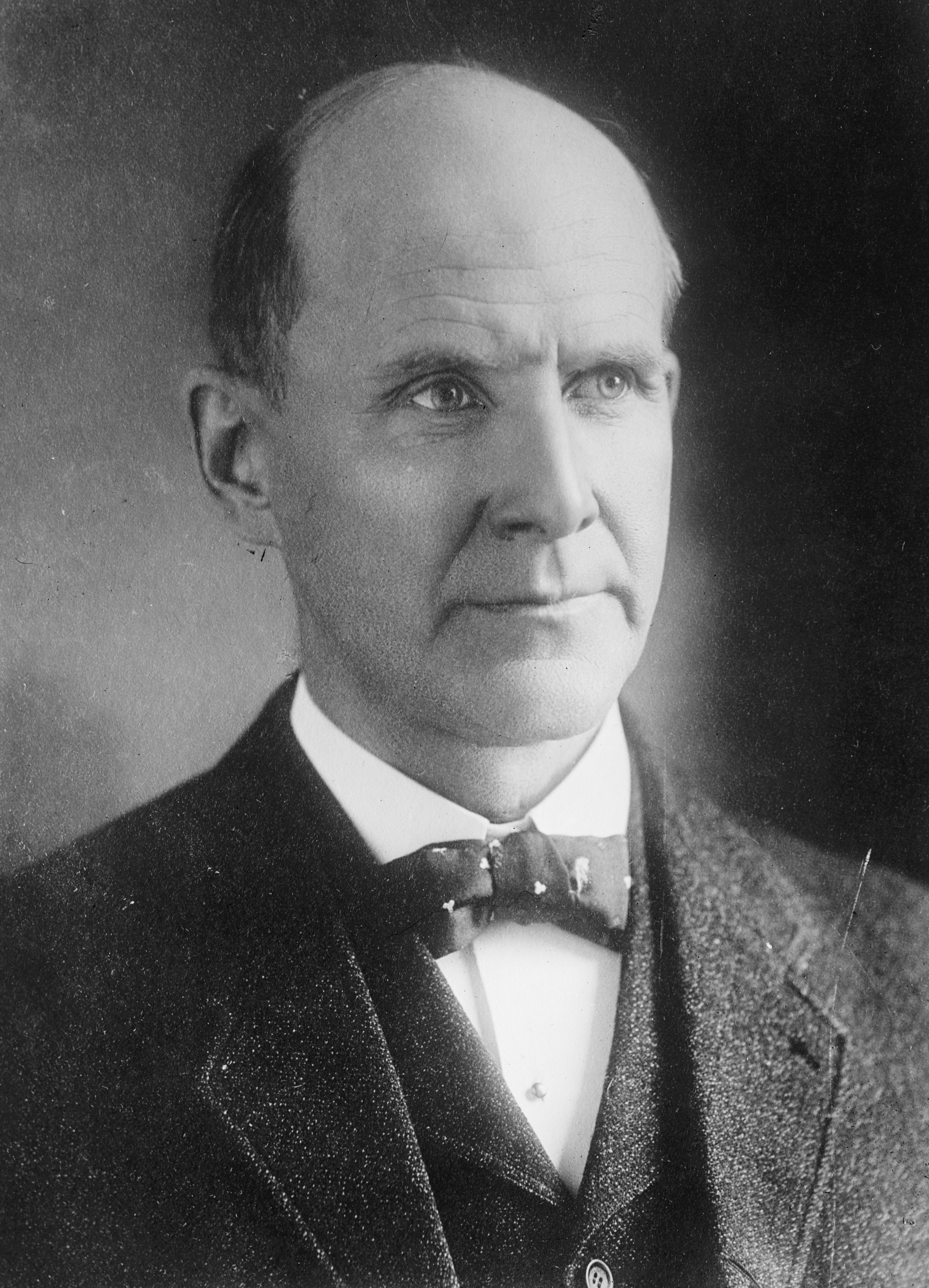
Eugene V. Debs

Socialists advocate the abolition of private property and social hierarchy in favor of collective ownership of the means of production. The Socialist Party of America was founded in 1901, and it saw moderate success as a third party, electing two members to Congress and running Eugene V. Debs as a notable third-party candidate in the 1912 and 1920 presidential elections. At the same time, anarchism gained a following in the United States and became the motivating ideology behind a wave of left-wing terrorism, including several bombings and the assassination of William McKinley. Following the Russian Revolution, socialism was negatively received by Americans, and strong social backlash to socialism resulted in the Red Scare.

"Socialism is a scare word they have hurled at every advance the people have made in the last 20 years. Socialism is what they called public power. Socialism is what they called social security. Socialism is what they called farm price supports. Socialism is what they called bank deposit insurance. Socialism is what they called the growth of free and independent labor organizations. Socialism is their name for almost anything that helps all the people."

— Harry S. Truman, 33rd president of the United States

Anti-socialism and anti-communism began to play a larger role in American politics during the Cold War. The New Left briefly existed as a socialist movement in the 1960s and 1970s. In the 21st century, perceptions of socialism have improved in the United States, especially among young Americans. As of 2025, the Democratic Socialists of America (DSA) is the largest socialist organization in the United States, with over 90,000 members. This group advocates democratic socialism, including the nationalization of major industries and the transfer of other industries from private ownership to workers' ownership. The group has over 250 elected members, with 90% elected after 2019. The terms "socialist" and "communist" are sometimes used erroneously as epithets to describe political figures and ideologies. Many politicians, political groups, and policies in the United States have been referred to as socialist despite supporting welfare capitalism with government programs and regulations. When polled, a significant portion of Americans were unable to accurately identify what socialism was, believing it to refer to government spending, welfare programs, equal rights, or liberalism, and 23 percent had no opinion.

== Demographics of ideological groups ==
Men in the United States tend to be slightly more conservative than women. As of 2021, 41% of men identified as conservative, compared to 32% of women. Voter turnout tends to be slightly higher among women than among men. A gender gap has been found to exist in voting patterns, with women more likely to vote for the Democratic Party since the 1970s. Military intervention and the death penalty are significantly more popular among men than women, while gun control and social welfare programs are significantly more popular among women than men. Men that identify with hypermasculinity and women that identify with hyperfemininity have been found to lean more conservative than those that do not.

Race is correlated with partisanship in the United States. White Americans are more likely to support Republican candidates. The majority of African Americans have been Democrats since 1936, and they continue to be seen as a reliable voting bloc for the Democratic Party, with as many as 82% of African Americans identifying as Democrats in 2000. Black political candidates are generally perceived as more liberal than white candidates. Asian Americans do not have a shared national and political identity, and as such are not considered a distinct voting bloc, though they have increasingly supported the Democratic Party in the 21st century. Native Americans slightly favor the Democratic Party, though Native American tribes are often separated from American society and do not participate heavily in national politics.

Younger Americans tend to lean liberal, while older Americans tend to lean conservative. As of 2021, 23% of Americans aged 18 to 29 are conservative, compared to 45% of Americans aged 65 and up. Likewise, 34% of Americans aged 18 to 29 are liberal compared to 21% aged 65 and up. Americans' political ideologies generally do not change much as they grow older, but ideological shifts in one's life are more likely to move to the right than to the left. Younger voters and older voters typically consider the same factors when voting. After reaching their mid-60s, correct voting sharply declines among voters, with a majority of elderly voters in their 80s and 90s casting votes that contradict their stated beliefs. This is attributed to decreasing cognitive capabilities as well as an ability to access up-to-date information due to slower manual dexterity and difficulty using technology.

As of 2014, Christians make up 85% of conservatives and 52% of liberals, non-Christian faiths make up 3% of conservatives and 10% of liberals, and the religiously unaffiliated make up 11% of conservatives and 36% of liberals. A majority of Mormons and Evangelical Protestants and a plurality of Catholics in the United States identify as conservative, while a plurality of Buddhists, Hindus, Jews, and the irreligious identify as liberal. Identifying with a religious tradition has been found to reduce political participation, but participation in church activities has been found to increase political participation. Religious Americans that believe in a God who intervenes in human affairs are less likely to participate in politics. Political beliefs and religious beliefs in the United States are closely intertwined, with both affecting the other.

Highly educated Americans are more likely to be liberal. In 2015, 44% of Americans with college degrees identified as liberal, while 29% identified as conservative. Americans without college experience were about equally likely to identify as liberal or conservative, with roughly half identifying as having mixed political values. This divide primarily exists between educated and uneducated white voters, and it marks a reversal of previous trends where college-educated whites were more conservative. Several reasons for this phenomenon have been proposed, including college graduates spending more time in liberal cities, a prioritization of science over traditional authority, college students being exposed to new ideas, and conservative distrust of higher education. Income is not a major factor in political ideology. In 2021, each income group had a nearly identical distribution of ideologies, matching the general population.

== Comparison to global politics ==
While liberal and conservative are the primary ideological descriptors in the United States, they do not necessarily correlate to usage of the terms in other countries. In the United States, liberalism refers specifically to social liberalism and cultural liberalism, and it leans farther to the left than liberalism in other countries. Conservatism is derived from the traditions of a society, so American conservatism reflects the ideas of classical liberalism and Christian belief that were dominant in the early history of the United States. The American conception of freedom is distinct on the world stage, with freedom often recognized as limitations on state power rather than obligations of the state. The right to property is given high priority, and taxes are particularly unpopular. Activism and personal participation in politics are encouraged, and civic engagement is considered a trait of good citizenship. Membership in civic organizations and participation in protests are common forms of civic engagement. Equal opportunity is typically more popular than equality of outcome.

Historically, the ideology of the United States was based in constitutional republicanism. This came directly in opposition to the monarchism and aristocracy of European kingdoms and of Great Britain in particular. This political history of constitutional republicanism is closely related to that of South America. Both regions have a shared history of colonialism, revolutionary war, federalist republicanism, and presidential systems. Political traits that are sometimes considered distinct to the United States are also common in South America, including common ideological positions on religion, crime, economy, national identity, multiculturalism, and guns. Political ideology is one of the primary factors to which the Cold War is attributed, and it affects how the United States operates as a global superpower. American ideology is centered in liberal democracy and capitalism, and global politics in second half of the 20th century was defined by its opposition to the Marxism–Leninism of the Soviet Union and the Eastern Bloc. The United States has undertaken nation-building in several countries, directly influencing the political systems of the Philippines, Germany, Austria, Japan, Somalia, Haiti, Bosnia, Kosovo, Afghanistan, and Iraq.

American politics is dominated by individualist ideology instead of the collectivist ideology that influences politics in some European countries. American citizens expect less influence and intervention by the government and are less likely to accept government intervention compared to citizens of European countries. Ideologies that advocate collective rights are not well received by American voters if they come at the cost of individual rights. Americans and Western Europeans have a similar conception of democracy and governance, prioritizing a free judiciary and fair elections at about equal levels. Americans and Western Europeans are also similarly progressive on issues such as LGBT rights and gender equality; however, Americans place higher priority on freedom of religion than Western European countries, and Americans are more likely to believe that individual success is within a person's control. Both social democracy and nativism have become more prominent in the 21st century United States, resembling their counterparts in many European countries. Democracy in both the United States and European countries are threatened by rising anti-establishmentism and the resulting extremism and polarization. The two-party system and Congressional gridlock make the United States more susceptible to polarization than countries with other systems, though this structure also prevents extremist parties from taking power.

== See also ==
- Anarchism in the United States
- Economic history of the United States
- Factions in the Democratic Party (United States)
- Factions in the Republican Party (United States)
- Pacifism in the United States
- Pew Research Center political typology
- Political culture of the United States
- Politics of the United States
- Red states and blue states
- Southernization

== Bibliography ==
- Foner, Eric (1980). Politics and Ideology in the Age of the Civil War. Oxford University Press. ISBN 9780195029260.
- Gerring, John (1998). Party Ideologies in America, 1828–1996. Cambridge University Press. ISBN 9781139174992.
- MacDonald, William (1906). Hart, Albert Bushnell (ed.). The American Nation: A History. Vol. 15. Harper & Brothers. ISBN 9780722286821.
- McCormick, Richard L. (1986). The Party Period and Public Policy. Oxford University Press. ISBN 9780195038606.
- Wood, Gordon S. "Classical Republicanism and the American Revolution." Chicago-Kent Law Review 66 (1990): 13+ online.
