= Vote Compass =

Voting advice application

- Owner: Vox Pop Labs
- Website: votecompass.com

Vote Compass is an interactive, online voting advice application developed by political scientists and run during election campaigns. It surveys users about their political views and, based on their responses, calculates the individual alignment of each user with the parties or candidates running in a given election contest.

It is operated by a social enterprise called Vox Pop Labs in partnership with locale-specific news organizations, including the Wall Street Journal, Vox Media, the Canadian and Australian Broadcasting Corporations, Television New Zealand, France24, RTL Group, and Grupo Globo.

Vote Compass also operates under the trademarks Boussole électorale and Wahl-Navi for French- and German-language iterations, respectively.

== Background ==
Vote Compass was developed by Clifton van der Linden, a professor in the Department of Political Science at McMaster University. It is run by van der Linden along with a team of social and statistical scientists from Vox Pop Labs.

Although inspired by European Voting Advice Applications, van der Linden explicitly rejects this terminology, arguing that Vote Compass was "never intended to account for every variable that influences voter choice and its results should not be interpreted as voting advice."

== Methodology ==
Using a Likert scale, users indicate their responses to a series of policy propositions designed to discriminate between candidates' policies on prominent issues relevant to the election. Propositions are crafted in collaboration with political scientists local to each jurisdiction in which Vote Compass is run.

Based on a candidate or political party's public disclosures (i.e. party manifestos, policy proposals, official websites, speeches, media releases, statements made in the legislature, etc.) they are calibrated on the same propositions and scales as are users. A series of aggregation algorithms calculate the overall distance between the user and the candidates or parties.

There have been claims that Vote Compass surveys have the potential to become push polling, if the survey questions posed are poorly designed.
