= Pew Research Center =

Think tank based in Washington, D.C., US

- Parent institution: The Pew Charitable Trusts
- Established: July 1, 2004; 22 years ago
- Chair: Robert Groves
- Head: Michael Dimock
- Staff: 160+
- Budget: Revenue: $36 million; Expenses: $43 million; (FYE June 2021)
- Address: 901 E Street NW, Suite 300
- Location: Washington, D.C., United States
- Coordinates: 38.897°N 77.024°W
- Interactive map of Pew Research Center
- Website: www.pewresearch.org

The Pew Research Center (also simply known as Pew) is a nonpartisan American think tank based in Washington, D.C. It provides information on social issues, public opinion, and demographic trends shaping the United States and the world. It also conducts public opinion polling, demographic research, random sample survey research, and panel based surveys, media content analysis, and other empirical social science research.

The Pew Research Center states it does not take policy stances. It is a subsidiary of the Pew Charitable Trusts and a charter member of the American Association of Public Opinion Research's Transparency Initiative.

== History ==
In 1990, the Times Mirror Company founded the Times Mirror Center for the People & the Press as a research project, tasked with conducting polls on politics and policy. Andrew Kohut became its director in 1993, and the Pew Charitable Trusts became its primary sponsor in 1996, when it was renamed the Pew Research Center for the People & the Press. The research center was named after the trust, which in turn is named after its founders, the Pew family.

In 2004, the trust established the Pew Research Center in Washington, D.C. In 2013, Kohut stepped down as president and became founding director, Alan Murray became the second president. In October 2014, Michael Dimock, a 14-year veteran of the center at the time of his selection, was named president.

== Staff ==
On January 21st, 2026 staff won their union elections. In the prior November management had declined to voluntarily recognize the union. It is affiliated with the Nonprofit Professional Employees Union (NPEU), a local of the International Federation of Professional and Technical Engineers.

== Funding ==
The Pew Research Center is a nonprofit, tax-exempt 501(c)(3) organization and a subsidiary of the Pew Charitable Trusts, its primary funder. For its studies focusing on demographics of religions in the world, the Pew Research Center has been jointly funded by the Templeton Foundation.

== Research topics ==
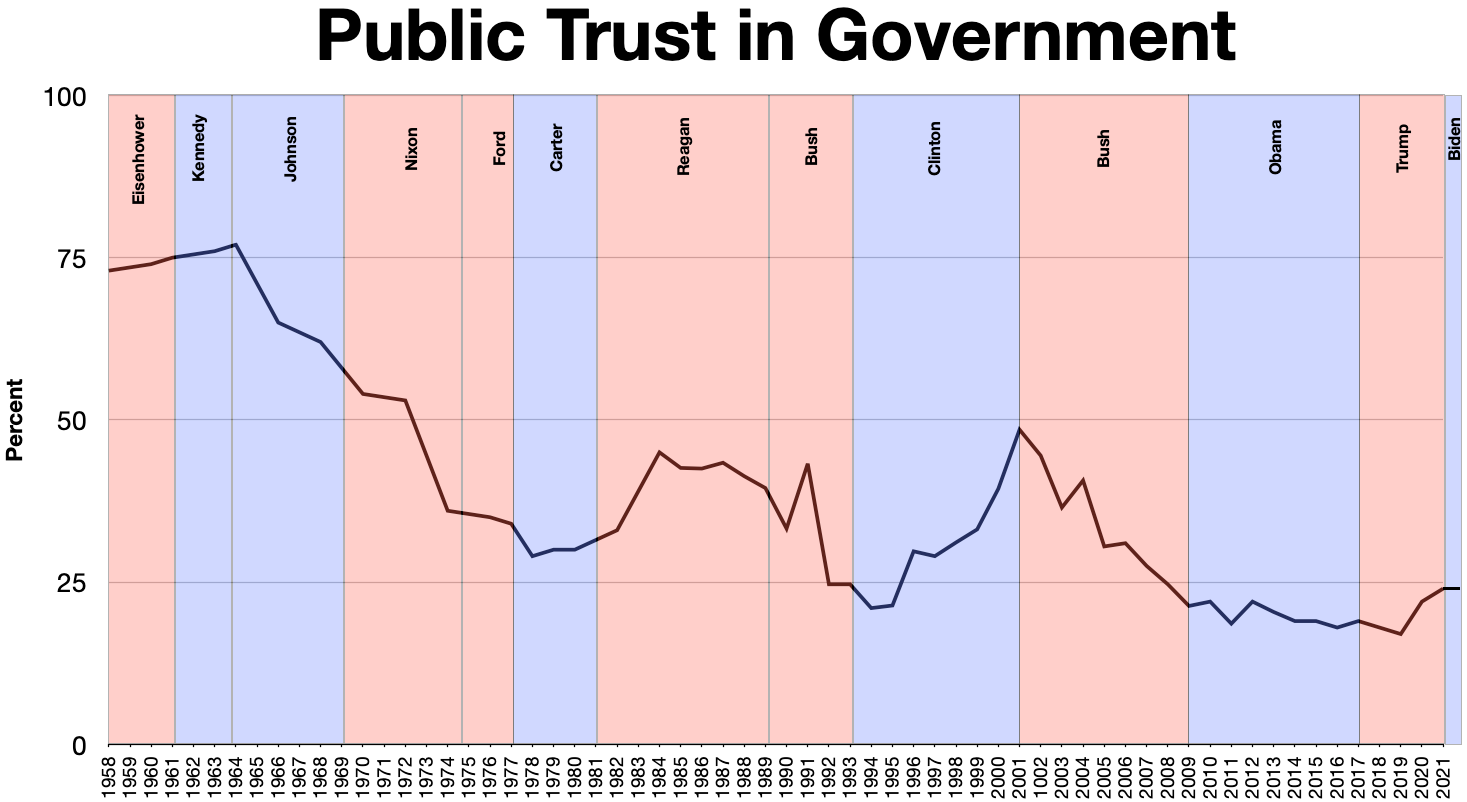
A Pew poll measuring the US public's trust in government, 1958 to 2021

The center's research includes the following topic areas:

- U.S. politics and policy positions
- International affairs
- Immigration & migration
- Race and ethnicity
- Religion
- Age & generations
- Gender & LGBTQ rights and views
- Family & relationships
- Economy & work
- Science
- Internet and technology
- News habits & media
- Methodological research
- Regions & countries
- Other such information

== See also ==
- Pew Research Center political typology
- Project for Excellence in Journalism
