= Pew Research Center political typology =

Political spectrum model

The Pew Research Center political typology (formerly the Times Mirror typology) is a political spectrum model developed by the Pew Research Center. It defines a series of voter profiles that identify specific segments of the electorate. First released in 1987 by the Times Mirror Company, the typology is updated every few years to reflect recent changes in the American electorate.

== 2021 typology ==
In the 2021 Pew Research Center political typology report, nine typology groups are identified, and these groups were organized into coalitions based on support for the Democratic Party and the Republican Party. Racial inequality in the United States was found to be the most divisive issue between the different groups. Democratic leaning groups were found to disagree on the scope of government while Republican leaning groups were found to disagree on economic policy. The groups most independent from political parties were found to have low political interest overall.

=== Republican coalition ===
Faith and Flag Conservatives are highly conservative and highly religious voters. They make up 10% of the public and 23% of the Republican coalition. Flag and Faith Conservatives generally support school prayer and military over diplomacy, while they generally oppose legalized abortion and same-sex marriage. They are also the group most likely to claim that the United States "stands above all other countries in the world" and that illegal immigration is a "very big national problem". Faith and Flag Conservatives are probably the most staunchly pro-Israel of all the typology groups, most of them favoring a greater Israel to end the Israel-Palestine conflict. Faith and Flag Conservatives are more likely to reject the concept of white privilege and to agree that white Americans face more discrimination than African Americans and people of color. 99% of Faith and Flag Conservatives voted for Donald Trump in the 2020 presidential election, and 86% claim that he won the election. Demographically, nearly half of Faith and Flag Conservatives are white evangelical Protestants, and they are the oldest of the typology groups with a median age of 57.

Committed Conservatives are conservative voters that emphasize pro-business views, international trade, and small government. They make up 7% of the public and 15% of the Republican coalition. They hold more moderate views on immigration and race than other groups in the Republican coalition. 96% of Committed Conservatives voted for Donald Trump in the 2020 presidential election, but they are less likely than other Republican groups to support false claims of electoral fraud. However, they are more likely to support Republicans in Congress. They are also more likely to support the use of COVID-19 vaccines than other Republican groups. Demographically, 82% of Committed Conservatives are white, a majority are ages 50 and older, and they make up the most educated Republican group.

The Populist Right are highly conservative anti-immigrant voters that oppose the role of government and big businesses in American society. They make up 11% of the public and 23% of the Republican coalition. 97% of the Populist Right voted for Donald Trump in the 2020 presidential election, and 85% claim that he won the election. The Populist Right are the most likely to believe that the number of legal immigrants should decrease and that the decreasing proportion of white Americans is bad for society, with 48% agreeing. They are also the Republican group most likely to support raising taxes on the rich. Demographically, 53% of the Populist Right are Protestants and they are one of the least educated groups.

The Ambivalent Right are younger voters that lean conservative on economic and race issues but lean moderate on social issues. They make up 12% of the public and 18% of the Republican coalition. 70% of the Ambivalent Right voted for Donald Trump in the 2020 presidential election, while 25% voted for Joe Biden, and a majority of the Ambivalent Right reject claims that Trump won the election. They are more likely than other Republican groups to support diplomacy over military strength, legalized marijuana, legalized abortion, and "openness to people from all over the world". Demographically, the Ambivalent Right are younger and more ethnically diverse than other Republican groups, and they are the least religious Republican group, with 27% identifying as religiously unaffiliated.

=== Democratic coalition ===
The Outsider Left are younger liberal voters that are skeptical of the political system and both major political parties. They make up 10% of the public and 16% of the Democratic coalition. Nearly all of the Outsider Left believe that the American political system unfairly favors powerful interests, and about half say that the government is wasteful and inefficient. They are the group most likely to say that no political candidate represents their political views and the group least likely to say that there is a "great deal of difference" between the parties. 94% of the Outsider Left voted for Joe Biden in the 2020 presidential election. In the Democratic primary, 38% supported Bernie Sanders, 18% supported Elizabeth Warren, and 12% supported Joe Biden. Demographically, the Outsider Left are the youngest group, with 83% being under the age of 50. The group is racially diverse, with only 49% being white Americans. They are also one of the least religious groups, with 51% identifying as religiously unaffiliated.

Democratic Mainstays are older Democrats that are economically liberal and socially moderate. They make up 16% of the public and 28% of the Democratic coalition. Democratic Mainstays support higher taxes and expansion of the social safety net as well as stronger military policy. They are more likely than other Democratic groups to see violent crime as a "very big" national problem, to oppose increased immigration, and to say that people being too easily offended is a major problem. 92% of Democratic Mainstays voted for Joe Biden in the 2020 presidential election. Demographically, the group is racially diverse with the largest share of African American voters. They are also more religious than other Democratic groups.

Establishment Liberals are highly liberal voters that are loyal to the Democratic Party. They make up 13% of the public and 23% of the Democratic coalition. Establishment Liberals are more likely than other groups to seek compromise and to hold an optimistic view of society. They are the most likely group to support Joe Biden, the Democratic Party, the system of American government, and technology companies. 98% of Establishment Liberals voted for Joe Biden in the 2020 presidential election. In the Democratic primary, 30% supported Joe Biden, 17% supported Elizabeth Warren, 16% supported Bernie Sanders, and 10% supported Pete Buttigieg. Demographically, they are racially diverse and one of the most educated groups.

The Progressive Left are younger highly liberal voters. They make up 6% of the public and 12% of the Democratic coalition. The Progressive Left typically believe that the scope of government should "greatly expand" and that the institutions of the United States need to be "completely rebuilt" to combat racism. They are the most likely group to say that there are countries better than the United States, that the American military should be reduced, that fossil fuels should be phased out, and that the existence of billionaires is bad for society. 98% of the Progressive Left voted for Joe Biden in the 2020 presidential election. In the Democratic primary, 35% supported Bernie Sanders, 28% supported Elizabeth Warren, and 15% supported Joe Biden. Demographically, 68% of the Progressive Left is made up of white voters, making it the least racially diverse group of Democratic coalition. They lean younger and less religious, and they are the most likely group to be fully vaccinated against COVID-19.

=== Stressed Sideliners ===
Stressed Sideliners make up the portion of the American electorate that do not strongly associate with any political ideology and have low interest in politics. They make up 15% of the public, 13% of the Democratic coalition, and 15% of the Republican coalition. 45% lean Democratic, 45% lean Republican, and 10% do not lean toward either party. As a whole, Stressed Sideliners generally lean liberal on economic issues and lean conservative on social issues. They generally support raising the minimum wage to $15 per hour and believe that the American economic system unfairly favors the powerful. They are also the group most likely to agree with the statements that "most big issues facing the country today don't have clear solutions" and "you can't be too careful in dealing with people". 49% voted for Donald Trump while 48% voted for Joe Biden in the 2020 presidential election. However, Stressed Sideliners are less likely to vote than other groups, with only 45% voting in 2020. Demographically, 57% of Stressed Sideliners are white, 56% are women, and they are one of the least wealthy and least educated groups.

== Previous typologies ==
=== 1987 typology ===
The 1987 report defined nine values and orientations that underlie political ideologies in the United States: religious faith, tolerance, social justice, militant anti-communism, alienation, American exceptionalism, financial pressure, attitudes toward government, and attitudes toward business corporations. The report establishes 11 voter profiles, and each profile makes up 7-11% of the 1987 adult population in the United States. The same typology groups were used in an updated report released in 1990.

Enterprises were pro-business, anti-government Republicans that wished to reduce the deficit through decreased spending. Moralists were highly conservative, highly religious middle-aged Republicans. Upbeats were young, Republican-leaning voters that believed in American exceptionalism and were optimistic about the governing of the United States. Disaffecteds were middle-aged Republican-leaning voters that were highly skeptical of both government and business. Bystanders were voters that did not vote, typically young and poorly educated. Followers were Democratic-leaning voters that were indifferent to American government but supported spending to reduce unemployment. Seculars were non-religious Democratic-leaning voters. '60s Democrats were upper-middle-class Democrats that supported social justice and government spending. The New Dealers were older blue-collar union Democrats that favored social spending but opposed social tolerance. The Passive Poor were older and poorer Democrats that supported American government and social justice. The Partisan Poor were low income Democrats that supported social justice and showed strong partisan support.

=== 1994 typology ===
The 1994 report updated the political typography by changing some of the typology groups to reflect changes in the electorate. Among the Republicans, the pro-business Enterprisers and the religious Moralists remained from the 1987 report. The Libertarians were identified as a cross section of the Enterprises and the Seculars of the previous report that supported the Republican Party's small business position but opposed the Christian right. Among the center, the Bystanders continued to represent those that did not participate in politics. The New Economy Independents were swing voters held moderate beliefs and opposed both major parties. The Embittered were low income voters that had no faith in either major party. Among the Democrats, the Seculars, the New Dealers, and the Partisan Poor remained from the 1987 report. The New Democrats were formed from the Upbeats of the previous report after their allegiance shifted from Republicans to Democrats.

=== 1999 typology ===
The 1999 report updated the typology to reflect the electorate going into the 2000 presidential election. Among the Republicans, the Staunch Conservatives were defined as the successors to the Enterprisers, supporting pro-business and socially conservative politics. The Moderate Republicans were defined as the successors of the Upbeats that remained with the Republican Party after many shifted their support to the Democratic Party. The Populist Republicans were defined as successors to the Moralists, poorer and highly religious voters that support social conservatism and government spending. Among the center, New Prosperity Independents were defined as wealthy independents that were satisfied with the government. The Disaffecteds were restored from the 1987 report, replacing the Embittered as low income voters that feel estranged from both political parties. The Bystanders were retained from the previous report. Among the Democrats, the Liberal Democrats were defined as a merger of the Seculars and the 60s Democrats, highly educated voters that supported liberal views on social issues. The Socially Conservative Democrats were defined as successors to the New Dealers. The New Democrats and the Partisan Poor were retained from the previous report.

=== 2005 typology ===
The 2005 report updated the typology in response to changes following the first term of President George W. Bush, the September 11 attacks, and the war on terror. It found that issues of national security and assertive foreign policy had consensus within the parties but a strong gap between Republicans and Democrats. Issues relating to environmentalism, regulation, isolationism versus global activism, and immigration caused divisions within the parties. Issues relating to religious values, welfare, cooperation with allies, free markets, attitudes of cynicism, and attitudes of individualism caused divisions both within and between the parties.

Among Republicans, the Enterprisers were retained from previous reports as highly conservative pro-business Republicans. The Social Conservatives represented a merger of the Moralists and the Moderate Republicans, supporting strong foreign policy while opposing welfare and immigration. The Pro-Government Conservatives were defined as successors to the Populist Republicans, being highly religious and conservative but supporting a social safety net. The Upbeats were retained as supporters of both government and business, also absorbing the New Prosperity Independents. Among the center, the Disaffecteds were retained, representing those that were skeptical of both parties. The Bystanders were also retained, representing those that did not participate in politics. Among Democrats, the Liberals were identified as the largest share of Democrats, representing a merger of the Liberal Democrats, the Seculars, and the 60s Democrats. The Conservative Democrats were the successors of the Socially Conservative Democrats and the New Dealers, being more religious and less liberal than other Democrats. The Disadvantaged Democrats were the successors of the Partisan Poor, supporting Democrats and the government while opposing big business.

Pro-Government Conservatives and Bystanders were the smallest groups, making up only 9% of the population, while Liberals were the largest group, making up 17% of the population. The Liberals and the Enterprisers were the wealthiest, while the Bystanders and the Disadvantaged Dems were the least wealthy. The Liberals and the Enterprisers were also the most educated, while the Disaffecteds, and the Disadvantaged Dems were the least educated. Protestants made up a majority of all groups except for the Bystanders and the Liberals. Liberals were more religiously diverse than other groups, with disproportionate Jewish and secular membership. Catholics were more evenly distributed, making up 20-30% of each group.

In terms of race, conservatives and liberals were fairly similar, with more than 80% identifying as white and having been born in the United States. However, Republican voting conservatives like Enterprisers, Social Conservatives and Pro-Government Conservatives had a higher white percentage than liberals, especially Enterprisers and Social Conservatives, who were both 91% white, compared to 83% of Liberals. Liberals were also the most likely to be born outside of the United States, with 20% of liberal respondents saying that they or their parents were born outside of the United States while only around 12% of all conservative types answered "yes" to the same question.

=== 2011 typology ===
The 2011 report was updated to reflect change in voter opinion following the Great Recession and in anticipation of the 2012 presidential election. This report created new typology groups based on voters' opinions of government performance, religion and morality, business, environmentalism, immigration, race, social safety net, foreign policy assertiveness, and financial security.

Staunch Conservatives were highly conservative and highly religious voters affiliated with the Tea Party movement, supporting military strength while opposing big government and environmental laws. Main Street Republicans were conservative voters primarily from the South and the Midwest, generally opposing government while supporting environmental regulations. Libertarians were economically conservative and socially liberal voters, with a higher proportion of wealthy and male voters than other groups. The Disaffecteds were poorer socially conservative voters that supported government assistance to the poor but saw the government as inefficient. The Post-Moderns were well-off voters that supported government regulation and environmentalism while opposing liberal stances on race and welfare. The New Coalition Democrats were poorer religious voters that supported immigration and government regulation, making up the only majority-minority group. Hard-Pressed Democrats were socially conservative blue-collar Democrats that supported welfare but opposed immigration and big business. Solid Liberals were pro-government Democrats that supported regulation, environmentalism, and welfare, making up the most secular group. Bystanders were Americans that were not registered to vote, leaning younger, poorer, and less educated.

=== 2014 typology ===
The 2014 report updated the typology with eight groups. Steadfast Conservatives were highly conservative voters that strongly opposed the role of the federal government. Business Conservatives were small-government conservatives that supported Wall Street and immigration. The Young Outsiders were younger moderate conservatives that opposed the role of government but supported social liberal policies. Hard-Pressed Skeptics were cynical poorer voters that support welfare policies. The Next Generation Left were highly liberal younger voters that supported Wall Street and opposed welfare. The Faith and Family Left were socially conservative voters that supported an increased role for government. The Solid Liberals were highly liberal voters that consistently supported the Democratic Party. Bystanders were Americans that were not involved in the political process.

== Reception ==
The 2021 edition of the typology report received coverage from major news organizations, including NPR, PBS, and The Washington Post.

== Data ==
Data are from the Pew Research Center's 2017 Political Typology survey:

Republican Party	General public	Registered voters	White non-Hispanic	College education+	Income ≥ $75,000	Trump approval
Core Conservatives	13%	15%	85%	33%	49%	90%
Country First Conservatives	6%	7%	83%	16%	27%	93%
Market Skeptic Republicans	12%	12%	77%	20%	30%	64%
New Era Enterprisers	11%	11%	66%	26%	33%	62%
Democratic Party	General public	Registered voters	White non-Hispanic	College education+	Income of $75k+	Trump approval
Devout and Diverse	9%	9%	44%	15%	16%	34%
Disaffected Democrats	14%	14%	41%	22%	19%	8%
Opportunity Democrats	12%	13%	57%	34%	38%	15%
Solid Liberals	16%	19%	73%	57%	48%	<1%
Unaffiliated	General public	Registered voters	White non-Hispanic	College education+	Income of $75k+	Trump approval
Bystanders	8%	0%	37%	9%	12%	27%

Demographic	Total	Republican Party				Democratic Party				Bystanders
Demographic	Total	Core Conservatives	Country First Conservatives	Market Skeptic Republicans	New Era Republicans	Devout and Diverse	Disaffected Democrats	Opportunity Democrats	Solid Liberals	Bystanders
Sex
Male	49%	67%	54%	51%	52%	45%	40%	50%	41%	49%
Female	51%	33%	46%	49%	48%	55%	60%	50%	59%	51%
Age
18–29	21%	11%	5%	18%	26%	14%	22%	24%	25%	32%
30–49	32%	27%	20%	36%	29%	25%	39%	31%	36%	37%
50–64	28%	36%	37%	25%	21%	37%	24%	28%	22%	25%
≥ 65	19%	25%	34%	20%	23%	23%	14%	15%	16%	5%
Race
White	66%	85%	83%	77%	66%	44%	41%	57%	73%	37%
Black	12%	1%	1%	5%	4%	30%	29%	14%	8%	9%
Hispanic	16%	5%	4%	9%	20%	16%	19%	20%	9%	43%
Other	6%	No data available								
Education
High school or less	40%	31%	50%	42%	40%	57%	40%	36%	17%	73%
Some college	32%	36%	34%	38%	34%	28%	37%	30%	26%	19%
College graduate	17%	23%	12%	13%	18%	10%	14%	20%	28%	5%
Postgraduate	12%	11%	4%	7%	8%	6%	9%	14%	29%	4%
Income
< $30,000	34%	12%	30%	31%	30%	50%	42%	27%	17%	49%
$30,000–$74,999	32%	29%	31%	32%	27%	21%	31%	30%	31%	28%
≥ $75,000	35%	49%	27%	30%	33%	16%	19%	38%	48%	12%
Religion
White evangelical Protestant	18%	34%	43%	25%	17%	14%	8%	9%	4%	6%
White mainline Protestant	15%	18%	17%	18%	16%	8%	8%	13%	12%	6%
Black Protestant	9%	<1%	1%	3%	2%	23%	21%	10%	4%	4%
Other Protestant	10%	7%	9%	8%	11%	10%	9%	7%	4%	17%
White Catholic	12%	15%	13%	13%	13%	9%	7%	11%	11%	5%
Hispanic Catholic	8%	3%	2%	4%	9%	8%	9%	10%	3%	21%
Unaffiliated	28%	13%	8%	20%	17%	19%	28%	26%	48%	30%
Region
Northeast	17%	15%	15%	18%	19%	14%	15%	20%	23%	14%
Midwest	21%	22%	22%	24%	20%	22%	22%	22%	21%	17%
South	38%	42%	45%	39%	37%	44%	41%	36%	28%	37%
West	23%	21%	18%	19%	25%	19%	22%	23%	28%	31%

== See also ==
- Factions in the Democratic Party (United States)
- Factions in the Republican Party (United States)
- Political ideologies in the United States
