= Political literacy =

Abilities needed for an effective electorate

Political literacy is a set of abilities considered necessary for citizens to participate in a society's government.

== Definitions ==
Denver and Hands (1990) defined political literacy as "the knowledge and understanding of the political process and political issues which enables people to perform their roles as citizens effectively." However, political scientists differ on whether interest in politics and media exposure should be considered as factors in political literacy.

The Crick Report, a British curriculum report published in 1998 by an advisory group on citizenship chaired by Bernard Crick, sees political literacy as the outcome of people "learning about and how to make themselves effective in public life through knowledge, skills and values". The report noted that effective citizenship education required learning about social and moral responsibility, and community involvement, alongside political literacy. The authors of this report considered it important to note that political literacy was a wider concept than "political knowledge alone".

== History ==
Between the 1960s and 1980s, researchers reported that school students had low interest in political and economic problems. In 1978, the Hansard Society wrote a report advocating for teaching "political education and political literacy", but support for this proposal fell in the 1980s. In Scotland, higher modern studies appeared as a secondary qualification in the 1960s and 1970s.

== Concepts ==
Political literacy includes an understanding of how government works and of the important issues facing society, as well as the critical thinking skills to evaluate different points of view. Many organizations interested in participatory democracy are concerned about political literacy.

== Application ==
=== United States ===
In the United States, the proposition is that most people are politically illiterate, where political literacy is a set of abilities, skill, knowledge, and proficiency considered necessary for citizens to participate in a society's government.

There are three major theories about political literacy:

- Cognitive mobilization, which claims that education and political involvement move an individual to use their own mental abilities in a political context.
- Structural role, which claims that the way a person behaves politically is determined by their role in society.
- Socialization agents, which claims that families and schools act as "agents", directly transmitting their own political values to the people.

==== Participating in a democratic government ====
Participating in a democratic government includes the following:

1. Voting for elected representatives at all levels of government from local to state and federal government enterprises.
2. Attending public meetings such as town hall meetings to ask questions and obtain information first-hand.
3. Studying and evaluating elected candidate resumes and credentials.
4. Studying and understanding the jobs that are filled by elected officials.
5. Offering suggestions for laws and regulations, including amendments.
6. Reviewing plans, programs, budgets, and schedules that affect taxation.

==== U.S. political system ====
Presumptions in the American political system include:

1. The Rule of Law: the rule of law restricts the arbitrary exercise of power by subordinating it to well-defined and established laws.
2. The Universal Right to Vote
3. The Universal Declaration of Human Rights
4. The US Constitution

The universal right to vote is called suffrage (also called the universal franchise, general suffrage, and ordinary person's common suffrage). It means giving the right to vote to all adult citizens, regardless of wealth, income, gender, social status, race, ethnicity, or any other restriction, subject only to relatively minor exceptions. In a democratic republic such as the United States of America, the accepted practice is for everyone to vote. Some voters are better educated than others. Election results are thus the product of the average consensus. A better educated and informed electorate presumably produces a better government. If more uneducated and uninformed voters participate, the average drops, and the result is a more deficient government.

Therefore, one of society's goals is to raise education and information among the electorate. However, some people and politicians prefer to exploit voter ignorance and deficiencies for personal gain at the expense of better governance.

The rule of law implies all are intended to be understood and comprehend by everyone under the principle that ignorance of the law is no excuse.

==== Self-governance ====
One of the many challenges in American democracy is supporting citizens by ensuring they have sufficient time and opportunity to engage their responsibilities as citizens. How much time does a citizen voter need to engage their responsibility for self-governance?

To answer that question requires attention to a hierarchy of other questions:

What does it take to ensure a good life for a given citizen and their responsibilities?

1. Is there a deficit or deficiency between what is essential for sustainable living and present life circumstances?
2. If there are deficiencies, what is required to address them?
3. How much discretionary time is available to attend to voter-citizen responsibilities?
4. How much time and commitment is needed to be a responsible citizen?
5. What is necessary to sustain or improve skill, knowledge, and proficiency deficiencies and needs?

== See also ==
- Low information voter
- Voting advice application
