= VoteMatch =

Dutch voting advice website

VoteMatch (Dutch: StemWijzer) is a Dutch voting advice application developed by ProDemos. It was launched in 1989, and it has been available on the Internet since 1998. It is the most-used voting advice application in the Netherlands.

== Functionality and influence ==
To determine their preference of political party, prospective voters are asked to provide their opinion on 30 statements on a three-point rating scale. Users are then presented with a ranking of political parties, ordered by how closely their views align with the positions of the parties.

VoteMatch was consulted over 2 million times for both the 2002 and 2003 Dutch general elections, and its use grew to between 4.2 and 4.85 million times for general elections in 2006, 2010, and 2012. It was used 6.8 and 7.8 million times for the 2017 and 2021 general elections, respectively, making it the most widely used voting advice application in the Netherlands. A group of researchers concluded that biases by VoteMatch in the 2006 general election resulted in Christian Democratic Appeal (CDA) and Party for Freedom (PVV) being favoured over the People's Party for Freedom and Democracy (VVD) and Labour Party (PvdA). It was used by 38% of the electorate.

== History ==
Due to its fragmented political party landscape, the Netherlands was the first country to develop voting advice applications. Summaries of election manifestoes of parties had been widespread since the 1970s. VoteMatch was developed by the Civic Education Foundation, which later became part of ProDemos, and it was launched on paper and floppy disk in 1989 as the first such tool in the country. It was intended for use in secondary education to increase familiarity with the contents of election manifestoes and to move attention in the campaign from candidates and media distractions to policy proposals. It became available on the Internet starting in 1998, and its popularity was subsequently fueled by collaborations with newspapers and television stations. A version has been published for each general election since, and the application has expanded to municipal, provincial, European Parliament, and water board elections. It was joined by a competitor called Kieskompas in 2006.

The developers of VoteMatch introduced StemmenTracker in 2012, for which party positions have been based on parliamentary votes on legislation. This followed concerns about political parties manipulating their responses or adjusting their election manifestoes to attract more voters in traditional voting advice applications.
