= Voting advice application =

Political party and candidate-selection aid

A voting advice application or voting aid application (VAA), also known as a vote matcher, or election compass is an application that helps voters find a political candidate or political party that stands closest to their preferences. VAAs are a recent phenomenon in modern election campaigning.

There has been debate in some countries regarding their popular VAAs. Some maintain that VAAs are problematic as they can never give neutral voting advice. Others contend that these applications rightfully focus people's attention on the party programmes and on policy issues, compelling parties to discuss substance instead of personalities, images and campaign events.

A study of VAAs by the University of Antwerp recommends careful selection of VAA statements and a proper process of benchmarking based on survey data. Without appropriate calibrating VAAs produce invalid results.

VAA questionnaires should be completed by the candidate or party for maximum accuracy, but also VAAs completed by the journalist are published, with supposed positions taken from party programmes and debates.

== Usage ==
In 2007, of 22 European countries, 15 had at least one VAA. Some of the most successful ones were the Dutch VoteMatch with 4.7 million consultations in 2006 (40% of the electorate) and the German Wahl-O-Mat with 6.7 million consultations in 2009 (12% of the electorate). Research showed that usage was higher in countries with proportional electoral systems and a larger number of parliamentary political parties, including Belgium, Finland, the Netherlands and Switzerland.

In Finland, the VotingAid phenomenon has produced rivalry between the most popular news channels, and voters are eager to compare the results between different VAA's. Out of Finland's electorate of 4.3 million, over 20% reportedly finds voting advice on the most popular VAA, launched by MTV3.

During the 2023 Czech presidential elections, there were about 2.4 million visitors of VAA Volební kalkulačka compared to 5.8 million voters in the elections.

== Effects on voting behaviour ==
Empirical research has indicated three ways in which voting behavior can be influenced by VAAs: by motivating users to engage in further research about party policies, motivating participation in the election and affecting vote intentions. A 2005 survey in Germany reported that more than half of the VAA users declared to have been motivated to do further research after taking the test. The effect of motivating participation has been confirmed by several surveys, and quantified as 22% in the 2003 elections in Finland, 8% in the 2005 elections in Germany elections and 12% in the 2003 elections in the Netherlands. The proportion of voters declaring to have changed their preferences as result of VAA has been 3% in Finland, 6% in Germany and 10% in the Netherlands, however a post-election survey conducted in Belgium showed only 1% actual change. The floating, undecided voters, however, have received a lot more help by VAA's. In a study conducted in Finland, three out of four voters say that the VAA has some effect on their voting decision. VAA helps one person out of four to make the decision straight based on the VAA's results.

On an internal, psychological level, Eric Armstrong argues that "not wanting to feel ignorant" causes voters to stay home. Rather than facing ballot choices on dozens of candidates and issues they know nothing about it, voters sit it out. They also stay home because their vote doesn't matter, either because it is superfluous (they are part of the majority) or pointless (they are part of the minority). And then there is the difficulty of acquiring and comparing information, and evaluating its reliability—especially in era when a "Clean Water Act" can be one that opens the door to increased pollution. Who or what is the voter to trust?

A Voting Advice Application may help address these issues when its use remains under the voter’s control. In the twentieth century, a comparable function was often performed by the party slate, which presented the set of candidates or choices endorsed by a political party. However, reliance on party slates could contribute to the concentration of political influence within party organisations.

A single-source Voting Advice Application differs from social-media-based voting advice in the degree of control it gives users over information sources. Social media platforms may allow users to consult a wide range of sources and select those they consider trustworthy, whereas a single-source application generally presents information or recommendations from a limited set of sources chosen by the provider.

== Benefits for democracy ==
Most of the VAA's collect and save the data given by users anonymously and that way they are able to create reports that show the overall opinion of that country's political status. Some of VAA tools can generate automatically many kind of different reports such as average distribution reports, comparisons between parties or voter groups and between voters and candidates. These different reporting methods help for example media channels to create news and raise topics of conversation in debates. When candidates answer personally on VAA's statements, everyone can see what the candidates think.

But the benefits for democracy go well beyond the gathering of statistics. Eric Armstrong argues that social media voting advice can raise voter turnout by providing convenient, "one stop shopping" for advice up and down the ballot, all from (and only from) trusted advisors the voter has subscribed to. Such advice can launch the careers of local candidates the voter might otherwise never have heard of, or pay attention to. And it can end the corrosive effect of the huge campaign contributions required to pay for the advertising that (today) is needed to win, and make elected officials more responsive to the electorate than their donors.

== Prominent Voting advice applications ==
=== Election Compass USA ===
Election Compass USA, developed in cooperation with the Wall Street Journal, was presented on 2 January 2008. Election Compass USA provides information about the 2008 US presidential elections. Within 3 weeks 1 million people visited Election Compass USA. At the end of the campaign, up to 3.8 million people used the website to obtain information about the candidates.

=== Israel Election Compass ===
In collaboration with the Israel Democracy Institute a compass was developed for the Israeli Knesset elections of 2009. Over 40.000 voters visited the website in the first hour after launch alone. Around election day, a total number of 600.000 people visited the compass.

=== EU Profiler ===
Together with the European University Institute and the Swiss Smartvote, Election Compass created the EU Profiler, a voting advice website for the European Parliament election in 2009.

=== Other ===
- Vote Compass - United States, Canada, Australia, New Zealand, France, and Germany
- Election calculator (Volební kalkulačka, Volebná kalkulačka, Voksmonitor, Wahlrechner, Kalkulatori zgjedhor) – Czech Republic, Slovakia, Hungary, Austria, Albania, Kosovo and European Union
- smartvote - Switzerland
- Kieskompas - Netherlands
- Vote Match - UK and EU
- Wahl-O-Mat - Germany
- Numerous, if not dozens, go by the name of "vaalikone" (in Finnish) or "valmaskin" (in Swedish). They are often offered in different languages, such as Finnish, Swedish or English and hosted by prominent media outlets, such as Yle, Helsingin Sanomat and Ilta-Sanomat. For the parliamentary elections in 2023, hyviaasioita.fi listed 13 voting advice applications - Finland
- BSW-O-Mat - A "single-party" VAA about the Bündnis Sahra Wagenknecht, a left-wing German political party
- EasyElections - US, UK, Canada and Australia
- Itamat - Italy

== See also ==
- Low information voter
- Political literacy
