= Kieskompas =

Dutch voting advice website

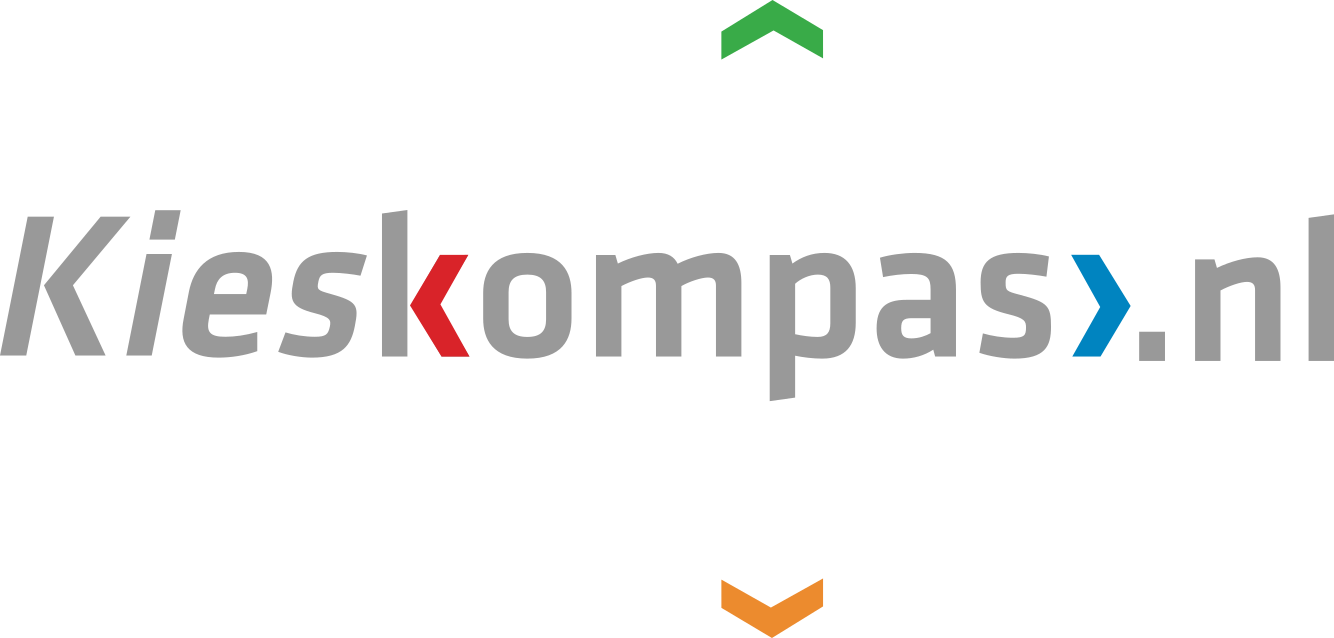
Logo

Kieskompas is a Dutch voting advice website. Visitors can use the application to discover their position in the political landscape for upcoming elections. Electoral Compass was officially established at the VU Amsterdam on 23 October 2007.

Users are asked to give an opinion on 30 propositions, clustered within several issues. The result appears in a spectrum, as a pencil point, between the different political parties or candidates. Visitors can further analyse their political preferences by clicking on the various issues, after which they can compare their position on these different topics with the candidates or parties.
