= Low information voter =

Voters who are poorly informed

Low information voters, also known as misinformation voters, are people who may vote yet are generally poorly informed about issues. The phrase is mainly used in the United States and has become popular since the mid-1990s.

== Origins ==
American pollster and political scientist Samuel Popkin coined the term "low-information" in 1991 when he used the phrase "low-information signaling" in his book The Reasoning Voter: Communication and Persuasion in Presidential Campaigns. Low-information signaling referred to cues or heuristics used by voters in lieu of substantial information to determine whom to vote for. Examples include voters liking Bill Clinton for eating at McDonald's, and perceiving John Kerry and Barack Obama as elitist for wind-surfing and golfing, respectively.

== Meaning ==
The ideological views of most low-information voters tend to be more moderate than those of high-information voters. Low-information voters are less likely to vote, and when they do, they generally vote for a candidate they find personally appealing. They tend to be swing voters, and they tend to vote split-ticket more than well-informed voters do. Researchers attribute this to low-information voters not having developed clear-cut ideological preferences. Linguist George Lakoff has written that the term is a pejorative mainly used by American liberals to refer to people who vote conservative against what liberals assume to be their own interests and assumes they do it because they lack sufficient information. He said that liberals attribute the problem in part to deliberate Republican efforts at misinforming voters.

In a 2011 article titled "Goodbye to All That: Reflections of a GOP Operative Who Left the Cult", thirty-year Republican House of Representatives and Senate staffer Mike Lofgren characterized low-information voters as anti-intellectual and hostile-to-science "religious cranks" and claimed Republicans are deliberately manipulating low information voters to undermine their confidence in American democratic institutions.

Popular syndicated talk show host Rush Limbaugh became aware of the term in the aftermath of the 2012 U.S. presidential election, initially joking that it could be interpreted to signify stupidity. However, Limbaugh later clarified that a low information voter may also be considered in his view a "high liberal information voter", expounding on media bias thusly: "I have never said that low-information voters are stupid. I just said they don't know what they think they know. They are prisoners to the media, which has dumbed them down. Low-information voters can be doctors. Low-information voters can be scientists. They can be among all walks of life. It has nothing to do with IQ. It has to do with what they don't know because of their media sources. Low-information voters are clearly people that don't have all the information available to make a voting choice. That's all they are. And they're all over the place. And most of them do vote Democrat. Most of them did vote for Obama. It's not a comment on their intelligence. It's not that they're stupid or don't understand the issues. They just haven't had it all explained to them."

A 2012 paper by six American political scientists called "A Theory of Political Parties: Groups, Policy Demands and Nominations in American Politics" challenged the idea that Republicans want a low-information electorate and argued that both major American parties do. Noting that 95% of incumbents in the highly polarized House of Representatives win re-election despite voters' preference for centrist representation, the paper theorizes that voters' infrequent penalizing of extremist behaviour represents not approval, but a lack of attention and information. The paper says this is supported by the fact that when congressional districts and media markets overlap to create more informed electorates, extremist House members are at much greater risk for defeat. The paper proposes that in the American political system, interest groups and activists are the key actors and that the electorate is uninformed and bamboozled.

== Effects ==
A 1992 study found that in the absence of other information, voters used candidates' physical attractiveness to draw inferences about their personal qualities and political ideology. A study performed using logistic regression analysis on data from the 1986 through 1994 American National Election Studies found that low-information voters tend to assume female and black candidates are more liberal than male and white candidates of the same party. A 2003 study that analyzed precinct-level data from city council elections held in Peoria, Illinois between 1983 and 1999 found that the placement of candidates' names on the ballot was a point of influence for low-information voters. An analysis concerned with the "puzzling finding" that incumbent legislators in mature democracies charged with corruption are not commonly punished in elections found that less-informed voters were significantly more likely to vote for incumbents accused of corruption than were their better-informed counterparts, presumably because they did not know about the allegations.

== Voting correctly ==
Related to the concept of a low information voter, voting correctly is a concept from political psychology that refers to a vote decision "that is the same as the choice which would have been made under conditions of full information." Measurements of correct votes are used to determine how accurate low information voters are at determining the candidate or party that best represents the voters' interests.

== See also ==
- Anti-intellectualism
- Political literacy
- Useful idiot
- Voting advice application
- Voting behavior
