= List of candidates in the 2025 Dutch general election =

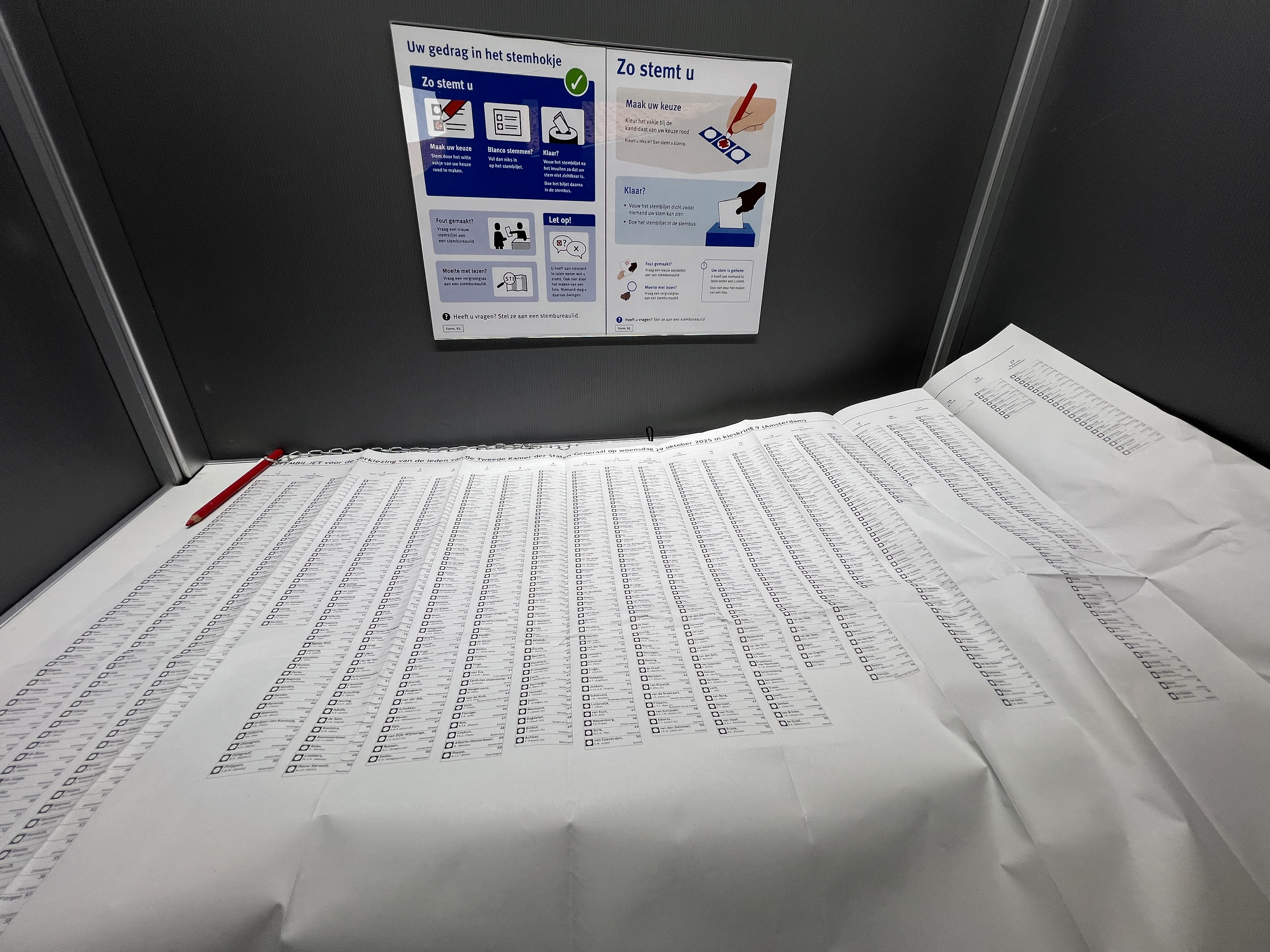
Ballot of the 2025 Dutch general election

For the 29 October 2025 Dutch general election, 27 electoral lists were successfully submitted, totalling 1,166 candidates.

== 1: Party for Freedom ==
Candidate list for the Party for Freedom
Position	Candidate	Votes	Result
1	Geert Wilders	1,666,202	Elected
2	Sebastiaan Stöteler	8,584	Elected
3	Shanna Schilder	20,426	Elected
4	Annelotte Lammers	6,967	Elected
5	Gidi Markuszower	1,738	Elected
6	Martin Bosma	17,350	Elected
7	René Claassen	1,919	Elected
8	Teun van Dijck	619	Elected
9	Marjolein Faber	9,813	Elected
10	Vicky Maeijer	1,520	Elected
11	Edgar Mulder	977	Elected
12	Alexander Kops	436	Elected
13	Elmar Vlottes	582	Elected
14	Marina Vondeling	1,411	Elected
15	Hidde Heutink	609	Elected
16	Jeremy Mooiman	614	Elected
17	Nicole Moinat	790	Elected
18	Dion Graus	977	Elected
19	Emiel van Dijk	444	Elected
20	Tamara ten Hove	906	Elected
21	Erwin Prickaertz	317	Elected
22	Raymond de Roon	280	Elected
23	Maikel Boon	597	Elected
24	Annette Raijer	613	Elected
25	Rachel van Meetelen	1,159	Elected
26	Chris Jansen	233	Elected
27	Max Aardema	923	
28	Marco Deen	273	
29	Jeanet Nijhof	1,268	
30	Henk de Vree	232	
31	Joeri Pool	204	
32	Patrick van der Hoeff	471	
33	Dennis Ram	720	
34	Patrick Crijns	724	
35	Peter Smitskam	156	
36	Willem Boutkan	520	
37	Folkert Thiadens	126	
38	Reinder Blaauw	576	
39	Jan Valize	600	
40	Chris Faddegon	72	
41	Canice Clermonts	315	
42	Nico Uppelschoten	169	
43	Peter van Haasen	161	
44	Eric Esser	474	
45	Robert Rep	317	
46	Cees Riezebos	100	
47	Sylvia Grobben	309	
48	Bart Megens	219	
49	Wim Ubaghs	94	
50	Alberto Blömer	186	
51	Anita Hendriks	225	
52	Job de Graaf	183	
53	Frank Feeburg	212	
54	Serge Ritzen	116	
55	Daniel de Moël	91	
56	Pieter de Boer	167	
57	Jeroen Ahrens	133	
58	Bjorn Roos	149	
59	Stefan Smits	105	
60	Alexander Casteleijn	104	
61	Roel van Bijnen	163	
62	Peter van Valderen	101	
63	Menno de Vries	173	
64	Daryl Pfoster	156	
65	Jorrit Griesen	92	
66	India Zandman	223	
67	Saskia Alberts	187	
68	Kelly Blauw	467	
69	Thijs Klaassen	151	
70	Christian Benerink	98	
71	Ashwin van Stormbroek	211	
72	Natasja Cornelisse	159	
73	Serena Liesveld	161	
74	Nathalie Choenni	422	
75	Ton van Kesteren	168	
76	Ilse Bezaan	125	
77	Rachel Blom	233	
78	Marieke Ehlers	191	
79	Alexander van Hattem	144	
80	Barry Madlener	564	
Total		1,760,966	

== 2: GroenLinks–PvdA ==
Candidate list for GroenLinks-PvdA
Position	Candidate	Votes	Result
1	Frans Timmermans	519,850	Elected, but declined
2	Esmah Lahlah	113,381	Elected
3	Jesse Klaver	107,791	Elected
4	Kati Piri	43,884	Elected
5	Lisa Westerveld	120,186	Elected
6	Marjolein Moorman	156,449	Elected
7	Luc Stultiens	2,250	Elected
8	Habtamu de Hoop	28,605	Elected
9	Laura Bromet	13,370	Elected
10	Sjoukje van Oosterhout	8,894	Elected
11	Julian Bushoff	11,042	Elected
12	Suzanne Kröger	7,541	Elected
13	Mohammed Mohandis	3,466	Elected
14	Mariëtte Patijn	3,404	Elected
15	Ani Zalinyan	5,252	Elected
16	Tom van der Lee	1,223	Elected
17	Songül Mutluer	10,229	Replacement
18	Wimar Bolhuis	1,223	Replacement
19	Geert Gabriëls	5,239	
20	Jimme Nordkamp	2,888	
21	Jade van der Linden	6,753	
22	Floor Roduner	4,215	
23	Daniëlle Hirsch	9,583	
24	Fatihya Abdi	21,613	Elected
25	Mikal Tseggai	18,635	Elected
26	Anita Pijpelink	11,965	
27	Lisa Vliegenthart	24,939	Elected
28	Marco Esser	412	
29	Marleen Haage	3,802	
30	Raoul White	1,852	
31	Iris Vrolijks	5,299	
32	Barbara Kathmann	29,633	Elected
33	Lyle Muns	728	
34	Hayte de Jong	692	
35	Glimina Chakor	5,632	
36	Marcel Vonk	335	
37	Rick van der Zweth	866	
38	Annerijn Vink	2,688	
39	Dennis Tak	1,167	
40	Shadi Nikshomar	2,095	
41	Imran Hyder	620	
42	Lara Sibbing	1,804	
43	Naomi Woltring	2,762	
44	Daan Olivier	468	
45	Tim de Kroon	351	
46	Margreet de Boer	565	
47	Ruben Boomsma	422	
48	Tanja de Jonge	879	
49	Ruchama Bwefar	474	
50	Lotte Jeursen	528	
51	Jan Daenen	539	
52	Fenna Bolding	755	
53	Tamim Mehdi	716	
54	Palwasha Hamzad	3,759	
55	Giovanni Visser	396	
56	Margriet Schreuders	1,275	
57	Milan Bijl	143	
58	Ron Piepers	397	
59	Ties Ammerlaan	132	
60	Willemijn Punte-Zwart	2,461	
61	Hanneke Groenteman	1,469	
62	Erik van Muiswinkel	952	
63	Aafke Romeijn	932	
64	Vincent Bijlo	257	
65	Leonie Jansen	188	
66	Abbie Chalgoum	166	
67	Nynke de Jong	1,554	
68	Thijs Wattimena	463	
69	Emine Ugur	1,553	
70	Jan Smeets	318	
71	Laura Bas	240	
72	Abdeklader Karbache	224	
73	Peter Blom	58	
74	Sharon Gesthuizen	278	
75	Thijs Roovers	119	
76	Agnes Jongerius	542	
77	Ineke van Gent	633	
78	Andrée van Es	442	
79	Jan Pronk	724	
80	Hedy d'Ancona	2,534	
Total		1,352,163	

== 3: People's Party for Freedom and Democracy ==
Candidate list for the People's Party for Freedom and Democracy
Position	Candidate	Votes	Result
1	Dilan Yeşilgöz	691,062	Elected
2	Eelco Heinen	126,213	Elected
3	Ruben Brekelmans	166,730	Elected
4	Vincent Karremans	329,326	Elected
5	Eric van der Burg	22,395	Elected
6	Bente Becker	48,972	Elected
7	Wendy van Eijk	17,324	Elected
8	Silvio Erkens	5,446	Elected
9	Claire Martens	6,552	Elected
10	Jurgen Nobel	2,852	Elected
11	Thom van Campen	4,181	Elected
12	Queeny-Aimée Rajkowski	5,565	Elected
13	Ulysse Ellian	3,033	Elected
14	Thierry Aartsen	3,834	Elected
15	Ingrid Michon-Derkzen	2,514	Elected
16	Peter de Groot	2,049	Elected
17	Harry Bevers	2,353	Elected
18	Renate den Hollander	5,494	Elected
19	Arend Kisteman	1,910	Elected
20	Daan de Kort	4,806	Elected
21	Hilde Wendel	8,021	Elected
22	Björn Schutz	545	Elected
23	Bart Bikkers	764	Replacement
24	Alisha Müller	2,444	Replacement
25	Wim Meulenkamp	3,301	Replacement
26	Martin de Beer	2,209	Replacement
27	Nicole Maes	1,307	Replacement
28	Erik van der Maas	569	Replacement
29	Ruud Verkuijlen	397	Replacement
30	Dieke van Groningen	2,359	Replacement
31	Soler Berk	820	
32	Simone Richardson	1,123	
33	Joost Hoebink	2,018	
34	Martijn Buijsse	1,297	
35	Peter van Kessel	801	
36	Vincent Janssen	298	
37	Denise Eikelenboom	791	
38	Stijn Nijssen	255	
39	Jeroen Hartsuiker	888	
40	Ellis Zeeuw van der Laan	627	
41	Remco Yizhak Cooremans	404	
42	Barry Hoogezand	3,908	
43	Thomas Melisse	444	
44	Angela Huckriede	409	
45	Jeroen van Dijken	231	
46	Mirjam Nelisse	535	
47	Jeroen Verwoort	458	
48	Nupur Kohli	2,182	
49	Kathy Arends-Drijver	618	
50	Marjolein Vulpes	524	
51	Berend Aptroot	476	
52	Daan Vermeulen	327	
53	Friso Versluijs	337	
54	Holger Rodoe	280	
55	Jasper van Os	173	
56	Annemarie Nieuwamerongen-Oosterkamp	318	
57	Rogier Bruin	391	
58	Astrid Ens	507	
59	Christiaan Toussaint	180	
60	Inge Simons	915	
61	Joachim Jansen	133	
62	Anne van Berlo	547	
63	Arend Jan van den Beld	177	
64	Miranda Voogt	401	
65	Rick Zagers	668	
66	Johan Gadella	183	
67	Nathalie de Visser	866	
68	Eddie Altenburg-Collin	404	
69	Daan de Kruijf	648	
70	Martijn van Dalen	247	
71	Sebastiaan Vliegen	287	
72	Jan-Matthijs van Eendenburg	286	
73	Femke Vleij	761	
74	Kathleen van Dijk	508	
75	Pepijn van den Hoogenband	125	
76	Jorin Aardoorn	178	
77	Jan-Willlem Verheij	115	
78	Lily Amani-Ayan	465	
79	Niels van Santen	293	
80	Colin Rijmers	1,475	
Total		1,505,829	

== 4: New Social Contract ==
Candidate list for New Social Contract
Position	Candidate	Votes	Result
1	Eddy van Hijum	22,066	
2	Judith Uitermark	7,149	
3	Merlien Welzijn	2,067	
4	Tjebbe van Oostenbruggen	656	
5	Natascha Wingelaar	1,117	
6	Ilse Saris	1,305	
7	Jurr van Dalen	328	
8	Faith Bruyning	895	
9	Thomas Beukema	330	
10	Simon Geleijnse	97	
11	Willem Koops	211	
12	Vincent Verouden	58	
13	Bram Kouwenhoven	95	
14	Rob Wessels	115	
15	Jan Vredenburg	149	
16	Jamilja van der Meulen	196	
17	Ria de Korte	149	
18	Rinke van der Duim	182	
19	Mireille Louwerens-Huys	115	
20	Quintijn Mauer	138	
21	Inge Mol	375	
22	Patrick Goorhuis	206	
23	Kristan IJkema	50	
24	Luka Bootsma	182	
25	Tatjana Meijvogel-Volk	184	
26	Kevin Hermse	85	
27	Wilhelmina Steijling	43	
28	Jos Roelofs	77	
29	Jos van Ginneken	163	
30	Dirk Gotink	35	
31	Titia Jonkman	111	
32	Colette Kersten	479	
Total		39,408	

== 5: Democrats 66 ==
Candidate list for Democrats 66
Position	Candidate	Votes	Result
1	Rob Jetten	1,209,849	Elected
2	Jan Paternotte	39,801	Elected
3	Hans Vijlbrief	18,215	Elected
4	Anne-Marijke Podt	147,553	Elected
5	Joost Sneller	5,806	Elected
6	Nathalie van Berkel	41,438	Elected
7	Wieke Paulusma	47,800	Elected
8	Fatimazhra Belhirch	14,082	Elected
9	Hanneke van der Werf	43,259	Elected
10	Mpanzu Bamenga	9,121	Elected
11	Felix Klos	1,747	Elected
12	Marijke Synhaeve	16,499	Elected
13	Ilana Rooderkerk	16,299	Elected
14	Robert van Asten	2,055	Elected
15	Ouafa Oualhadj	8,207	Elected
16	Anouschka Biekman	9,544	Elected
17	Renilde Huizenga	9,259	Elected
18	Heera Dijk	6,352	Elected
19	Sarah El Boujdaini	26,775	Elected
20	Henk-Jan Oosterhuis	1,533	Elected
21	Jan Schoonis	875	Elected
22	Koen Castelein	1,284	Elected, but declined
23	Stephan Neijenhuis	1,236	Elected
24	Ulaş Köse	3,479	Elected
25	Marc Vervuurt	3,902	Elected
26	Dion Huidekooper	1,693	Replacement
27	Marieke Vellinga-Beemsterboer	36,576	Elected
28	Robin van Leijen	761	Replacement
29	Michelle Jagtenberg	14,366	Replacement
30	Mahjoub Mathlouti	550	Replacement
31	Lisanne van Damme	10,291	
32	Yared Stifanos	780	
33	Marike Hoekstra	3,670	
34	Hester Borm	3,193	
35	Elke Smulders	4,147	
36	Nes Barkey Wolf	908	
37	Ocker Ghering	885	
38	Elze Woudstra	956	
39	Björn Bonten	1,949	
40	Marloes Derks	2,111	
41	Samantha Regtuijt	1,151	
42	Yvo Senden	383	
43	Jan Teake Pander	427	
44	Thom Berends	538	
45	Remy Maessen	470	
46	Fleur Gräper-van Koolwijk	1,692	
47	Pia Dijkstra	2,762	
48	Kajsa Ollongren	2,163	
49	Robbert Dijkgraaf	5,280	
50	Sandra Phlippen	6,962	
Total		1,790,634	

== 6: Farmer–Citizen Movement ==
Candidate list for the Farmer–Citizen Movement (BBB)
Position	Candidate	Votes	Result
1	Caroline van der Plas	122,624	Elected
2	Mona Keijzer	111,839	Elected
3	Henk Vermeer	3,469	Elected
4	Femke Wiersma	18,903	Elected
5	Claudia van Zanten	1,199	
6	Gijs Tuinman	3,070	
7	Marieke Wijen-Nass	2,763	
8	Agnes Joseph	2,401	
9	Martin Oostenbrink	206	
10	Alexander Hendriks	190	
11	Christine Govaert	928	
12	Robert Tieman	183	
13	Jean Rummenie	320	
14	Eddie van Marum	796	
15	Daniëlle Wiegmans	442	
16	Kilian Karsbergen	122	
17	Erik Den Hertog	175	
18	Ines De Ridder	332	
19	Haidy Hankers	221	
20	Marc Sprik	76	
21	Tjalle Morsink	423	
22	Andrea van Veen	423	
23	Cees Meeldijk	597	
24	Mies Pabon	716	
25	Dirk Buis	349	
26	Jelmer de Groot	325	
27	Joost Olthof	514	
28	Pien Huijbens	263	
29	Kevin Brouwer	95	
30	Folkert Stienstra	303	
31	Bram Berg	122	
32	Ward Meijroos	109	
33	Hans Dekker	218	
34	Monique Flipsen-Verhagen	295	
35	Tjerk Zeitsen	65	
36	Jochem Vrugt	59	
37	Ilona Lagas	195	
38	Mark Van de Ven	252	
39	Harold Zoet	688	
40	Annetje Schoolmeesters	222	
41	Robbert Lievense	115	
42	Harry Schuiling	222	
43	Kor Hoving	1,311	
44	André Adolfs	269	
45	Ingrid de Sain	170	
46	Abel Kooistra	193	
47	Jelle Beemsterboer	243	
48	Nicole Koks	262	
49	Helma Lodders	350	
50	Nicki Pouw-Verweij	397	
Total		279,916	

== 7: Christian Democratic Appeal ==
Candidate list for the Christian Democratic Appeal
Position	Candidate	Votes	Result
1	Henri Bontenbal	1,002,389	Elected
2	Hanneke Steen	84,082	Elected
3	Derk Boswijk	7,157	Elected
4	Inge van Dijk	27,262	Elected
5	Harmen Krul	4,002	Elected
6	Jeltje Straatman	12,656	Elected
7	Bart van den Brink	3,205	Elected
8	Judith Bühler	17,075	Elected
9	Henk Jumelet	6,980	Elected
10	Elles van Ark	3,199	Elected
11	Tijs van den Brink	4,888	Elected
12	Jantine Zwinkels	4,443	Elected
13	Maes van Lanschot	2,483	Elected
14	Luciënne Boelsma-Hoekstra	7,282	Elected
15	Jan Arie Koorevaar	2,498	Elected
16	Eveline Tijmstra	2,795	Elected
17	Sarath Hamstra	1,780	Elected
18	Etkin Armut	5,629	Elected
19	André Poortman	1,641	Replacement
20	Joris Lohman	797	Replacement
21	Chantal van den Berg	6,240	
22	Marcel Hanegraaff	3,136	
23	Karsten Klein	873	
24	Marieke van der Spek	5,194	
25	Arjan Tolkamp	4,320	
26	Hemin Hawezy	2,227	
27	Ankie de Hoon	3,291	
28	Johanna de Vries	900	
29	Stefan Mastenbroek	856	
30	Josine Heijnen	1,904	
31	Jacob Boonstra	768	
32	Caroline van Brakel	1,044	
33	Ivora Noort	1,319	
34	Sjoerd Wijnsma	1,067	
35	Daisy Vliegenthart-Goedhart	1,014	
36	Dani Bracke	1601	
37	Yusuf Tuncer	331	
38	René Vrugt	331	
39	Steven van Die	255	
40	Matthijs Buijs	276	
41	Jacky Silos	459	
42	Erik Drenth	460	
43	Paul Boogaard	290	
44	Elske van der Mik	770	
45	Hubert Schokker	156	
46	Willemien Wever	857	
47	Stijn Sips	814	
48	Luc van Dijk-Wijmenga	455	
49	Gregor Rossen	390	
50	Gregory Sedoc	3,033	
Total		1,246,874	

== 8: Socialist Party ==
Candidate list for the Socialist Party
Position	Candidate	Votes	Result
1	Jimmy Dijk	117,476	Elected
2	Sandra Beckerman	36,765	Elected
3	Sarah Dobbe	12,554	Elected
4	Bastiaan Meijer	1,239	
5	Maurits Hondmann	1,247	
6	Gerrie Elfrink	1,008	
7	Sebastiaan van den Hout	428	
8	Sunita Biharie	6,340	
9	Stephanie Blom	4,314	
10	Ruud Kuin	474	
11	Leroy Vossenberg	834	
12	Anne Cramer	1,295	
13	Amber Witsenburg	1,488	
14	Erica Wever	656	
15	Mathijs ten Broeke	438	
16	Thomas van Halm	262	
17	Steven Peltenburg	179	
18	Lieke van Rossum	1,005	
19	Madeleine Boer	473	
20	Mustapha Eaisaouiyen	493	
21	Joost van der Sluis	125	
22	Sandra Drost	983	
23	Sam Schwarz	386	
24	Ruud Merks	399	
25	Michel van Winden	74	
26	Inge Verdaasdonk	909	
27	Dane Harris	157	
28	Dani Smith	158	
29	Edith Kuitert	359	
30	Hanneke Goede	666	
31	Erik Schapendonk	311	
32	Xander Topma	157	
33	Jorge Wolters Gregório	285	
34	Anna Moriarty Linthorst	447	
35	Angelo Alessandro Delsen	157	
36	Emin Başoğlu	503	
37	Ruth de Klein	110	
38	Anne-Marie Mineur	252	
39	Yurre Wieken	317	
40	Jaswinder Singh	1,396	
41	Jente van Eck	379	
42	Lisanne Zandvliet-Oldenkamp	351	
43	Wim Hoogervorst	129	
44	Iris van de Kolk	343	
45	Thom Smit	117	
46	Erik Flentge	46	
47	Robert Bos	111	
48	Theo Coşkun	162	
49	Remine Alberts	199	
50	Remi Poppe	629	

== 9: Denk ==
Candidate list for the Denk
Position	Candidate	Votes	Result
1	Stephan van Baarle	156,427	Elected
2	Doğukan Ergin	20,180	Elected
3	Ismail el Abassi	23,236	Elected
4	Elif Esen	8,401	
5	Nassira Abaâziz	5,724	
6	Nur Icar	4,074	
7	Elika Rehim Zadeh	1,070	
8	Ibrahim Ghazi	1,676	
9	Sabina Alieva	1,233	
10	Orlando Hellings	594	
11	Ayse Tekin	2,207	
12	Ahmet Kaya	2,155	
13	Şeyda Kuzey	548	
14	Ramazan Özcan	981	
15	Timotheus Tap	250	
16	Emma Manhoef	703	
17	Sheher Khan	1,038	
18	Furkan Kondu	352	
19	Stephan Kuipers	464	
20	Aysel Ağirbaş	453	
21	Melehat Heybeli	284	
22	Adeel Mahmood	1,593	
23	Majda Sakim	243	
24	Iliaas Abdoelrahman	1,239	
25	Esra Al Mansoury	582	
26	Anissa Amraoui	767	
27	Ranim Agha	182	
28	Mustafa Bal	1,193	
29	Zainab Abubaker	617	
30	Burhan Aydin	757	
31	Esraa Aboelkasem	338	
32	Emin Ayverdi	418	
33	Lamba Neshan	143	
34	Gürkan Gökmen	535	
35	Mohamed El Majjaoui	1,295	
36	Omar Fkihi	334	
37	Hakan Ünal	312	
38	Naoufal Akhatab	245	
39	Selim Özçelik	663	
40	Can Bayrakci	723	
41	Mustafa Kocabiyik	1,155	
42	Achraf el Ghaddari	385	
43	Beytullah Çelik	738	
44	Beril Tacirlioğlu	173	
45	Anouar Yacoubi	269	
46	Erdoğan Şahin	291	
47	Jamal Moussane	203	
48	Yusuf Dağdelen	1,047	
49	Tahsin Bülbül	924	
50	Faouzi Achbar	954	

== 10: Party for the Animals ==
Candidate list for the Party for the Animals
Position	Candidate	Votes	Result
1	Esther Ouwehand	134,446	Elected
2	Ines Kostić	22,301	Elected
3	Christine Teunissen	9,793	Elected
4	Falco van Hassel	2,124	
5	Debbie Mathijssen	7,533	
6	Kjell van Wijlandt	728	
7	Anna Krijger	10,674	
8	Martine van Schaik	1,791	
9	Willemijn Stoffels	1,936	
10	Pinar Coşkun	4,492	
11	Anjo Travaille	418	
12	Freek Bersch	419	
13	Ronan van Langen	2,017	
14	Pieter Groenewege	346	
15	Merel Muller	2,610	
16	Robert Barker	206	
17	Olivia Butterman	1,194	
18	Yuri Zandwijken	290	
19	Jildert Huitema	266	
20	Cynthia Pallandt	1,786	
21	Stella Pieterson	564	
22	Ana Karadarević	878	
23	Nayra van Lubek	539	
24	Jacqueline van den Broek	492	
25	Danielle van den Weerd	376	
26	Gaby Markandu	1,515	
27	Win Scheijde	327	
28	Eline Lauret	911	
29	Anne-Miep Vlasveld	532	
30	Noï van Mondfrans	308	
31	Navid Madani	132	
32	Pam Wijnans	258	
33	Yeattem Wong	620	
34	Janneke van Lierop	315	
35	Arjan Groters	136	
36	Anne Johan Woudstra	267	
37	Vania Nasroen	781	
38	Jasper van Loo	117	
39	Tim van der Toorn	230	
40	Judith Lammers	644	
41	Peter Lievense	222	
42	Ceyhun Eroglu	387	
43	Angélique Voskamp	268	
44	Virgina Jonkers	217	
45	Janneke Schotveld	206	
46	Jesse Luijendijk	115	
47	Eva van Esch	522	
48	Frank Wassenberg	521	
49	Ria Strik	669	
50	Lizzy van Coevorden	932	

== 11: Forum for Democracy ==
Candidate list for the Forum for Democracy
Position	Candidate	Votes	Result
1	Lidewij de Vos	427,882	Elected
2	Thierry Baudet	22,032	Elected
3	Gideon van Meijeren	18,870	Elected
4	Frederik Jansen	800	Elected
5	Ralf Dekker	1,462	Elected
6	Pepijn van Houwelingen	3,133	Elected
7	Peter van Duyvenvoorde	292	Elected
8	Tom Russcher	116	Replacement
9	Massimo Etalle	103	
10	Milan Schenk	200	Replacement
11	Iem al Biyati	565	Replacement
12	Andreas Bakir	412	
13	Ramon van Asch	125	
14	Nicolas Knoester	158	
15	Pelle Koopman	90	
16	Brigitte Antolini	379	
17	Esther Hendriksen	221	
18	Brent Hadderingh	98	
19	Tommy Panis	148	
20	Vincent Vos	356	
21	Fouad El Masoudi	161	
22	Marco van den Boomgaard	73	
23	Marianne Akkermans	263	
24	Luca de Clippelaar	73	
25	Moriah Hartman	105	
26	Jelle Wittebrood	78	
27	Jasper van der Voort	71	
28	Peter Vermaas	49	
29	Yvonne de Graaf	84	
30	Maxim de Lange	114	
31	Kai Burgemeester	68	
32	Patty Spoek	97	
33	Cirano van Haarlem	19	
34	Yolande Boom	73	
35	Claire Middelkoop	123	
36	Jelena Postuma	153	
37	Elisabeth de Heer	129	
38	Remco Roelofs	80	
39	Theo Heller	41	
40	Tibor Wouda	81	
41	Peter Verstegen	39	
42	Johan Dessing	21	
43	Machiel de Graaf	54	
44	Chris Meijdam	134	
45	Pim van Rijswijk	370	
46	Hans van de Breevaart	105	
47	Bas Filippini	41	
48	Anton van Schijndel	27	
49	Leroy Alberts	32	
50	Joris van den Oetelaar	193	

== 12: Reformed Political Party ==
Candidate list for the Reformed Political Party
Position	Candidate	Votes	Result
1	Chris Stoffer	210,929	Elected
2	Diederik van Dijk	4,932	Elected
3	André Flach	6,337	Elected
4	Nathanaël Middelkoop	2,522	
5	Wouter-Jan Vroegindeweij	1,783	
6	Harry van der Maas	803	
7	Henk van der Wind	702	
8	Dick Both	426	
9	Jan Kloosterman	423	
10	Johan Roodnat	649	
11	Adriaan van der Wulp	302	
12	Harm Jan Polinder	489	
13	Maarten Slingerland	338	
14	Wim van Duijn	204	
15	Leo Barth	217	
16	Johnny Lukasse	249	
17	Hans Tanis	165	
18	Ewart Bosma	497	
19	Geert Schipaanboord	239	
20	Arnold Versteeg	398	
21	Jan Hartog	131	
22	Tom Koekoek	430	
23	Leendert de Knegt	303	
24	Gert van Leeuwen	211	
25	Berend de Boer	246	
26	Wim Kok	178	
27	Jan Kuijers	195	
28	Henk van Zelst	184	
29	Rob Bource	75	
30	Lubbert Talen	149	
31	Jan Baijense	194	
32	Henk Bulten	116	
33	Jan Top	221	
34	Lambert Kisteman	79	
35	Lourens Bruchem	122	
36	Bertrick v.d. Dikkenberg	87	
37	Hendrik Herweijer	121	
38	Gert van Laar	118	
39	André Scheppink	148	
40	Ruben van Heteren	108	
41	Bernard van den Belt	162	
42	Daniël van Iwaarden	178	
43	Jan-Bert Heinen	139	
44	Willem-Jan Verdoes	225	
45	Jan Lock	54	
46	Joan van Burg	135	
47	Kees Vermaat	411	
48	Leendert van Tuijl	94	
49	Gerbrand van Hoef	172	
50	Florian Pronk	503	

== 13: Christian Union ==
Candidate list for the Christian Union (CU)
Position	Candidate	Votes	Result
1	Mirjam Bikker	157,021	Elected
2	Pieter Grinwis	4,187	Elected
3	Don Ceder	15,405	Elected
4	Alwin te Rietstap	2,608	
5	Joëlle Gooijer-Medema	3,974	
6	Nico Drost	803	
7	Carlijn Niesink	1,379	
8	Wouter de Reus	398	
9	Cora Otter-van den Bosch	649	
10	Tobias Holtman	311	
11	Inge Jongman-Mollema	957	
12	Maarten van Ooijen	349	
13	Harmjan Vedder	492	
14	Christian van der Krift	317	
15	Judith Westerink-Petersen	415	
16	Hetty Egger-van Oppen	202	
17	Roos Jonkheer-Vos	370	
18	Gaetan Mbwete	742	
19	Harmke Vlieg-Kempe	347	
20	Mark Treurniet	256	
21	Willemien Treurniet-Klapwijk	276	
22	Jennifer Elskamp-Hofstede	317	
23	Robert de Heer	353	
24	Henco Cecilia	662	
25	Auke Pasterkamp	213	
26	Francis van der Mooren	171	
27	Ruben van de Belt	240	
28	Nathalie Nede	259	
29	Ad de Boer	111	
30	Wim Voskamp	45	
31	Jaco van Hoorn	131	
32	Matthijs de Vries	132	
33	Alma Broekmaat-Hagens	187	
34	Sitsofe Quarshie	421	
35	Marcel Koning	246	
36	Ed Bosma	109	
37	Gerard Stoop	51	
38	Twan Moes	111	
39	Dianne Hoefakker	139	
40	Jeroen Westendorp	103	
41-45	Local candidates		
46	Gerald Troost	292	
47	Elbert Smelt	699	
48	Cees Dekker	95	
49	Jurjen ten Brinke	640	
50	Beatrice de Graaf	1,403	

=== Regional candidates (CU) ===
==== Groningen ====
Regional candidates in Groningen
Position	Candidate	Votes	Result
41	Jan Peter van der Sluis	4	
42	Niels Joostens	27	
43	Jewan de Goede	51	
44	Koos Siegers	49	
45	Peter Rebergen	22	

==== Leeuwarden ====
Regional candidates in Leeuwarden
Position	Candidate	Votes	Result
41	Jan Peter van der Sluis	0	
42	Maikel La Rose	5	
43	Elizabeth Bronkhorst-van Poortvliet	2	
44	Lysbeth Vellinga-Zeilstra	95	
45	Pieter van der Zwan	129	

==== Assen ====
Regional candidates in Assen
Position	Candidate	Votes	Result
41	Jan Peter van der Sluis	1	
42	Maikel La Rose	1	
43	Henny van den Born	17	
44	Roy Pruisscher	61	
45	Bouke Weening	42	

==== Zwolle ====
Regional candidates in Zwolle
Position	Candidate	Votes	Result
41	Jan Peter van der Sluis	128	
42	Maikel La Rose	3	
43	Elizabeth Bronkhorst-van Poortvliet	7	
44	Jan Carlo Bos	82	
45	Frederike Hulshof-Boeve	97	

==== Lelystad ====
Regional candidates in Lelystad
Position	Candidate	Votes	Result
41	Jan Peter van der Sluis	3	
42	Maikel La Rose	3	
43	Pieter Frankema	40	
44	Gerard den Bakker	40	
45	Hans van Dijk	36	

==== Nijmegen ====
Regional candidates in Nijmegen
Position	Candidate	Votes	Result
41	Jan Peter van der Sluis	1	
42	Maikel La Rose	0	
43	Kees van der Zaag	19	
44	Enrico Roseboom	67	
45	Piet Jan den Dikken	37	

==== Arnhem ====
Regional candidates in Arnhem
Position	Candidate	Votes	Result
41	Jan Peter van der Sluis	2	
42	Maikel La Rose	5	
43	Geerco André	57	
44	Nelleke Hegeman-Mekking	70	
45	Joël Verstoep	99	

==== Utrecht ====
Regional candidates in Utrecht
Position	Candidate	Votes	Result
41	Jan Peter van der Sluis	5	
42	Maikel La Rose	11	
43	Elizabeth Bronkhorst-van Poortvliet	48	
44	Thijs Scherrenburg	60	
45	Sanny Brunekreeft-Lagerweij	80	

==== Amsterdam ====
Regional candidates in Amsterdam
Position	Candidate	Votes	Result
41	Jan Peter van der Sluis	1	
42	Maikel La Rose	3	
43	Elizabeth Bronkhorst-van Poortvliet	0	
44	Thijs Scherrenburg	0	
45	Marcel Vercammen	0	

==== Haarlem ====
Regional candidates in Haarlem
Position	Candidate	Votes	Result
41	Jan Peter van der Sluis	1	
42	Maikel La Rose	1	
43	Elizabeth Bronkhorst-van Poortvliet	3	
44	Frank Visser	53	
45	Bas Nanninga	56	

==== Den Helder ====
Regional candidates in Den Helder
Position	Candidate	Votes	Result
41	Jan Peter van der Sluis	1	
42	Maikel La Rose	2	
43	Fred Ruiten	44	
44	Ronald van Veen	38	
45	Sietse Oppenhuizen	71	

==== The Hague, Maastricht, Bonaire ====
Regional candidates in The Hague, Maastricht and Bonaire
Position	Candidate	Votes	Result
41	Jan Peter van der Sluis	1	
42	Maikel La Rose	6	
43	Elizabeth Bronkhorst-van Poortvliet	5	
44	Thijs Scherrenburg	2	
45	Marcel Vercammen	0	

==== Rotterdam ====
Regional candidates in Rotterdam
Position	Candidate	Votes	Result
41	Gerben van Dijk	32	
42	Maikel La Rose	59	
43	Jane Hiwat	104	
44	Mark-Peter Amoureus	21	
45	Tjalling Vonk	22	

==== Dordrecht ====
Regional candidates in Dordrecht
Position	Candidate	Votes	Result
41	Jan Peter van der Sluis	2	
42	Maikel La Rose	38	
43	Elizabeth Bronkhorst-van Poortvliet	35	
44	Alice Bouman-de Groot	70	
45	Jan Pieter Verweij	49	

==== Leiden ====
Regional candidates in Leiden
Position	Candidate	Votes	Result
41	Jan Peter van der Sluis	2	
42	Maikel La Rose	13	
43	Elizabeth Bronkhorst-van Poortvliet	7	
44	Anna van Popering-Kalkman	43	
45	Robin Versluis	24	

==== Middelburg ====
Regional candidates in Middelburg
Position	Candidate	Votes	Result
41	Pieter Jan Mersie	25	
42	Henk Eerkes	42	
43	Priscilla Vrolijk-van der Feen	56	
44	Gerard Verkuil	46	
45	Marcel Vercammen	71	

==== Tilburg ====
Regional candidates in The Hague
Position	Candidate	Votes	Result
41	Jan Peter van der Sluis	0	
42	Maikel La Rose	2	
43	Jan van Groos	29	
44	Nelleke Tolenaars-den Braber	53	
45	Anne Duizer	55	

==== 's-Hertogenbosch ====
Regional candidates in 's-Hertogenbosch
Position	Candidate	Votes	Result
41	Jan Peter van der Sluis	0	
42	Maikel La Rose	2	
43	Elizabeth Bronkhorst-van Poortvliet	2	
44	Wouter Bondt	33	
45	Henk Jager	42	

== 14: Volt Netherlands ==
Candidate list for the Volt Netherlands
Position	Candidate	Votes	Result
1	Laurens Dassen	55,089	Elected
2	Marieke Koekkoek	30,132	
3	Rens de Boer	1,340	
4	Simone Ritzer	9,914	
5	Bjorn Beijnon	1,550	
6	Laura Harks	3,116	
7	Jeroen Princen	433	
8	Inge Vossen-van Beers	1,240	
9	Emre Gungor	727	
10	Anna Veltkamp	955	
11	Erik Kemp	1,400	
12	Monique Fikenscher	1,170	
13	Roel Yska	295	
14	Mette Blom	486	
15	Geert van der Veer	130	
16	Anne van den Ende	607	
17	Michael Teng-Li Tai	219	
18	Karin Nielsen	566	
19	Jesse van Mulkom	467	
20	Jefte Erens	446	
21	Wiebe van den Ende	94	
22	Jolijn van der Linden	849	
23	Matthijs Nieuwenhuis	258	
24	Novella Rasenberg	1,053	
25	Tim Areago	133	
26	Annemieke van der Linden	225	
27	Leslie Scherbeijn	231	
28	Laura van Strien	188	
29	Tom van Doesburg	99	
30	Marion van Kempen	107	
31	Sjoerd Wennekes	138	
32	Lore Eckelmans	994	
33	Christiaan Meinsma	56	
34	Julia Hamel	147	
35	Daan Stokvis	150	
36	Tris Westerman	285	
37	Quinten Buijs	60	
38	Iris van der Veldt	316	
39	Mark Croes	78	
40	Vivienne van der Veen	270	
41	Giovanni Hagen	114	
42	Adda van Zanden	164	
43	Bart Klijnsma	177	

== 15: JA21 ==
Candidate list for the JA21
Position	Candidate	Votes	Result
1	Joost Eerdmans	420,505	Elected
2	Annabel Nanninga	66,552	Elected
3	Ingrid Coenradie	102,407	Elected
4	Michiel Hoogeveen	1,543	Elected
5	Simon Ceulemans	598	Elected
6	Diederik Boomsma	3,591	Elected
7	Daniël van den Berg	1,011	Elected
8	Maarten Goudzwaard	1,842	Elected
9	Ranjith Clemminck-Croci	750	Elected
10	Michel van Elck	395	
11	Philippe Schyns	2,110	
12	Geert Koster	305	
13	Stijn Hesselink	2,451	
14	Ivo Mantel	885	
15	Cynthia Gordijn	5,448	
16	Matthias Jager	1,096	
17	Floor van Scherpenzeel	4,133	
18	Ronald Dijksterhuis	541	
19	Kevin Nuijten	469	
20	Thom van Vugt	256	
21	Leon Baten	202	
22	Stijn van Ede	298	
23	Ruben Laurijssens	79	
24	Melissa Hoogerwerf	1,186	
25	Roy de Bruin	832	
26	Roman Determan	105	
27	Pauline de Bres	582	
28	Gert Heijkoop	319	
29	Nawin Ramcharan	845	
30	Frans van Zaalen	141	
31	Jaimy Meyer	565	
32	Maike Manon Damen-Flobbe	803	
33	Servaas Roos	312	
34	Denis Lens van Rijn	79	
35	Paul Chung	394	
36	Hans Kövi	75	
37	Mees Uijens	917	
38	Nima Hakim	367	
39	Arthur van Geest	102	
40	Philip Drent	416	
41	Ian Patrick Meere	126	
42	Marnix van den Berk	321	
43	Artak Avdaljan	264	
44	Jens Ernst	559	
45	Marco Pastors	220	
46	Simon Fortuyn	1,520	

== 16: Peace for Animals ==
Candidate list for the Peace for Animals
Position	Candidate	Votes	Result
1	Pascale Plusquin	9,755	
2	Kees Klomp	722	
3	Ruud van der Velden	1,123	
4	Arabella Burgers	1,084	
5	Ewald Engelen	306	
6	Harry Voss	392	
7	Anne Hanssen	399	
8	Rosanna Huertas Mulckhuyse	218	
9	Belle Fazel	149	
10	Lara Klaassen	157	
11	Simone Broekman-Falcão Pereira Gomes	245	
12	Martijntje Smits	177	
13	Cindy Wever	60	
14	Paul Savelkouls	49	
15	Mattheus Bleijenberg	56	
16	Olivia van Tergouw	228	
17	Hennie Stevens	82	
18	Judith Kochen	106	
19	Aad van der Waal	38	
20	Ineke van den Abeele	52	
21	Bob Hagen	36	
22	Norma Miedema	411	
23	Monique Schouten	98	
24	Jurgen Suurmeijer	42	
25	Annemarie van Gelder	74	
26	Hans Bok	69	
27	Jeroen Koedam	31	
28	Theo van den Elsen	54	
29	Myrna van de Laar	46	
30	Rita Holtslag	72	
31	Henk Baars	53	
32	Belinda Meuldijk	229	
33	Hans Bouma	206	

== 17: Interest of the Netherlands ==
Candidate list for the Interest of the Netherlands
Position	Candidate	Votes	Result
1	Wybren van Haga	12,967	
2	Dorien Rookmaker	1,553	
3	Harm Beertema	189	
4	Theo Schetters	595	
5	René Dercksen	70	
6	Vala van den Boomen	333	
7	Geert Dales	75	
8	Ab Flipse	589	
9	Toine Manders	335	
10	Hennie van Schaik	83	
11	Erwin Versteeg	73	
12	Stefanie Vulders	150	
13	Patrick Schilder	53	
14	Meike Terhorst	95	
15	Mark Bos	116	
16	Johan Kosters	40	
17	Marcus Rolloos	81	
18	Willy Verweij	30	
19	Peter Mul	37	
20	Rubert Remijn	32	
21	Charlotte Marie Mensing	67	
22	Gerard van Erp	25	
23	Iwan Dienjes	32	
24	Jaimi Keirouz	88	
25	Arjen Schuiling	39	
26	Yannick Rietman	38	
27	Rubert Remijn	41	
28	Elaine Toes	51	
29	Ingmar Elferink	22	
30	Jan Boomsma	36	
31	Yasmina Jimenez	41	
32	Sjef Siemons	19	
33	Noël van Keeken	13	
34	Pieter Eggermont	13	
35	Cees Freeke	22	
36	Johan van Leeuwen	16	
37	Dirk Moes	26	
38	Jan Pieter Verhoog	14	
39	Ko Vos	32	
40	Meïr Villegas Henriquez	15	
41	Paul Bohte	14	
42	Bauke Westphal	16	
43	Leon Geurts	24	
44	Wim Huisman	24	
45	Yalda Qadiri	20	
46	Laurentius van den Bolsem	10	
47	Ramon Koeleman	29	
48	Murat Yurekli	71	
49	Patrick Kicken	60	
50	Roy van Aalst	63	

== 18: BIJ1 ==
Candidate list for BIJ1
Position	Candidate	Votes	Result
1	Tofik Dibi	14,273	
2	Naomi Tuininga	14,689	
3	Teun Otte	931	
4	Precious Sadhoe	1,696	
5	Marchiano van Campenhout	191	
6	Mika Beau Dalderop	668	
7	Noura Oul Fakir	1,589	
8	Soheila Najand	591	
9	Carolien Nieuweboer	993	
10	Venus Bijleveld	792	
11	Nathan Miango	169	
12	Marie-Louise Beekmans	339	
13	Tikhoe Isaack	81	
14	Gül Streutker	243	
15	Yuval Gal	170	
16	Yvette Luhrs	271	
17	Joanna Rijsdam	346	
18	Andre Damian	219	
19	Chihiro Geuzebroek	284	
20	Stevie Nolten	539	
21	Vayhishta Miskin	489	
22	Glenn Helberg	797	

== 19: Libertarian Party ==
Candidate list for the Libertarian Party
Position	Candidate	Votes	Result
1	Tom van Lamoen	3,505	
2	Hester Bais	3,162	
3	Rico Brouwer	107	
4	Frederique Durlacher	158	
5	Aaron Winters	64	
6	Esra van Beelen	124	
7	Peter van der Helm	135	
8	Roald Schoenmakers	43	
9	Tilian Honig	77	
10	Pieter Visser	68	
11	Martin de Haan	33	
12	Jip Meijer	24	
13	Quintus Backhuijs	51	
14	Ruud van Dijk	35	
15	Peter Hartkamp	35	
16	Ancilla van de Leest	467	
17	Marcel Crok	160	

== 20: 50PLUS ==
Candidate list for the 50PLUS
Position	Candidate	Votes	Result
1	Jan Struijs	110,005	Elected
2	Corrie van Brenk	15,635	Elected
3	Martine Baay	3,299	
4	Henk van Tilborg	1,720	
5	Ruud van Acquoy	956	
6	Wilma Berkhout	2,440	
7	Anne Marie Fischer	2,296	
8	Anneke van der Helm	1,436	
9	Anton van Straten	414	
10	Bennie van Est	952	
11	Alfons Leerkes	136	
12	Jaap Engel	446	
13	Jan Frans Brouwers	245	
14	Jan van de Starre	525	
15	Marita van Lierop	594	
16	Marinus Kasteleijn	978	
17	Mieke Hoek	354	
18	Adriana Hernandez	572	
19	Chris Veeze	379	
20	Herman Nota	554	
21	Nico de Vos	318	
22	Jolanda van den Boogaard	497	
23	John van Loon	188	
24	Sjanie Donker	627	
25	Edmond van Ooijen	123	
26	Klaas Hamersma	400	
27	Ab Wissingh	256	
28	Frank de Kruif	203	
29	Cor Verbeek	215	
30	Jan van Gorkum	584	
31	Frans Erkamp	167	
32	Willem Willemse	192	
33	Willem Bakx	106	
34	Andre Verschoor	166	
35	Peter Jong	292	
36	Emiel Sjaardema	134	
37	Geert Tomlow	125	
38	Joke Bouwmeester	223	
39	Louis van Houtert	102	
40	Jan van Hoek	98	
41	Agnes Timmers	294	
42	Annemiek Guldemond	314	
43	Joost Boetes	174	
44	Henk Denissen	95	
45	Robert Biever	37	
46	Henk van Elst	46	
47	Marc van Rooij	140	
48	Gerrit Jan van Otterloo	106	
49	Willem Dekker	96	
50	Martin van Rooijen	799	

== 21: Pirate Party ==
Candidate list for the Pirate Party
Position	Candidate	Votes	Result
1	Matthijs Pontier	5,499	
2	Kirsten Zimmerman	1,668	
3	Arjan Bresser	304	
4	Saira Sadloe	424	
5	Wietze Brandsma	148	
6	Goof Pontier	139	
7	David van Deijk	217	
8	Sabrina Grossman	146	
9	Eskild Wikkeling	50	
10	Fleur Bergman	269	
11	Mark van Treuren	78	
12	Mirjam van Rijn	116	
13	Jean-Aimé Musangamfura	51	
14	Dmitri Schrama	69	
15	Dylan Hallegraeff	88	
16	Bianca Lubben	86	
17	Kees Valkhof	61	
18	Peter Braun	60	
19	Nabille El Hajoui	46	
20	Teunis van Nes	53	
21	Fanni Horvath	89	
22	Wouter van Dijke	64	
23	Angeline Pot	113	
24	Edy Bouma	53	
25	Frank Wijnans	50	
26	Ron Smit	22	
27	Aloy Nauta	37	
28	Ryszard Matenko	12	
29	Roberto Haak	132	
30	André Linnenbank	44	
31	Vincent van der Velde	76	
32	Jaap baron van Til	89	
33	Metje Blaak	222	

== 22: Frisian National Party ==
Candidate list for the Frisian National Party
Position	Candidate	Votes	Result
1	Aant Jelle Soepboer	6,279	
2	Durk Krol	124	
3	Japke van Groning	654	
4	Aimée van der Ham	253	
5	Roy Luca	51	
6	Geke Kiers	106	
7	Ate Bouma	52	
8	Britte van Die	107	
9	Fasil Kuipers	49	
10	Tsjeard Hofstra	53	
11	Klaas Fokkinga	25	
12	Colin Klingestijn	112	
13	Sita Land-Dotinga	97	
14	Jacob Wijnsma	33	
15	Theun Wiersma	26	
16	Nils van Mourik	14	
17	Dinie Visser	175	
18	Peter Boomsma	22	
19	Willem Wouda	11	
20	Tieme Heeringa	17	
21	Marco Hoekstra	32	
22	Foppe Land	148	
23	Thom Feddema	28	
24	Tjitte Hemstra	42	
25	Libbe Kees Talma	11	
26	Dave Herms	11	
27	Andries de Boer	17	
28	Astrid de Deugd	25	
29	Pieter van Althuis	15	
30	Age de Jong	16	
31	Bert Vollema	15	
32	Nynke Hinke Rintjema	70	
33	Dieke van der Pol	26	
34	Alette Kleefstra	25	
35	Trijntje Albada	49	
36	Ultsje Hosper	25	
37	Corrie Bergstra-Veldhuis	47	
38	Sannah Debreczeni	23	
39	Bouwina van Dellen	41	
40	Frank de Boer	13	
41	Henk de Boer	33	
42	Tjibbe Brinkman	38	
43	Jan Dijkstra	17	
44	Durk Durksz	43	
45	Sytze Brouwer	82	
46	Harmen Brouwer	42	
47	Hindrik van der Meer	14	
48	Sijbe Knol	29	
49	Sybren Singelsma	94	

== 23: Vrij Verbond ==
Candidate list for Vrij Verbond
Position	Candidate	Votes	Result
1	Bart Burggraaf	551	
2	Mario Voorbij	54	
3	Johan Zijlstra	37	
4	Carin Tawfik	116	
5	Nando Jansen	17	
6	Wendy Struijk	82	
7	Irene van der Marel	50	
8	Antoon Huigens	13	
9	Cees Schaap	26	
10	Rik Kleinsmit	15	
11	Marc Roodveldt	14	
12	Pallieter Koopmans	73	

== 24: De Linie ==
Candidate list for De Linie
Position	Candidate	Votes	Result
1	Gerard van Hooft	1,829	
2	Jojo Mulder	567	
3	Presley Bergen	104	
4	Tineke Bulder	142	
5	George Peeters	95	
6	Wytse van der Veen	65	
7	John Voets	37	
8	Selda Bozkurt	171	
9	Steven Gielisse	68	
10	Ria Derks van de Ven	47	
11	Ad Kastelijn	46	
12	Bas Klasen	47	
13	Corinne Roos	76	
14	Denis Wood	17	
15	Petra Kastelijn	167	

== 25: Nederland met een PLAN ==
Candidate list for Nederland met een PLAN
Position	Candidate	Votes	Result
1	Kok Chan	2,299	

== 26: Ellect ==
Candidate list for Ellect
Position	Candidate	Votes	Result
1	Joana Amoah	115	
2	Esther Morisson	19	
3	Eddie de Sera	8	
4	Katia Rodrigues de Souza	11	
5	Ferdinand Anthonij de Jongh	6	
6	Ruthsela Regalda Ustasia	3	
7	Margo Celestine van Rhemen	4	
8	Maria Joanna Petronella Vinken	39	

== 27: Partij voor de Rechtsstaat ==
Candidate list for the Partij voor de Rechtsstaat
Position	Candidate	Votes	Result
1	Danielle Tulp	56	
2	Kimberley Fer	1	
3	Remy Leurs	1	
4	Funda Ileri	6	
5	Mehmet Sagsu	2	
6	Clyde Walker	5	
7	Wilfred Zielman	3	
8	Gymaine Inen	0	
9	Miranda Damkat	3	
10	Latoya Hallatu	2	
11	Abd Alfarrah	2	
12	Gerben de Vos	2	
13	Edmee Verstraten	2	
14	Fawzia Dhahar	6	
15	Moray Juffermans	1	
16	Bnar Gurdji	2	
17	Jan Krijger	2	
18	Alexander van der Velden	5	
19	Nathalie Sijbesma	6	
20	Mirurgia Breinburg	26	
21	Elias Schreuder	2	
22	Annemarie Schaacke	16	

== See also ==
- List of members of the House of Representatives of the Netherlands, 2025–present

== Sources ==
- Kiesraad (7 November 2025a). "Proces-verbaal van de uitslag van de verkiezing van de Tweede Kamer 2025 d.d. 7 november 2025" (PDF) (in Dutch).
