= List of members of the House of Representatives of the Netherlands for the Christian Democratic Appeal =

This is a list of all members of the House of Representatives of the Netherlands for Christian Democratic Appeal (CDA).

== List ==
Name	Start of term	End of term	Ref.
Wim Aantjes	8 June 1977 (Note: Was previously member of the House of Representatives for the ARP.)	6 November 1978	
Harry Aarts	8 June 1977 (Note: Was previously member of the House of Representatives for the KVP.)	30 September 1993	
Ine Aasted-Madsen-van Stiphout	23 May 2002	29 January 2003	
Ine Aasted-Madsen-van Stiphout	21 May 2003	29 November 2006	
Ine Aasted-Madsen-van Stiphout	13 May 2008	16 August 2008	
Ine Aasted-Madsen-van Stiphout	3 September 2008	16 June 2010	
Dries van Agt	8 June 1977	18 December 1977	
Dries van Agt	10 June 1981	8 September 1981	
Dries van Agt	16 September 1982	15 June 1983	
Hans van den Akker	19 May 1998	22 May 2002	
Rendert Algra	26 July 2002	29 November 2006	
Rendert Algra	1 September 2009	16 June 2010	
Marius van Amelsvoort	15 September 1977	15 April 1980	
Marius van Amelsvoort	10 June 1981	7 November 1982	
Marius van Amelsvoort	3 June 1986	6 November 1989	
Mustafa Amhaouch	12 January 2016	5 December 2023	
Mieke Andela-Baur	30 August 1978	9 June 1981	
Mieke Andela-Baur	9 September 1981	15 September 1982	
Mieke Andela-Baur	11 November 1982	2 June 1986	
Frans Andriessen	8 June 1977	17 December 1977	
Gerard van den Anker	12 January 2021	30 March 2021	
Agnes van Ardenne-van der Hoeven	17 May 1994	21 July 2002	
Agnes van Ardenne-van der Hoeven	30 January 2003	26 May 2003	
Elles van Ark	12 November 2025		
Etkin Armut	12 November 2025		
Anneke Assen	26 April 1995	18 May 1998	
Joop Atsma	19 May 1998	13 October 2010	
Ton van Baars	15 April 1980	9 June 1981	
Ton van Baars	19 January 1982	2 June 1986	
Ada Baas-Jansen	17 May 1988	13 September 1989	
Ben Bakker	16 January 1978	9 June 1981	
Jan Peter Balkenende	19 May 1998	21 July 2002	
Jan Peter Balkenende	30 January 2003	26 May 2003	
Jan Peter Balkenende	30 November 2006	21 January 2007	
Pieter Beelaerts van Blokland	10 June 1981	8 September 1981	
Marten Beinema	16 January 1978	18 May 1998	
Joba van den Berg	23 March 2017	30 March 2021	
Joba van den Berg	29 April 2021	16 August 2021	
Joba van den Berg	29 September 2021	5 December 2023	
Bouke Beumer	8 June 1977	15 July 1979	
Pieter Jan Biesheuvel	30 July 1986	22 May 2002	
Ank Bijleveld-Schouten	16 November 1989	15 January 2001	
Ank Bijleveld-Schouten	17 June 2010	31 December 2010	
Marja van Bijsterveldt	17 June 2010	13 October 2010	
Eddy Bilder	1 March 2007	16 June 2010	
Jack Biskop	30 November 2006	16 June 2010	
Jack Biskop	26 October 2010	19 September 2012	
Elly Blanksma-van den Heuvel	30 November 2006	19 September 2012	
Liesbeth Bloemen	22 February 1994	16 May 1994	
Bas Jan van Bochove	23 May 2002	16 June 2010	
Bas Jan van Bochove	26 October 2010	19 September 2012	
Luciënne Boelsma-Hoekstra	12 November 2025		
Hans de Boer	8 June 1977	10 September 1981	
Hans de Boer	16 September 1982	12 March 1983	
Joep de Boer	8 June 1977	13 September 1989	
Mieke Boers-Wijnberg	30 July 1986	30 November 1995	
Jaap Boersma	8 June 1977	7 September 1977	
Jaap Boersma	16 January 1978	31 October 1978	
Henri Bontenbal	1 June 2021	14 September 2021	
Henri Bontenbal	29 September 2021	27 December 2021	
Henri Bontenbal	18 January 2022		
Bart van den Brink	10 May 2023	5 December 2023	
Bart van den Brink	12 November 2025	22 February 2026	
Tijs van den Brink	12 November 2025		
Fred Borgman	5 April 1978	9 June 1981	
Fred Borgman	9 September 1981	15 September 1982	
Fred Borgman	11 November 1982	15 March 1990	
Bets Borm-Luijkx	6 May 1980	9 June 1981	
Clemens Bosman	24 September 1985	2 June 1986	
Derk Boswijk	31 March 2021	22 February 2026	
Gerrit Braks	8 June 1977	5 March 1980	
Gerrit Braks	10 June 1981	8 September 1981	
Gerrit Braks	15 September 1981	3 November 1982	
Gerrit Braks	3 June 1986	13 July 1986	
Gerrit Braks	14 September 1989	6 November 1989	
Wiel Bremen	8 June 1977	9 June 1981	
Cees Bremmer	7 June 1995	18 May 1998	
Theo Brinkel	3 June 2003	29 November 2006	
Elco Brinkman	3 June 1986	13 July 1986	
Elco Brinkman	14 September 1989	25 April 1995	
Hans van den Broek	8 June 1977	10 September 1981	
Hans van den Broek	16 September 1982	3 November 1982	
Hans van den Broek	3 June 1986	13 July 1986	
Hans van den Broek	14 September 1989	6 November 1989	
Gerrit Brokx	10 June 1981	8 September 1981	
Gerrit Brokx	15 September 1981	15 September 1982	
Gerrit Brokx	21 September 1982	4 November 1982	
Gerrit Brokx	3 June 1986	13 July 1986	
Hanke Bruins Slot	17 June 2010	4 June 2019	
Hubert Bruls	23 May 2002	10 October 2005	
Judith Bühler	12 November 2025		
Siem Buijs	19 May 1998	29 November 2006	
Jan Buikema	28 August 1979	9 June 1981	
Jan Buikema	16 September 1981	16 September 1982	
Jan Buikema	11 November 1982	31 August 1985	
Piet Bukman	14 September 1989	6 November 1989	
Piet Bukman	18 May 1994	18 May 1998	
Vincent van der Burg	1 November 1979	9 June 1981	
Vincent van der Burg	1 April 1982	15 September 1982	
Vincent van der Burg	11 November 1982	18 May 1998	
Wim van de Camp	3 June 1986	13 July 2009	
Dien Cornelissen	8 June 1977	2 June 1986	
Pam Cornelissen	8 June 1977	18 January 1982	
Coşkun Çörüz	29 May 2001	19 September 2012	
Henk Couprie	24 January 1979	9 June 1981	
Henk Couprie	9 September 1981	14 September 1982	
Henk Couprie	11 November 1982	2 June 1986	
Chris van Dam	23 March 2017	30 March 2021	
Gerrit van Dam	8 June 1977	2 June 1986	
Nancy Dankers	17 May 1994	22 May 2002	
Wim Deetman	16 January 1978	10 September 1981	
Wim Deetman	16 September 1982	3 November 1982	
Wim Deetman	3 June 1986	13 July 1986	
Wim Deetman	14 September 1989	30 November 1996	
Kees van Dijk	8 June 1977	10 September 1981	
Kees van Dijk	16 September 1982	3 November 1982	
Inge van Dijk	31 March 2021		
Jan Jacob van Dijk	26 July 2002	29 January 2003	
Jan Jacob van Dijk	3 June 2003	16 June 2010	
Asje van Dijk	1 June 1993	16 May 1994	
Stef Dijkman	8 June 1977	7 December 1983 (Note: Left the parliamentary group to form the Group Scholten/Dijkman.)	
Ali Doelman-Pel	3 June 1986	18 May 1998	
Piet Hein Donner	30 November 2006	21 February 2007	
Loek Duyn	30 July 1986	19 April 1988	
Klaasje Eisses-Timmerman	25 August 1992	16 May 1994	
Klaasje Eisses-Timmerman	19 May 1998	25 April 2001	
Nihat Eski	26 July 2002	29 January 2003	
Nihat Eski	3 June 2003	29 November 2006	
Nihat Eski	15 December 2009	16 June 2010	
Berry Esselink	30 July 1986	19 September 1996	
Camiel Eurlings	19 May 1998	19 July 2004	
Hanske Evenhuis-van Essen	8 June 1977	2 June 1986	
Huib Eversdijk	8 June 1977	10 June 1991	
Sytze Faber	8 June 1977	21 January 1985	
Kathleen Ferrier	23 May 2002	19 September 2012	
Wim van Fessem	26 July 2002	29 January 2003	
Wim van Fessem	3 June 2003	29 November 2006	
Ton Frinking	22 December 1977	31 May 1993	
Léon Frissen	3 June 1986	16 May 1994	
Dzsingisz Gabor	17 May 1994	18 May 1998	
Til Gardeniers-Berendsen	8 June 1977	18 December 1977	
Til Gardeniers-Berendsen	10 June 1981	8 September 1981	
Til Gardeniers-Berendsen	21 September 1982	22 February 1983	
Pieter van Geel	23 May 2002	21 July 2002	
Pieter van Geel	30 January 2003	26 May 2003	
Pieter van Geel	30 November 2006	16 June 2010	
Lenny Geluk-Poortvliet	31 October 2017	30 March 2021	
Karien van Gennip	30 November 2006	2 September 2008	
Gerrit Gerritse	16 January 1978	16 May 1994	
Jaco Geurts	20 September 2012	9 May 2023	
Louw de Graaf	10 June 1981	18 May 1982	
Louw de Graaf	16 September 1982	4 November 1982	
Louw de Graaf	3 June 1986	13 July 1986	
Jan de Graaf	13 November 1990	16 May 1994	
Hans Gualthérie van Weezel	8 June 1977	31 July 1992	
Frans van der Gun	8 June 1977	16 July 1979	
Henk de Haan	3 December 1996	29 November 2006	
Sybrand van Haersma Buma	23 May 2002	28 May 2019	
Sarath Hamstra	12 November 2025		
Maarten Haverkamp	26 July 2002	16 June 2010	
Maarten Haverkamp	26 October 2010	19 September 2012	
Ted Hazekamp	8 June 1977	27 December 1977	
Annemieke van Heel-Kasteel	28 August 1979	9 June 1981	
Bob Heeringa	2 September 1977	18 May 1998	
Enneüs Heerma	14 September 1989	6 November 1989	
Enneüs Heerma	17 May 1994	8 April 1997	
Pieter Heerma	20 September 2012	5 December 2023	
Frans Jozef van der Heijden	20 September 2012	5 December 2023	
Martijn van Helvert	12 November 2014	30 March 2021	
Jo Hendriks	8 June 1977	7 September 1977	
Ben Hennekam	15 February 1978	30 August 1990	
Ad Hermes	8 June 1977	8 January 1978	
Ad Hermes	10 June 1981	10 September 1981	
Ad Hermes	16 September 1982	16 May 1994	
Ben Hermsen	15 September 1977	2 June 1986	
Jos Hessels	23 May 2002	9 March 2009	
Ruud van Heugten	30 November 2006	10 December 2009	
Eddy van Hijum	2 September 2002	11 November 2014	
Hans Hillen	20 March 1990	22 May 2002	
Ernst Hirsch Ballin	17 May 1994	31 May 1995	
Wopke Hoekstra	31 March 2021	9 January 2022	
Maria van der Hoeven	11 June 1991	21 July 2002	
Maria van der Hoeven	30 January 2003	26 May 2003	
Maria van der Hoeven	30 November 2006	21 February 2007	
Michiel Holtackers	30 June 2011	19 September 2012	
Jaap de Hoop Scheffer	3 June 1986	22 May 2002	
Jan ten Hoopen	5 December 1995	18 May 1998	
Jan ten Hoopen	26 June 2001	16 June 2010	
Jan van Houwelingen	8 June 1977	13 September 1981	
Jan van Houwelingen	16 September 1982	4 November 1982	
Jan van Houwelingen	3 June 1986	13 July 1986	
Jan van Houwelingen	14 September 1989	16 May 1994	
Hans Huibers	14 September 1989	16 May 1994	
Joost van Iersel	28 August 1979	9 June 1981	
Joost van Iersel	16 September 1981	15 September 1982	
Joost van Iersel	11 November 1982	16 May 1994	
Rikus Jager	23 May 2002	16 June 2010	
Jan Kees de Jager	17 June 2010	13 October 2010	
Minouche Janmaat-Abee	10 June 1981	15 September 1982	
Minouche Janmaat-Abee	22 January 1985	2 June 1986	
Minouche Janmaat-Abee	30 July 1986	13 September 1989	
Minouche Janmaat-Abee	16 November 1989	16 May 1994	
Cisca Joldersma	23 May 2002	16 June 2010	
Cisca Joldersma	17 January 2012	22 April 2012	
Gerrit de Jong	14 September 1989	18 May 1998	
Mechteld de Jong	16 November 1989	16 May 1994	
Aat de Jonge	15 September 1981	15 September 1982	
Corien Jonker	5 March 2002	22 May 2002	
Corien Jonker	31 August 2004	29 November 2006	
Corien Jonker	1 March 2007	16 June 2010	
Henk Jumelet	12 November 2025		
Mona Keijzer	20 September 2012	25 October 2017	
Mona Keijzer	31 March 2021	26 September 2021	
Cor Kleisterlee jr.	8 June 1977	31 October 1979	
Ab Klink	17 June 2010	6 September 2010	
Cees van der Knaap	19 May 1998	21 July 2002	
Cees van der Knaap	30 January 2003	26 May 2003	
Cees van der Knaap	30 November 2006	21 February 2007	
Raymond Knops	11 October 2005	29 November 2006	
Raymond Knops	1 March 2007	16 June 2010	
Raymond Knops	7 September 2010	25 October 2017	
Raymond Knops	31 March 2021	6 February 2023	
Alis Koekkoek	17 May 1994	18 May 1998	
Helmer Koetje	30 July 1986	16 May 1994	
Gert Koffeman	14 September 1989	16 May 1994	
Ton de Kok	1 March 1983	2 June 1986	
Ton de Kok	30 July 1986	13 September 1989	
Ton de Kok	16 November 1989	16 May 1994	
Jan de Koning	8 June 1977	18 December 1977	
Jan de Koning	10 June 1981	8 September 1981	
Jan de Koning	16 September 1982	3 November 1982	
Jan de Koning	3 June 1986	13 July 1986	
Myra Koomen	26 July 2002	29 January 2003	
Myra Koomen	3 June 2003	6 June 2006	
Ger Koopmans	23 May 2002	19 September 2012	
Jan Arie Koorevaar	12 November 2025		
Ad Koppejan	30 November 2006	19 September 2012	
Virginie Korte-van Hemel	15 September 1977	9 June 1981	
Virginie Korte-van Hemel	9 September 1981	15 September 1982	
Virginie Korte-van Hemel	3 June 1986	13 July 1986	
Jules Kortenhorst	30 November 2006	22 January 2008	
Roland Kortenhorst	23 May 2002	2 September 2008	
Jeltien Kraaijeveld-Wouters	8 June 1977	27 December 1977	
Jeltien Kraaijeveld-Wouters	10 June 1981	1 November 1988	
Jan Krajenbrink	10 June 1981	31 January 1994	
Roelof Kruisinga	8 June 1977 (Note: Was previously member of the House of Representatives for the CHU.)	18 December 1977	
Harmen Krul	7 February 2023		
Anne Kuik	23 March 2017	2 May 2022	
Anne Kuik	23 August 2022	5 December 2023	
Willem Kwaadsteniet	15 September 1977	3 June 1986	
Willem Kwaadsteniet	30 July 1986	13 September 1989	
Frouwkje Laning-Boersema	8 June 1982	15 September 1982	
Frouwkje Laning-Boersema	16 March 1983	16 May 1994	
Maes van Lanschot	12 November 2025		
Ad Lansink	8 June 1977	9 June 1981	
Ad Lansink	9 September 1981	15 September 1982	
Ad Lansink	11 November 1982	18 May 1998	
Gerd Leers	4 September 1990	31 January 2002	
Johan de Leeuw	3 June 1986	30 November 1991	
Hannie van Leeuwen	8 June 1977	31 March 1978	
Gerard van Leijenhorst	8 June 1977	10 September 1981	
Gerard van Leijenhorst	16 September 1982	7 November 1982	
Gerard van Leijenhorst	3 June 1986	16 May 1994	
René van der Linden	8 June 1977	13 July 1986	
René van der Linden	29 November 1988	18 May 1998	
Erik van Lith	23 May 2002	29 November 2006	
Joris Lohman	25 February 2026		
Ruud Lubbers	8 June 1977	7 September 1977	
Ruud Lubbers	22 December 1977	3 November 1982	
Ruud Lubbers	3 June 1986	13 July 1986	
Ruud Lubbers	14 September 1989	6 November 1989	
Maurits von Martels	23 March 2017	30 March 2021	
Jan Mastwijk	23 May 2002	16 June 2010	
Wim Mateman	28 August 1979	18 May 1998	
Durk van der Mei	8 June 1977	27 December 1977	
Durk van der Mei	15 September 1981	16 September 1982	
Durk van der Mei	11 November 1982	25 June 1984	
Theo Meijer	8 October 1996	31 August 2003	
Jacques de Milliano	19 May 1998	16 November 1998	
Harry van der Molen	23 March 2017	28 April 2021	
Harry van der Molen	17 August 2021	6 September 2021	
Harry van der Molen	28 December 2021	16 January 2023	
Joep Mommersteeg	22 December 1977	31 March 1982	
Corrie Moret-de Jong	30 July 1986	13 September 1989	
Aart Mosterd	24 November 1998	29 November 2006	
Gerard van Muiden	8 June 1977	9 June 1981	
Gerard van Muiden	16 September 1981	16 September 1982	
Gerard van Muiden	26 June 1984	2 June 1986	
Gerard van Muiden	30 July 1986	12 January 1989	
Agnes Mulder	20 September 2012	9 May 2023	
Nel Mulder-van Dam	14 February 1989	13 September 1989	
Nel Mulder-van Dam	16 November 1989	18 May 1998	
Frans de Nerée tot Babberich	11 June 2002	16 June 2010	
Jan Nijland	16 September 1981	15 September 1982	
Jan Nijland	11 November 1982	16 May 1994	
Jan van Noord	10 June 1981	16 May 1994	
Harrij Notenboom	8 June 1977	16 July 1979	
Niny van Oerle-van der Horst	23 May 2002	29 November 2006	
Pieter Omtzigt	3 June 2003	16 June 2010	
Pieter Omtzigt	26 October 2010	14 September 2021	
Ria Oomen-Ruijten	10 June 1981	13 September 1989	
Henk Jan Ormel	23 May 2002	19 September 2012	
Peter Oskam	20 September 2012	4 January 2016	
Hilde Palland	29 May 2019	5 December 2023	
Marleen de Pater-van der Meer	6 February 2001	16 June 2010	
Walter Paulis	7 October 1980	9 June 1981	
Walter Paulis	16 June 1983	2 June 1986	
Walter Paulis	30 July 1986	16 May 1994	
Rinus Peijnenburg	8 June 1977	18 December 1977	
René Peters	23 March 2017	5 December 2023	
Hein Pieper	17 March 2009	16 June 2010	
André Poortman	25 February 2026		
Minke van der Ploeg-Posthumus	2 December 1991	16 May 1994	
Wytske Postma	5 June 2019	30 March 2021	
Nirmala Rambocus	23 May 2002	29 November 2006	
Ram Ramlal	16 June 1992	16 May 1994	
Jacob Reitsma	30 July 1986	11 June 2001	
Theo Rietkerk	19 May 1998	20 May 2003	
Michel Rog	20 September 2012	11 January 2021	
Erik Ronnes	20 May 2015	19 May 2020	
Martin van Rooijen	1 November 1977	31 August 1980	
Riet Roosen-van Pelt	24 June 1986	16 May 1994	
Yvonne van Rooy	14 September 1989	27 September 1990	
Yvonne van Rooy	17 May 1994	31 August 1997	
Clémence Ross-van Dorp	19 May 1998	21 July 2002	
Clémence Ross-van Dorp	30 January 2003	26 May 2003	
Sander de Rouwe	1 March 2007	19 May 2015	
Onno Ruding	3 June 1986	13 July 1986	
Job de Ruiter	10 June 1981	8 September 1981	
Job de Ruiter	16 September 1982	3 November 1982	
Piet van der Sanden	8 June 1977	13 September 1989	
Maarten Schakel	8 June 1977	9 June 1981	
Hajé Schartman	15 September 1981	15 September 1982	
Hajé Schartman	11 November 1982	31 May 1992	
Janneke Schermers	30 November 2006	16 June 2010	
Jan Schinkelshoek	30 November 2006	16 June 2010	
Jan Nico Scholten	8 June 1977	9 June 1981	
Jan Nico Scholten	15 September 1981	15 September 1982	
Jan Nico Scholten	11 November 1982	7 December 1983	
Annie Schreijer-Pierik	19 May 1998	16 June 2010	
Harry Seijben	16 January 1978	27 July 1978	
Evert Jan Slootweg	31 October 2017	30 March 2021	
Evert Jan Slootweg	10 May 2022	22 August 2022	
Evert Jan Slootweg	17 January 2023	5 December 2023	
Margreeth Smilde	26 July 2002	29 January 2003	
Margreeth Smilde	3 June 2003	29 November 2006	
Margreeth Smilde	23 January 2008	19 September 2012	
Ries Smits	30 July 1986	18 May 1998	
Marian Soutendijk-van Appeldoorn	3 June 1986	18 May 1998	
Liesbeth Spies	23 May 2002	16 June 2010	
Fons van der Stee	8 June 1977	7 September 1977	
Hanneke Steen	12 November 2025		
Mirjam Sterk	23 May 2002	19 September 2012	
Jeltje Straatman	12 November 2025		
Theo Stroeken	19 May 1998	22 May 2002	
Haty Tegelaar-Boonacker	3 June 1986	2 May 1994	
Gerrit Terpstra	3 June 1986	18 May 1998	
Julius Terpstra	20 May 2020	30 March 2021	
Eveline Tijmstra	12 November 2025		
Teun Tolman	8 June 1977	16 July 1979	
Madeleine van Toorenburg	1 March 2007	30 March 2021	
Rob van den Toorn	10 June 1981	2 June 1986	
Klaas Tuinstra	3 June 1986	13 September 1989	
Klaas Tuinstra	16 November 1989	16 May 1994	
Sabine Uitslag	8 April 2008	29 July 2008	
Sabine Uitslag	3 September 2008	19 September 2012	
Eline Vedder	10 May 2023	11 November 2025	
Antoon Veerman	8 June 1977	9 June 1981	
Gerda Verburg	19 May 1998	22 February 2007	
Gerda Verburg	17 June 2010	29 June 2011	
Maxime Verhagen	17 May 1994	22 February 2007	
Maxime Verhagen	17 June 2010	14 October 2010	
Antoinette Vietsch	23 May 2002	29 November 2006	
Antoinette Vietsch	1 March 2007	16 June 2010	
Marry Visser-van Doorn	15 April 1997	22 May 2002	
Thijs van Vlijmen	10 June 1981	16 May 1994	
Berend-Jan van Voorst tot Voorst	14 September 1989	6 November 1989	
Thom Vreugdenhil	3 June 1986	13 September 1989	
Thom Vreugdenhil	16 November 1989	16 May 1994	
Yvonne Vriens-Auerbach	3 June 1986	13 September 1989	
Yvonne Vriens-Auerbach	16 November 1989	16 May 1994	
Bert de Vries	21 November 1978	6 November 1989	
Jan de Vries	23 May 2002	16 June 2010	
Nicolien van Vroonhoven-Kok	23 May 2002	12 May 2008	
Nicolien van Vroonhoven-Kok	17 August 2008	16 June 2010	
Steef Weijers	8 June 1977	13 September 1989	
Marieke van der Werf	11 January 2011	19 September 2012	
Lucille Werner	31 March 2021	5 December 2023	
Tjerk Westerterp	8 June 1977	7 September 1977	
Tjerk Westerterp	22 December 1977	14 February 1978	
Peter van Wijmen	19 May 1998	22 May 2002	
Joop Wijn	19 May 1998	21 July 2002	
Joop Wijn	30 January 2003	26 May 2003	
Joop Wijn	30 November 2006	21 February 2007	
Ans Willemse-van der Ploeg	12 October 1993	16 May 1994	
Ans Willemse-van der Ploeg	7 June 2006	29 November 2006	
Ans Willemse-van der Ploeg	1 March 2007	16 June 2010	
Bart van Winsen	23 May 2002	29 November 2006	
Herman Wisselink	8 June 1977	9 June 1981	
Frans Wolters	10 June 1981	18 May 1998	
Piet van Zeil	8 June 1977	10 September 1981	
Piet van Zeil	16 September 1982	4 November 1982	
Piet van Zeil	3 June 1986	21 June 1986	
Jantine Zwinkels	12 November 2025		
