= Parliamentary committee of the Dutch parliament =

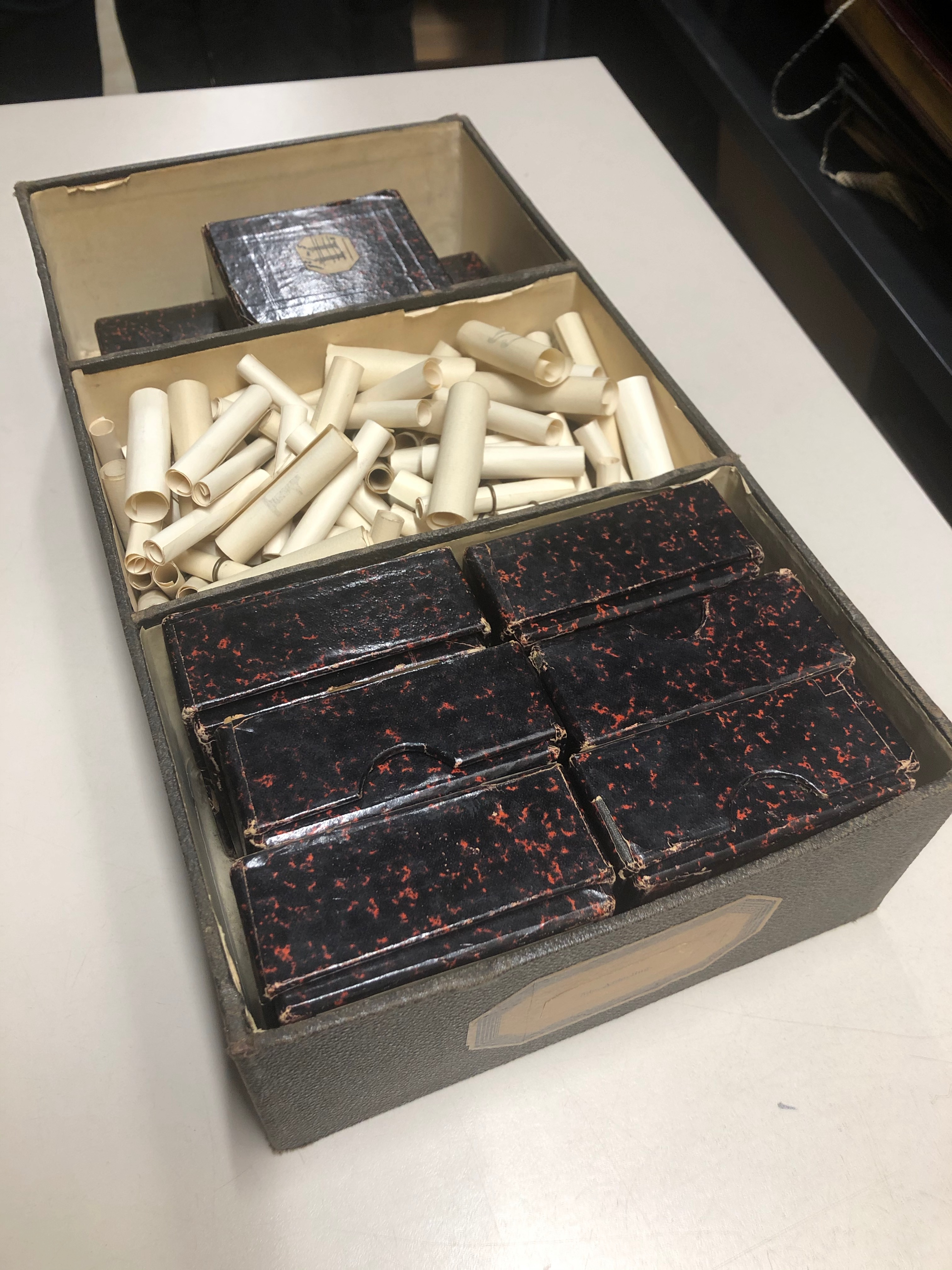
Lottery tickets were used to sort of members of parliaments onto departmental committees.

A parliamentary committee is a committee set up by the House of Representatives or the Senate for a specific substantive or procedural subject. The committees consult in so-called committee meetings.

== House of Representatives ==
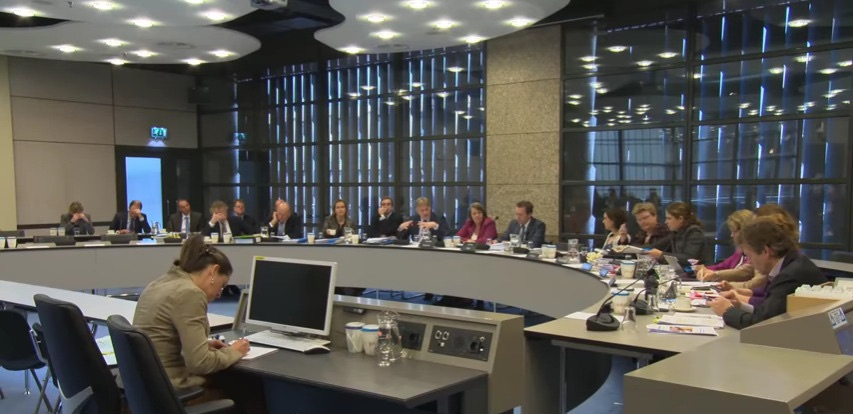
A committee meeting

=== Standing committees ===
A standing committee is a committee set up to monitor a policy area of a ministry. They are defined in the Rules of Procedure of the House of Representatives. Standing committees were established in 1953 to relieve the plenary of overly detailed discussions. In 1980 the House of Representatives had 30 permanent and 60 special committees.

In the period from the 2025 Dutch general election, there are a total of eighteen standing committees. Except for the Ministry of General Affairs, there is a permanent committee for each ministry that deals with subjects in the field of that ministry. For some ministries, the portfolio is divided over several committees. In addition, there are standing committees without a ministry for European Affairs and Digital Affairs.

Committee	Chair	Group	Vice Chair	Group
Interior	Arend Kisteman	VVD	Michelle Jagtenberg	D66
Kingdom Relations	Anouschka Biekman	D66	Songül Mutluer	PRO
Foreign Affairs	Jesse Klaver	PRO	Queeny Rajkowski	VVD
Defence	Jan Paternotte	D66	Tamara ten Hove	DNA
Economic Affairs	Wendy van Eijk	VVD	Annette Raijer	PVV
Finance	Chris Jansen	PVV	Maes van Lanschot	CDA
Infrastructure and Water Management	Renilde Huizenga	D66	Suzanne Kröger	PRO
Justice and Security	Joost Eerdmans	JA21	Erwin Prickaertz	PVV
Agriculture, Fisheries, Nature and Food Quality	Hanneke Steen	CDA	Maarten Goudzwaard	JA21
Education, Culture and Science	Jan Arie Koorevaar	CDA	Luc Stultiens	PRO
Social Affairs and Employment	Tom van der Lee	PRO	Henk Jumelet	CDA
Health, Welfare and Sport	Mohammed Mohandis	PRO	Marieke Vellinga-Beemsterboer	D66
European Affairs	Rachel van Meetelen	PVV	Fatimazhra Belhirch	D66
Foreign Trade and Development Cooperation	Renate den Hollander	VVD	Sarath Hamstra	CDA
Digital Affairs	Ralf Dekker	FVD	Bart Bikkers	VVD
Asylum and Migration	Peter de Groot	VVD	Henk-Jan Oosterhuis	D66
Climate Policy and Green Growth	Jantine Zwinkels	CDA	Jurgen Nobel	VVD
Housing and Spatial Planning	Laura Bromet	PRO	Wim Meulenkamp	VVD

=== Contact groups ===
Contact group	Chair	Group
Belgium	Ranjith Clemminck	JA21
United States	Jan Paternotte	D66
Germany	Maes van Lanschot	CDA
United Kingdom	vacant	
France	Jan Schoonis	D66

=== Delegations ===
Delegation	Chair	Group
Parliamentary Assembly of the Council of Europe	Vacant	
NATO Parliamentary Assembly	Vacant	
OSCE Parliamentary Assembly	Vacant	
Benelux Parliament	Vacant	
Interparliamentary Commission of the Dutch Language Union	Vacant	
Interparliamentary Union	Vacant	
Parliamentary Assembly of the Union for the Mediterranean	Vacant	

=== Other permanent committees ===
Committee	Chair	Group	Description
Petitions	Dion Huidekooper	D66	Receives and reviews citizens' petitions
Intelligence and Security Services	Jan Paternotte	D66	Reviews confidential aspects of government policy
Public Expenditure	Joost Sneller	D66	Reviews the legality, effectiveness and efficiency of public expenditure
Presidium	Thom van Campen	VVD	Responsible for the House of Representatives' day-to-day management
Procedure	Thom van Campen	VVD	Responsible for changes to the Rules of Procedure
Credentials	Ulysse Ellian	VVD	Reviews the conduct of elections and the admission of new members

=== Temporary committees ===
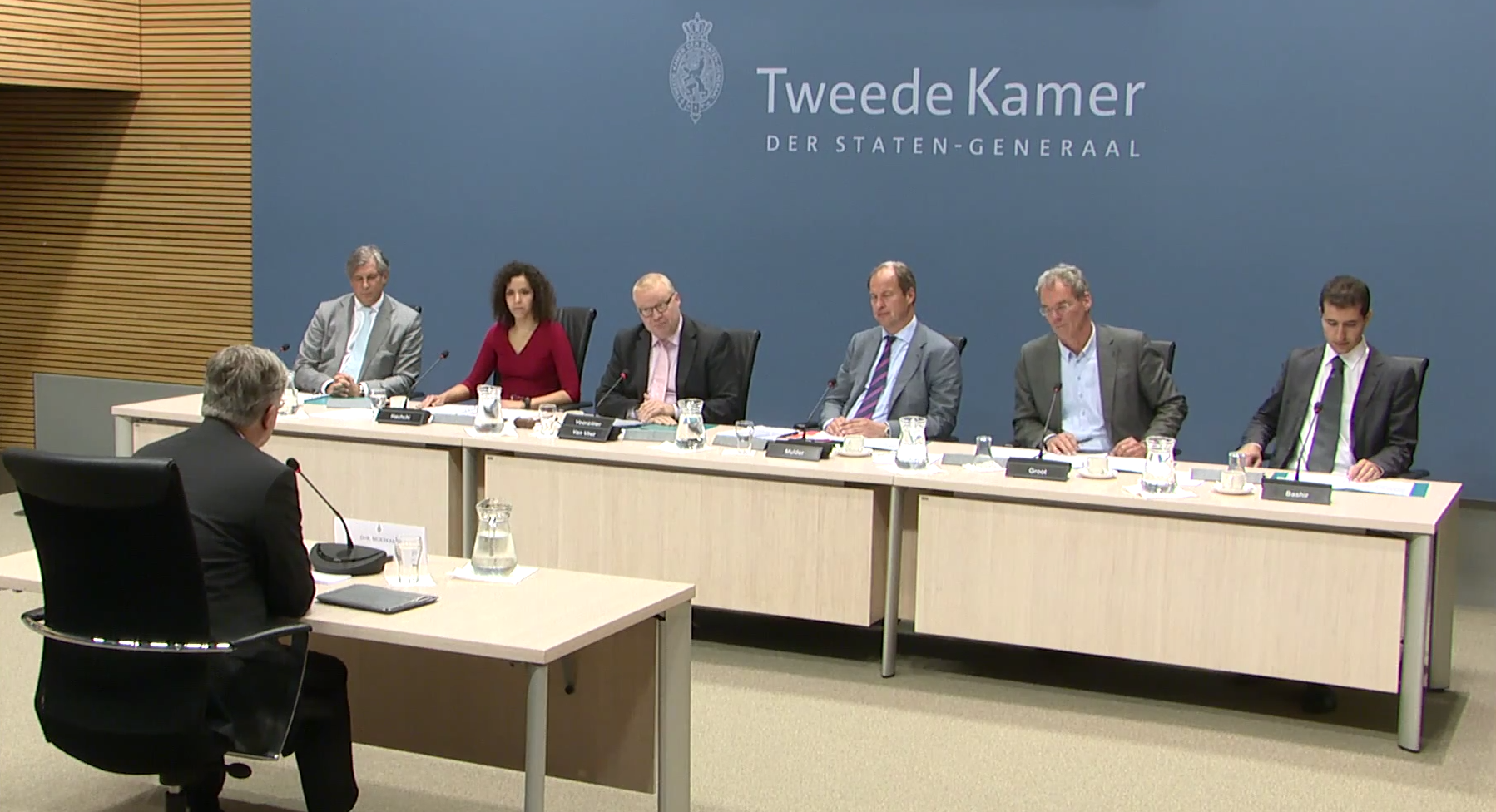
A public hearing of a parliamentary inquiry committee

Temporary committees differ from general committees in that they have a precisely defined mission. As soon as that assignment has been carried out, i.e. as soon as the committee has issued a report and this has been discussed in the House of Representatives, the committee will cease to exist.

- Parliamentary inquiry into the COVID-19 pandemic
- Committee on Fundamental Rights and Constitutional Review

== Senate ==
=== Standing committees ===
Committee	Chair	Group
Interior	Ilona Lagas	BBB
Foreign Affairs, Defence and Development Cooperation	Koen Petersen	VVD
Economic Affairs and Climate Policy	Saskia Kluit	GL/PvdA
European Affairs	Bastiaan van Apeldoorn	SP
Finance	Pim van Ballekom	VVD
Immigration & Asylum / JHA Council	Alexander van Hattem	PVV
Infrastructure, Water Management and Environment	Eric Kemperman	BBB
Justice and Security	Boris Dittrich	D66
Kingdom Relations	Paul Rosenmöller	GL/PvdA
Agriculture, Nature and Food Quality	Gert-Jan Oplaat	BBB
Education, Culture and Science	Theo Rietkerk	CDA
Social Affairs and Employment	Mei Li Vos	GL/PvdA
Health, Welfare and Sport	Janny Bakker-Klein	CDA

=== Other committees ===
Committee	Chair	Group	Description
Petitions	Gom van Strien	PVV	Receives and reviews citizens' petitions
Credentials			Reviews the admission of new members
