= List of members of the House of Representatives of the Netherlands for the Party for Freedom =

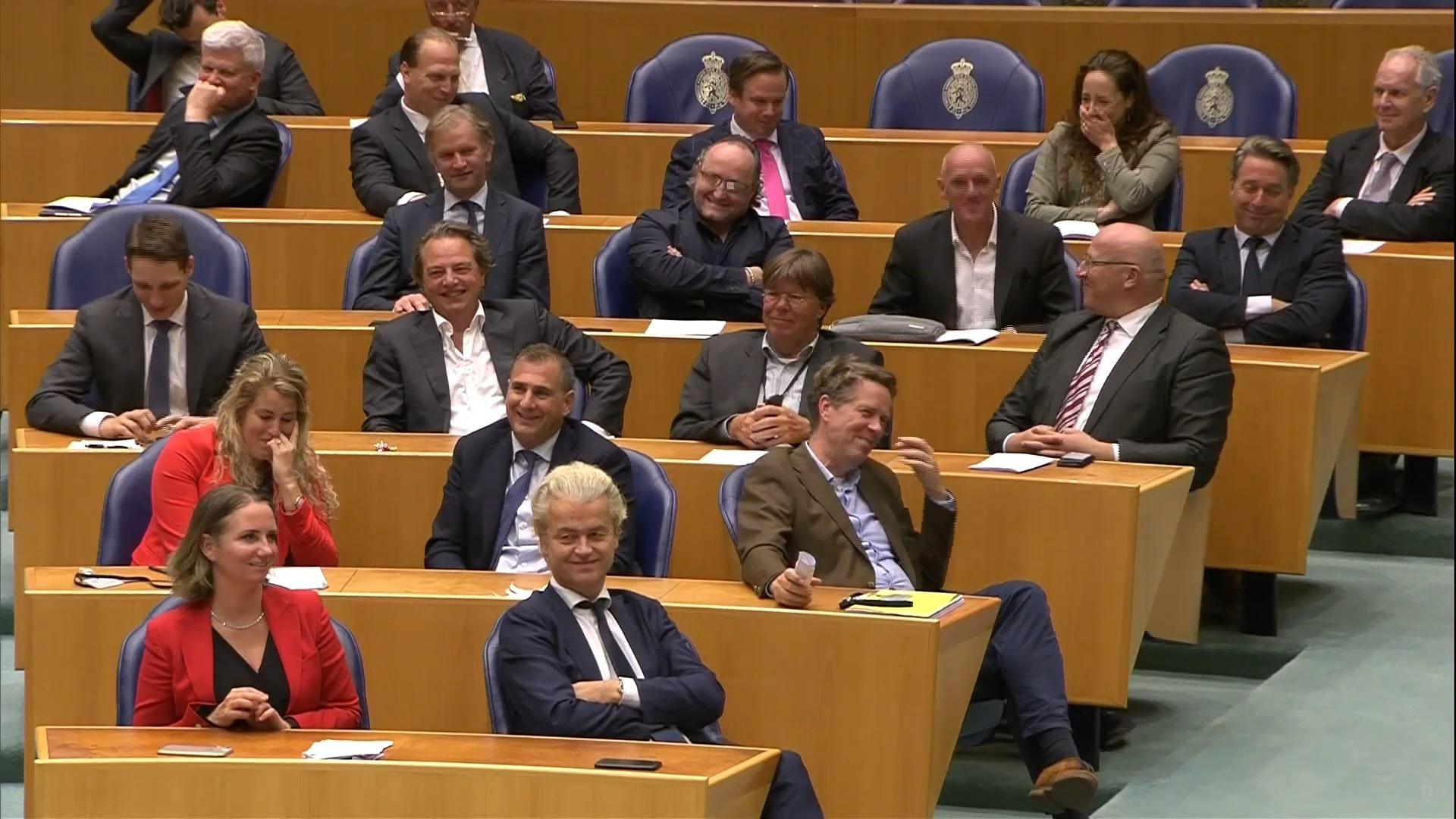
Mostly PVV members in the House of Representatives in 2019.

This is a list of all (former) members of the House of Representatives of the Netherlands for Party for Freedom (PVV).

== List ==
Member	Start date	End date	Ref.
Max Aardema	6 December 2023	11 November 2025	
Roy van Aalst	23 March 2017	30 March 2021	
Fleur Agema	30 November 2006	12 January 2015	
Fleur Agema	5 May 2015	1 July 2024	
Harm Beertema	17 June 2010	5 December 2023	
Jhim van Bemmel	17 June 2010	6 July 2012	
Ino van den Besselaar	23 November 2010	19 September 2012	
Reinder Blaauw	6 December 2023	11 November 2025	
Louis Bontes	17 June 2010	29 October 2013 (Note: Left the parliamentary group but remained a member of the House.)	
Maikel Boon	6 December 2023		
Vincent van den Born	6 December 2023	11 November 2025	
Martin Bosma	30 November 2006		
Willem Boutkan	6 December 2023	11 November 2025	
Hero Brinkman	30 November 2006	20 March 2012	
René Claassen	6 December 2023	20 January 2026	
Patrick Crijns	6 December 2023	11 November 2025	
Marco Deen	6 December 2023	11 November 2025	
Teun van Dijck	30 November 2006		
Emiel van Dijk	3 April 2018	20 July 2018	
Emiel van Dijk	12 December 2018	30 March 2021	
Emiel van Dijk	6 December 2023		
Willie Dille	17 June 2010	19 September 2012	
Johan Driessen	17 June 2010	19 September 2012	
André Elissen	17 June 2010	19 September 2012	
Eric Esser	6 December 2023	11 November 2025	
Marjolein Faber	6 December 2023	1 July 2024	
Marjolein Faber	12 November 2025		
Chris Faddegon	4 July 2024	11 November 2025	
Sietse Fritsma	30 November 2006	31 October 2019	
Sietse Fritsma	1 September 2020	5 December 2023	
Karen Gerbrands	17 June 2010	19 September 2012	
Karen Gerbrands	13 January 2015	4 May 2015	
Karen Gerbrands	23 March 2017	11 December 2018	
Machiel de Graaf	20 September 2012	5 December 2023	
Dion Graus	30 November 2006		
Peter van Haasen	6 December 2023	11 November 2025	
Lilian Helder	17 June 2010	1 September 2023	
Marcial Hernandez	17 June 2010	3 July 2012	
Hidde Heutink	6 December 2023	20 January 2026	
Tamara ten Hove	12 November 2025	20 January 2026	
Patrick van der Hoeff	6 December 2023	11 November 2025	
Chris Jansen	27 November 2019	30 March 2021	
Chris Jansen	12 November 2025		
Léon de Jong	17 June 2010	19 September 2012	
Léon de Jong	23 March 2017	11 November 2025	
Joram van Klaveren	17 June 2010	21 March 2014	
Reinette Klever	20 September 2012	22 March 2017	
Alexander Kops	23 March 2017		
Wim Kortenoeven	17 June 2010	3 July 2012	
Annelotte Lammers	12 November 2025	20 January 2026	
Eric Lucassen	17 June 2010	19 September 2012	
Barry Madlener	30 November 2006	13 July 2009	
Barry Madlener	20 September 2012	1 July 2024	
Vicky Maeijer	23 March 2017	7 December 2020	
Vicky Maeijer	30 March 2021	1 July 2024	
Vicky Maeijer	12 November 2025		
Gidi Markuszower	23 March 2017	20 January 2026	
Rachel van Meetelen	6 December 2023		
Nicole Moinat	12 November 2025	20 January 2026	
Jeremy Mooiman	6 December 2023		
Richard de Mos	1 September 2009	19 September 2012	
Edgar Mulder	23 March 2017		
Jeanet Nijhof-Leeuw	6 December 2023	11 November 2025	
Joeri Pool	6 December 2023	11 November 2025	
Gabriëlle Popken	23 March 2017	30 March 2018	
Gabriëlle Popken	20 July 2018	30 August 2020	
Erwin Prickaertz	12 November 2025		
Annette Raijer	12 November 2025		
Dennis Ram	6 December 2023	11 November 2025	
Robert Rep	4 July 2024	11 November 2025	
Raymond de Roon	30 November 2006		
Shanna Schilder	12 November 2025	20 January 2026	
James Sharpe	17 June 2010	18 November 2010	
Peter Smitskam	6 December 2023	11 November 2025	
Sebastiaan Stöteler	12 November 2025		
Folkert Thiadens	4 July 2024	11 November 2025	
Nico Uppelschoten	4 July 2024	11 November 2025	
Jan Valize	6 December 2023	11 November 2025	
Martine van der Velde	6 December 2023	11 November 2025	
Roland van Vliet	17 June 2010	20 March 2014	
Elmar Vlottes	6 December 2023		
Marina Vondeling	6 December 2023		
Henk de Vree	8 December 2020	29 March 2021	
Henk de Vree	6 December 2023	11 November 2025	
Danai van Weerdenburg	23 March 2017	5 December 2023	
Geert Wilders	30 November 2006 (Note: Was member of other parliamentary groups before.)		

== See also ==
- List of Party for Freedom candidates in the 2006 Dutch general election
- List of Party for Freedom candidates in the 2010 Dutch general election
- List of Party for Freedom candidates in the 2012 Dutch general election
- List of Party for Freedom candidates in the 2017 Dutch general election
- List of Party for Freedom candidates in the 2021 Dutch general election
- List of Party for Freedom candidates in the 2023 Dutch general election
- List of Party for Freedom candidates in the 2025 Dutch general election
