= Vliegenthart =

Vliegenthart is a Dutch surname. Notable people with the surname include:

- Hans Vliegenthart (born 1936), Dutch professor
- Lisa Vliegenthart (born 1993), Dutch politician
- Margo Vliegenthart (born 1958), Dutch politician
- Marja van Bijsterveldt (née Vliegenthart; born 1961), Dutch politician
