= Sarah El Boujdaini =

Dutch politician (born 1993)

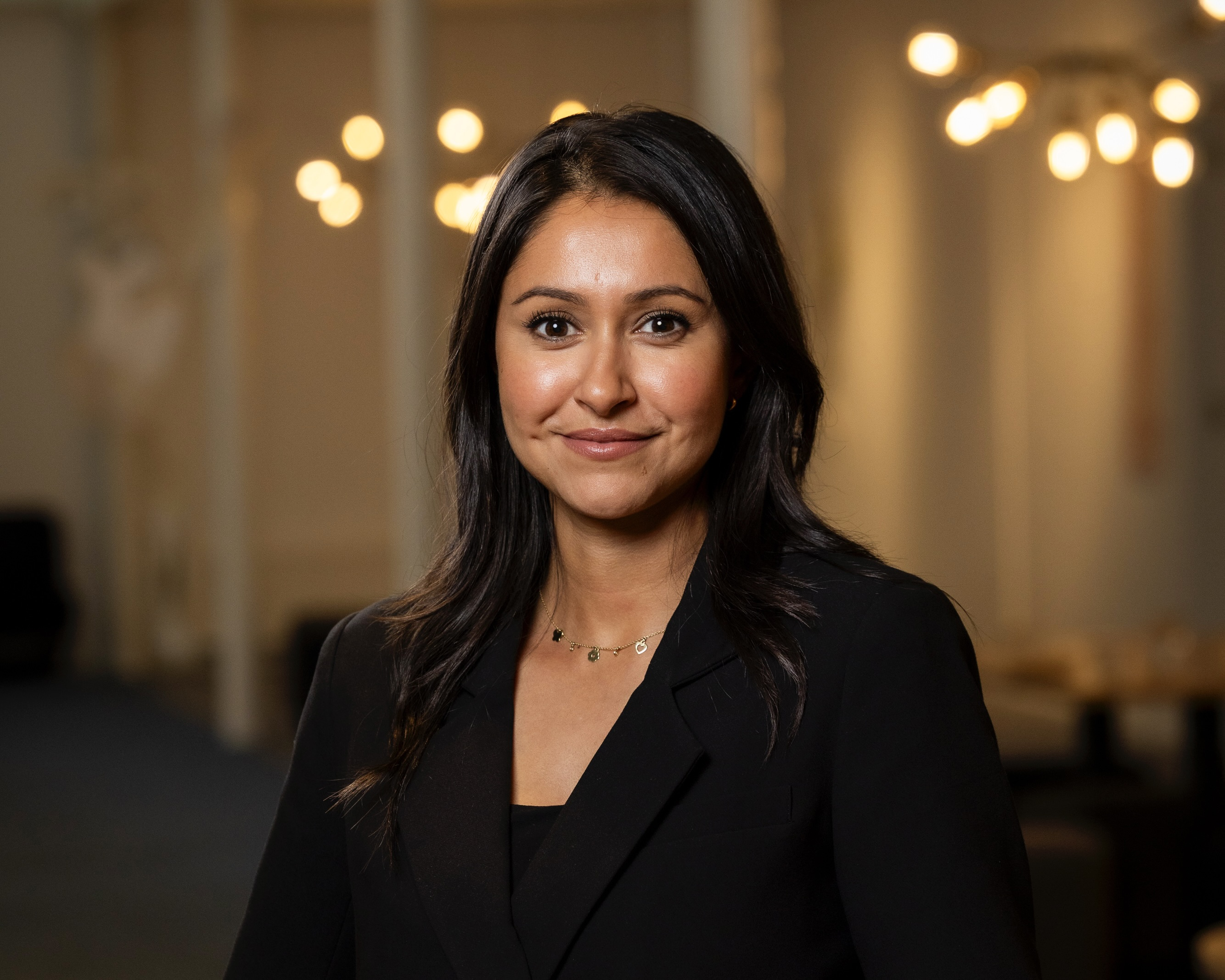
- El Boujdaini (2026)

Member of the House of Representatives
- Incumbent
- Assumed office 12 November 2025

Personal details
- Born: 28 October 1993 (age 32)
- Party: Democrats 66

Sarah El Boujdaini (born 28 October 1993) is a Dutch politician who was elected member of the House of Representatives in 2025. She has served as chairwoman of Democrats 66 in Rotterdam since 2024.
