= Heera Dijk =

Dutch politician (born 1979)

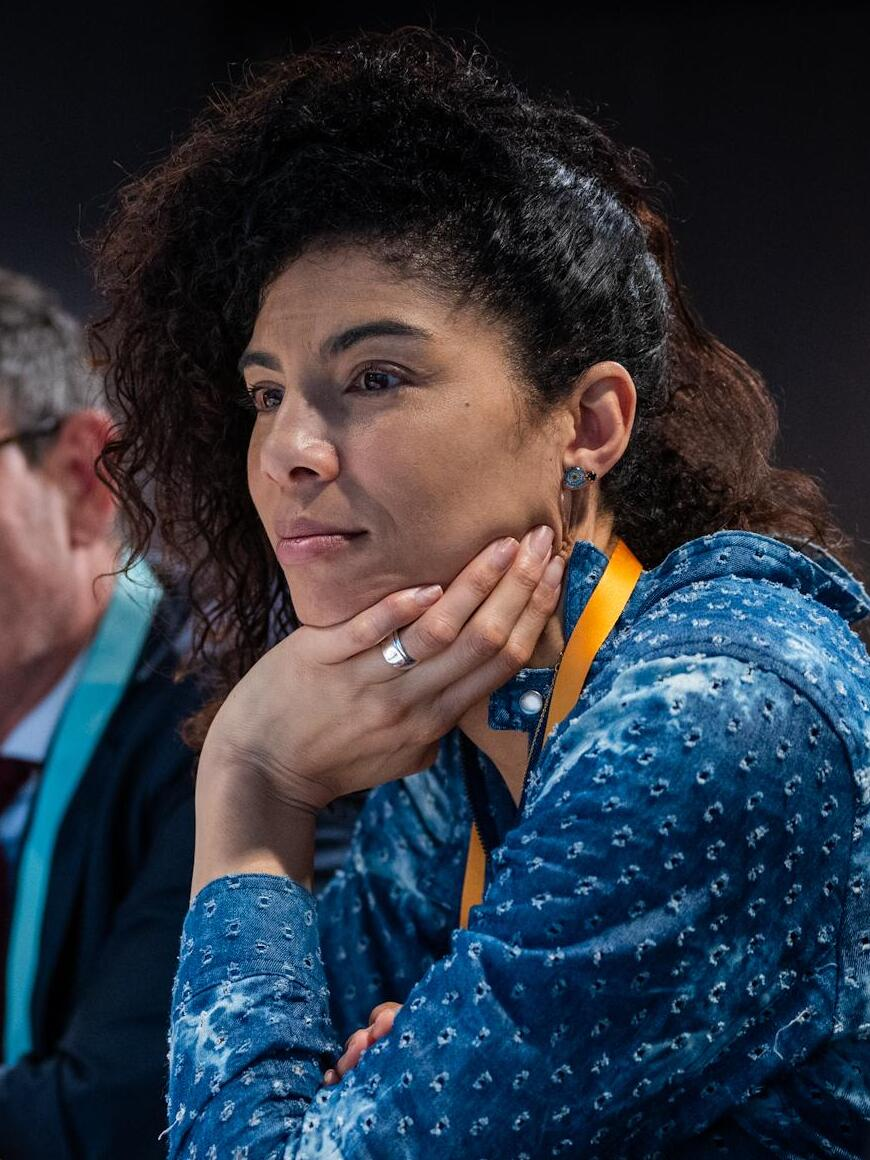
- Dijk in 2026

Member of the House of Representatives
- Incumbent
- Assumed office 12 November 2025

Personal details
- Born: 5 November 1979 (age 46)
- Party: Democrats 66
- Education: Inholland University of Applied Sciences, University of Amsterdam

Heera Dijk (born 5 November 1979) is a Dutch politician who was elected member of the House of Representatives in 2025. She has been a municipal councillor of Delft since 2022.
