= Reinder Blaauw =

Dutch politician (born 1994)

Member of the House of Representatives
- In office 6 December 2023 – 11 November 2025

Member of the Provincial Council of Groningen
- Incumbent
- Assumed office 29 March 2023

Personal details
- Born: 4 March 1994 (age 32) Scheemda, Netherlands
- Party: PVV
- Occupation: Politician

R.B. (Reinder) Blaauw (born 4 March 1994) is a Dutch politician representing the Party for Freedom (PVV). He has been a member of the Provincial Council of Groningen since March 2023. He was a member of the House of Representatives between December 2023 and November 2025.

== Early life and education ==
Blaauw was born in Scheemda on 4 March 1994. He went to high school in Winschoten from 2008 to 2012, at havo level. He subsequently studied communication at the Hanze University of Applied Sciences in Groningen.

== Political career ==
Blaauw has been a member of the Provincial Council of Groningen since 29 March 2023, representing the PVV.

During the 2023 House of Representatives elections, Blaauw was sixteenth on the electoral list of the PVV. The party eventually won 37 seats, and Blaauw was officially sworn in as a member of parliament on 6 December 2023. He served as spokesperson for higher education and science before his portfolio changed to commemorations, war victims, and sports. He was not re-elected in October 2025, and his term ended on 11 November.

=== House committees ===
- Committee for Social Affairs and Employment
- Committee for Health, Welfare and Sport
- Committee for Infrastructure and Water Management
- Committee for Housing and Spatial Planning

== Electoral history ==
Electoral history of Reinder Blaauw
Year	Body	Party	Pos.	Votes	Result		Ref.
Year	Body	Party	Pos.	Votes	Party seats	Individual	Ref.
2023	House of Representatives	Party for Freedom	15	1,867	37	Won	
2025	House of Representatives	Party for Freedom	38	576	26	Lost	
