= Anouschka Biekman =

Dutch politician (born 1980)

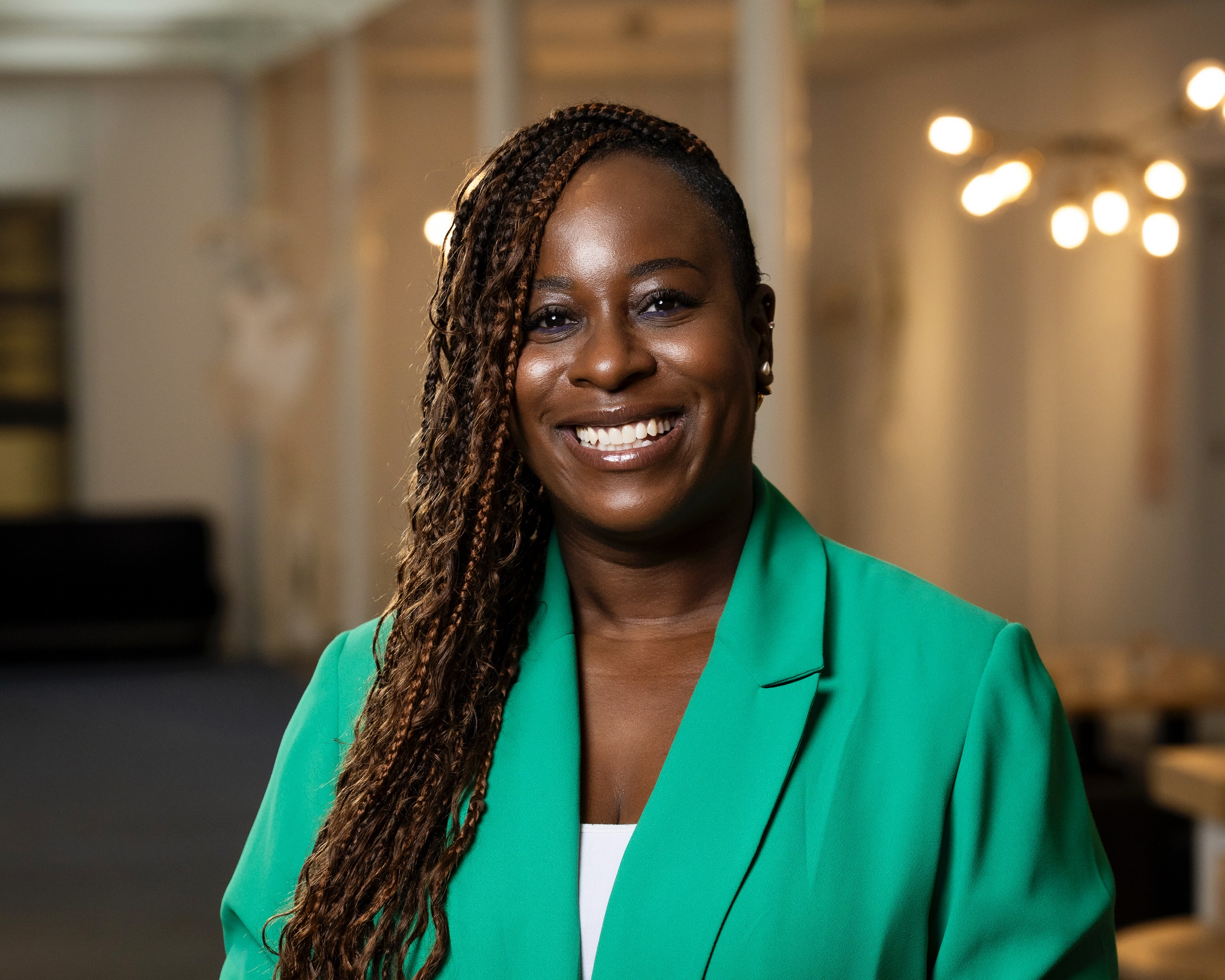
- Biekman (2026)

Member of the House of Representatives
- Incumbent
- Assumed office 12 November 2025

Personal details
- Born: 7 June 1980 (age 46) The Hague, Netherlands
- Party: Democrats 66 (since 2017)
- Relatives: Barryl Biekman (aunt)
- Education: Inholland University of Applied Sciences; Erasmus University Rotterdam

Anouschka Biekman (born 7 June 1980) is a Dutch politician who was elected member of the House of Representatives in 2025. She is the niece of Barryl Biekman.
