= Renate den Hollander =

Dutch politician (born 1977)

Member of the House of Representatives
- Incumbent
- Assumed office 12 November 2025

Personal details
- Born: 22 March 1977 (age 49) Netherlands
- Party: People's Party for Freedom and Democracy

Renate den Hollander (born 22 March 1977) is a Dutch politician for the People's Party for Freedom and Democracy (VVD). In the 2025 Dutch general election she was 18th candidate on the candidate list for the Dutch House of Representatives elections. She is Alderman of the municipality of Westerveld.

== See also ==
- List of members of the House of Representatives of the Netherlands, 2025–present
