= Barryl Biekman =

Surinamese-born Dutch politician

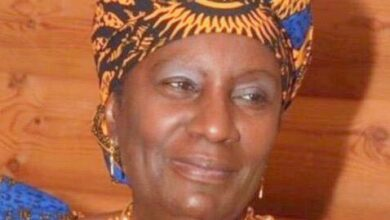
Barryl Biekman

Barryl Biekman (born 1950, Paramaribo) is a Surinamese-born Dutch politician.
