= Patrick Crijns =

Dutch politician (born 1984)

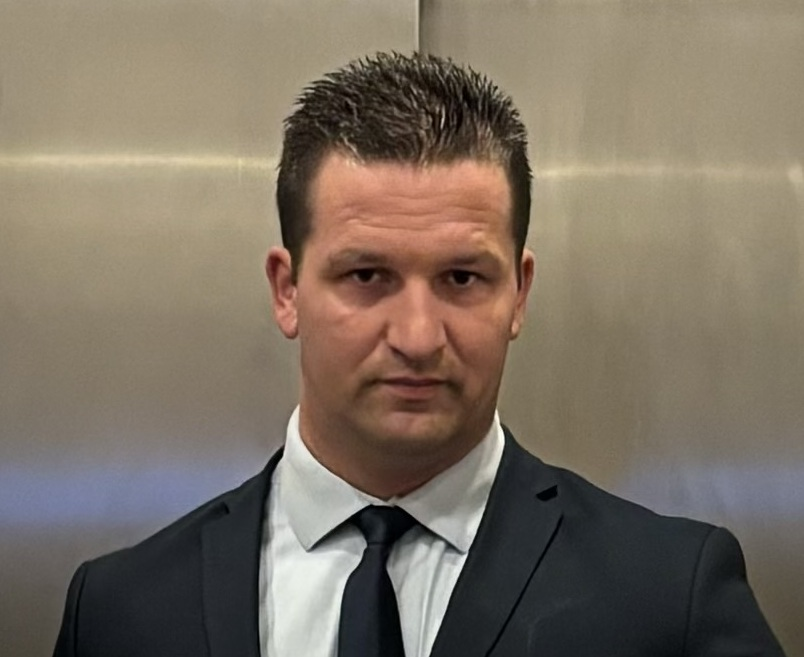
- Crijns (2024)

Member of the House of Representatives
- In office 6 December 2023 – 11 November 2025

Municipal councillor of Landgraaf
- Incumbent
- Assumed office 30 March 2022

Personal details
- Born: P.P. Crijns; 27 July 1984 (age 41) Heerlen, Netherlands
- Party: PVV
- Occupation: Politician

P.P. (Patrick) Crijns (born 27 July 1984) is a Dutch politician. Between December 2023 and November 2025, he was a member of the House of Representatives, representing the PVV. His focus was on youth and preventive healthcare.

Crijns was born in Heerlen in 1984. He worked as a security engineer before entering politics. He became active in politics after bringing a petition to the House of Representatives in 2016 calling for a Nexit referendum on Dutch membership of the European Union which was tabled in parliament by the PVV. He has also been a member of the municipal council of Landgraaf since March 2022, which he will be until 15 December 2023.

== House committee assignments ==
- Committee for the Interior
- Building advice committee
- Committee for Health, Welfare and Sport
- Committee for Foreign Trade and Development

== Electoral history ==
Electoral history of Patrick Crijns
Year	Body	Party	Pos.	Votes	Result		Ref.
Year	Body	Party	Pos.	Votes	Party seats	Individual	Ref.
2023	House of Representatives	Party for Freedom	32	953	37	Seated	
2025	House of Representatives	Party for Freedom	34	724	20	Lost	
