= Patrick van der Hoeff =

Dutch politician (born 1975)

Member of the House of Representatives
- In office 6 December 2023 – 11 November 2025

Member of the Provincial Council of Zeeland
- Incumbent
- Assumed office 2019

Personal details
- Born: 16 October 1975 (age 50) Sas van Gent, Netherlands
- Party: PVV
- Occupation: Politician

Patrick van der Hoeff (born 16 October 1975) is a Dutch politician representing the Party for Freedom (PVV). He has been a member of the Provincial Council of Zeeland since 2019, and he was a member of the House of Representatives between December 2023 and November 2025.

== Life ==
Van der Hoeff was born in Sas van Gent and worked as a supermarket manager before his political career. He has also been a municipal councilor in Terneuzen since 2015, and he was elected to the Provincial Council of Zeeland on behalf of the PVV in 2019. He was one of 37 PVV politicians elected in 2023 to the House of Representatives. He served as his party's spokesperson for primary and secondary education until his portfolio changed to teachers, higher education, and science.

=== House committee assignments ===
- Committee for the Interior
- Committee for Education, Culture and Science
- Committee for Digital Affairs

== Electoral history ==
Electoral history of Patrick van der Hoeff
Year	Body	Party	Pos.	Votes	Result		Ref.
Year	Body	Party	Pos.	Votes	Party seats	Individual	Ref.
2023	House of Representatives	Party for Freedom	21	977	37	Won	
2025	House of Representatives	Party for Freedom	32	471	26	Lost	
