= Peter van Haasen =

Dutch politician

Member of the House of Representatives
- In office 6 December 2023 – 11 November 2025

Member of Zaanstad Municipal Council
- Incumbent
- Assumed office 2018

Personal details
- Born: 21 June 1960 (age 65) Leiden, Netherlands
- Party: PVV
- Occupation: Politician

Peter van Haasen (June 21, 1960 in Leiden) is a Dutch businessman and politician representing the Party for Freedom (PVV).

Van Haasen was born in Leiden in 1960. He was the owner of an interior design and upholstery company for several years. In 2018, he was elected as a municipal councilor in Zaanstad. In the 2023 Dutch general election, he was elected to the House of Representatives. In parliament he focused on matters related to kingdom relations. He was not re-elected in October 2025, and his term ended on 11 November.

== House committee assignments ==
- Art committee (acting chair)
- Public Expenditure committee (vice chair)
- Committee for the Interior
- Committee for Kingdom Relations
- Committee for European Affairs
- Committee for Foreign Affairs
- Committee for Defence

== Electoral history ==
Electoral history of Peter van Haasen
| Year | Body | Party | Pos. | Votes | Result | | Ref. |
| Year | Body | Party | Pos. | Votes | Party seats | Individual | Ref. |
|---|---|---|---|---|---|---|---|
| 2023 | House of Representatives | Party for Freedom | 33 | 439 | 37 | Won | |
| 2025 | House of Representatives | Party for Freedom | 43 | 161 | 26 | Lost | |
