= Dennis Ram =

Dutch politician (born 1974)

Member of the House of Representatives
- In office 6 December 2023 – 11 November 2025

Municipal councillor of Groningen
- In office 2022–2023

Member of the Provincial Council of Groningen
- In office 2011–2023

Personal details
- Born: 30 March 1974 (age 52) The Hague, Netherlands
- Party: Party for Freedom (2006–present)
- Other political affiliations: Pim Fortuyn List (2002–2006)
- Education: University of Groningen
- Occupation: Politician

Dennis Ram (born 30 March 1974, in The Hague) is a Dutch politician of the Party for Freedom (PVV). He was a member of the Provincial Council of Groningen from 2011 to 2023 and a member of the House of Representatives from 2023 to 2025.

== Biography ==
=== Early life and career ===
Ram was born in The Hague in 1974. He completed pre-university studies at the Rijnlands Lyceum in Wassenaar before studying for a degree in artificial intelligence at the University of Groningen. He then worked in the telecoms industry, including for VodafoneZiggo.

=== Politics ===
Ram was a supporter of the Pim Fortuyn List before becoming active in the PVV in 2006 after being introduced to the party by Ton van Kesteren at a meeting. He was elected to the Provincial Council of Groningen in 2011 on behalf of the PVV and sat there until 2023. He is also a member of the council of the municipality of Groningen. For the 2023 Dutch general election, he was elected to the House of Representatives. In parliament, he focused on matters related to foreign trade and development cooperation. He was not re-elected in October 2025, and his term ended on 11 November.

=== House committee assignments ===
- Committee for Foreign Trade and Development
- Committee for Foreign Affairs
- Committee for Defence
- Committee for Asylum and Migration

== Electoral history ==
Electoral history of Dennis Ram
Year	Body	Party	Pos.	Votes	Result		Ref.
Year	Body	Party	Pos.	Votes	Party seats	Individual	Ref.
2023	House of Representatives	Party for Freedom	26	1,394	37	Won	
2025	House of Representatives	Party for Freedom	33	720	26	Lost	
