= Jeanet Nijhof =

Dutch politician (born 1962)

Jeanet Nijhof-Leeuw

Member of the House of Representatives
- In office 6 December 2023 – 11 November 2025

Member of the Provincial Council of Overijssel
- Incumbent
- Assumed office 23 May 2011

Personal details
- Born: 10 November 1962 (age 63) Enschede, Netherlands
- Party: PVV
- Occupation: Politician

Jeanet Nijhof-Leeuw (born 10 November 1962 in Enschede) is a Dutch business entrepreneur and politician for the Party for Freedom (PVV). She has been a member of the Provincial Council of Overijssel since 2011, and she was a member of the House of Representatives between December 2023 and November 2025.

== Biography ==
Nijhof-Leeuw was born in Enschede in 1962 before moving to Hengelo. She trained and worked as a nurse before completing vocational studies in public administration. She also runs an online pet store with her family and owns a Labrador breeding and training business.

She was elected as a municipal councilor for the PVV in Hengelo and later became the party's group leader on the council. She has also been a member of the Provincial Council of Overijssel since 2011 where she has focused on matters related to animal welfare and the environment. In the 2023 Dutch general election she was elected to the House of Representatives on the PVV's list. Her specialties were agriculture, nature, and the Dutch nitrogen crisis. She was not re-elected in October 2025, and her term ended on 11 November.

=== House committee assignments ===
- Committee for Finance (chair)
- Committee for Economic Affairs
- Committee for Agriculture, Fisheries, Food Security and Nature
- Committee for Housing and Spatial Planning
- Committee for Climate Policy and Green Growth

== Electoral history ==
Electoral history of Jeanet Nijhof-Leeuw
Year	Body	Party	Pos.	Votes	Result		Ref.
Year	Body	Party	Pos.	Votes	Party seats	Individual	Ref.
2023	House of Representatives	Party for Freedom	23	2,541	37	Won	
2025	House of Representatives	Party for Freedom	29	1,268	26	Lost	
