= Ulaş Köse =

Dutch politician (born 1997)

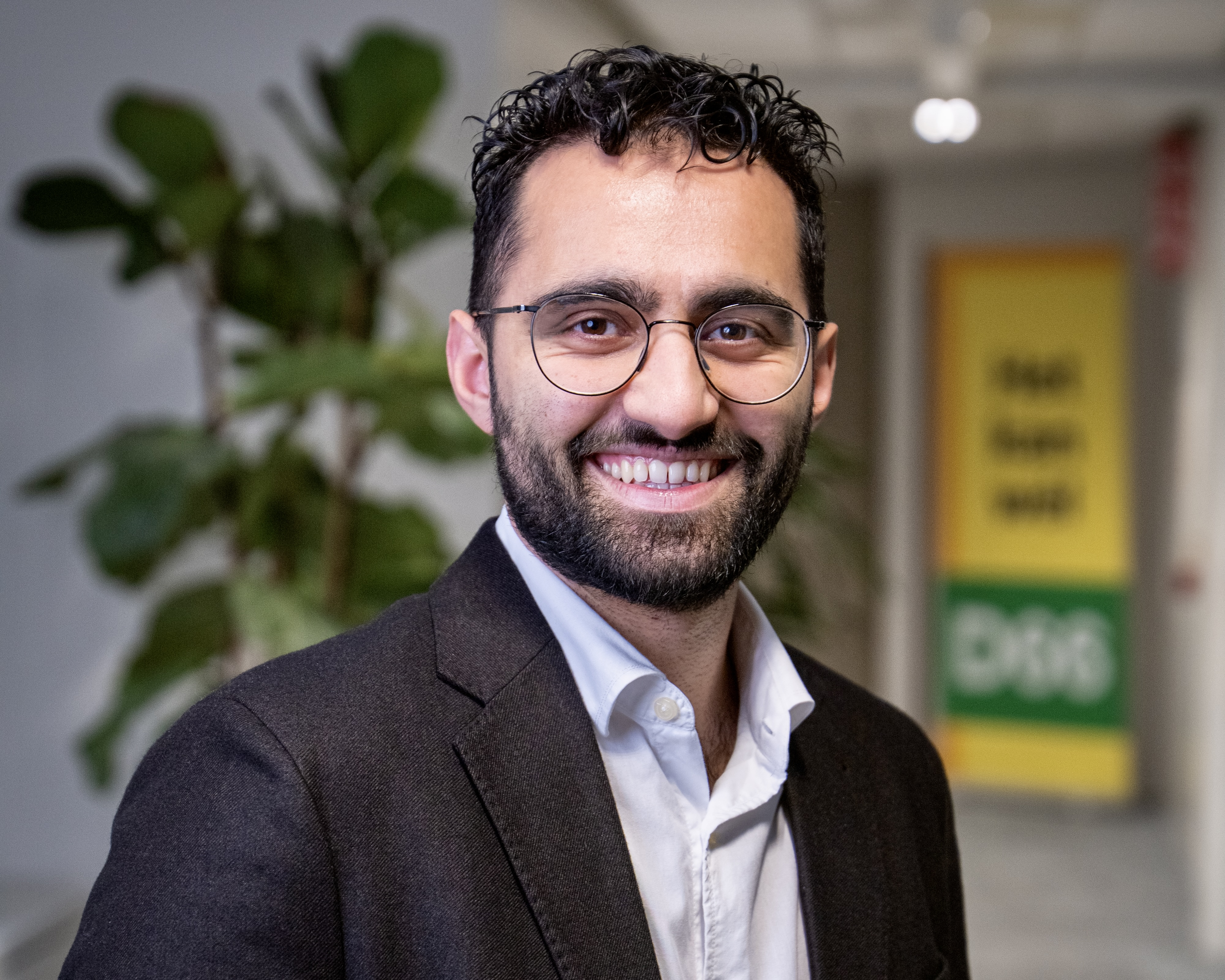
- Ulaş Köse (2026)

Member of the House of Representatives
- Incumbent
- Assumed office 12 November 2025

Personal details
- Born: 1997 (age 28–29)
- Party: Democrats 66

Ulaş Köse (born 1997) is a Dutch politician who was elected member of the House of Representatives in 2025. He has been a municipal councillor of Dongen since 2022.
