= André Poortman =

Dutch politician (born 1987)

Member of the House of Representatives
- Incumbent
- Assumed office 25 February 2026
- Preceded by: Derk Boswijk

Personal details
- Born: 27 September 1987 (age 38)
- Party: Christian Democratic Appeal

André Poortman (born 27 September 1987) is a Dutch politician serving as a member of the House of Representatives since 2026. From 2019 to 2026, he worked at the CDA Research Institute.
