= Elles van Ark =

Dutch politician (born 1981)

Member of the House of Representatives
- Incumbent
- Assumed office 12 November 2025

Personal details
- Born: 20 October 1981 (age 44)
- Party: Christian Democratic Appeal

Alice Francisca Johanna "Elles" van Ark (born 20 October 1981) is a Dutch politician who was elected member of the House of Representatives in 2025. She is the chairwoman of the Christian Democratic Appeal in Stichtse Vecht.
