= Annette Raijer =

Dutch politician (born 1968)

Member of the House of Representatives
- Incumbent
- Assumed office 12 November 2025

Personal details
- Born: 26 November 1968 (age 57) Maastricht
- Party: Party for Freedom

Annette J. Raijer (born 26 November 1968) is a Dutch politician for the Party for Freedom (PVV). In the 2025 Dutch general election, she was 24th on the candidate list for the Dutch House of Representatives elections. She was previously a council member in the municipality of Almere.

== Electoral history ==
Electoral history of Simone Richardson
Year	Body	Party	Pos.	Votes	Result		Ref.
Year	Body	Party	Pos.	Votes	Party seats	Individual	Ref.
2023	House of Representatives	Party for Freedom	42	962	37	Lost	
2025	House of Representatives	Party for Freedom	24	613	26	Won	
