= Judith Bühler =

Dutch politician (born 1972)

Member of the House of Representatives
- Incumbent
- Assumed office 12 November 2025

Personal details
- Born: 3 March 1972 (age 54)
- Party: Christian Democratic Appeal (since 1989)

Judith Bühler (born 3 March 1972) is a Dutch politician who was elected member of the House of Representatives in 2025. She has served as treasurer of the Christian Democratic Appeal in Limburg since 2021. From 1993 to 1995, she served as chairwoman of the Christian Democratic Youth Appeal in Limburg.
