= Luciënne Boelsma-Hoekstra =

Dutch politician (born 1972)

Member of the House of Representatives
- Incumbent
- Assumed office 12 November 2025

Member of the De Fryske Marren Municipal Council
- In office 21 March 2018 – 11 November 2025

Personal details
- Born: 17 July 1972 (age 53)
- Party: Christian Democratic Appeal

Luciënne Boelsma-Hoekstra (born 17 July 1972) is a Dutch politician who was elected member of the House of Representatives in 2025. From 2018 to 2025, she was a member of the Municipal Council of De Fryske Marren.
