= Rachel van Meetelen =

Dutch politician

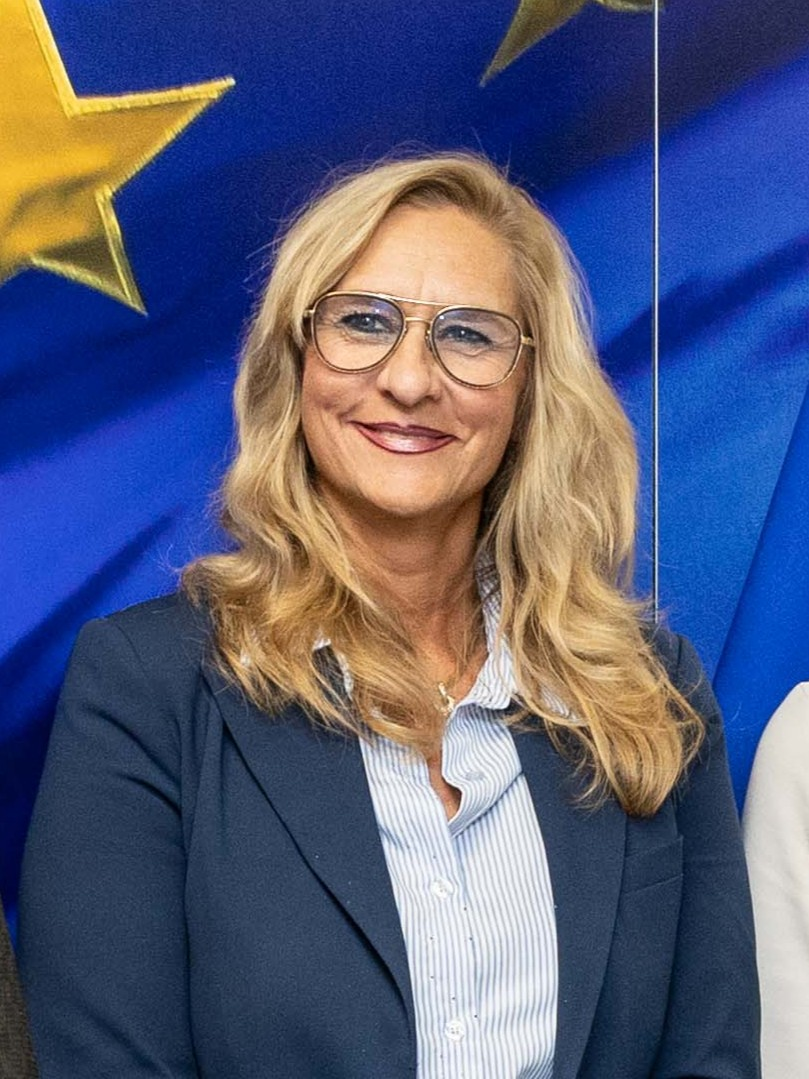

Member of the House of Representatives
- Incumbent
- Assumed office 6 December 2023

Personal details
- Born: 12 March 1975 (age 51) Amsterdam, Netherlands
- Party: Party for Freedom
- Children: 2
- Occupation: Businesswoman • Politician

Rachel Francis van Meetelen (born 12 March 1975) is a member of the Dutch House of Representatives. She lives in Bergen op Zoom and since 1998 runs a poffertjes stand at fairgrounds. She is also, since 2023, a member of the management team of the National League of Fairground Business Owners (Nationale Bond van Kermisbedrijfshouders.)

In 2023, she stood, without any political experience, on third place on the candidate list for the Party for Freedom (PVV). She was elected, and she became the party's spokesperson for economic affairs and small and medium-sized enterprises.

== House committee assignments ==
- Committee for Asylum and Migration (vice chair)
- Committee for Economic Affairs
- Contact group United States
- Committee for Infrastructure and Water Management
- Committee for Housing and Spatial Planning

== Electoral history ==
Electoral history of Rachel van Meetelen
Year	Body	Party	Pos.	Votes	Result		Ref.
Year	Body	Party	Pos.	Votes	Party seats	Individual	Ref.
2023	House of Representatives	Party for Freedom	3	8,023	37	Won	
2025	House of Representatives	Party for Freedom	25	1,159	26	Won	
