= Jeltje Straatman =

Dutch politician (born 1996)

Member of the House of Representatives
- Incumbent
- Assumed office 12 November 2025

Personal details
- Born: 25 February 1996 (age 30)
- Party: Christian Democratic Appeal

Jeltje Straatman (born 25 February 1996) is a Dutch politician who was elected member of the House of Representatives in 2025. She previously served as secretary of the Christian Democratic Youth Appeal in North Brabant.
