= Michelle Jagtenberg =

Dutch politician (born 1992)

- Jagtenberg in 2026

Member of the House of Representatives
- Incumbent
- Assumed office 25 February 2026
- Preceded by: Hans Vijlbrief

Personal details
- Born: Michelle Helena Jagtenberg; 6 November 1992 (age 33) Dordrecht, Netherlands
- Party: Democrats 66

Michelle Helena Jagtenberg (born 6 November 1992) is a Dutch politician serving as a member of the House of Representatives since 2026. From 2018 to 2026, she worked at the Royal Netherlands Aerospace Centre.
