= Eveline Tijmstra =

Dutch politician (born 1979)

Member of the House of Representatives
- Incumbent
- Assumed office 12 November 2025

Personal details
- Born: 2 December 1979 (age 46)
- Party: Christian Democratic Appeal (since 2009)

Eveline Tijmstra (born 2 December 1979) is a Dutch politician who was elected member of the House of Representatives in 2025. From 2016 to 2022, she was a wethouder of Purmerend.
