= Etkin Armut =

Dutch politician (born 1998)

Member of the House of Representatives
- Incumbent
- Assumed office 12 November 2025

Member of the Groningen Municipal Council
- Incumbent
- Assumed office 16 March 2022

Personal details
- Born: 17 August 1998 (age 27) Assen, Netherlands
- Party: Christian Democratic Appeal

Etkin Armut (born 17 August 1998) is a Dutch politician who was elected member of the House of Representatives in 2025. She has been a municipal councillor of Groningen since 2022.

== Early life and career ==
Armut was born in Assen and grew up in Hoogezand. She is of Kurdish descent and her parents are from southeastern Turkey. She studied at the University of Groningen from 2018 to 2024, and received a bachelor's degree in history and a master's degree in Middle Eastern studies. In the 2022 municipal elections, she was elected municipal councillor of Groningen.
