= Joris Lohman =

Dutch politician (born 1985)

Member of the House of Representatives
- Incumbent
- Assumed office 25 February 2026
- Preceded by: Bart van den Brink

Personal details
- Born: 1985 (age 40–41)
- Party: Christian Democratic Appeal

Joris B. Lohman (born 1985) is a Dutch politician serving as a member of the House of Representatives since 2026. From 2016 to 2023, he was a professor of the food system at the Aeres University of Applied Sciences Almere.
