= Lisa Vliegenthart =

Dutch politician (born 1993)

Member of the House of Representatives
- Incumbent
- Assumed office 12 November 2025

Personal details
- Born: 1993 (age 32–33) Rijswijk, Netherlands
- Party: GroenLinks (until 2026); PRO (since 2026)

Lisa Vliegenthart (born 1993) is a Dutch politician who was elected as a member of the House of Representatives in 2025.

== Early life and career ==
Vliegenthart was born in Rijswijk. She has a Bachelor of Applied Science in midwifery and worked as a midwife from 2016 to 2025. She volunteered at Médecins du Monde from 2020 to 2022, and has worked at the organisation since 2022.
