= Erwin Prickaertz =

Dutch politician (born 1968)

Member of the House of Representatives
- Incumbent
- Assumed office 12 November 2025

Personal details
- Born: 1968 (age 57–58)
- Party: Party for Freedom

Erwin Prickaertz (born 1968) is a Dutch politician for the Party for Freedom (PVV). In the 2025 Dutch general election, he was 21st on the candidate list for the Dutch House of Representatives elections. He is an entrepreneur from Dordrecht. He is the co-founder and director of Water bij de Wijn.
