= Renilde Huizenga =

Dutch politician (born 1970)

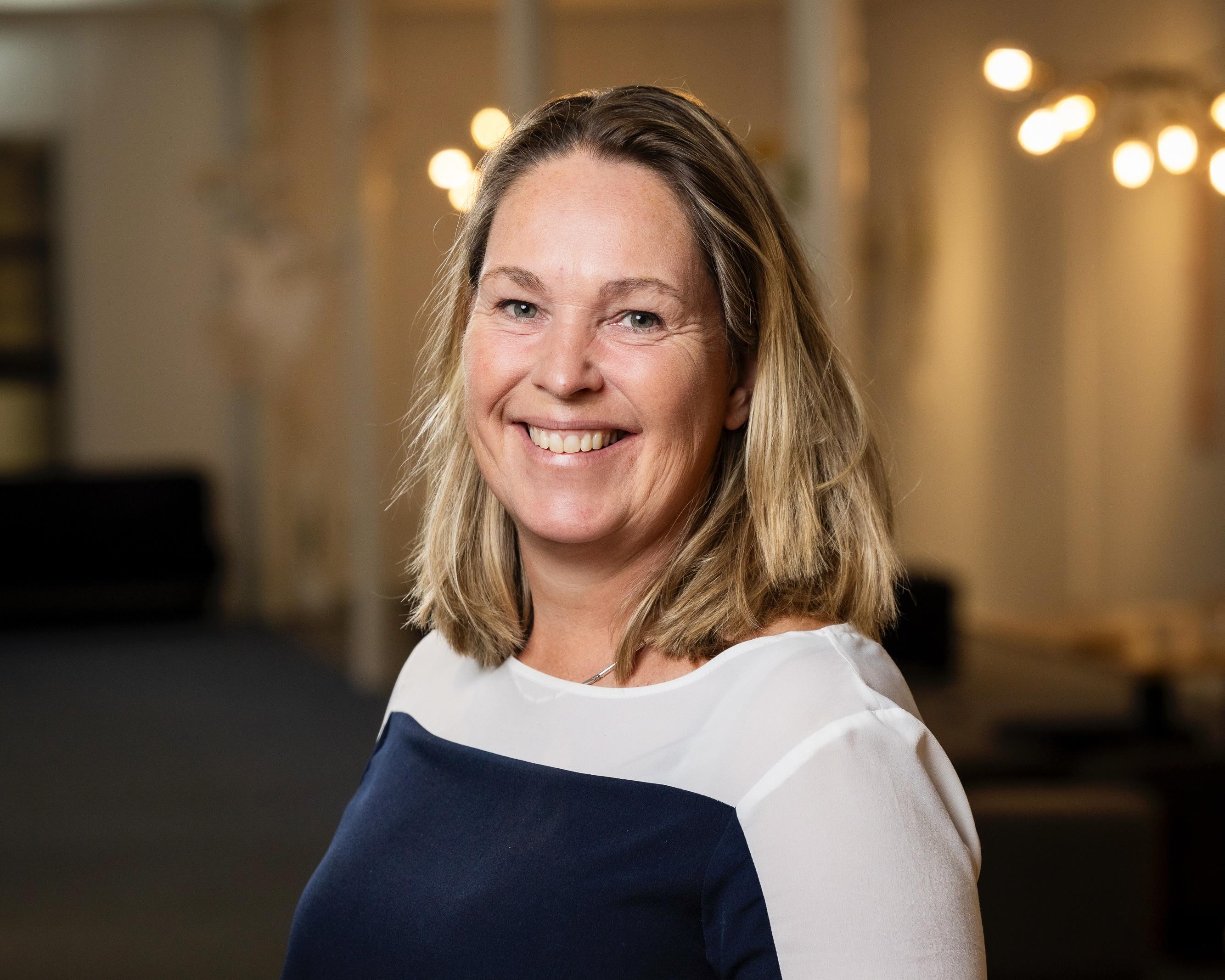
- Huizenga (2026)

Member of the House of Representatives
- Incumbent
- Assumed office 12 November 2025

Member of the Provincial Council of Overijssel
- Incumbent
- Assumed office 1 March 2022

Personal details
- Born: 7 September 1970 (age 55)
- Party: Democrats 66

Renilde Huizenga (born 7 September 1970) is a Dutch politician who was elected member of the House of Representatives in 2025. She has served as group leader of Democrats 66 in the Provincial Council of Overijssel since 2022.
