= Maes van Lanschot =

Dutch politician (born 1986)

Member of the House of Representatives
- Incumbent
- Assumed office 12 November 2025

Personal details
- Born: 31 August 1986 (age 39) Amsterdam
- Party: Christian Democratic Appeal

Maes van Lanschot (born 31 August 1986) is a Dutch politician who was elected member of the House of Representatives in 2025. From 2022 to 2025, he was a alderperson of Eindhoven.

== Personal life ==
Reinier van Lanschot, member of the European Parliament for Volt Netherlands, is his brother.
