= Henk Jumelet =

Dutch politician (born 1962)

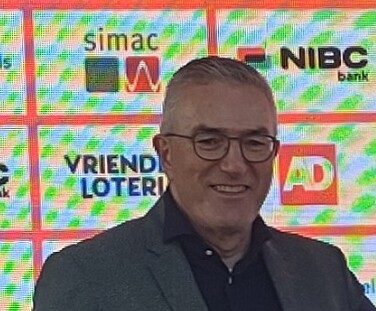

Member of the House of Representatives
- Incumbent
- Assumed office 12 November 2025

Personal details
- Born: 17 March 1962 (age 64) Velsen, Netherlands
- Party: Christian Democratic Appeal

Hendrik Gabriël (Henk) Jumelet (born 17 March 1962) is a Dutch politician who has served as a member of the House of Representatives for the Christian Democratic Appeal (CDA) since 2025.

== Personal life ==
Jumelet is married. In 2009, his son died at the age of 20.

== See also ==
- List of members of the House of Representatives of the Netherlands, 2025–present
