= Sarath Hamstra =

Dutch politician (born 1987)

Member of the House of Representatives
- Incumbent
- Assumed office 12 November 2025

Personal details
- Born: 1987 (age 38–39)
- Party: Christian Democratic Appeal (since 2010)

Sarath Hamstra (born 1987) is a Sri Lankan-born Dutch politician who was elected member of the House of Representatives in 2025. He has been a wethouder of Ermelo since 2022.
