= Jan Arie Koorevaar =

Dutch politician (born 1979)

Member of the House of Representatives
- Incumbent
- Assumed office 12 November 2025

Personal details
- Born: 3 August 1979 (age 46)
- Party: Christian Democratic Appeal

Jan Arie Koorevaar (born 3 August 1979) is a Dutch politician who was elected member of the House of Representatives in 2025. He has served as group leader of the Christian Democratic Appeal in the municipal council of Molenlanden since 2022.
