= Jantine Zwinkels =

Dutch politician (born 1990)

Member of the House of Representatives
- Incumbent
- Assumed office 12 November 2025

Personal details
- Born: 28 May 1990 (age 35)
- Party: Christian Democratic Appeal

Jantine Zwinkels (born 28 May 1990) is a Dutch politician who was elected member of the House of Representatives in 2025. She has been a municipal councillor of Utrecht since 2018, and has served as group leader of the Christian Democratic Appeal since 2021.
