= List of members of the House of Representatives of the Netherlands, 2023–2025 =

House of Representatives, 2023–2025
| ← | 2021–2023 | 2025–present | → |
- Party composition of the House

Overview
- Legislative body: House of Representatives
- Meeting place: Bezuidenhoutseweg 67, The Hague
- Term: 6 December 2023 – 11 November 2025
- Election: 2023 general election
- Government: Schoof cabinet PVV (37) (until 3 June 2025) VVD (24) NSC (19) (until 22 August 2025) BBB (7) Joseph (1, BBB, ex-NSC)
- Opposition: GL-PvdA (25) D66 (9) SP (5) CDA (5) SGP (3) CU (3) PvdD (3) Denk (3) Volt (2) FvD (3) JA21 (1)
- Members: 150
- Speaker: Martin Bosma

Between 6 December 2023 and 11 November 2025, 183 individuals served in the House of Representatives, the 150-seat lower house of the States-General of the Netherlands. After the general election of 22 November 2023, 150 members were elected and installed at the start of the term. There were 33 replacements during the term, some of them temporary. Martin Bosma was elected Speaker of the House of Representatives for this period.

After the election, the Schoof cabinet was formed from a coalition of the Party for Freedom (PVV, 37 seats), People's Party for Freedom and Democracy (VVD, 24 seats), New Social Contract (NSC, 20 seats) and the Farmer–Citizen Movement (BBB, 7 seats). The opposition consisted of GroenLinks–PvdA (GL-PvdA, 25 seats), Democrats 66 (D66, 9 seats), Christian Democratic Appeal (CDA, 5 seats), the Socialist Party (SP, 5 seats), Forum for Democracy (FvD, 3 seats), the Party for the Animals (PvdD, 3 seats), the Reformed Political Party (SGP, 3 seats), Christian Union (CU, 3 seats), Denk (3 seats), Volt (2 seats) and JA21 (1 seat).

During the term, one member switched their parliamentary group affiliation, changing the party composition of the House of Representatives. (Note: Resignations generally do not affect the balance of power, as replacements are appointed from the party list) Agnes Joseph left NSC and joined BBB on 30 July 2025.

== Members ==
All members are sworn in at the start of the term, even if they are not new. Assumed office in this list therefore refers to the swearing-in during this term (or return date of members who left), while all members are automatically considered to have left office at the end of the term.

Members of the House of Representatives of the Netherlands, 2023–2025
| Name | Parliamentary group | Assumed office | Left office | Ref. |
|---|---|---|---|---|
| Max Aardema | PVV | 6 December 2023 | 11 November 2025 | |
| Thierry Aartsen | VVD | 6 December 2023 | 18 June 2025 (Note: Left to join the cabinet) | |
| Ismail el Abassi | Denk | 6 December 2023 | 11 November 2025 | |
| Fleur Agema | PVV | 6 December 2023 | 2 July 2024 | |
| Stephan van Baarle | Denk | 6 December 2023 | 11 November 2025 | |
| Mpanzu Bamenga | D66 | 6 December 2023 | 11 November 2025 | |
| Thierry Baudet | FvD | 6 December 2023 | 12 January 2025 (Note: Left to take paternity leave) | |
| Thierry Baudet | FvD | 1 April 2025 | 11 November 2025 | |
| Bente Becker | VVD | 6 December 2023 | 11 November 2025 | |
| Sandra Beckerman | SP | 6 December 2023 | 11 November 2025 | |
| Martin de Beer | VVD | 25 June 2025 | 11 November 2025 | |
| Harry Bevers | VVD | 4 July 2024 | 11 November 2025 | |
| Mirjam Bikker | CU | 6 December 2023 | 11 November 2025 | |
| Bart Bikkers | VVD | 26 March 2025 | 11 November 2025 | |
| Reinder Blaauw | PVV | 6 December 2023 | 11 November 2025 | |
| Henri Bontenbal | CDA | 6 December 2023 | 11 November 2025 | |
| Diederik Boomsma | NSC | 4 July 2024 | 21 August 2025 (Note: Left after being placed on the candidate list for JA21) | |
| Maikel Boon | PVV | 6 December 2023 | 11 November 2025 | |
| Vincent van den Born | PVV | 6 December 2023 | 11 November 2025 | |
| Martin Bosma | PVV | 6 December 2023 | 11 November 2025 | |
| Derk Boswijk | CDA | 6 December 2023 | 11 November 2025 | |
| Willem Boutkan | PVV | 6 December 2023 | 11 November 2025 | |
| Ruben Brekelmans | VVD | 6 December 2023 | 2 July 2024 | |
| Laura Bromet | GL-PvdA | 6 December 2023 | 11 November 2025 | |
| Faith Bruyning | NSC | 6 December 2023 | 11 November 2025 | |
| Eric van der Burg | VVD | 6 December 2023 | 11 November 2025 | |
| Martijn Buijsse | VVD | 4 July 2024 | 11 November 2025 | |
| Julian Bushoff | GL-PvdA | 6 December 2023 | 11 November 2025 | |
| Thom van Campen | VVD | 6 December 2023 | 11 November 2025 | |
| Don Ceder | CU | 6 December 2023 | 11 November 2025 | |
| Glimina Chakor | GL-PvdA | 6 December 2023 | 11 November 2025 | |
| René Claassen | PVV | 6 December 2023 | 11 November 2025 | |
| Patrick Crijns | PVV | 6 December 2023 | 11 November 2025 | |
| Laurens Dassen | Volt | 6 December 2023 | 11 November 2025 | |
| Marco Deen | PVV | 6 December 2023 | 11 November 2025 | |
| Ralf Dekker | FvD | 19 November 2024 | 31 March 2025 (Note: Left so Baudet and Van Houwelingen could return from their leave) | |
| Teun van Dijck | PVV | 6 December 2023 | 11 November 2025 | |
| Jimmy Dijk | SP | 6 December 2023 | 11 November 2025 | |
| Diederik van Dijk | SGP | 6 December 2023 | 11 November 2025 | |
| Emiel van Dijk | PVV | 6 December 2023 | 11 November 2025 | |
| Inge van Dijk | CDA | 6 December 2023 | 11 November 2025 | |
| Olger van Dijk | NSC | 6 December 2023 | 11 November 2025 | |
| Sarah Dobbe | SP | 13 December 2023 | 11 November 2025 | |
| Rosemarijn Dral | VVD | 4 July 2024 | 11 November 2025 | |
| Joost Eerdmans | JA21 | 6 December 2023 | 11 November 2025 | |
| Wendy van Eijk | VVD | 6 December 2023 | 11 November 2025 | |
| Ulysse Ellian | VVD | 6 December 2023 | 11 November 2025 | |
| Doğukan Ergin | Denk | 6 December 2023 | 11 November 2025 | |
| Silvio Erkens | VVD | 6 December 2023 | 11 November 2025 | |
| Eric Esser | PVV | 6 December 2023 | 11 November 2025 | |
| Marjolein Faber | PVV | 6 December 2023 | 2 July 2024 | |
| Chris Faddegon | PVV | 4 July 2024 | 11 November 2025 | |
| André Flach | SGP | 6 December 2023 | 11 November 2025 | |
| Geert Gabriëls | GL-PvdA | 6 December 2023 | 11 November 2025 | |
| Dion Graus | PVV | 6 December 2023 | 11 November 2025 | |
| Pieter Grinwis | CU | 6 December 2023 | 11 November 2025 | |
| Dieke van Groningen | VVD | 11 September 2025 | 11 November 2025 | |
| Peter de Groot | VVD | 6 December 2023 | 11 November 2025 | |
| Tjeerd de Groot | D66 | 12 December 2023 | 28 March 2024 (Note: End of temporary replacement) | |
| Marleen Haage | GL-PvdA | 18 December 2024 | 11 November 2025 | |
| Peter van Haasen | PVV | 6 December 2023 | 11 November 2025 | |
| Jeroen Hartsuiker | VVD | 25 June 2025 | 11 November 2025 | |
| Eelco Heinen | VVD | 6 December 2023 | 2 July 2024 | |
| Annemarie Heite | NSC | 4 July 2024 | 11 November 2025 | |
| Lilian Helder | BBB | 6 December 2023 | 4 March 2025 (Note: Left after disagreements within the parliamentary group) | |
| Sophie Hermans | VVD | 6 December 2023 | 2 July 2024 | |
| Rosanne Hertzberger | NSC | 6 December 2023 | 19 November 2024 (Note: Left after political disagreements) | |
| Rosanne Hertzberger | NSC | 1 July 2025 | 11 November 2025 | |
| Hidde Heutink | PVV | 6 December 2023 | 11 November 2025 | |
| Eddy van Hijum | NSC | 6 December 2023 | 2 July 2024 | |
| Eddy van Hijum | NSC | 2 September 2025 | 11 November 2025 | |
| Jacqueline van den Hil | VVD | 12 December 2023 | 28 March 2024 | |
| Jacqueline van den Hil | VVD | 4 July 2024 | 13 May 2025 (Note: Left after accepting another job) | |
| Daniëlle Hirsch | GL-PvdA | 6 December 2023 | 11 November 2025 | |
| Patrick van der Hoeff | PVV | 6 December 2023 | 11 November 2025 | |
| Harm Holman | NSC | 6 December 2023 | 11 November 2025 | |
| Habtamu de Hoop | GL-PvdA | 6 December 2023 | 11 November 2025 | |
| Pepijn van Houwelingen | FvD | 18 January 2024 | 18 November 2024 (Note: Left to care for his pregnant wife) | |
| Pepijn van Houwelingen | FvD | 1 April 2025 | 31 August 2025 (Note: Left so lead candidate De Vos could take up a seat) | |
| Folkert Idsinga | NSC | 6 December 2023 | 2 July 2024 | |
| Folkert Idsinga | NSC | 27 November 2024 | 11 November 2025 | |
| Daniëlle Jansen | NSC | 6 December 2023 | 18 June 2025 | |
| Freek Jansen | FvD | 6 December 2023 | 16 January 2024 (Note: Left the House so Pepijn van Houwelingen could join the parliamentary inquiry into the approach to the COVID-19 pandemic) | |
| Rob Jetten | D66 | 6 December 2023 | 11 November 2025 | |
| Léon de Jong | PVV | 6 December 2023 | 11 November 2025 | |
| Agnes Joseph | NSC (Note: Until 30 July 2025) | 6 December 2023 | 11 November 2025 | |
| Agnes Joseph | BBB (Note: Since 30 July 2025) | 6 December 2023 | 11 November 2025 | |
| Isa Kahraman | NSC | 6 December 2023 | 11 November 2025 | |
| Roelien Kamminga | VVD | 6 December 2023 | 3 June 2025 (Note: Left to become mayor of Groningen) | |
| Barbara Kathmann | GL-PvdA | 6 December 2023 | 11 November 2025 | |
| Mona Keijzer | BBB | 6 December 2023 | 2 July 2024 | |
| Bart van Kent | SP | 6 December 2023 | 11 November 2025 | |
| Arend Kisteman | VVD | 6 December 2023 | 11 November 2025 | |
| Jesse Klaver | GL-PvdA | 6 December 2023 | 11 November 2025 | |
| Marieke Koekkoek | Volt | 6 December 2023 | 11 November 2025 | |
| Willem Koops | NSC | 3 December 2024 | 11 November 2025 | |
| Alexander Kops | PVV | 6 December 2023 | 11 November 2025 | |
| Daan de Kort | VVD | 6 December 2023 | 11 November 2025 | |
| Ria de Korte | NSC | 17 December 2024 | 11 November 2025 | |
| Ines Kostić | PvdD | 6 December 2023 | 11 November 2025 | |
| Bram Kouwenhoven | NSC | 14 May 2025 | 11 November 2025 | |
| Suzanne Kröger | GL-PvdA | 6 December 2023 | 11 November 2025 | |
| Harmen Krul | CDA | 6 December 2023 | 11 November 2025 | |
| Esmah Lahlah | GL-PvdA | 6 December 2023 | 11 November 2025 | |
| Tom van der Lee | GL-PvdA | 6 December 2023 | 11 November 2025 | |
| Senna Maatoug | GL-PvdA | 6 December 2023 | 17 December 2024 (Note: Left to become alderman of Utrecht) | |
| Barry Madlener | PVV | 6 December 2023 | 2 July 2024 | |
| Vicky Maeijer | PVV | 6 December 2023 | 2 July 2024 | |
| Lilian Marijnissen | SP | 6 December 2023 | 12 December 2023 (Note: Left after disappointing election results) | |
| Gidi Markuszower | PVV | 6 December 2023 | 11 November 2025 | |
| Claire Martens | VVD | 6 December 2023 | 11 November 2025 | |
| Rachel van Meetelen | PVV | 6 December 2023 | 11 November 2025 | |
| Gideon van Meijeren | FvD | 6 December 2023 | 11 November 2025 | |
| Wim Meulenkamp | VVD | 6 December 2023 | 11 November 2025 | |
| Ingrid Michon-Derkzen | VVD | 6 December 2023 | 11 November 2025 | |
| Mohammed Mohandis | GL-PvdA | 6 December 2023 | 11 November 2025 | |
| Jeremy Mooiman | PVV | 6 December 2023 | 11 November 2025 | |
| Edgar Mulder | PVV | 6 December 2023 | 11 November 2025 | |
| Songül Mutluer | GL-PvdA | 6 December 2023 | 11 November 2025 | |
| Jeanet Nijhof-Leeuw | PVV | 6 December 2023 | 11 November 2025 | |
| Michiel van Nispen | SP | 6 December 2023 | 11 November 2025 | |
| Jimme Nordkamp | GL-PvdA | 6 December 2023 | 11 November 2025 | |
| Pieter Omtzigt | NSC | 6 December 2023 | 13 May 2025 (Note: Left for health reasons) | |
| Martin Oostenbrink | BBB | 5 March 2025 | 11 November 2025 | |
| Tjebbe van Oostenbruggen | NSC | 6 December 2023 | 15 November 2024 | |
| Esther Ouwehand | PvdD | 6 December 2023 | 11 November 2025 | |
| Sandra Palmen | NSC | 6 December 2023 | 12 December 2024 | |
| Jan Paternotte | D66 | 6 December 2023 | 11 November 2025 | |
| Mariëtte Patijn | GL-PvdA | 6 December 2023 | 11 November 2025 | |
| Mariëlle Paul | VVD | 6 December 2023 | 2 July 2024 | |
| Wieke Paulusma | D66 | 6 December 2023 | 11 November 2025 | |
| Cor Pierik | BBB | 6 December 2023 | 11 November 2025 | |
| Anita Pijpelink | GL-PvdA | 6 December 2023 | 11 November 2025 | |
| Kati Piri | GL-PvdA | 6 December 2023 | 11 November 2025 | |
| Caroline van der Plas | BBB | 6 December 2023 | 11 November 2025 | |
| Anne-Marijke Podt | D66 | 6 December 2023 | 11 November 2025 | |
| Joeri Pool | PVV | 6 December 2023 | 11 November 2025 | |
| Wytske Postma | NSC | 6 December 2023 | 11 November 2025 | |
| Queeny Rajkowski | VVD | 6 December 2023 | 7 December 2023 (Note: Went on parental leave) | |
| Queeny Rajkowski | VVD | 29 March 2024 | 11 November 2025 | |
| Dennis Ram | PVV | 6 December 2023 | 11 November 2025 | |
| Robert Rep | PVV | 4 July 2024 | 11 November 2025 | |
| Simone Richardson | VVD | 4 June 2025 | 11 November 2025 | |
| Mariska Rikkers | BBB | 4 July 2024 | 11 November 2025 | |
| Ilana Rooderkerk | D66 | 6 December 2023 | 7 December 2023 | |
| Ilana Rooderkerk | D66 | 29 March 2024 | 11 November 2025 | |
| Raymond de Roon | PVV | 6 December 2023 | 11 November 2025 | |
| Ilse Saris | NSC | 4 July 2024 | 11 November 2025 | |
| Jesse Six Dijkstra | NSC | 6 December 2023 | 11 November 2025 | |
| Elke Slagt-Tichelman | GL-PvdA | 6 December 2023 | 11 November 2025 | |
| Peter Smitskam | PVV | 6 December 2023 | 11 November 2025 | |
| Joost Sneller | D66 | 6 December 2023 | 11 November 2025 | |
| Aant-Jelle Soepboer | NSC | 6 December 2023 | 25 July 2025 (Note: Left after being nominated as lead candidate for the Frisian National Party) | |
| Chris Stoffer | SGP | 6 December 2023 | 11 November 2025 | |
| Luc Stultiens | GL-PvdA | 6 December 2023 | 11 November 2025 | |
| Marijke Synhaeve | D66 | 12 December 2023 | 28 March 2024 | |
| Christine Teunissen | PvdD | 6 December 2023 | 11 November 2025 | |
| Folkert Thiadens | PVV | 4 July 2024 | 11 November 2025 | |
| Joris Thijssen | GL-PvdA | 6 December 2023 | 11 November 2025 | |
| Judith Tielen | VVD | 6 December 2023 | 18 June 2025 | |
| Frans Timmermans | GL-PvdA | 6 December 2023 | 11 November 2025 | |
| Mikal Tseggai | GL-PvdA | 6 December 2023 | 11 November 2025 | |
| Gijs Tuinman | BBB | 6 December 2023 | 2 July 2024 | |
| Judith Uitermark | NSC | 6 December 2023 | 2 July 2024 | |
| Nico Uppelschoten | PVV | 4 July 2024 | 11 November 2025 | |
| Jan Valize | PVV | 6 December 2023 | 11 November 2025 | |
| Eline Vedder | CDA | 6 December 2023 | 11 November 2025 | |
| Martine van der Velde | PVV | 6 December 2023 | 11 November 2025 | |
| Caspar Veldkamp | NSC | 6 December 2023 | 2 July 2024 | |
| Hester Veltman | VVD | 6 December 2023 | 11 November 2025 | |
| Ruud Verkuijlen | VVD | 14 May 2025 | 11 November 2025 | |
| Henk Vermeer | BBB | 6 December 2023 | 11 November 2025 | |
| Vincent Verouden | NSC | 2 September 2025 | 11 November 2025 | |
| Hans Vijlbrief | D66 | 6 December 2023 | 11 November 2025 | |
| Elmar Vlottes | PVV | 6 December 2023 | 11 November 2025 | |
| Marina Vondeling | PVV | 6 December 2023 | 11 November 2025 | |
| Lidewij de Vos | FvD | 16 January 2025 | 31 March 2025 | |
| Lidewij de Vos | FvD | 4 September 2025 | 11 November 2025 | |
| Henk de Vree | PVV | 6 December 2023 | 11 November 2025 | |
| Aukje de Vries | VVD | 6 December 2023 | 5 September 2025 | |
| Nicolien van Vroonhoven | NSC | 6 December 2023 | 11 November 2025 | |
| Christianne van der Wal | VVD | 6 December 2023 | 25 March 2025 (Note: Left for personal reasons) | |
| Sander van Waveren | NSC | 3 December 2024 | 11 November 2025 | |
| Merlien Welzijn | NSC | 6 December 2023 | 11 November 2025 | |
| Hanneke van der Werf | D66 | 6 December 2023 | 7 December 2023 | |
| Hanneke van der Werf | D66 | 29 March 2024 | 11 November 2025 | |
| Lisa Westerveld | GL-PvdA | 6 December 2023 | 11 November 2025 | |
| Raoul White | GL-PvdA | 6 December 2023 | 11 November 2025 | |
| Marieke Wijen-Nass | BBB | 4 July 2024 | 11 November 2025 | |
| Geert Wilders | PVV | 6 December 2023 | 11 November 2025 | |
| Natascha Wingelaar | NSC | 4 July 2024 | 11 November 2025 | |
| Dilan Yeşilgöz | VVD | 6 December 2023 | 11 November 2025 | |
| Claudia van Zanten | BBB | 6 December 2023 | 11 November 2025 | |
| Femke Zeedijk-Raeven | NSC | 6 December 2023 | 19 November 2024 | |

== See also ==
- List of candidates in the 2023 Dutch general election
