= List of candidates in the 2023 Dutch general election =

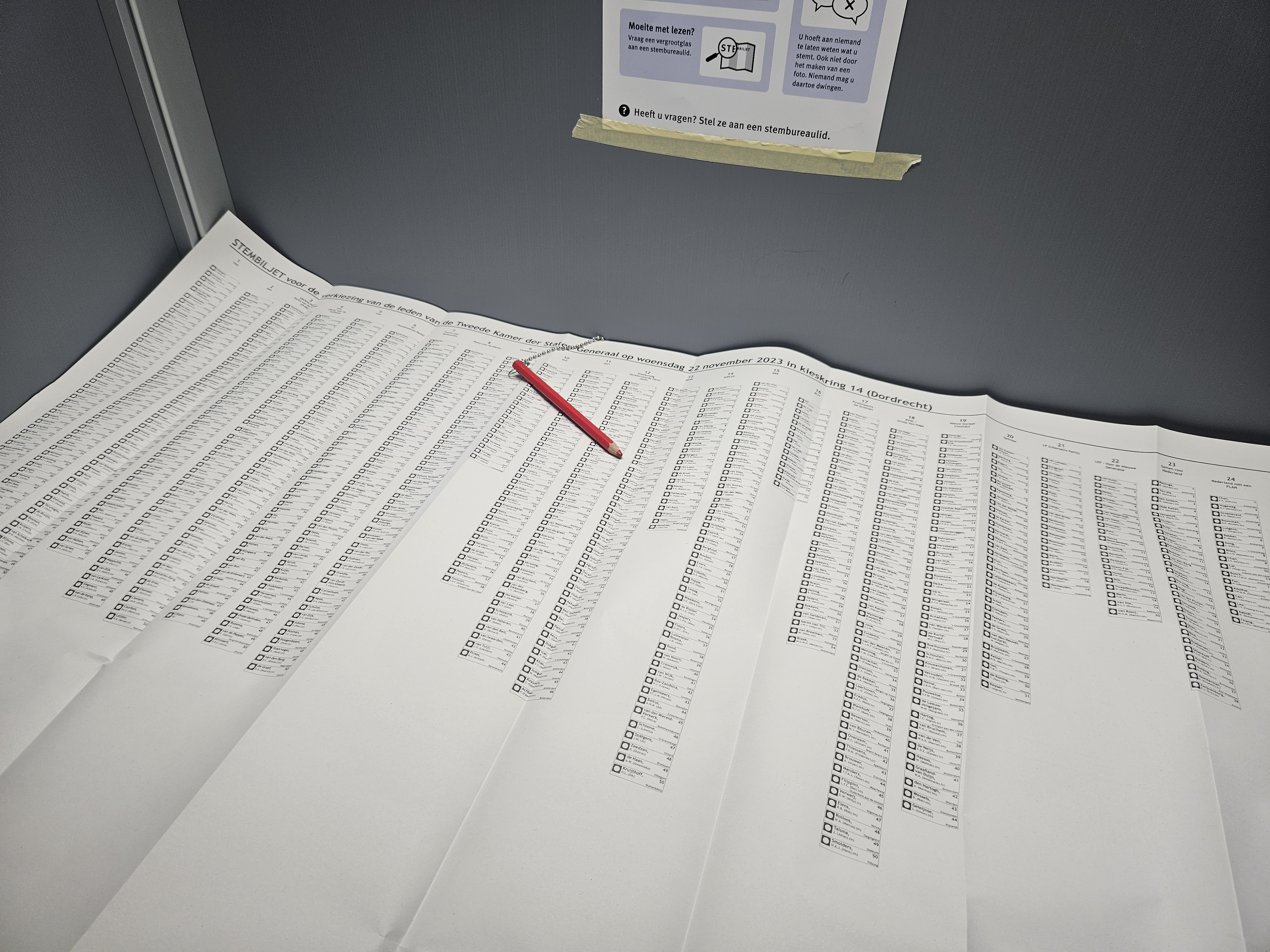
Ballot of the 2023 Dutch general election

Composition of the House of Representatives by parliamentary group: SP (5) GL-PvdA (25) PvdD (3) Denk (3) D66 (9) Volt (2) NSC (20) SGP (3) CU (3) CDA (5) VVD (24) FVD (3) BBB (7) JA21 (1) PVV (37)

For the 22 November 2023 Dutch general election, 26 electoral lists were successfully submitted, totalling 1,126 candidates.

The 150 seats of the House of Representatives were awarded to party lists, with candidates over the preference threshold awarded a seat first if available and the other seats awarded based on position on the list. The preference threshold for this election was 17,388 votes (25% of the electoral threshold). One candidate would have not been elected based on position on the list, but received enough preference votes: Daniëlle Hirsch (GroenLinks-PvdA). Replacements are also awarded based on position on the list.

The Nederlandse Omroep Stichting published an analysis of the top 20 candidates for the 18 lists that (sometimes) received seats in polling. (Note: The 18 parties were: BBB, BIJ1, BVNL, CDA, Christian Union, D66, Denk, Forum for Democracy, GroenLinks/PvdA, JA21, NSC, Party for the Animals, PVV, SGP, SP, Volt, VVD en 50PLUS) 61% of these candidates were male, 38% female and 1% non-binary. The province South Holland was overrepresented, while North Brabant and Gelderland were underrepresented. These candidates lived more often in urban areas. The average age of these candidates was 43 year. 18% had a migrant background.

== 1: People's Party for Freedom and Democracy ==
Candidate list for the People's Party for Freedom and Democracy
Position	Candidate	Votes	Result
1	Dilan Yeşilgöz	1,356,883	Elected
2	Sophie Hermans	62,320	Elected
3	Bente Becker	14,597	Elected
4	Eric van der Burg	21,763	Elected
5	Christianne van der Wal	7,456	Elected
6	Ruben Brekelmans	13,902	Elected
7	Eelco Heinen	3,159	Elected
8	Aukje de Vries	7,124	Elected
9	Roelien Kamminga	5,309	Elected
10	Mariëlle Paul	2,704	Elected
11	Silvio Erkens	6,472	Elected
12	Queeny Rajkowski	3,289	Elected
13	Thierry Aartsen	4,071	Elected
14	Thom van Campen	2,879	Elected
15	Judith Tielen	2,214	Elected
16	Hester Veltman-Kamp	1,974	Elected
17	Wendy van Eijk	5,900	Elected
18	Ulysse Ellian	2,532	Elected
19	Ingrid Michon-Derkzen	1,156	Elected
20	Claire Martens	1,548	Elected
21	Wim Meulenkamp	2,528	Elected
22	Peter de Groot	1,515	Elected
23	Arend Kisteman	1,561	Elected
24	Daan de Kort	4,472	Elected
25	Jacqueline van den Hil	3,545	Replacement
26	Peter Valstar	3,611	Declined
27	Harry Bevers	878	Replacement
28	Martijn Buijsse	1,541	Replacement
29	Rosemarijn Dral	2,990	Replacement
30	Bart Bikkers	892	Replacement
31	Ruud Verkuijlen	534	Replacement
32	Simone Richardson	1,509	Replacement
33	Martin de Beer	2,132	Replacement
34	Pim van Strien	853	
35	Jeroen Hartsuiker	981	Replacement
36	Hester Klein Lankhorst	909	
37	Erik Haverkort	1,407	
38	Chris Simons	696	
39	Yvonne Bijenhof	1,380	
40	Dieke van Groningen	3,926	Replacement
41	Ellis Zeeuw van der Laan	706	
42	Youri Volkman	585	
43	Peter van Kessel	486	
44	Hawre Rahimi	1,017	
45	Bart Omlo	473	
46	Remco Yizhak Cooremans	262	
47	Mirjam Nelisse	980	
48	Bas de Wit	1,391	
49	Mirjam van Meerten-Kok	632	
50	Barry Hoogezand	380	
51	Mark Achterbergh	467	
52	Hilde Wendel	1,589	
53	Nupur Kohli	2,368	
54	Ilona Klerks	837	
55	Herre Dijkema	648	
56	Anna Elkerbout	363	
57	Dimitri van Rijn	280	
58	Berend Aptroot	613	
59	Lilianne de Regt	221	
60	Jaap van Veen	239	
61	Marjolein Vulpes	249	
62	Jasper van Os	184	
63	Ronald van der Klauw	177	
64	Arash Rahmani	192	
65	Rick Bouma	136	
66	Anne van Berlo	633	
67	Irma Talens	521	
68	Rogier Bruin	378	
69	Trudie van 't Hull-Bettink	646	
70	Johan Gadella	228	
71	Daan Vermeulen	299	
72	Marijke van Noort-Cnossen	181	
73	Monique Van der Sanden	208	
74	Holger Rodoe	269	
75	Cas Schollink	216	
76	Ivo de Wolff	232	
77	Yldau de Boer	265	
78	Murat Yildirim	225	
79	Hilda Mulder	938	
80	Maarten van der Weijden	3,657	
Total		1,589,519	

== 2: Democrats 66 ==
Candidate list for the Democrats 66
Position	Candidate	Votes	Result
1	Rob Jetten	437,371	Elected
2	Jan Paternotte	19,645	Elected
3	Hans Vijlbrief	10,067	Elected
4	Anne-Marijke Podt	64,426	Elected
5	Joost Sneller	2,094	Elected
6	Ilana Rooderkerk	12,560	Elected
7	Wieke Paulusma	12,771	Elected
8	Hanneke van der Werf	9,840	Elected
9	Mpanzu Bamenga	4,264	Elected
10	Tjeerd de Groot	10,067	Replacement
11	Marijke Synhaeve	11,066	Replacement
12	Lisa van Ginneken	11,122	
13	Salima Belhaj	5,989	
14	Faissal Boulakjar	1,412	
15	Fonda Sahla	1,795	
16	Felix Klos	1,075	
17	Hülya Kat	1,907	
18	Sjoerd Warmerdam	580	
19	Spencer Alberg	1,022	
20	Alexander Hammelburg	548	
21	Jieskje Hollander	2,257	
22	Loes ten Dolle	580	
23	Dorien Blommers	924	
24	Carline van Breugel	1,997	
25	Hans Teunissen	896	
26	Meryem Çimen	1,261	
27	Ouafa Oualhadj	615	
28	Marvin Putuhena	304	
29	Eelco Keij	731	
30	Veerle Brink	778	
31	Paul van Dorst	553	
32	Gerben Wijnja	300	
33	Margreet de Vries	458	
34	Frank Schoonbeek	227	
35	Mahjoub Mathlouti	107	
36	Wiebe Ruttenberg	87	
37	Joey Koops	364	
38	Kiki Hagen	1,782	
39	Gerben Hiemstra	154	
40	Judith Keijmel-den Boer	511	
41	Hilde Tjeerdema	507	
42	Elze Woudstra	271	
43	Anne-Lise Olsthoorn	191	
44	Caecilia van Peski	524	
45	Bonne van Hattum	198	
46	Hind Dekker-Abdulaziz	580	
47	Marco van Driel	420	
48	Linda Ruijs	325	
49	Pieter van der Gaag	82	
50	Enrico Bosters	245	
51	Donja Hoevers	163	
52	Veerle Fleur van de Vijver	801	
53	Pepijn Vemer	117	
54	David Wallast	110	
55	Elly André	406	
56	Anne Wesseling	632	
57	Remy Maessen	279	
58	Monique Schoonen	228	
59	Pepijn Pi Van de Venne	430	
60	Marlou Jenneskens	1,130	
61	Sander Janssen	175	
62	Laura de Vries	249	
63	Sumer Chaban	204	
64	Ton Louhenapessij	126	
65	Linda Nooitmeer	488	
66	Jaimi van Essen	286	
67	Joan Nunnely	253	
68	Nazmi Türkkol	196	
69	Peter van der Voort	76	
70	Marcelle Hendrickx	303	
71	Fleur Gräper-van Koolwijk	429	
72	Franc Weerwind	210	
73	Alexandra van Huffelen	1,119	
74	Ernst Kuipers	682	
75	Kajsa Ollongren	727	
76	Robbert Dijkgraaf	3,247	
77	Gunay Uslu	658	
78	Alexander Pechtold	1,196	
79	Jan Terlouw	1,176	
80	Sigrid Kaag	5,028	
Total		656,292	

== 3: GroenLinks–PvdA ==
Common candidates in all electoral districts for the GroenLinks-PvdA
Position	Candidate	Votes	Result
1	Frans Timmermans	760,521	Elected
2	Esmah Lahlah	217,787	Elected
3	Jesse Klaver	149,437	Elected
4	Kati Piri	39,245	Elected
5	Lisa Westerveld	141,064	Elected
6	Mariëtte Patijn	11,388	Elected
7	Suzanne Kröger	25,711	Elected
8	Julian Bushoff	13,992	Elected
9	Tom van der Lee	3,561	Elected
10	Songül Mutluer	8,711	Elected
11	Laura Bromet	19,518	Elected
12	Habtamu de Hoop	20,077	Elected
13	Senna Maatoug	11,323	Elected
14	Mohammed Mohandis	3,348	Elected
15	Geert Gabriëls	8,034	Elected
16	Joris Thijssen	1,871	Elected
17	Kauthar Bouchallikht	12,879	Elected, but declined
18	Barbara Kathmann	10,665	Elected
19	Elke Slagt-Tichelman	10,333	Elected
20	Mikal Tseggai	7,035	Elected
21	Raoul White	3,192	Elected
22	Anita Pijpelink	12,340	Elected
23	Glimina Chakor	17,794	Elected
24	Jimme Nordkamp	3,051	Elected
25	Luc Stultiens	2,577	Replacement
26	Marleen Haage	16,764	Replacement
27	Daniëlle Hirsch	25,012	Elected
28	Hayte de Jong	1,359	
29	Jeroen Postma	1,166	
30	Inge Oosting	8,587	
31	Margreet de Boer	4,312	
32	Jan Daenen	1,887	
33	April Ranshuijsen	9,126	
34	Eylem Köseoglu	8,525	
35	Evelien van Roemburg	4,903	
36	Abassin Nessar	1,116	
37	Lyle Muns	1,254	
38	Iris Vrolijks	5,491	
39	Paul Smits	1,168	
40	Mohamed Nabih	1,614	
41	David Rietveld	243	
42	Yasin Torunoglu	1,607	
43	Eva de Bruijn	8,487	
44	Eline Bosman	948	
45	Charda Kuipers	2,006	
46	Marlieke van Schalkwijk	2,271	
47-50	Regional candidates		
Total		1,643,073	

=== Regional candidates (GL-PvdA) ===
==== Groningen, Leeuwarden, Assen, Zwolle ====
Regional candidates in Groningen, Leeuwarden, Assen and Zwolle for the GroenLinks-PvdA
Position	Candidate	Votes	Result
47	Romano Boshove	191	
48	Eefke Meijerink	1,729	
49	Verone de Vries	374	
50	Yara Hümmels	1,563	

==== Lelystad, Nijmegen, Arnhem, Utrecht ====
Regional candidates in Lelystad, Nijmegen, Arnhem and Utrecht for the GroenLinks-PvdA
Position	Candidate	Votes	Result
47	Jelmer Becker	754	
48	Bram Leeuwenkamp	585	
49	Valentijn Brinkman	168	
50	Fenneke van der Vegte	1,420	

==== Amsterdam, Haarlem, Den Helder ====
Regional candidates in Amsterdam, Haarlem and Den Helder for the GroenLinks-PvdA
Position	Candidate	Votes	Result
47	Giel van der Steenhoven	40	
48	Rebekka Tselms	195	
49	Paulien Gankema	345	
50	Marjolein Moorman	8,085	

==== 's-Gravenhage, Rotterdam, Dordrecht, Leiden ====
Regional candidates in 's-Gravenhage, Rotterdam, Dordrecht and Leiden for the GroenLinks-PvdA
Position	Candidate	Votes	Result
47	Bas Bijlsma	135	
48	Rembrandt Rowaan	267	
49	Paulien van der Hoeven	440	
50	Lianne van Kalken	1,006	

==== Middelburg, Tilburg, 's-Hertogenbosch, Maastricht, Bonaire ====
Regional candidates in Middelburg, Tilburg, 's-Hertogenbosch, Maastricht and Bonaire for the GroenLinks-PvdA
Position	Candidate	Votes	Result
47	Lieke van Son	1,869	
48	Anna-Lena Penninx	77	
49	Hanneke Roozendaal	319	
50	Frank van de Wolde	211	

== 4: Party for Freedom ==
Candidate list for the Party for Freedom
Position	Candidate	Votes	Result
1	Geert Wilders	2,230,371	Elected
2	Fleur Agema	117,255	Elected
3	Rachel van Meetelen	8,023	Elected
4	Gidi Markuszower	2,845	Elected
5	Martin Bosma	47,189	Elected
6	René Claassen	3,764	Elected
7	Marjolein Faber	4,390	Elected
8	Edgar Mulder	2,388	Elected
9	Vicky Maeijer	2,547	Elected
10	Teun van Dijck	557	Elected
11	Alexander Kops	845	Elected
12	Barry Madlener	693	Elected
13	Léon de Jong	1,182	Elected
14	Dion Graus	1,548	Elected
15	Reinder Blaauw	1,867	Elected
16	Raymond de Roon	477	Elected
17	Emiel van Dijk	410	Elected
18	Henk de Vree	425	Elected
19	Max Aardema	2,317	Elected
20	Martine van der Velde	2,498	Elected
21	Patrick van der Hoeff	977	Elected
22	Marco Deen	582	Elected
23	Jeanet Nijhof-Leeuw	2,541	Elected
24	Maikel Boon	693	Elected
25	Jeremy Mooiman	866	Elected
26	Dennis Ram	1,394	Elected
27	Elmar Vlottes	706	Elected
28	Peter Smitskam	240	Elected
29	Eric Esser	1,313	Elected
30	Willem Boutkan	331	Elected
31	Vincent van den Born	386	Elected
32	Patrick Crijns	953	Elected
33	Peter van Haasen	439	Elected
34	Marina Vondeling	1,589	Elected
35	Jan Valize	594	Elected
36	Hidde Heutink	846	Elected
37	Joeri Pool	296	Elected
38	Chris Faddegon	71	Replacement
39	Nico Uppelschoten	393	Replacement
40	Robert Rep	825	Replacement
41	Folkert Thiadens	181	Replacement
42	Annette Raijer	962	
43	Roel van Bijnen	425	
44	Alexander van Hattem	416	
45	Gom van Strien	1,230	
Total		2,450,878	

== 5: Christian Democratic Appeal ==
Candidate list for the Christian Democratic Appeal
Position	Candidate	Votes	Result
1	Henri Bontenbal	279,272	Elected
2	Eline Vedder	19,269	Elected
3	Derk Boswijk	3,217	Elected
4	Inge van Dijk	8,701	Elected
5	Harmen Krul	2,618	Elected
6	Hilde Palland-Mulder	2,818	
7	Bart van den Brink	912	
8	Marlou Absil	3,857	
9	Hanneke Steen	1,817	
10	Anne Kuik	1,980	
11	Jouke Spoelstra	4,768	
12	Evert Jan Slootweg	351	
13	Saida Chaoui-Nhass	301	
14	Jantine Zwinkels	1,004	
15	Ralph Diederen	3,740	
16	Sarath Hamstra	353	
17	Easther Houmes	832	
18	Chantal van den Berg	601	
19	Jalt de Haan	701	
20	Jenny Vermeer	786	
21	Liesbeth van der Heide	561	
22	Johan Goos	278	
23	Paul Boogaard	211	
24	Wieke Goudzwaard-Wiersma	524	
25	René Segers-Hoogendoorn	210	
26	Arjen Kier van Gijssel	543	
27	Lennard Goudriaan	130	
28	Mart van Lagen	160	
29	Marieke van der Spek	559	
30	Floris Out	441	
31	Jacky Silos	173	
32	Yusuf Tuncer	122	
33	Chantal Broekhuis	88	
34	Antoine van den Oever	86	
35	Joba van den Berg	151	
36	Antje Beers	605	
37	Delano van Luik	212	
38	Bart van Dekken	86	
39	Stef Luijten	526	
40	Harma Drost	135	
41	Frank Buijs	136	
42	Laura van de Giessen	328	
43	Dani Bracke	464	
44	Jan Joosten	228	
45	Pien Meppelink	320	
46	Robert van Dijk	109	
47	Franko van Lankvelt	99	
48	Arjen Siegmann	112	
49	Lody van de Kamp	327	
Total		345,822	

== 6: Socialist Party ==
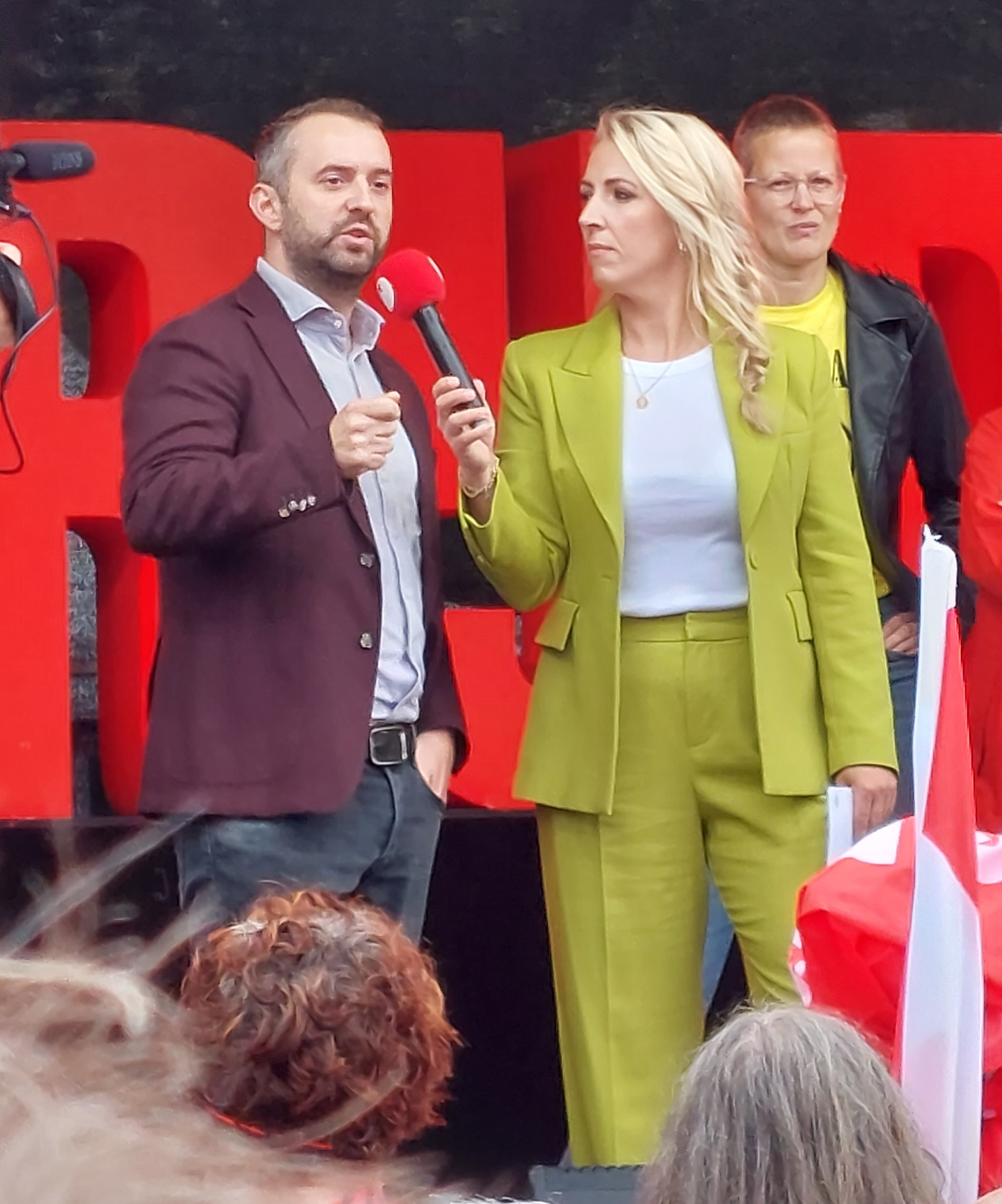
Socialist Party lead candidate Lilian Marijnissen (right) with the fourth candidate on the list, Jimmy Dijk (left), on 17 September 2023.

Candidate list for the Socialist Party
Position	Candidate	Votes	Result
1	Lilian Marijnissen	273,734	Elected
2	Sandra Beckerman	15,988	Elected
3	Bart van Kent	1,580	Elected
4	Jimmy Dijk	2,633	Elected
5	Michiel van Nispen	1,677	Elected
6	Sarah Dobbe	4,629	Replacement
7	Nicole Temmink	2,865	
8	Mathijs ten Broeke	929	
9	Jasper van Dijk	1,641	
10	Bastiaan Meijer	556	
11	Gerrie Elfrink	311	
12	Jorge Wolters Gregório	840	
13	Hans Boerwinkel	508	
14	Remine Alberts	1,347	
15	Harre van der Nat	252	
16	Murat Memiş	1,037	
17	Debbie van Dijk	841	
18	Nina de Ridder	743	
19	Jamila Yahyaoui	1,607	
20	Bram van Boven	332	
21	Thijs Coppus	170	
22	Xander Topma	235	
23	Tijmen van Wijngaarden	107	
24	Theo Coşkun	563	
25	Sebastiaan van den Hout	74	
26	Niels van der Wijk	148	
27	Inge Verdaasdonk	616	
28	Lieke van Rossum	494	
29	Kristie Rongen	209	
30	Hans van Hooft jr.	303	
31	Anne Cramer	221	
32	Eduard van Scheltinga	69	
33	Ger van Unen	257	
34	Ruud Kuin	101	
35	Dane Harris	90	
36	Jan van der Veen	247	
37	Simon Zandvliet	169	
38	Alexandra Spanner	377	
39	Madeleine Boer	123	
40	Janet Ramesar	412	
41	Mariska ten Heuw	388	
42	Joost van der Sluis	53	
43	Aldo Schelvis	262	
44	Willem de Man	155	
45	Anita Hendriks-Berg	602	
46	Erik de Vries	235	
47	Eelco Eikenaar	64	
48	Jordy Clemens	369	
49	Pierre Courbois	102	
50	Renske Leijten	6,960	
Total		328,225	

== 7: Forum for Democracy ==
Candidate list for the Forum for Democracy
Position	Candidate	Votes	Result
1	Thierry Baudet	163,881	Elected
2	Freek Jansen	3,456	Elected
3	Gideon van Meijeren	45,361	Elected
4	Pepijn van Houwelingen	5,608	Replacement
5	Ralf Dekker	4,144	Replacement
6	Lidewij de Vos	2,200	Replacement
7	Tom Russcher	246	
8	Massimo Etalle	128	
9	Andreas Bakir	971	
10	Johan Dessing	162	
11	Joyce Vastenhouw	142	
12	Iem al Biyati	234	
13	Rebecca de Knegt	147	
14	Peter Verstegen	133	
15	Anton van Schijndel	38	
16	Brigitte Antolini	79	
17	Martin Bos	111	
18	Pelle Koopman	66	
19	Ramon van Asch	89	
20	Marco van den Boomgaard	152	
21-27	Regional candidates		
28	Brent Hadderingh	36	
29	Jelle Wittebrood	60	
30	Tanay Bilgin	84	
31	Gino Luurssen	98	
32	Jozef Minkels	57	
33	Theo Heller	42	
34	Jelena Postuma	267	
35	Vincent Vos	69	
36	Moriah Hartman	43	
37	Tommy Panis	54	
38	Jasper van der Voort	52	
39	Mark Nijman	90	
40	Michael Wijngaard	60	
41	Sem van Rij	48	
42	Esmeralda van Run	24	
43	Hans van de Breevaart	304	
44	Regional candidates		
45	Marcel de Graaff	71	
46	Tom Zwitser	394	
47	Joris van den Oetelaar	37	
48	Simone Kerseboom	407	
49	Paul Cliteur	319	
Total		232,963	

=== Regional candidates (FvD) ===
Regional candidates for the Forum for Democracy
Candidate	Votes	Position per electoral district																			
Candidate	Votes	1	2	3	4	5	6	7	8	9	10	11	12	13	14	15	16	17	18	19	20
Shahin Akasi	12									24											
Marianne Akkermans-Linssen	21																		25		
Leroy Alberts	25										25										
Ted Baas	46	26	26																		
Seppe Bakker	26												26	26	26	23					
Erny Bergman	19				25	26															
Elias Bernard	16								24												
Janco Bethlehem	44																	26	22		
Yolande Boom	34																		21		
Frank van Breukelen	33								21												
Cynthia Brown	29														24						
Samantha Bruinsma	8									26											
Kees Claassen	25						23	23													
Isabelle Claerhoudt	17																21				
Karine De Potter	34					22															
Albert van Dijk	35		21																		
Patty van Dinther-Spoek	51																	25	24		
Jan Leonard Epema	106	21																			
Nanne Feenstra	49	23	23																		
Brian Geertshuis	43				23																
Malou Genet	10									23											
Yvonne de Graaff	22								23												
Cirano van Haarlem	6								26	22											
Babette Hak	33						22														
Bren de Hartog	56								22												
Lars Heuvelmans	46																			24	
Hans Hodde	15					24															
Erik Hoogzand	41														22						22
Philip van Houten	8												22	25							
Nancy IJspeerd	46							22													
Anita van Iperen	26						21	21													
Jay Irfan	76												24	22							
Sascha Jacobs	109																			21	21
N.J.M. Janssen	1																	24			
Hylke Jellema	61	25	25																		
Ewald Kegel	8														25	21	26				
Arjan Kleine	35			24																	
Nicolas Knoester	81																	23	23		23
Floris van der Knoop	5										24	25									25
Pim Kooke	71																	21		26	26
Dennis Korpel	32						25	25													
Armin Krijgsman	42	24	24																		
Theo Kwakman	18											27									
Anton de Lange	31	27	27	27	27	27	27	27	27	27	26		27	27	27	27	27	27		27	27
Maurien van der Linde	11															26					
Ivy van der Linden	13												21	24							
Thijmen Lindner	4																		27		
Vera Lubbers	19			25																	
Rob Lute	42										22										
Cathy van Manen	44						24	24													
Fouad el Massoudi	19			26																	
Lambert van Meijeren	93						26	26													
Claire Middelkoop	7									21		26									
Giovanni Mierop	37														23						
Walther Muurmans	12																			23	
Bram Nab	59																		26	22	
Liesbeth Niessink	21			22																	
Julia Olivier	3										27										
Ardi Oostdijk	58												23	21							
Daniel Osseweijer	17			23	26																
Kevin Oudhuis	64		22																		
Ruby Pichel	36														21						
Ksenija Provoost	24																23				24
Wouter Ravenshorst	48				22																
Nic Redelinghuys	27												25	23							
Remco Roelofs	23				21																
David Schaap	71	44	44	44	44	44	44	44	44	44	44	44	44	44	44	44	44	44	44	44	
Milan Schenk	50															22					44
Camille Scholtz	17								25												
Nicole Seldenthuis-Jetten	103																			25	
Simone van Slot	20					23															
Thiemo Smit	51											21									
Annelies Strikkers	60				24	25															
Deborah Tollenaar	39										21	22									
Andy van Veen	3									25											
Hendrikus Velzing	64			21																	
Filine Verloop	35															24					
Niels Visser	11																25				
Angela Werner	26																22				
Robin Westdijk	30															25					
Kim Winkelaar	39	22																			
René Woensdregt	33					21															
Marnix van Woudenberg	89																	22			
Fred Zandee	16																24				
Tim van der Zwaart	28										23	24									

== 8: Party for the Animals ==
Candidate list for the Party for the Animals
Position	Candidate	Votes	Result
1	Esther Ouwehand	160,460	Elected
2	Ines Kostić	15,232	Elected
3	Christine Teunissen	7,722	Elected
4	Frank Wassenberg	3,618	
5	Eva Akerboom	7,064	
6	Lammert van Raan	2,150	
7	Martine van Schaik	4,359	
8	Anna Krijger	9,142	
9	Pascale Plusquin	2,143	
10	Pieter Groenewege	670	
11	Maarten van Heuven	576	
12	Falco van Hassel	740	
13	Rosalie Bunnik	1,528	
14	Hanneke Schmeets	544	
15	Kıvılcım Pınar	1,406	
16	Malcolm Jones	696	
17	Janette Bosma	3,329	
18	Robert Barker	147	
19	Kjell van Wijlandt	225	
20	Jesseka Batteau	456	
21	Jaap Hollebeek	206	
22	Iris Dicke	593	
23	Bart Salemans	481	
24	Freek Bersch	150	
25	Frank de Gram	249	
26	Lotte Krediet	549	
27	Dave de Vos	588	
28	Myra van der Velde	413	
29	Carla van Viegen	236	
30	Leonie Gerritsen	396	
31	Marjolijn Veenstra	318	
32	Anne-Miep Vlasveld	763	
33	Trees Janssens	460	
34	Pinar Coşkun	909	
35	Lester van der Pluijm	111	
36	Siska Peeks	343	
37	Cynthia Pallandt	524	
38	Wesley Pechler	312	
39	Janneke van Lierop	355	
40	Vivianne Spruit	466	
41	Bart Kuijer	101	
42	Gaby Markandu	1,010	
43	Joeri Oudshoorn	60	
44	Radjan Hanoeman	408	
45	Eileen Samshuijzen	500	
46	Menno Brouwer	308	
47	Suzanne Onderdelinden	295	
48	Jaap Rozema	271	
49	Sabrina van de Peppel	363	
50	Xenia Minnaert	1,112	
Total		235,148	

== 9: Christian Union ==
Candidate list for the Christian Union
Position	Candidate	Votes	Result
1	Mirjam Bikker	158,057	Elected
2	Pieter Grinwis	4,449	Elected
3	Don Ceder	11,213	Elected
4	Alwin te Rietstap	3,665	
5	Joëlle Gooijer-Medama	4,950	
6	Nico Drost	2,295	
7	Tobias Holtman	947	
8	Cora Otter-van den Bosch	1,273	
9	Stieneke van der Graaf	10,498	
10	Michel Klein	396	
11	Carlijn Niesink	1,020	
12	Jerke Setz	711	
13	Christian van der Krift	486	
14	Arjan Langen	284	
15	Lizo Koppejan	549	
16	Elly van Wageningen	413	
17	Bert Tijhof	434	
18	Wouter de Reus	270	
19	Gaetan Mbwete	763	
20	Mark Treurniet	352	
21	Arend Palland	345	
22	Bettelies Westerbeek	313	
23	IJmert Muilwijk	170	
24	Judith Westerink-Petersen	291	
25	Ingeborg Dijkstra-Verbeek	332	
26	Gert van den Berg	247	
27	Alma Broekmaat-Hagens	266	
28	Thera de Haan	241	
29	Arjan Koerts	183	
30	Annebeth Roor-Wubs	334	
31	Jan Pieter Verweij	201	
32	Ingrid Paalman-Dijkenga	194	
33	Anil Kumar	144	
34	Eva Kerklaan-van der Beek	218	
35	Joël Visser	154	
36	Lieuwe van der Pol	148	
37	Antrude Oudman	195	
38	Jarin van der Zande	181	
39	Gilco Grandia	104	
40	Sara van Oordt-Jonckheere	334	
41	Bertus Cornelissen	164	
42	Nathalie Nede	230	
43	Jan Willem Schutte	134	
44	Gerben van Dijk	241	
45	Piet Adema	224	
46	Frank Bosman	104	
47	Eline Hoogenboom	438	
48	Henk Stoorvogel	1,363	
49	Reinier van den Berg	388	
50	Beatrice de Graaf	1,626	
Total		212,532	

== 10: Volt Netherlands ==
Candidate list for the Volt Netherlands
Position	Candidate	Votes	Result
1	Laurens Dassen	97,999	Elected
2	Marieke Koekkoek	38,747	Elected
3	Ernst Boutkan	2,263	
4	Imane Elfilali	10,900	
5	Martijn Hagoort	798	
6	Romy Frijters	7,296	
7	Rens de Boer	1,240	
8	Sanne van der Lugt	4,330	
9	Bjorn Beijnon	1,459	
10	Robin Twickler	4,284	
11	Cankut Ercan	1,197	
12	Julia Hamel	1,123	
13	Willem van Ewijk	353	
14	Sylvia van Laar	1,208	
15	Michael Tai	332	
16	Valérie Pajak	1,539	
17	Floris Eigenhuis	598	
18	Eveline Verbeek	1,274	
19	Bart Hemmes	222	
20	Dianne Elsinga	1,012	
21	Sjoerd Dreteler	628	
Total		178,802	

== 11: JA21 ==
Candidate list for the JA21
Position	Candidate	Votes	Result
1	Joost Eerdmans	53,675	Elected
2	Annabel Nanninga	10,132	
3	Simon Ceulemans	424	
4	Elrie Bakker-Derks	1,137	
5	Don van Doorn	215	
6	Maarten Goudzwaard	539	
7	Philippe Schyns	520	
8	Kelly Uiterwijk	558	
9	Ronald Dijksterhuis	223	
10	Daniël van den Berg	218	
11	Harry Omlo	279	
12	Stijn Hesselink	233	
13	Kevin Nuijten	149	
14	Servaas Roos	198	
15	Maryam Soltani	154	
16	Leon Baten	50	
17	Hans Kövi	52	
18	Luuk Wilson	61	
19	Thom van Vugt	83	
20	Annemoon Wanders	164	
21	Ilona Lodders	251	
22	Bart Vos	94	
23	Frank Kauffmann	186	
24	Marco de Rijke	150	
25	Geert Hoogendoorn	103	
26	Cynthia Gordijn	333	
27	Jorik Bloemenkamp	174	
28	Jan-Willem Waitz	81	
29	Alberto Veenvliet	86	
30	Jan-Martin Koetje	166	
31	Marc Buijs	37	
32	Ronald Buijt	19	
33	Martin Kersten	59	
34	Gabe de Groot	72	
35	Kishoor Hieralal	39	
36	Roy Blijlevens	123	
37	Marco Pastors	54	
38	Simon Fortuijn	254	
Total		71,345	

== 12: Reformed Political Party ==
Candidate list for the Reformed Political Party
Position	Candidate	Votes	Result
1	Chris Stoffer	188,755	Elected
2	Diederik van Dijk	5,776	Elected
3	André Flach	3,030	Elected
4	Nathanaël Middelkoop	5,491	
5	Wouter Jan Vroegindeweij	1,414	
6	Harry van der Maas	900	
7	Henk van der Wind	1,507	
8	Dick Both	632	
9	Jan Kloosterman	557	
10	Rody van Heijst	527	
11	Adriaan van der Wulp	366	
12	Harm Jan Polinder	533	
13	Maarten Slingerland	421	
14	Wim van Duijn	328	
15	Leo Barth	268	
16	Johnny Lukasse	410	
17	Hans Tanis	269	
18	Ewart Bosma	571	
19	Geert Schipaanboord	283	
20	Joost Veldman	142	
21	Jan Hartog	223	
22	Tom Koekoek	378	
23	Leendert de Knegt	374	
24	Gert van Leeuwen	214	
25	Tom Bakker	218	
26	Wim Kok	189	
27	Steven van Westreenen	225	
28	Peter Noordergraaf	183	
29	Ardjan Boersma	176	
30	Lubbert Talen	247	
31	Rick van de Waerdt	112	
32	Henk Bulten	183	
33	Arnold Versteeg	424	
34	Lambert Kisteman	97	
35	Lourens van Bruchem	168	
36	Bertrick van den Dikkenberg	127	
37	Hendrik Herweijer	302	
38	Gert van Laar	170	
39	André Scheppink	210	
40	Ruben van Heteren	105	
41	Bernard van den Belt	166	
42	Daniël van Iwaarden	174	
43	Leendert van Tuijl	134	
44	Arnoud Proos	352	
Total		217,270	

== 13: Denk ==
Candidate list for the Denk
Position	Candidate	Votes	Result
1	Stephan van Baarle	161,730	Elected
2	Doğukan Ergin	15,428	Elected
3	Ismail el Abassi	20,372	Elected
4	Aalâa Alrubey	5,799	
5	Emel Gün	3,735	
6	Yıldırım Usta	3,456	
7	Nancy Rijssel	1,432	
8	Abdul Maroof	1,992	
9	Yaw Mac Intosch	895	
10	Mehmet Safranti	2,069	
11	Can Bayrakci	1,278	
12	Ibrahim Ghazi	2,362	
13	Selim Özçelik	2,228	
14	Ahmet Kaya	2,573	
15	Ayşe Konuksever-Tekin	1,312	
16	Omar Fkihi	691	
17	Tahsin Çetinkaya	2,561	
18	Erdoğan Şahin	542	
19	Cemil Kahramanoğlu	322	
20	Çaner Kaplan	345	
21	Emma Manhoef	484	
22	Celil Tan	352	
23	Furkan Kondu	321	
24	Iskender Şimşek	335	
25	Funda Ileri	798	
26	Hassan Buyatui	409	
27	Mila van Burik	203	
28	Nizaam Muradin	515	
29	Ilker Delener	207	
30	Safa Sodirijo	276	
31	Aysel Ağirbaş	346	
32	Ramazan Özcan	667	
33	Juzoef Tangali	541	
34	Ramzy Othman	865	
35	Ahmet Yildirim	920	
36	Naoufal Akhatab	782	
37	Mounir Ben Touhami	838	
38	Mustafa Bal	765	
39	Şebnem Pancar	208	
40	Salih Akça	331	
41	Şeyda Dokgöz	364	
42	Nur Icar	602	
43	Sheher Khan	938	
44	Mahmut Sungur	1,400	
45	Süleyman Koyuncu	793	
46	Faouzi Achbar	1,383	
Total		246,765	

== 14: 50PLUS ==
Candidate list for the 50PLUS
Position	Candidate	Votes	Result
1	Gerard van Hooft	31,254	
2	Marc van Rooij	1,868	
3	Janfrans Brouwers	1,100	
4	Mieke Hoek	7,831	
5	Ruud van Acquoij	710	
6	Adriana Hernández Martínez	2,351	
7	Jan Fonhof	460	
8	Henk van Tilborg	629	
9	Joop van Orsouw	280	
10	Sander Faassen	467	
11	Johan Hessing	294	
12	Jörg Jablonski	121	
13	Hans Bongers	212	
14	Ad Franse	245	
15	John van Loon	325	
16	Frank de Kruif	124	
17	Janwillem van Es	553	
18	Robert Biever	163	
19	Klaas Hamersma	395	
20	Martin Hornis	316	
21	Jan van Aert	180	
22	Frans Vriens	131	
23	John Voets	342	
24	Jan Hendriks	692	
Total		51,043	

== 15: Farmer–Citizen Movement ==
Common candidates in all electoral districts for the Farmer–Citizen Movement (BBB)
Position	Candidate	Votes	Result
1	Caroline van der Plas	387,494	Elected
2	Mona Keijzer	43,005	Elected
3	Gijs Tuinman	5,834	Elected
4	Henk Vermeer	2,526	Elected
5	Lilian Helder	4,518	Elected
6	Cor Pierik	2,181	Elected
7	Claudia van Zanten	1,760	Elected
8	Jean Rummenie	342	
9	Nicki Pouw-Verweij	2,469	Declined
10	Mariska Rikkers	2,656	Replacement
11	Marieke Wijen-Nass	2,744	Replacement
12	Martin Oostenbrink	281	Replacement
13	Jasper Rekers	862	
14	Alexander Hendriks	417	
15	Christine Govaert	1,784	
16	Laurens van Vliet	959	
17	Herma Hemmen	3,019	
18	Kees van Vuuren	548	
19	Saskia van der Meer	1,284	
20	Kitty Stoop	703	
21	Andrea van Veen	632	
22	Jan-Sebastian van Lissum	167	
23	Erik Stegink	2,032	
24	Florian Huiskamp	1,096	
25	Derk Jan Eppink	552	
26	Regional candidates	449	
27	Nils Berghout	190	
28	Gerlof Roubos	559	
29	Jordy Evers	342	
30	Marcel Sijbolts	342	
31	Willem Poppe	430	
32	Jan Swaag	526	
33	Derk-Evert Waalkens	885	
34	Ines de Ridder	457	
35	Wim Jaspers	812	
36	Eric Floors	132	
37	Joke Luitwieler-Bosma	304	
38	Inge Rood	350	
39	Madelon van Noort	202	
40	Koos Cromwijk	351	
41	Jeroen van Wijk	250	
42	Lianne Bos-Zandstra	559	
43	Nicole Egelmeers	447	
44	Ad Baltus	288	
45	Petra van der Wereld-Verkerk	217	
46	Loretta Schoone	343	
47	Jo Spätgens	330	
48	Duncan Zeedzen	135	
49-50	Regional candidates		
Total		485,551	

=== Regional candidates (BBB) ===
Regional candidates for the Farmer–Citizen Movement
Candidate	Votes	Position per electoral district																			
Candidate	Votes	1	2	3	4	5	6	7	8	9	10	11	12	13	14	15	16	17	18	19	20
Niels Beijers	87					49															
Joost Bleiji	93															50					
Sander Bouma	511		49																		
Dirk Buis	423																		50		
Ellis Bulk	5												49								
Werner Eussen	79																			49	
Monique Flipsen-Verhagen	296																	50			
Annemieke de Haan	126														49	49					
Haidy Hankers	449	26	26	26	26	26	26	26	26	26	26	26	26	26	26	26	26		26	26	26
Hans Hartholt	114				49													26			
Marco Havermans	224																	49			
Walter Hellebrand	105									49											49
John Huizing	289																			50	
Mariëlle de Jong	110													49							
Siddartha Karaya	95								50												
Gina Kattenberg	97									50	50										
Sebastiaan Keijmel	115																49				
Klaas Kiewiet	188	49																			
Cees Kramer	46										49										
Dik Kruijthoff	165												50	50	50						
Petra van Kuilenberg	186						49														
Evert Lassche	162											49									
Robbert Lievense	180																50				
Tim van der Mark	251											50									
Gouke Moes	200	50																			
Joost Olthof	856							49													
Harry Schuiling	199			49																	
Hugo Smink	75								49												
Auke Talsma	496		50																		
Richard Vedder	206					50	50	50													
Robert Verhulst	184																		49		
Robbert Wielink	209			50																	
Sanne Winkels	284				50																

== 16: BIJ1 ==
Candidate list for the BIJ1
Position	Candidate	Votes	Result
1	Edson Olf	16,906	
2	Lisa McCray	9,495	
3	Latifa Salmi	3,476	
4	Grace Courtar	1,423	
5	Evita de Miranda	1,524	
6	Liyah Park Berend	3,364	
7	Yvette Luhrs	1,297	
8	Yuval Gal	344	
9	Jesse ten Caat	150	
10	Joana Zandee	919	
11	Dylan Lennox Bakker	431	
12	Renske Wienen	915	
13	D. Bijleveld	1,390	
14	Romana Vrede	1,499	
15	Rebekka Timmer	1,120	
Total		44,253	

== 17: Pirate Party–The Greens ==
Candidate list for the Pirate Party–The Greens
Position	Candidate	Votes	Result
1	Mark van Treuren	4,551	
2	Saira Sadloe	1,456	
3	Reina van Zwoll	526	
4	Matthijs Pontier	1,456	
5	Wietze Brandsma	148	
6	Otto ter Haar	112	
7	Kirsten Zimmerman	222	
8	Mirjam van Rijn	183	
9	Paul Berendsen	26	
10	Sepehr Yadegari	61	
11	Angeline Pot	169	
12	Danny Werner	20	
13	David van Deijk	144	
14	Steven Russchenberg	35	
15	Dylan Hallegraeff	73	
16	Arjan Bresser	110	
17	Astrid Abendroth	81	
18	Pejman Darvish-Zadeh	43	
19	Dmitri Schrama	45	
20	Leontien Werner-Wafelman	71	
21	Branislav Plesa	30	
22	Edy Bouma	51	
23	Catharina Bethlehem	154	
24	Stefan Dekkers	41	
25	Teunis van Nes	39	
26	André Linnenbank	37	
27	Peter Braun	68	
28	Rijndert Doting	9	
29	Nico Teders	16	
30	Tom Bakkers	20	
31	Jaap van Gelderen	19	
32	Jaap van Till	56	
33	Wies van Breemen	52	
34	Metje Blaak	165	
Total		9,117	

== 18: Interest of the Netherlands ==
Candidate list for the Interest of the Netherlands
Position	Candidate	Votes	Result
1	Wybren van Haga	37,472	
2	Henk Krol	1,472	
3	Sieta van Keimpema	4,284	
4	René Dercksen	166	
5	Nynke Koopmans - van der Veen	977	
6	Roy van Aalst	240	
7	Imke Emons	634	
8	Shohreh Shahbazi Fishtali	557	
9	Arjan de Kok	74	
10	Hans van Tellingen	252	
11	Peter van der Velden	153	
12	Yernaz Ramautarsing	173	
13	Carmen Bosscher	317	
14	Harry Wijnschenk	81	
15	Sven-Åke Hulleman	1,756	
16	Arjen Schuiling	119	
17	Tjitske Aline van der Veen	126	
18	Patrick Schilder	178	
19	Siebe Jan Vogelzang	74	
20	Robert Pestman	205	
21	Stefanie Vulders	262	
22	Daniëlle van der Wiele	75	
23	Robert Brunke	102	
24	Mirjam Gorter-de Vos	109	
25	Elbert van Dalen	89	
26	Kevin Wiersma	46	
27	Pascal van Kassel	33	
28	Grite Wymenga-Kooistra	70	
29	Saul Jonk	33	
30	Cor Zuidema	46	
31	Camiel van der Meeren	43	
32	Charlotte Marie Mensing	111	
33	Frederique Durlacher	68	
34	Iwan Dienjes	84	
35	Maikel de Bekker	31	
36	Onno Laarhoven	33	
37	Roos Eradus	55	
38	Roel Westhoff	115	
39	Marco Beverloo	34	
40	Meindert van Buuren	53	
41	Alistair Overeem	852	
42	Frederike Thiessens	115	
43	Arjan Brouwer	55	
44	Toine Manders	218	
45	Bas Filippini	59	
46	Willy Verweij	53	
47	Rob Elens	415	
48	Marcus Rolloos	24	
49	Johan Talsma	71	
50	Hans Smolders	249	
Total		52,913	

== 19: New Social Contract ==
Candidate list for the New Social Contract
Position	Candidate	Votes	Result
1	Pieter Omtzigt	1,203,181	Elected
2	Nicolien van Vroonhoven-Kok	44,045	Elected
3	Judith Uitermark	10,895	Elected
4	Caspar Veldkamp	2,386	Elected
5	Sandra Palmen	7,577	Elected
6	Eddy van Hijum	3,457	Elected
7	Aant-Jelle Soepboer	10,161	Elected
8	Agnes Joseph	2,348	Elected
9	Jesse Six Dijkstra	1,658	Elected
10	Merlien Welzijn	3,496	Elected
11	Wytske Postma	1,169	Elected
12	Femke Zeedijk-Raeven	5,197	Elected
13	Folkert Idsinga	504	Elected
14	Daniëlle Jansen	6,188	Elected
15	Tjebbe van Oostenbruggen	525	Elected
16	Isa Kahraman	3,357	Elected
17	Rosanne Hertzberger	4,613	Elected
18	Faith Bruyning	1,529	Elected
19	Olger van Dijk	838	Elected
20	Harm Holman	1,378	Elected
21	Diederik Boomsma	1,316	Replacement
22	Annemarie Heite	6,457	Replacement
23	Ilse Saris	6,082	Replacement
24	Natascha Wingelaar	4,923	Replacement
25	Willem Koops	213	Replacement
26	Nora Achahbar	1,373	
27	Sander van Waveren	180	Replacement
28	Ria de Korte	656	Replacement
29	Nathaly Boelhouwer	721	
30	Marco Schouten	172	
31	Bram Kouwenhoven	144	Replacement
32	Vincent Verouden	99	Replacement
33	Bart-Jan Heine	834	
34	Simon Pouwelse	247	
35	Margreet de Leeuw-Jongejans	1,066	
36	Ingrid Hartog	392	
37	Ronald van Bruchem	254	
38	Marcel van de Ven	97	
39	Esmée de Neijs	717	
40	Wahhab Hassoo	701	
41	Annemarie Graafland-van Duijn	859	
42	Marinus den Hartogh	467	
43	Rob Wessels	270	
44	Simon Geleijnse	545	
Total		1,343,287	

== 20: Splinter ==
Candidate list for Splinter
Position	Candidate	Votes	Result
1	Femke Merel van Kooten-Arissen	9,461	
2	Nienke Ipenburg	1,029	
3	Thijs Bogers	186	
4	Jeroen Vos	168	
5	Marcel Jansma	72	
6	Niek Mu'ayyed Mir-Damádi	92	
7	Novella Rasenberg	314	
8	Paul Janssen	73	
9	Yasmine van der Weide	184	
10	Eduard Wehnes	58	
11	Ralph de Backer	36	
12	Anne Hoedeman	158	
13	Bryan Rechards	39	
14	Jeroen Weyers	106	
15	Gilia van Dam	97	
16	Jean-Christophe Abrahams	38	
17	Dick Kuin	22	
18	Marie Claire Gerritsen	31	
19	Laura Leijendekkers	61	
20	Tycho de Ruiter	106	
21	Gerard Pijnenburg	46	
22	Marise Schot	60	
23	Nora Ezendam	54	
24	Laura Peeters	82	
25	Dion de Groot	15	
26	Magda van den Heuvel-Łuczycki	38	
27	Patrick Bruijstens	14	
28	Marvin Keizer	29	
29	Tijmen Gol	21	
30	Tom de Koning	40	
31	Ingrid Keyser	108	
Total		12,838	

== 21: Libertarian Party ==
Candidate list for the Libertarian Party
Position	Candidate	Votes	Result
1	Tom van Lamoen	2,953	
2	Bart Burggraaf	127	
3	Pasqual Verhagen	121	
4	Johan Zijlstra	43	
5	Jip Meijer	52	
6	Tom Huijs	51	
7	Simone Pailer	322	
8	Lex Loman	36	
9	Gerard van den Brink	33	
10	Quintus Backhuijs	64	
11	Pallieter Koopmans	26	
12	Klaas Wassenaar	51	
13	Martijn Noortman	27	
14	Pieter Visser	32	
15	Rody Mens	69	
16	Mik Brokke	16	
17	Rik Kleinsmit	35	
18	Peter Hartkamp	38	
19	Erik Vermeulen	56	
Total		4,152	

== 22: LEF – For the New Generation ==
Candidate list for the LEF – For the New Generation
Position	Candidate	Votes	Result
1	Daniël van Duijn	2,104	
2	Nuria Zantman	1,340	
3	Zoë Neijts	372	
4	Madelief Wijnker	291	
5	Jip Bloem	104	
6	Rogier van Westerlaak	29	
7	Yumiko van Diest	80	
8	Wail Kherrazi	55	
9	Iva Pont	74	
10	Didier Torres Noordenbos	25	
11	Manu Gunning	33	
12	Mar Berends	43	
13	Leia Pickkers	77	
14	Shirley Sjiem-Fat	81	
15	Pieter Hulst	30	
16	Linda Bijl	60	
17	Merlijn Twaalfhoven	60	
18	Niraï Melis	70	
19	Britte van Die	79	
20	Martin van Rooij	115	
Total		5,122	

== 23: Together for the Netherlands ==
Candidate list for the Together for the Netherlands
Position	Candidate	Votes	Result
1	Michael Reijinga	2,497	
2	Samira You-ala	691	
3	Welmer ten Seldam	83	
4	Denzel Olde Kalter	69	
5	Mark Verspeek	110	
6	Jan Huzen	582	
7	Laurens Buijs	39	
8	Nathalie Vaneker	205	
9	Micha Kuiper	53	
10	Vincent Berndsen	21	
11	Martijn Bosman	64	
12	Daniël van den Berg	69	
13	Joop Dekker	47	
14	Mandy Seijffert-Wubbels	68	
15	Robert Korving	29	
16	Bianca Wagt	66	
17	Daniëla van der Pluijm	56	
18	Melissa Verspeek	63	
19	Marwin Ebbers	23	
20	Brigitte Timmer	57	
21	Marco Ijben	34	
22	Sharon Bink	54	
23	Frederik Roebersen	49	
24	Ria Ottenhof	65	
25	Arian Honders	38	
26	Alicia Huijing	46	
27	Elizabeth Heesterman	53	
28	Eric Zwijnenburg	94	
Total		5,325	

== 24: Netherlands with a Plan ==
Candidate list for the Netherlands with a Plan
Position	Candidate	Votes	Result
1	Kok Chan	3,399	
2	Michèle Hogeweg	636	
3	René Groeneveld	112	
4	Kimbel Bouwman	58	
5	Serge Lutgens	53	
6	Ricky Bakker	56	
7	Lili Dong	295	
8	Maureen Riley	120	
9	Shirley Chan	102	
10	Yong Cai	339	
11	Daniel Bosch	23	
12	Weixiong Fan	39	
13	Vincent Adolfse	25	
14	Jocelyn Cao	71	
15	Cheong Yi Lee	18	
16	Mohamed Aabidi	20	
17	Michael Chang	121	
Total		5,487	

== 25: Party for Sports ==
Candidate list for the Party for Sports
Position	Candidate	Votes	Result
1	Anne Marie van Duivenboden	2,470	
2	Armand van der Smissen	165	
3	Danny van Brussel	113	
4	Gert-Jan Liefers	237	
5	Wiel Ladeur	87	
6	Maurits Bijl	56	
7	Daniela Stols-Gonçalves	198	
8	Erik Alexander Kempenaar	41	
9	Esther Devilee	153	
10	Robert Maaskant	446	
Total		3,966	

== 26: Political Party for Basic Income ==
Candidate list for the Political Party for Basic Income
Position	Candidate	Votes	Result
1	Sepp Hanen	536	
2	Ludovic van Mierlo	47	
3	Susan Delsing	159	
4	Reginald Diepenhorst	15	
5	Eric Binsbergen	32	
6	Ron Smit	20	
7	Marc Veeger	13	
8	Edgar van der Staaij	18	
9	Raymond Karremann Hanen	25	
10	Dennis Rosenbaum	26	
11	Sijbren Sijtsma	147	
Total		1,038	

== See also ==
- List of members of the House of Representatives of the Netherlands, 2023–2025

== Sources ==
- Kiesraad (4 December 2023a). "Model P 22-1: Proces-verbaal van de uitslag van de verkiezing van de Tweede Kamer der Staten-Generaal" (PDF) (in Dutch).
