= Isa Kahraman =

Dutch politician (born 1974)

Member of the House of Representatives
- In office 6 December 2023 – 11 November 2025

Personal details
- Born: 1 April 1974 (age 52) Midyat, Turkey
- Party: New Social Contract (since 2023)
- Other political affiliations: Christian Democratic Appeal (formerly)
- Education: Saxion University of Applied Sciences; Nyenrode Business Universiteit

Isa Kahraman (born 1974) is a Turkish-born Dutch politician of New Social Contract (NSC) who served on the House of Representatives between December 2023 and November 2025. His portfolio included veterans, foreign religious minorities, defence, and development cooperation before the latter two were replaced by foreign policy and international culture policy following the swearing in of the Schoof cabinet.

== Early life ==
Kahraman was born on 1 April 1974 to Assyrian parents originally from Bardakçı, Midyat, and arrived in the Netherlands as a young child. He graduated from the Saxion University of Applied Sciences in 1998 with a degree in commercial economics and worked as a managing director at an international consulting firm. He also attended the Nyenrode Business University from 2005 to 2008 and graduated with an MS in Management.

== Political career ==
In 2006, Kahraman was elected to the Rijssen-Holten municipal council, where he would serve for three terms until 2018. Two years later, he became the party leader for the Christian Democratic Appeal. After departing from the council, he retired from politics until the early 2020s over concerns of social security.

In November 2023, Kahraman was elected to the Dutch Houth of Representatives, ranking 16th on the list of candidates for the New Social Contract. He departed for The Hague the next day to begin his position in parliament.

In March 2024, Kahraman filed a parliamentary motion to postpone talks with Bosnia and Herzegovina about a potential accession to the European Union (EU). The motion was defeated by a narrow margin, while Prime Minister Mark Rutte had indicated in advance that he would not veto the talks to avoid alienating the Netherlands within the EU.

In 2025, Kahraman commented on the arrest of Ekrem İmamoğlu, urging free and fair election, and called for a ceasefire between Israel and Hamas in the Gaza war. In the same year, Kahraman announced that we would not be seeking a second term to the House of Representatives. His term ended on 11 November 2025.

=== Minority rights advocacy ===
Kahraman has previously been an advocate for Assyrians and has publicly spoken out against their persecution. In late 2024, Kahraman met with a delegation from the Bethnahrin National Council and discussed regional developments. In the wake of the 2025 massacres of Syrian Alawites, Kahraman submitted a motion to the Dutch House of Representatives alongside Don Ceder of the Christian Union urging for the government to create feasible solutions to protect minority rights of Alawites, Christians, and Druze in Syria. He has expressed skepticism over the future of Christians in Syria and has called for greater action to be taken for their protection by Dutch politicians.

In September 2025, Kahraman submitted a motion to parliament to grant Assyrians and Armenians living in the Netherlands the right to change Turkish-imposed surnames based on a May 2024 law.

=== House Committee Assignments ===
- Committee for European Affairs
- Committee for Foreign Trade and Development
- Committee for Foreign Affairs
- Contact group United States
- Committee for Defence (chair)
- Committee for Asylum and Migration
- Delegation to the NATO Parliamentary Assembly

== Personal life ==
Kahraman is a member of the Syriac Orthodox Church. In June 2025, he became a godfather to a Belarusian political prisoner named Dzmitry Sluk. As of 2018, Kahraman was living with his wife and three daughters in Rijssen, Overijssel.

== Electoral history ==
Electoral history of Isa Kahraman
Year	Body	Party	Pos.	Votes	Result		Ref.
Year	Body	Party	Pos.	Votes	Party seats	Individual	Ref.
2023	House of Representatives	New Social Contract	16	3,357	20	Won	

== See also ==
- List of members of the House of Representatives of the Netherlands, 2023–2025
