= Valize =

Valize is a Dutch surname. It may refer to:

- Jan Valize (born 1982), Dutch politician
- Mitch Valize (born 1995), Dutch Para-cyclist

== See also ==
- Valise
