= Agnes Joseph =

Dutch politician (born 1980)

Member of the House of Representatives
- In office 6 December 2023 – 11 November 2025

Personal details
- Born: 15 April 1980 (age 46) Amsterdam, Netherlands
- Party: BBB (since 2025)
- Other party: NSC (2023–2025)

Agnes Scarlet Joseph (born 15 April 1980) is a Dutch politician from the New Social Contract who served on the House of Representatives between December 2023 and November 2025. Her focus was on pensions, financial markets, elderly and disabled care, and mental health.

She described Dutch pension reforms passed in the previous term as disastrous, and she called the transfer of existing pension fund assets to the new system an infringement on property rights. When NSC entered the governing coalition, no commitments were made about pension policy, but the coalition parties decided not to introduce any proposals before January 2025. That month, after the reforms had been enacted by the first pension funds, Joseph announced an amendment, co-sponsored by party leader Pieter Omtzigt and Henk Vermeer of the Farmer–Citizen Movement, that would require participants of pension funds to approve the move of existing assets to the new system through a referendum.

In July 2025, after the government had fallen and new elections had been announced, she announced that she had left NSC and would stay in parliament as a member of the farmers party BBB. Joseph was not re-elected in October 2025, and her term ended on 11 November.

== House committee assignments ==
- Committee for the Intelligence and Security Services
- Committee for Health, Welfare and Sport
- Committee for Climate Policy and Green Growth

== Electoral history ==
Electoral history of Agnes Joseph
Year	Body	Party	Pos.	Votes	Result		Ref.
Year	Body	Party	Pos.	Votes	Party seats	Individual	Ref.
2023	House of Representatives	New Social Contract	8	2,348	20	Won	
2025	House of Representatives	Farmer–Citizen Movement	8	2,401	4	Lost	

== See also ==
- List of members of the House of Representatives of the Netherlands, 2023–2025
