= Hartsuiker =

Hartsuiker is a surname. Notable people with the surname include:

- Erik Hartsuiker (1940–2019), Dutch rower
- Jeroen Hartsuiker (born 1984), Dutch politician
- Ton Hartsuiker (1933–2015), Dutch classical pianist and composer
