= Harm Holman =

Dutch politician (born 1957)

Member of the House of Representatives
- In office 6 December 2023 – 11 November 2025

Member of the Provincial Council of Drenthe
- In office 1994–2006

Personal details
- Born: 27 July 1957 (age 69) Roden, Netherlands
- Party: New Social Contract; Christian Democratic Appeal
- Occupation: Politician; dairy farmer

Harm Holman (born 27 July 1957) is a Dutch politician, who served on the House of Representatives between the November 2023 and October 2025 general elections. He was a member of the Christian Democratic Appeal (CDA) before switching to New Social Contract (NSC).

== Life and career ==
Holman was born in 1957 in Roden, Drenthe. He worked as a dairy farmer from 1979 to 2021, having succeeded his father in managing the family farm in Steenbergen, Drenthe. A member of the CDA, he held a seat in the Noordenveld Municipal Council, the Noorderzijlvest Water Board, and the Provincial Council of Drenthe (1994–2006).

Holman joined New Social Contract (NSC), when it was established by Pieter Omtzigt, formerly of the CDA, ahead of the November 2023 general election. He later characterized the CDA as a "traditional governing party", and he said that he was inspired by Omtzigt's efforts in uncovering the childcare benefits scandal. Holman was the party's 20th candidate in November 2023, and he was elected to the House of Representatives. His portfolio included agriculture, the Groningen gas field, mining, and competition before the latter two were replaced by nitrogen crisis and animal welfare following the Schoof cabinet's swearing in.

In an interview, Holman opined that the viability of the agricultural sector was under threat due to years of failing policy from the government, referring to the nitrogen and manure crises. He admitted his complicity as a politician for the CDA. In January 2025, Holman criticized agriculture minister Femke Wiersma (BBB), of his own governing coalition, for failing to articulate a future vision for the sector. He argued that the government should provide a clear plan to mitigate the environmental impact of agriculture, to avert an imminent involuntary reduction in the livestock population. Holman advocated for a transition from intensive to extensive farming, implying a voluntary reduction in the livestock population.

He did not run for re-election in 2025, and his term ended on 11 November 2025.

=== House committee assignments ===
- Committee for Asylum and Migration
- Committee for Agriculture, Fisheries, Food Security and Nature

== Electoral history ==
Electoral history of Harm Holman
Year	Body	Party	Pos.	Votes	Result		Ref.
Year	Body	Party	Pos.	Votes	Party seats	Individual	Ref.
2023	House of Representatives	New Social Contract	20	1,378	20	Won	

== See also ==
- List of members of the House of Representatives of the Netherlands, 2023–2025
