= Marina Vondeling =

Dutch politician (born 1986)

Member of the House of Representatives
- Incumbent
- Assumed office 6 December 2023

Personal details
- Born: Marina Vondeling; 6 December 1986 (age 39) Rotterdam, Netherlands
- Party: PVV
- Education: Erasmus University Rotterdam
- Occupation: Politician

Marina Vondeling (born 14 July 1986 in Rotterdam) is a Dutch politician from the Party for Freedom (PVV) and former lawyer. In the 2023 Dutch general election she was elected to the Dutch House of Representatives. She was the party's spokesperson for administrative law, the judiciary, preventive detention, private law, family law, and gambling until her portfolio changed to asylum, immigration, and terrorism.

Vondeling was born in Rotterdam in 1986. She graduated with a law degree at the Erasmus University Rotterdam before working as an advisor on immigration and asylum laws. She also worked as a policy advisor to the PVV's parliamentary group.

== House committee assignments ==
- Committee for Justice and Security
- Committee for Asylum and Migration
- Delegation to the Parliamentary Assembly of the Council of Europe

== Electoral history ==
Electoral history of Marina Vondeling
Year	Body	Party	Pos.	Votes	Result		Ref.
Year	Body	Party	Pos.	Votes	Party seats	Individual	Ref.
2023	House of Representatives	Party for Freedom	34	1,589	37	Won	
2025	House of Representatives	Party for Freedom	14	1,411	26	Won	

== See also ==
- List of members of the House of Representatives of the Netherlands, 2023–present
