= Jeremy Mooiman =

Dutch politician (born 1995)

Member of the House of Representatives
- Incumbent
- Assumed office 6 December 2023

Member of the Provincial Council of South Holland
- Incumbent
- Assumed office 2016

Personal details
- Born: 22 November 1995 (age 30) Zoetermeer, Netherlands
- Party: PVV
- Occupation: Politician

Jeremy Mooiman (born 22 November 1995 in Zoetermeer) is a Dutch politician from the Party for Freedom.

== Biography ==
Mooiman was born in Zoetermeer in 1995 and grew up in the Meerzicht district of the city. He completed studies in IT and worked for Atlassian as a developer.

He first stood for the PVV during the 2015 Dutch Provincial Council elections but was not elected. However, he was appointed to the South Holland Provincial council in 2016 to fill a vacant seat. In the 2023 Dutch general election, he was elected to the Dutch House of Representatives. He was the PVV's spokesperson for digital euro, the European Central Bank, and Eurobonds until his portfolio changed to housing and spatial planning.

=== House committee assignments ===
- Committee for Kingdom Relations
- Committee for Defence
- Committee for Housing and Spatial Planning

== Electoral history ==
Electoral history of Jeremy Mooiman
Year	Body	Party	Pos.	Votes	Result		Ref.
Year	Body	Party	Pos.	Votes	Party seats	Individual	Ref.
2023	House of Representatives	Party for Freedom	25	866	37	Won	
2025	House of Representatives	Party for Freedom	16	614	26	Won	

== See also ==
- List of members of the House of Representatives of the Netherlands, 2023–present
