= Eric Esser =

Dutch politician (born 1985)

Member of the House of Representatives
- In office 6 December 2023 – 11 November 2025

Personal details
- Party: Party for Freedom

Eric Esser (born 18 March 1985 in 's-Hertogenbosch) is a Dutch politician from the Party for Freedom (PVV).

Esser was a metalworker before entering politics. He was elected to the Dutch House of Representatives in the November 2023 general election, and he served as the PVV's spokesperson for social affairs and the labor market. One year into the House's term, Algemeen Dagblad noted that Esser was among the parliamentarians with the least debate contributions; Esser had talked for nine minutes in total, during three committee debates. He was not re-elected in October 2025, and his term ended on 11 November.

== House committee assignments ==
- Committee for Social Affairs and Employment
- Committee for Health, Welfare and Sport

== Electoral history ==
Electoral history of Eric Esser
Year	Body	Party	Pos.	Votes	Result		Ref.
Year	Body	Party	Pos.	Votes	Party seats	Individual	Ref.
2023	House of Representatives	Party for Freedom	29	1,313	37 / 150	Won	
2025	House of Representatives	Party for Freedom	44	474	26 / 150	Lost	
2026	's-Hertogenbosch Municipal Council	Party for Freedom	3	295	1 / 39	Lost	

== See also ==
- List of members of the House of Representatives of the Netherlands, 2023–2025
