= Mikal Tseggai =

Dutch politician (born 1995)

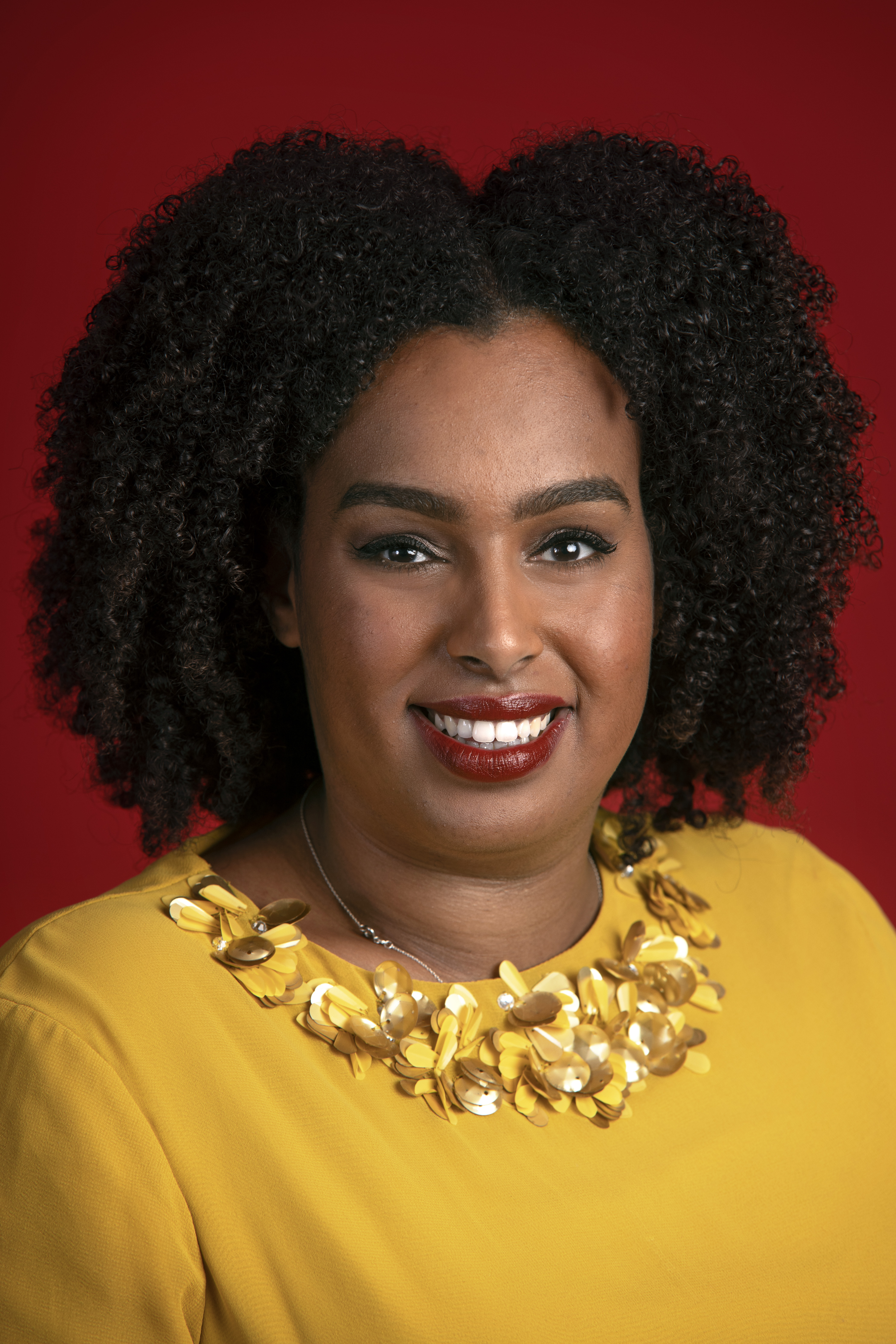
- Mikal Tseggai in 2021

Member of the House of Representatives
- Incumbent
- Assumed office 6 December 2023

Personal details
- Born: 2 February 1995 (age 31) Haarlem, Netherlands
- Party: Labour Party (until 2026); PRO (since 2026)
- Education: Utrecht University

Mikal Tseggai (born 2 February 1995) is a Dutch politician representing Progressief Nederland (PRO), and formerly the Labour Party (PvdA), who was first elected to the House of Representatives in the 2023 Dutch general election. Her focus has been on vocational education, media, gambling, sex work, human trafficking, and social integration.

She was born to parents who were refugees from Eritrea (then part of Ethiopia) who fled during the Eritrean War of Independence.

== House committee assignments ==
- Committee for Justice and Security
- Committee for Education, Culture and Science

== Electoral history ==
Electoral history of Mikal Tseggai
Year	Body	Party	Pos.	Votes	Result		Ref.
Year	Body	Party	Pos.	Votes	Party seats	Individual	Ref.
2021	House of Representatives	Labour Party	17	4,841	9	Lost	
2023	House of Representatives	GroenLinks–PvdA	20	7,035	25	Won	
2025	House of Representatives	GroenLinks–PvdA	25	18,635	20	Won (Note: Tseggai received enough preference votes to be elected despite her party's result.)	

== See also ==
- List of members of the House of Representatives of the Netherlands, 2023–present
