= Merlien Welzijn =

Dutch politician (born 1973)

Member of the House of Representatives
- In office 6 December 2023 – 11 November 2025

Personal details
- Born: 20 December 1973 (age 52) Paramaribo, Suriname
- Party: New Social Contract

Merlien Welzijn (born 20 December 1973) is a Suriname-born Dutch politician of the New Social Contract (NSC) who was a member of the House of Representatives between December 2023 and November 2025.

== Biography ==
Welzijn is of Surinamese descent. She has an older brother and two younger sisters. When Welzijn was around seven, her parents separated, and her father took care of the children. They were homeless for a year, staying at family and friends. Welzijn cited the experience as her reason to become politically active. Before her election, she served as board member of a housing corporation.

She ran for the House of Representatives in November 2023 as NSC's tenth candidate, and she was elected. Her portfolio contained housing, poverty, participation, and child care. Welzijn advocated for addressing a student housing shortage by encouraging homeowners to rent out rooms. She suggested increasing the allowed lodgings per house from one to two and relaxing rent protection regulations to permit eviction when a house is sold. During budget debates, she proposed to identify and bundle delayed housing projects such that they could be expedited, in a similar fashion to the Crisis and Recovery Act for infrastructure projects. She encouraged housing minister Mona Keijzer to negotiate mainly with housing corporations instead of private investors to ensure the affordability of new homes. Welzijn was not re-elected in October 2025, as NSC lost all its seats, and her term ended on 11 November.

=== House committee assignments ===
- Committee for Social Affairs and Employment
- Committee for Housing and Spatial Planning
- Committee for Climate Policy and Green Growth
- Delegation to the Interparliamentary Committee on the Dutch Language Union

== Electoral history ==
Electoral history of Merlien Welzijn
Year	Body	Party	Pos.	Votes	Result		Ref.
Year	Body	Party	Pos.	Votes	Party seats	Individual	Ref.
2023	House of Representatives	New Social Contract	10	3,496	20	Won	
2025	House of Representatives	New Social Contract	3	2,067	0	Lost	

== See also ==
- List of members of the House of Representatives of the Netherlands, 2023–2025
