= Annemarie Heite =

Dutch politician (born 1970)

Member of the House of Representatives
- In office 4 July 2024 – 11 November 2025
- Preceded by: Caspar Veldkamp

Personal details
- Born: 1 November 1970 (age 55) Meppel, Netherlands
- Party: New Social Contract
- Occupation: Politician

Annemarie Heite (born 1 November 1970) is a Dutch politician for the New Social Contract, who was a member of the House of Representatives between July 2024 and November 2025. She succeeded Caspar Veldkamp, who had been appointed foreign affairs minister in the Schoof cabinet two days earlier, and her portfolio includes defense materiel and personnel, emancipation, higher education, and science.

She was a manager at the National Coordinator Groningen (NCG).

== House committee assignments ==
- Committee for Education, Culture and Science
- Committee for Defence
- Committee for Housing and Spatial Planning

== Electoral history ==
Electoral history of Annemarie Heite
Year	Body	Party	Pos.	Votes	Result		Ref.
Year	Body	Party	Pos.	Votes	Party seats	Individual	Ref.
2023	House of Representatives	New Social Contract	22	6,457	20	Lost (Note: Heite was appointed to the body later during the term due to a vacancy.)	

== See also ==
- List of members of the House of Representatives of the Netherlands, 2023–2025
