= Geert Gabriëls =

Dutch politician (born 1979)

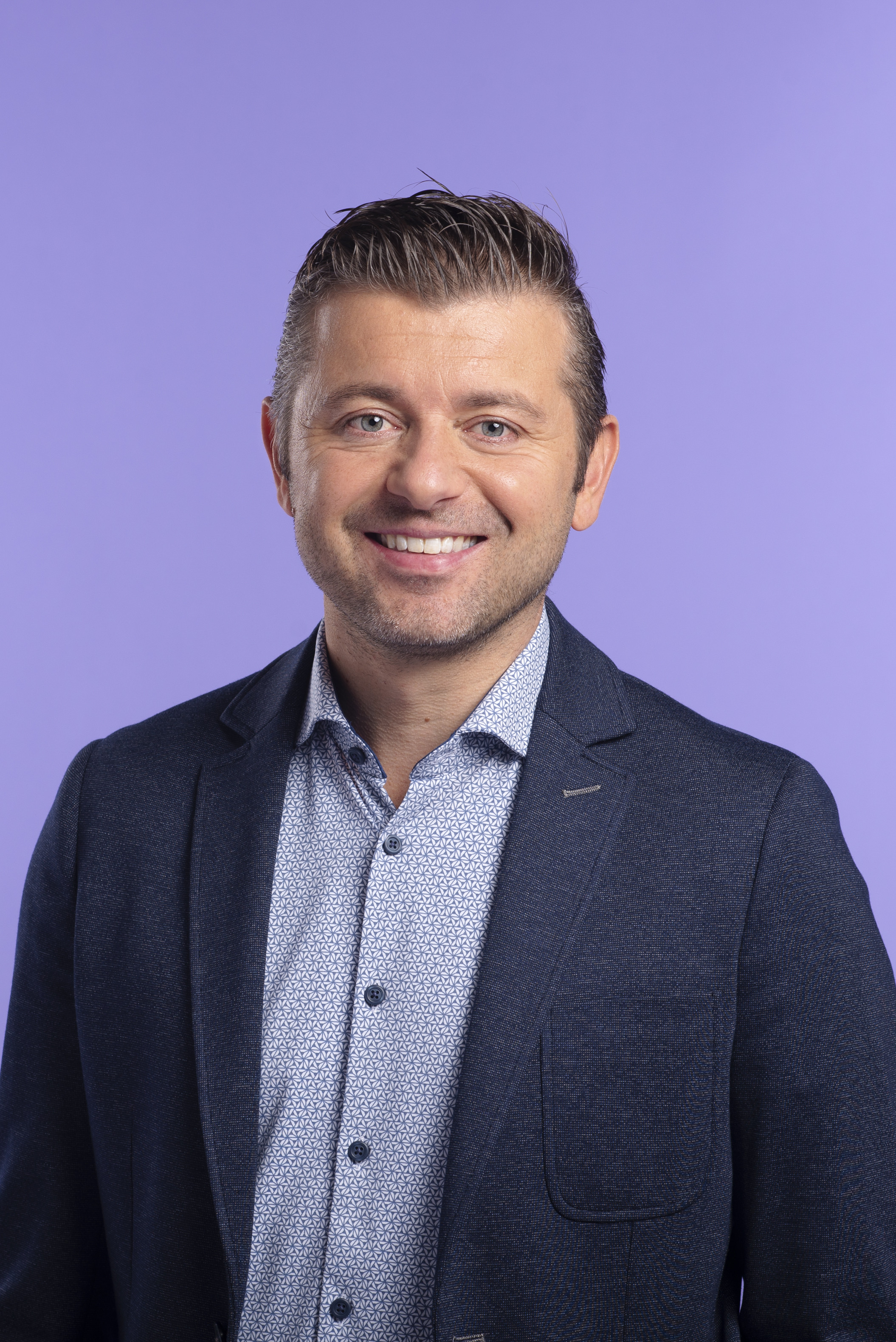
- Gabriëls in 2023

Member of the House of Representatives
- In office 6 December 2023 – 11 November 2025

Personal details
- Born: 30 October 1979 (age 46) Weert, Netherlands
- Party: GroenLinks
- Education: Utrecht University

Geert Gabriëls (born 30 October 1979) is a Dutch politician representing the GroenLinks who was a member of the House of Representatives between December 2023 and November 2025. His focus was on the environment, water management, spatial planning, and sustainable construction.

== House committee assignments ==
- Committee for Agriculture, Fisheries, Food Security and Nature
- Committee for Infrastructure and Water Management
- Committee for Housing and Spatial Planning
- Delegation to the OSCE Parliamentary Assembly

== Electoral history ==
Electoral history of Geert Gabriëls
Year	Body	Party	Pos.	Votes	Result		Ref.
Year	Body	Party	Pos.	Votes	Party seats	Individual	Ref.
2021	House of Representatives	GroenLinks	15	3,454	8	Lost	
2023	House of Representatives	GroenLinks–PvdA	15	8,034	25	Won	
2025	House of Representatives	GroenLinks–PvdA	19	5,239	20	Lost (Note: Gabriëls was not elected despite his party's result due to other candidates meeting the threshold for preference votes.)	

== See also ==
- List of members of the House of Representatives of the Netherlands, 2023–2025
