= Jimme Nordkamp =

Dutch politician (born 1996)

Member of the House of Representatives
- In office 9 December 2023 – 11 November 2025

Alderman of Losser
- In office 2022–2023

Municipal Council of Losser
- In office 2018–2022

Personal details
- Born: 22 September 1996 (age 30) Oldenzaal, Netherlands
- Party: Labour
- Education: Saxion University of Applied Sciences
- Occupation: Politician; union leader

Jimme Nordkamp (born 22 September 1996) is a Dutch politician of the Labour Party (PvdA).

== Early life and education ==
Nordkamp was born in 1996 in Oldenzaal, Overijssel, and he grew up in the village of Overdinkel. His father worked as a plasterer and gardener. Nordkamp studied business administration at the Saxion University of Applied Sciences in Enschede between 2016 and 2021, and he was a board member of the FNV Jong trade union between 2019 and 2021.

== Politics ==
He voted for the right-wing populist Party for Freedom (PVV) in the 2017 general election. In an interview, he mentioned the party was popular in his village, and he said the Labour Party's loss triggered him to look into social democracy. He switched to that party, believing rural decline would be better addressed by its policies. Nordkamp served on the Municipal Council of Losser as the Labour Party's parliamentary leader from 2018 until 2022, when he became an alderman responsible for housing and refugees. He has simultaneously been serving on the Labour Party's national board since 2020. He was elected to the House of Representatives in the 2023 Dutch general election, and he served as his party's spokesperson for defense. He was not re-elected in October 2025, and his term ended on 11 November.

=== House committee assignments ===
- Contact group Germany (chair)
- Committee for Infrastructure and Water Management (vice chair)
- Committee for European Affairs
- Committee for Foreign Trade and Development
- Committee for Foreign Affairs
- Committee for Defence

== Personal life ==
Nordkamp is a fan of the Dutch pirate music genre, and he helped get the tradition on the national register for intangible cultural heritage.

== Electoral history ==
Electoral history of Jimme Nordkamp
Year	Body	Party	Pos.	Votes	Result		Ref.
Year	Body	Party	Pos.	Votes	Party seats	Individual	Ref.
2023	House of Representatives	GroenLinks–PvdA	24	3,051	25	Won	
2025	House of Representatives	GroenLinks–PvdA	20	2,888	20	Lost (Note: Nordkamp was not elected despite his party's result due to other candidates meeting the threshold for preference votes.)	

== See also ==
- List of members of the House of Representatives of the Netherlands, 2023–2025
