= Martine van der Velde =

Dutch politician (born 1989)

Member of the House of Representatives
- In office 6 December 2023 – 11 November 2025

Member of the Provincial Council of Utrecht
- Incumbent
- Assumed office 29 March 2023

Personal details
- Born: 20 May 1989 (age 37) Groningen, Netherlands
- Party: PVV
- Occupation: Marketeer; Politician

Martine van der Velde (born 20 May 1989 in Groningen) is a Dutch politician from the Party for Freedom. Between December 2023 and November 2025, she was a member of the Dutch House of Representatives.

== Life ==
Van der Velde was born in Groningen in 1989. She worked in business marketing before entering politics as an employee for the PVV faction in Utrecht city council. She became a member of the Provincial Council of Utrecht in March 2023 as part of the PVV before being elected to the House of Representatives during the 2023 Dutch general election. In the House, she served as the party's spokesperson for culture, emancipation, and media. She did not run for re-election in 2025, and her term ended on 11 November 2025.

=== House committee assignments ===
- Committee for Education, Culture and Science
- Committee for Digital Affairs
- Committee for Agriculture, Fisheries, Food Security and Nature

== Electoral history ==
Electoral history of Martine van der Velde
| Year | Body | Party | Pos. | Votes | Result | | Ref. |
| Year | Body | Party | Pos. | Votes | Party seats | Individual | Ref. |
|---|---|---|---|---|---|---|---|
| 2023 | House of Representatives | Party for Freedom | 20 | 2,498 | 37 | Won | |

== See also ==
- List of members of the House of Representatives of the Netherlands, 2023–2025
