= Wim Meulenkamp =

Dutch politician (born 1973)

Member of the House of Representatives
- In office 6 December 2023 – 11 November 2025

Personal details
- Born: 3 January 1973 (age 53) Hengelo, Netherlands
- Party: VVD

Wim Meulenkamp (born 3 January 1973) is a Dutch politician from the People's Party for Freedom and Democracy who was elected to the Dutch Parliament in the 2023 Dutch general election.

In the House of Representatives, he was the VVD's spokesperson on spatial planning, horticulture, and fisheries. He was not re-elected in October 2025, and his term ended on 11 November.

== House committee assignments ==
- Committee for the Interior
- Committee for Agriculture, Fisheries, Food Security and Nature

== Electoral history ==
Electoral history of Wim Meulenkamp
| Year | Body | Party | Pos. | Votes | Result | | Ref. |
| Year | Body | Party | Pos. | Votes | Party seats | Individual | Ref. |
|---|---|---|---|---|---|---|---|
| 2023 | House of Representatives | People's Party for Freedom and Democracy | 21 | 2,528 | 24 | Won | |
| 2025 | House of Representatives | People's Party for Freedom and Democracy | 25 | 3,301 | 22 | Lost | |

== See also ==
- List of members of the House of Representatives of the Netherlands, 2023–2025
