= Glimina Chakor =

Dutch politician (born 1976)

Glimina Chakor (born 26 March 1976 in Hoogezand-Sappemeer) is a Dutch politician from GroenLinks. In the 2023 Dutch general election, she was elected to the Dutch House of Representatives for the GroenLinks–PvdA alliance. Her specialties were the interior and the Wadden Sea. She was not re-elected in October 2025, and her term ended on 11 November.

Chakor previously served as a municipal councillor in Groningen.

== House committees ==
- Committee for the Interior
- Committee for Kingdom Relations
- Committee for Digital Affairs
- Committee for Infrastructure and Water Management
- Delegation to the Benelux Parliament

== Electoral history ==
Electoral history of Glimina Chakor
Year	Body	Party	Pos.	Votes	Result		Ref.
Year	Body	Party	Pos.	Votes	Party seats	Individual	Ref.
2021	House of Representatives	GroenLinks	48	654	8	Lost	
2023	House of Representatives	GroenLinks–PvdA	23	17,794	25	Won	
2025	House of Representatives	GroenLinks–PvdA	35	5,632	20	Lost	

== See also ==
- List of members of the House of Representatives of the Netherlands, 2023–2025
