= Claire Martens =

Dutch politician (born 1987)

Member of the House of Representatives
- Incumbent
- Assumed office 6 December 2023

Personal details
- Born: 19 September 1987 (age 38) Maarssen, Netherlands
- Party: VVD

Claire Martens-America (born 19 September 1987) is a Dutch politician from the People's Party for Freedom and Democracy who was elected to the Dutch Parliament in the 2023 Dutch general election. Martens was a member of Amsterdam city council.

In the House, her portfolio includes macroeconomic policy, industrial policy, innovation, higher education, and media. During a debate about the government's education budget in February 2024, Martens successfully added an amendment to the Tertiary Education and Research Act, allowing institutions of higher education to limit foreign students, to the budget bill. The amendment achieved its goal by enabling them to declare an admission stop for the English track of a study program. She presented a plan in 2024 to reform the Dutch public broadcasting system, for which the Schoof cabinet had planned budget cuts. She proposed that its member-based broadcast associations would be replaced by several "media houses", representing different ideologies. Management and support functions would be consolidated under a single umbrella organization.

== House committee assignments ==
- Committee for Kingdom Relations
- Committee for Education, Culture and Science
- Committee for Economic Affairs
- Committee for Digital Affairs
- Committee for Finance
- Committee for Defence
- Committee for Climate Policy and Green Growth

== Electoral history ==
Electoral history of Claire Martens
| Year | Body | Party | Pos. | Votes | Result | | Ref. |
| Year | Body | Party | Pos. | Votes | Party seats | Individual | Ref. |
|---|---|---|---|---|---|---|---|
| 2023 | House of Representatives | People's Party for Freedom and Democracy | 20 | 1,548 | 24 / 150 | Won | |
| 2025 | House of Representatives | People's Party for Freedom and Democracy | 9 | 6,552 | 22 / 150 | Won | |
| 2026 | De Bilt Municipal Council | People's Party for Freedom and Democracy | 23 (Note: Martens participated as a lijstduwer.) | 55 | 5 / 27 | Lost | |

== See also ==
- List of members of the House of Representatives of the Netherlands, 2023–present
