= Rosemarijn Dral =

Dutch politician

Member of the House of Representatives
- In office 4 July 2024 – 11 November 2025
- Preceded by: Mariëlle Paul

Personal details
- Born: 3 January 1985 (age 41) Oostzaan, Netherlands
- Party: People's Party for Freedom and Democracy
- Occupation: Politician

Rosemarijn M. Dral (born 3 January 1985) is a Dutch politician for the People's Party for Freedom and Democracy (VVD), who was a member of the House of Representatives between July 2024 and November 2025. She succeeded Mariëlle Paul, who had been appointed education state secretary in the Schoof cabinet. Dral was the VVD's spokesperson on human trafficking, prostitution, gambling, juvenile delinquency, administrative law, copyright law, and privacy.

== House committee assignments ==
- Committee for Justice and Security
- Committee for Asylum and Migration

== Electoral history ==
Electoral history of Rosemarijn Dral
Year	Body	Party	Pos.	Votes	Result		Ref.
Year	Body	Party	Pos.	Votes	Party seats	Individual	Ref.
2017	House of Representatives	People's Party for Freedom and Democracy	56	924	33	Lost	
2023	House of Representatives	People's Party for Freedom and Democracy	29	2,990	24	Lost (Note: Dral was appointed to the body later during the term due to a vacancy.)	

== See also ==
- List of members of the House of Representatives of the Netherlands, 2023–2025
