= Henk Vermeer =

Dutch politician (born 1966)

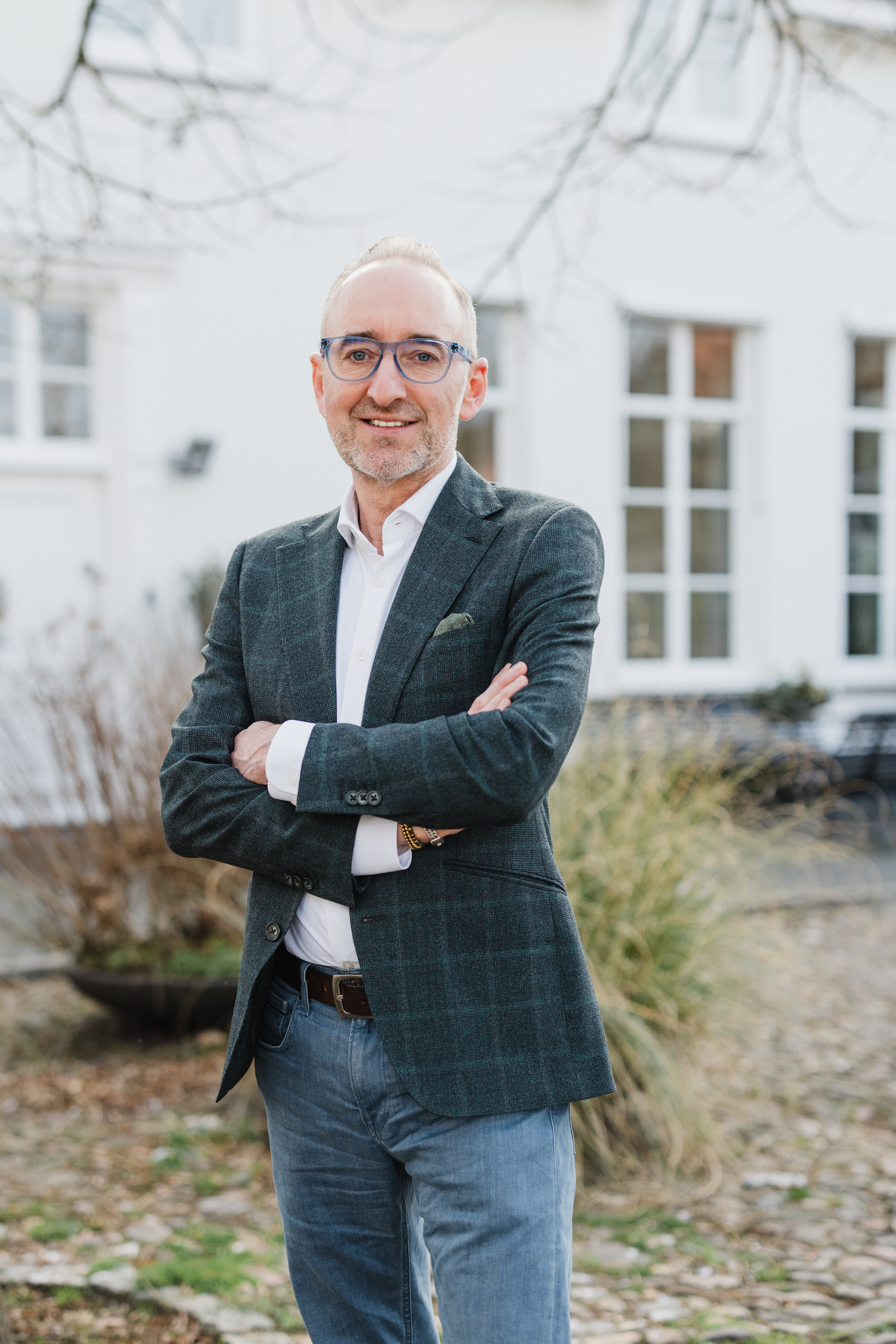
- Vermeer (2026)

Member of the House of Representatives
- Incumbent
- Assumed office 6 December 2023

Leader of the Farmer–Citizen Movement
- Incumbent
- Assumed office 20 February 2026
- Preceded by: Caroline van der Plas

Personal details
- Born: 21 August 1966 (age 59) Uddel, Netherlands
- Party: Farmer–Citizen Movement (2019–present)
- Other political affiliations: Harderwijk Anders (2017–2023)
- Children: 2 children, 3 stepchildren

Henk Vermeer (born 21 August 1966) is a Dutch politician of the Farmer–Citizen Movement (BBB).

== Early life and career ==
Vermeer was born on 21 August 1966, in Uddel, and he has five younger siblings.

From 2018 to 2023, he was municipal councillor and parliamentary leader in Harderwijk on behalf of the local Harderwijk Anders party. His job was as director for an advertising agency. He founded the Farmer–Citizen Movement (BBB) in 2019 together with Caroline van der Plas and Wim Groot Koerkamp. Vermeer served as the party's campaign leader and secretary, and Van der Plas called him her "work husband". He was placed fourth on the party list in the November 2023 general election, and he was elected to the House of Representatives. He is the BBB's spokesperson for economic affairs, finances, climate, foreign affairs, European affairs, and the interior. As part of the 2023–2024 cabinet formation, Vermeer assisted Van der Plas in negotiations.

In early 2025, he co-filed an amendment with Agnes Joseph and Pieter Omtzigt of New Social Contract that would require participants of pension funds to approve the transfer of assets to a new system. The reforms were passed in the previous term, and the first pension funds had moved to the new system.

During the October 2025 Dutch general elections, Vermeer served the party again as the party's campaign leader. He was placed third on the party list.The party lost 3 of the seven seats in parliament.

In February 2026, he succeeded Caroline van der Plas as leader of the Farmer–Citizen Movement.

=== House committees ===
Vermeer is on the following parliamentary committees:

- Presidium (Fifth Deputy Speaker)
- Committee for Kingdom Relations
- Committee for Economic Affairs
- Committee for Digital Affairs
- Public Expenditure committee
- Committee for Finance
- Committee for Foreign Affairs
- Committee for Climate Policy and Green Growth
- Delegation to the Benelux Parliament

== Personal life ==
Vermeer is married to Tineke, and he has suffered from a chronic lung infection since around 2010. He officiates as a football referee as a hobby.

== Electoral history ==
Electoral history of Henk Vermeer
Year	Body	Party	Pos.	Votes	Result		Ref.
Year	Body	Party	Pos.	Votes	Party seats	Individual	Ref.
2023	House of Representatives	Farmer–Citizen Movement	4	2,526	7	Won	
2025	House of Representatives	Farmer–Citizen Movement	3	3,469	4	Won	
