= Jan Valize =

Dutch politician (born 1982)

Member of the House of Representatives
- In office 6 December 2023 – 11 November 2025

Personal details
- Born: 14 September 1982 (age 43) Venlo, Netherlands
- Party: Party for Freedom

Jan Valize (born 14 September 1982) is a Dutch politician. A member of the Party for Freedom (PVV), he was a member of the House of Representatives between December 2023 and November 2025. As a parliamentarian, he focused on digital affairs. Valize previously served as a municipal councillor of Venlo for one term from 2018 to 2022.

== House committee assignments ==
- Petitions committee (vice chair)
- Committee for Climate Policy and Green Growth (vice chair)
- Committee for Education, Culture and Science
- Committee for Digital Affairs
- Public Expenditure committee

== Electoral history ==
Electoral history of Jan Valize
Year	Body	Party	Pos.	Votes	Result		Ref.
Year	Body	Party	Pos.	Votes	Party seats	Individual	Ref.
2023	House of Representatives	Party for Freedom	35	594	37	Won	
2025	House of Representatives	Party for Freedom	39	600	26	Lost	

== See also ==
- List of members of the House of Representatives of the Netherlands, 2023–2025
