= Caroline van der Plas =

Dutch politician and journalist (born 1967)

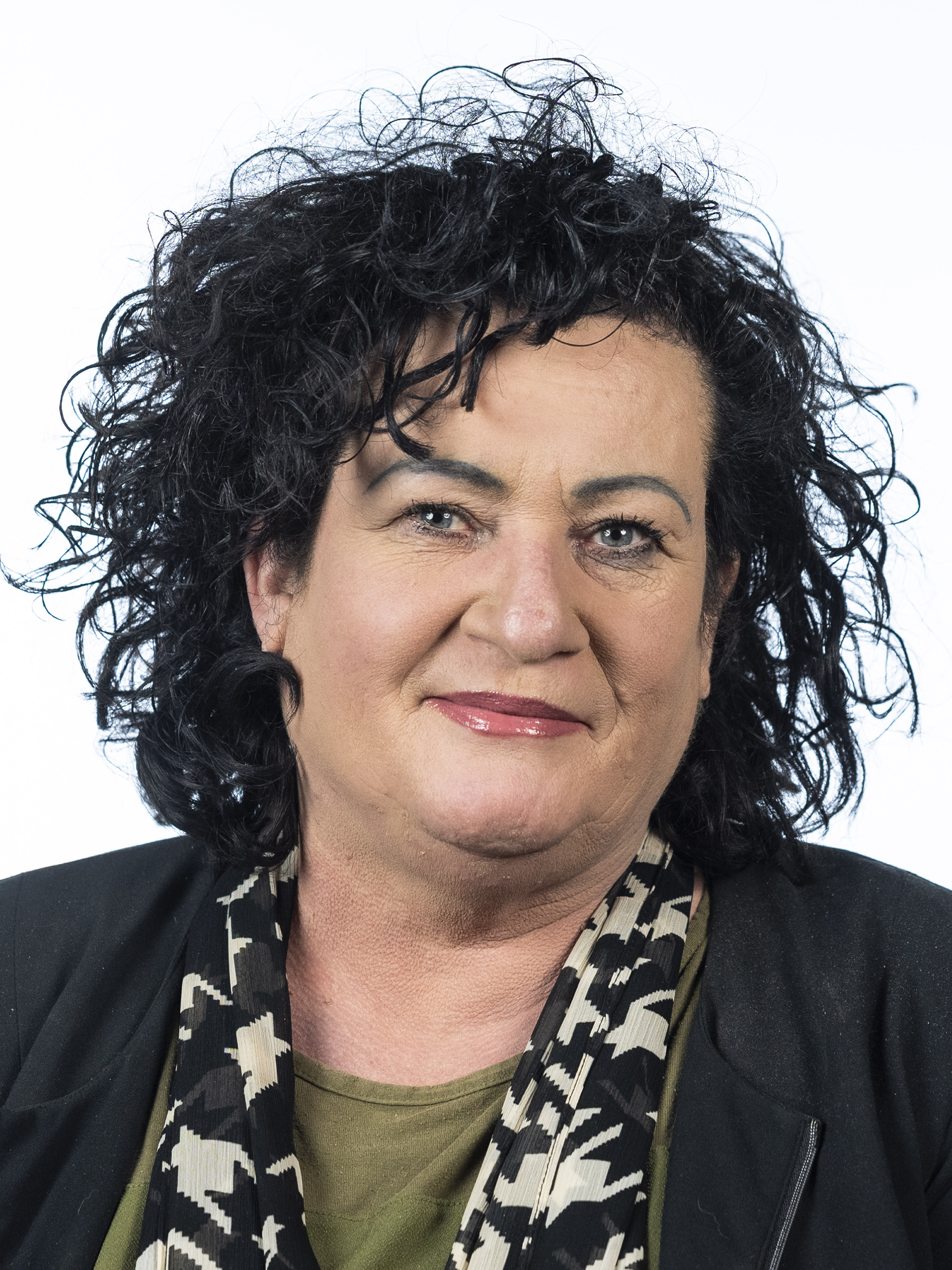
- Official portrait, 2021

Leader of the Farmer–Citizen Movement
- In office 17 October 2020 – 20 February 2026
- Preceded by: Position established
- Succeeded by: Henk Vermeer

Leader of the Farmer–Citizen Movement in the House of Representatives
- Incumbent
- Assumed office 31 March 2021
- Preceded by: Position established

Member of the House of Representatives
- Incumbent
- Assumed office 31 March 2021

Personal details
- Born: Caroline Ann Maria van der Plas; 6 June 1967 (age 59) Cuijk, Netherlands
- Party: BBB (since 2019)
- Other political affiliations: CDA (before 2019)
- Spouse: Jan Gruben (died 2019)
- Children: 2

Caroline Ann Maria van der Plas (pronounced [ˈkɛrəlɑiɱ vɑn dər ˈplɑs]; born 6 June 1967) is a Dutch journalist and politician who has served as a member of the House of Representatives since 2021. A former member of the Christian Democratic Appeal (CDA), which she left in 2019, she is the founder of the Farmer–Citizen Movement (BBB).

== Early life and career ==
Van der Plas was born on 6 June 1967 in Cuijk to a Dutch father and an Irish mother. Her father, Wil van der Plas (1937–2014), was a sports journalist and worked for the regional newspaper Deventer Dagblad. Her mother, Nuala Fitzpatrick, is a retired politician of the Christian Democratic Appeal (CDA), who served as an alderman in the municipal executive of Deventer.

Van der Plas began her career as a journalist, covering the meat industry for Reed Business. She would later shift to communications, providing support to agricultural workers' associations and the Dutch Association of Pig Farmers.

== Political career ==
Originally a member of the CDA, Van der Plas left the party shortly after the 2019 provincial elections. During her membership, she had frequently criticised the party for not doing enough to represent the interests of the agricultural sector. In response to the widespread farmers' protests that took place in the Netherlands in October 2019, she then founded the Farmer–Citizen Movement (BBB).

On 17 October 2020, Van der Plas was unanimously chosen as the party leader of the BBB. Her campaign for the 2021 general election focused on issues important to rural and agrarian voters, including pledges for a "Ministry of the Countryside" located at least 100 kilometres from The Hague, and a removal of the ban on neonicotinoids. The party won one seat in the House of Representatives, and Van der Plas was installed on 31 March 2021. She continued to serve as the BBB's parliamentary leader after the November 2023 general election as well as spokesperson for agriculture, nature, health, and infrastructure. The latter two specialties were replaced by foreign trade and development aid following the swearing in of the Schoof cabinet.

On 20 February 2026 Van der Plas handed over leadership of the party to fellow party founder Henk Vermeer, she remained a member of the House of Representatives.

== Personal life ==
Van der Plas lives in Deventer and has two sons. Her husband, Jan Gruben, died in 2019 of pancreatic cancer.

She was raised a Roman Catholic, but is now irreligious.

== Electoral history ==
Electoral history of Caroline van der Plas
| Year | Body | Party | Pos. | Votes | Result | | Ref. |
| Year | Body | Party | Pos. | Votes | Party seats | Individual | Ref. |
|---|---|---|---|---|---|---|---|
| 2021 | House of Representatives | Farmer–Citizen Movement | 1 | 56,205 | 1 | Won | |
| 2023 | House of Representatives | Farmer–Citizen Movement | 1 | 387,494 | 7 | Won | |
| 2025 | House of Representatives | Farmer–Citizen Movement | 1 | 122,624 | 4 | Won | |
