= Ouafa Oualhadj =

Dutch politician (born 1990)

- Oualhadj in 2026

Member of the House of Representatives
- Incumbent
- Assumed office 12 November 2025

Personal details
- Born: 26 February 1990 (age 36)
- Party: Democrats 66

Ouafa Oualhadj (born 26 February 1990) is a Dutch politician who was elected member of the House of Representatives in 2025. From 2016 to 2025, she worked at the Ministry of Finance.
