= Vincent van den Born =

Dutch politician (born 1967)

Member of the House of Representatives
- In office 6 December 2023 – 11 November 2025

Municipal councillor of Den Helder
- Incumbent
- Assumed office 29 March 2018

Personal details
- Born: Vincent H. van den Born; 1 February 1967 (age 59) Amsterdam, Netherlands
- Party: PVV
- Occupation: Politician

Vincent H. van den Born (born 1 February 1967) is a Dutch politician representing the Party for Freedom (PVV).

== Career ==
Before entering politics, Van den Born was a security guard and then a BOA (investigation officer) for the Dutch National Police before working at the court in Alkmaar. He has also been a municipal councillor of Den Helder since 2018 for the PVV where he is party leader.

On 6 December 2023, Van den Born became a member of the House of Representatives. He was his party's spokesperson for pensions until his portfolio was removed. Instead, he served as the party's liaison, and he explained his responsibilities as "doing internal activities within the parliamentary group and nationally". One year into the House's new term, Algemeen Dagblad noted that Van den Born had not made any contributions in plenary or committee debates. He did not run for re-election in 2025, and his term ended on 11 November 2025.

=== House committees ===
- Committee for Education, Culture and Science
- Committee for Digital Affairs

== Electoral history ==
Electoral history of Vincent van den Born
Year	Body	Party	Pos.	Votes	Result		Ref.
Year	Body	Party	Pos.	Votes	Party seats	Individual	Ref.
2021	House of Representatives	Party for Freedom	41	176	17	Lost	
2023	House of Representatives	Party for Freedom	31	386	37	Won	
