= Bram Kouwenhoven =

Dutch politician (born 1989)

Member of the House of Representatives
- In office 14 May 2025 – 11 November 2025
- Preceded by: Pieter Omtzigt

Personal details
- Born: 27 February 1989 (age 37) Gouda, Netherlands
- Party: New Social Contract
- Education: Erasmus University Rotterdam

A. J. "Bram" Kouwenhoven (born 27 February 1989) is a Dutch politician who served as a member of the House of Representatives between May and November 2025. A member of New Social Contract (NSC), he succeeded former party leader Pieter Omtzigt, who had resigned for health reasons. Prior to his service in the House of Representatives, Kouwenhoven was a civil servant for social affairs of The Hague.
