= Martin de Beer =

Dutch politician (born 1980)

Member of the House of Representatives
- In office 25 June 2025 – 11 November 2025
- Preceded by: Judith Tielen

Personal details
- Born: 8 February 1980 (age 46)
- Party: People's Party for Freedom and Democracy

Martin de Beer (born 8 February 1980) is a Dutch politician who served as a member of the House of Representatives between June and November 2025. From 2014 to 2025, he served as alderman of Heerlen. From 2012 to 2015, he was a member of the Provincial Council of Limburg.
