= Don Ceder =

Dutch lawyer and politician (born 1989)

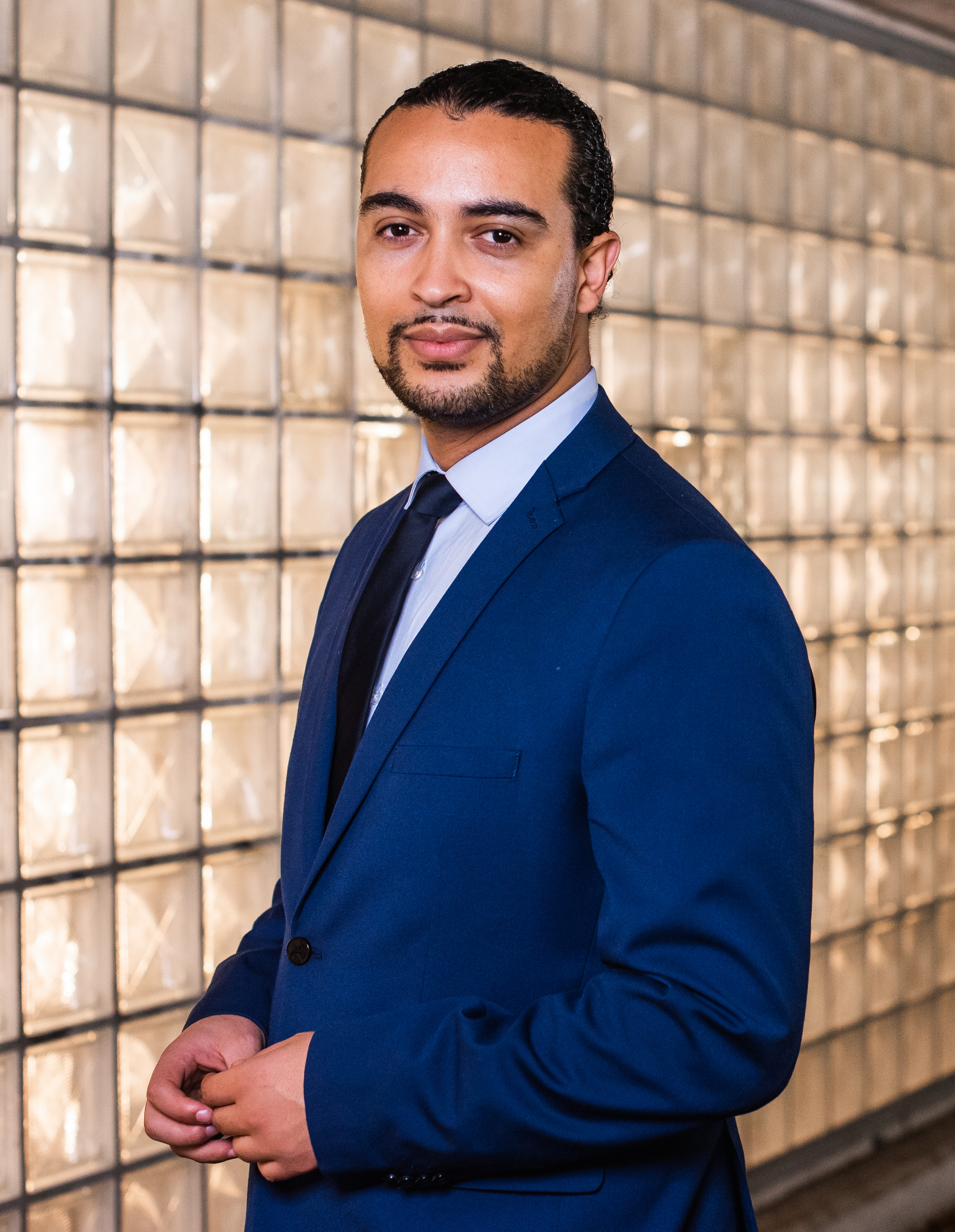
- Ceder in 2020

Member of the House of Representatives
- Incumbent
- Assumed office 31 March 2021

Member of the Amsterdam municipal council
- In office 29 March 2018 – 31 March 2021
- Succeeded by: Tjitske Kuiper

Duo-commissielid of the States of North Holland
- In office 26 May 2015 – 12 September 2018
- Succeeded by: Marijke Terlouw

Personal details
- Born: Don Guno Maria Ceder; 20 October 1989 (age 36) Amsterdam, Netherlands
- Party: Christian Union
- Education: Vrije Universiteit Amsterdam
- Occupation: Lawyer
- Website: donceder.nl

Don Guno Maria Ceder (born 20 October 1989) is a Dutch lawyer and politician, serving as a member of House of Representatives since the 2021 general election.

After studying law at the Vrije Universiteit Amsterdam, he founded a company with his cousin, but left in 2015 to start his own law practice. He won a seat in the Amsterdam municipal council three years later as a member of the political party Christian Union.

== Early life and education ==
Ceder was born on 20 October 1989 in the Dutch capital Amsterdam to a Surinamese father and a Ghanaian mother. He has a brother, a half-brother, and a half-sister, and he grew up in the Zuidoost neighborhood Bijlmermeer. Ceder's parents split up when he was in elementary school, and he was subsequently raised by his mother. He attended the secondary school Sint-Nicolaaslyceum at gymnasium level. He studied law at the Vrije Universiteit Amsterdam starting at age seventeen and earned his Master of Laws degree in 2013. While studying, he had an internship at the Christian Union for nine months. Before, he had been a member of the Labour Party for a short period.

== Legal career ==
In January 2014, Ceder and his cousin Calvin Ceder founded a company providing legal advice to people targeted by debt collectors called Anti-Incasso. Besides, he worked as spokesperson for Stichting ConTel, a consumer organization helping telecom users.

Ceder left Anti-Incasso to start his own solo law practice in March 2015 called Ceder Advocatuur, that is focussed on defending people in debt. He had been admitted to the bar the month before. In 2018, business magazine Forbes placed him on their European 30 Under 30 in Law & Policy list. The following year, he successfully helped a woman get her aborted child registered in the Dutch civil registry shortly after a law was passed that makes this possible after a miscarriage. The woman, who later came to regret the abortion, told her story in an episode of the EO television program NieuwLicht. Ceder started taking on less cases in 2019 because of his position as municipal councilor. He represented over 15 parents who were caught up in the childcare benefits scandal.

Next to his job as lawyer and politician, Ceder is a reservist in the Royal Dutch Army, where he is a second lieutenant.

== Politics ==
=== Local and regional ===
Ceder first ran for political office in the 2014 municipal election. He was in third place on the Christian Union's party list in Amsterdam, but his party did not win any seats in the municipal council. In the 2015 provincial elections, Ceder was placed second on the shared list of the Christian Union and the Reformed Political Party in North Holland. He was not elected, as his party won one seat, but he was appointed duo-commissielid, meaning that he could not vote but could participate in committee meetings.

Ceder ran again for Amsterdam municipal councilor in the March 2018 election, this time being the party's lijsttrekker. The Christian Union won a single seat, marking the first time the party had been part of the Amsterdam council. He was sworn in on 29 March and was the youngest member of the council. Due to his workload as councilman, Ceder left the States of North Holland a few months later. In 2019, he was on the lists for the provincial election (place 9) and the European Parliament election (place 29), but he was not elected. In the municipal council, Ceder has advocated providing more public services to undocumented minors and bringing an end to deportations of children who have been living in the Netherlands for over five years. He has also proposed ending window prostitution in the city and creating a homeless shelter that is opened 24 hours a day.

=== House of Representatives ===
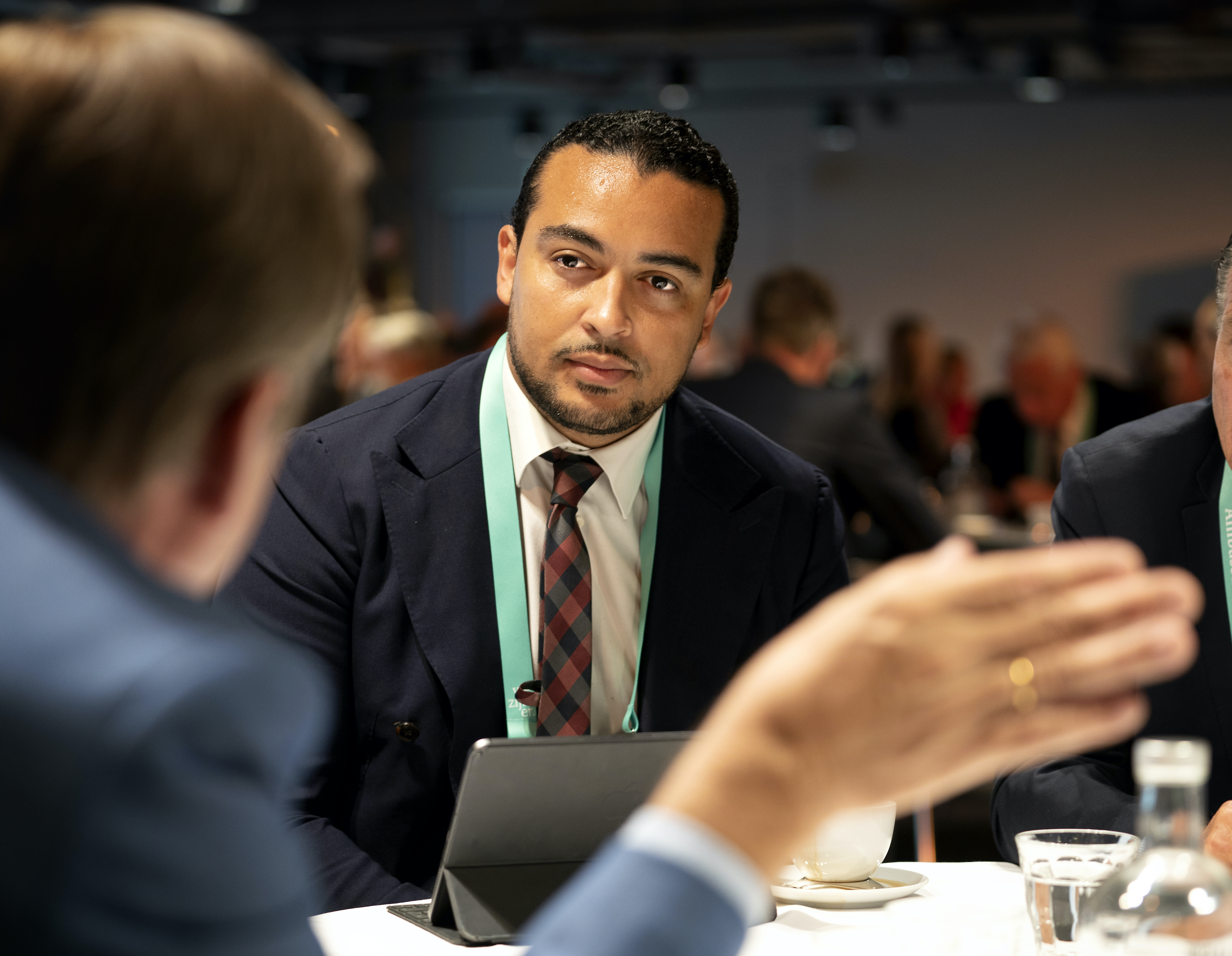
Ceder while attending a 2022 conference for ambassadors

He ran for member of parliament (MP) during the 2017 general election, being placed seventh on the party list. His party won five seats, and Ceder received 8,276 preferential votes – not enough to be elected. When MP Stieneke van der Graaf went on maternity leave in March 2019 and Ceder was asked to temporarily fill her seat, he declined, saying he wanted to continue his work as council member. He again appeared on the Christian Union's party list for the 2021 election as number four. During the anti-abortion Week of Life, he called for a reevaluation of the Dutch 24-week limit for legal abortions, arguing that some fetuses are viable before that time. Ceder also defended the five-day waiting period for abortions, also in case of rape, in an interview during the campaign. He was elected, having received 10,318 preference votes, and was sworn in as member of parliament on 31 March 2021. Ceder left the municipal council that same day. In the House, he served as his party's spokesperson for asylum, immigration, social affairs, employment, youth, foreign affairs, digital affairs, kingdom relations, history of slavery, and anti-discrimination.

A motion by Ceder was carried by the House in July 2021 in which he called for an independent investigation into the Netherlands' history of slavery. The results were finally published in the report State and Slavery. Furthermore, Ceder was critical of the cabinet for a lack of central leadership during the evacuations of Afghanistan following the fall of Kabul in August 2021. When the Dutch asylum system was suffering from capacity problems and refugees had to sleep outside at the Dutch application center in Ter Apel the following year, Ceder represented his party in negotiations among the coalition parties. The resulting asylum deal included additional funding for accommodation as well as the postponement of family reunions. Ceder defended the deal together with party leader Gert-Jan Segers during an extra party congress, saying that he regretted the latter compromise but that the deal on the whole was a step forward. Ceder also focused on municipal welfare, working on a bill to allow municipalities to be more lenient with reimbursements by recipients in case of mistakes. Furthermore, he presented a plan in 2023 to reform debt collection. He railed against the amount of money made by the industry and decried buy now, pay later services that make part of their profit through late payments. Ceder proposed that the creditor should keep responsibility over the debt collection to prevent malpractices by owners of resold debt, and he wanted to mandate collectors to investigate whether the debtor could pay the debt.

Ceder was an advocate of a ban of social media platform TikTok, which was especially popular amongst children. Its updated privacy policy had raised fears that it would allow the Chinese government to access user data.

He was re-elected to the House in November 2023, and his areas of expertise were expanded to include defense, education, culture, and science.

== Personal life ==
Ceder was a resident of the Amsterdam borough Zuidoost as of 2018, and he got married in January 2023. He is a member of the Safe Haven Church, which formerly belonged to the Pentecostal denomination Victory Outreach, and played a disciple in the 2018 edition of The Passion, that was held in his hometown. In his twenties, he danced and acted in plays. He also performs as a DJ.

Ceder has a stutter.

== Electoral history ==
Electoral history of Don Ceder
Year	Body	Party	Pos.	Votes	Result		Ref.
Year	Body	Party	Pos.	Votes	Party seats	Individual	Ref.
2017	House of Representatives	Christian Union	7	8,276	5 / 150	Lost	
2021	House of Representatives	Christian Union	4	10,318	5 / 150	Won	
2023	House of Representatives	Christian Union	3	11,213	3 / 150	Won	
2025	House of Representatives	Christian Union	3	15,405	3 / 150	Won	
2026	Amsterdam Municipal Council	Christian Union	7	836	0 / 45	Lost	
2026	Amsterdam-Zuidoost District Committee	Christian Union	7	480	1 / 11	Lost	
