= Bart Bikkers =

Dutch politician (born 1984)

Member of the House of Representatives
- In office 26 March 2025 – 11 November 2025
- Preceded by: Christianne van der Wal

Personal details
- Born: 23 November 1984 (age 41)
- Party: People's Party for Freedom and Democracy

Bart Bikkers (born 23 November 1984) is a Dutch politician who served as a member of the House of Representatives between March and November 2025. From 2018 to 2025, he served as alderman of Vlaardingen.
