= Farmer–Citizen Movement =

Political party in the Netherlands

Farmer–Citizen Movement BoerBurgerBeweging
- Abbreviation: BBB
- Leader: Henk Vermeer
- Chairperson: Erik Stegink
- Leader in the House of Representatives: Henk Vermeer
- Leader in the Senate: Ilona Lagas
- Founder: Caroline van der Plas; Henk Vermeer; Wim Groot Koerkamp
- Founded: 1 October 2019; 7 years ago
- Headquarters: Smeenkhof 12-d, Colmschate, Deventer
- Youth wing: BBB Jong
- Membership (2026): ▼12,014
- Ideology: Agrarianism; Right-wing populism
- Political position: Centre-right to right-wing
- European affiliation: None
- European Parliament group: ECR Group (since 2026) (Note: The party was formerly part of EPP Group (2024–2026).)
- Colours: Grass green
- Slogan: De stem van en voor het platteland ("The voice of and for the countryside")
- Senate: 11 / 75
- House of Representatives: 3 / 150
- States-Provincial: 119 / 572
- Water board: 118 / 518
- European Parliament: 2 / 31
- Benelux Parliament: 1 / 21

Website
- boerburgerbeweging.nl

The Farmer–Citizen Movement (Dutch: BoerBurgerBeweging [buːrˈbʏrɣərbəˌʋeːɣɪŋ]; BBB) is an agrarian and right-wing populist political party in the Netherlands. It is headquartered in Deventer, Overijssel. The current party leader is Henk Vermeer.

== History ==
The Farmer–Citizen Movement was founded on 1 November 2019 by agricultural journalist Caroline van der Plas, together with Wim Groot Koerkamp and Henk Vermeer from agricultural marketing firm ReMarkAble, in response to the widespread farmers' protests that had taken place earlier that month. On 17 October 2020, Van der Plas was unanimously chosen as the party's lead candidate. It won one seat at the 2021 general election.

The BBB won the 2023 provincial elections, winning the popular vote and receiving the most seats in all twelve provinces. Given that the provincial councils elect the Dutch Senate, the party was predicted to win 17 seats in the 2023 Senate election, the most of any party; it won 16 seats in the election.

On 1 September 2023, former JA21 MPs Nicki Pouw-Verweij and Derk Jan Eppink and former PVV MP Lilian Helder joined the BBB parliamentary group in the run-up to 2023 parliamentary elections, increasing the BBB's number of seats from one to four. BBB also presented Mona Keijzer as candidate for Prime Minister. The party won seven seats with nearly half a million votes.

=== Nitrogen crisis and policy asymmetry ===
The Dutch nitrogen crisis escalated after a 2019 Council of State ruling invalidated the government's deposition calculation method, halting projects in Natura 2000 areas. The government targeted a 50% emissions cut by 2030, with agriculture — responsible for ~46% of ammonia emissions — facing up to 70% of reductions via herd cuts and farm buyouts, while sectors like aviation (13% NOx) received leniency. Farmers protested this asymmetry, citing prior voluntary reductions (nearly two-thirds since 1990) and the sector's efficiency (high yields on 1.8% of land). BBB advocates technological solutions (e.g., low-emission feed, precision fertilization) over forced closures.

=== Schoof cabinet and collapse (2024–2025) ===
BBB joined the Schoof cabinet on 2 July 2024 as the smallest partner in a PVV–VVD–NSC–BBB coalition, securing influence over agricultural policy. It achieved a shift from mandatory to voluntary farm buyouts and delayed the 2030 nitrogen target to 2035. The cabinet collapsed on 3 June 2025 after PVV withdrew over asylum disputes, reducing BBB to caretaker status. A second breakdown followed in August 2025. At the October 2025 general election, BBB lost three of their seven seats.

== Ideology and platform ==
The BBB is an agrarian and right-wing populist party generally placed on the centre-right to right-wing. Founded in 2019 amid Dutch farmers' protests over nitrogen policy — criticized for targeting agriculture (46% of emissions) for up to 70% of cuts while sparing industry and aviation — it has also been described as conservative, centrist, Christian-democratic, or partially centre-left. Though not far-right — and unclassified as extremist by Dutch intelligence (AIVD) — it has drawn support from far-right elements. The party shifted rightward after PVV and JA21 MPs joined in September 2023.

In European politics, the party is regarded as Eurosceptic. The BBB supports Dutch membership of the European Union (EU) for trading purposes, but wants to reduce the power of the EU "to a level of how the EEC was once intended" and opposes federalisation of the EU. The party argues that each country and region within the EU should be allowed to maintain its identity and culture without interference. It stated its intention to join the European People's Party but unlike other EPP parties, BBB did not join the Christian Group in the Benelux Parliament nor does BBB sit in the EPP group in the Parliamentary Assembly of the Council of Europe.

On foreign policy, the party also supports Dutch membership of NATO and has called for providing Ukraine with F-16s.

On immigration and asylum, the party supports accommodating refugees fleeing wars but prefers they be helped close to the region of where they are from rather than encouraging migration to the Netherlands and intends for most refugees to return home once the conflict is over. It also calls for immigrants to already be employed and financially self-supporting before moving to the Netherlands, and they must learn Dutch, work and pay tax in the Netherlands for at least five years before becoming eligible for permanent residency. The party supports deporting illegal immigrants.

The party considers itself to support both food politics and rural development. It opposed the Rutte government's proposals to mitigate the human impact on the nitrogen cycle following the Nitrogen crisis in the Netherlands.

Party leader Caroline van der Plas has stated that the Party for the Animals and animal rights organization Wakker Dier are two organisations with whom she disagrees with 99% of their viewpoints. She saw the effect of their campaigns and wanted to provide an alternative perspective on social media.

In the 2021 general election, the party focused its campaign on issues important to rural and agrarian voters, including pledges for a "Ministry of the Countryside" located at least 100 kilometers from The Hague, and a removal of the ban on neonicotinoids. The party called for a Right to Agriculture Act, which would allow for farmers to have more say on agricultural expansion matters, in response to local opposition to pig and goat farms over public health, environmental and agricultural concerns.

In March 2026, the party left the European People's Party Group in the European Parliament and joined the European Conservatives and Reformists Group.

== Election results ==
=== House of Representatives ===
Election	Lead candidate	List	Votes	%	Seats	+/–	Government
2021	Caroline van der Plas	List	104,319	1.00	1 / 150	New	Opposition
2023	Caroline van der Plas	List	485,551	4.65	7 / 150	▲6	Coalition
2025	Caroline van der Plas	List	279,916	2.65	4 / 150	▼3	Opposition

=== Senate ===
Election	Lead candidate	Votes	Weight	%	Seats	+/–
2023	Ilona Lagas	137	36,976	20.66	16 / 75	New

=== European Parliament ===
Election	List	Votes	%	Seats	+/–	EP Group
2024	List	336,953	5.41	2 / 31	New	EPP

== See also ==
- Farmers' Party (Netherlands)
- List of agrarian parties
