= Jeroen Hartsuiker =

Dutch politician (born 1984)

Member of the House of Representatives
- In office 25 June 2025 – 11 November 2025
- Preceded by: Thierry Aartsen

Personal details
- Born: 18 May 1984 (age 41)
- Party: People's Party for Freedom and Democracy

Jeroen Hartsuiker (born 18 May 1984) is a Dutch politician who served as a member of the House of Representatives between June and November 2025. From 2022 to 2025, he served as alderman of Borger-Odoorn.
