= Dutch parliamentary inquiry into the COVID-19 pandemic =

Inquiry of the House of Representatives of the Netherlands (since 2024)

The parliamentary inquiry into the COVID-19 pandemic is an ongoing parliamentary inquiry in the Netherlands by the Dutch House of Representatives that is investigating the government response to the COVID-19 pandemic.

On 4 November 2021, the House of Representatives unanimously adopted a motion by VVD MP Aukje de Vries calling for this parliamentary inquiry. Due to disagreement about the research proposal, the Speaker of the House of Representatives Vera Bergkamp decided to postpone the inquiry. A motion by PVV parliamentary leader Geert Wilders after the general election of 22 November 2023 to continue the inquiry was unanimously adopted. The committee carrying out the investigation first convened on 6 February 2024.

== Temporary committee ==
A temporary committee had been established to prepare for the inquiry, most importantly a research proposal. At the start on 6 July 2022, this consisted of the members:

- Khadija Arib (chair, PvdA)
- Ulysse Ellian (vice-chair, VVD)
- Pieter Omtzigt (Independent)
- Wybren van Haga (Group Van Haga)
- Vicky Maeijer (PVV)
- Hilde Palland (CDA)
- Pepijn van Houwelingen (FvD)
- Nicki Pouw-Verweij (JA21)
- Marijke van Beukering-Huijbregts (D66)
- Liane den Haan (Independent)

After the start of the committee, the Presidium of the House of Representatives received reports about inappropriate behavior by Arib when she was Speaker of the House of Representatives. The immediate reason for the reports was that Arib, as committee chairman, directed the civil servants of the committee. When these reports came out in September 2022 and an investigation was announced, the committee's civil servants unanimously indicated that they were happy to work with Arib. However, Arib felt so damaged by the reports and the announced investigation that she decided to leave the House and thus the committee. As committee chair, she was succeeded by vice-chair Mariëlle Paul, who after a few months had replaced party colleague Ellian as committee member and vice-chair.

Van Houwelingen and Van Haga's membership of the committee was controversial from the start, because they regularly spread conspiracy theories about COVID-19 and its vaccines. The committee mutually agreed to be cautious in expressing party political positions regarding COVID-19. At the end of September there was a fuss because Van Houwelingen had edited and posted a photo in which it appeared as if Minister of Health Ernst Kuipers was raising a Nazi flag. Van Houwelingen also continued to speak out about COVID-19 in various programs. Van Haga also took part in a debate about COVID-19 in February 2023, against the agreements. Part of the committee indicated anonymously in the NRC that it therefore intended to ask Van Haga and Van Houwelingen to resign from the committee. Another part of the committee was surprised by that intention and frustrated about the leak. After the subsequent committee meeting, no one left the committee.

The research proposal was sent to parliament on 25 May 2023. Under that proposal, the inquiry would last until 2026. Only four parties registered for the inquiry; PVV, FvD, Group van Haga and Independent Den Haan. VVD, D66, CDA and GroenLinks wanted to wait for the Dutch Safety Boards third report before deciding whether they wanted to delegate MPs. GroenLinks also indicated that the question was too one-sided, namely focusing on whether too many measures had been taken. Because this was not the intended broad composition, Speaker of the House Vera Bergkamp decided in June 2023 to postpone the inquiry. A motion by Van Haga in September 2023 to start the inquiry as soon as possible was rejected by a wide majority.

== Inquiry ==
After the 22 November 2023 general election, the House adopted a motion to start with the inquiry again. The committee conducting the inquiry first convened on 6 February 2024, and Daan de Kort (VVD) was selected to serve as its chair. Freek Jansen (FvD) had stepped down from the House of Representatives the month before such that Van Houwelingen (FvD) could succeed him and thus participate in the inquiry on behalf of his party. Newspaper NRC noted that all other members of the committee were newcomers in the House, having been sworn in two months before. The committee's goal was to investigate the political balancing of public health and other societal interests, the observance of basic rights, and the role of the healthcare sector in decisions during the pandemic. The inquiry's conclusion is planned for late 2026.

De Kort warned in October 2024, during its initial preparatory phase, that the inquiry might be delayed due to a disagreement with the Schoof cabinet. The committee had requested unredacted chat messages of civil servants, while the government was reluctant due to the potential presence of sensitive personal data. After an advice from the Council of State, the cabinet agreed to hand over the chat messages.

In 2025, the committee had held 87 confidential preliminary interviews. In the 2025 Dutch general election, all members except for chairman De Kort were not reelected. Henk-Jan Oosterhuis (D66) and Songül Mutluer (GL-PvdA) joined in November 2025. Oosterhuis was replaced by Dion Huidekooper (D66), who joined together with Annelotte Lammers (Markuszower Group) and André Poortman (CDA).

=== Committee composition ===
- Daan de Kort (chair, VVD)
- Anita Pijpelink (vice-chair, until November 2025, GL–PvdA)
- Songül Mutluer (since November 2025, GL-PvdA)
- Peter Smitskam (until November 2025, PVV)
- Sander van Waveren (December 2024–November 2025, NSC)
- Rosanne Hertzberger (until November 2024, NSC)
- Claudia van Zanten (until July 2024, BBB)
- Mariska Rikkers (May 2025–November 2025, BBB)
- Pepijn van Houwelingen (until November 2024, FvD)
- Gideon van Meijeren (13 May 2025–27 May 2025, FvD)
- Henk-Jan Oosterhuis (November 2025–February 2026, D66)
- Dion Huidekooper (since February 2026, D66)
- Annelotte Lammers (since February 2026, Markuszower Group)
- André Poortman (since February 2026, CDA)

== Public ==
The committee will be holding 51 public hearings between 29 May and 10 September, with a break in the summer. The witnesses include:

- Bruno Bruins, Minister for Medical Care (2017–2020)
- Mark Rutte, Prime Minister (2010–2024)
- Ferd Grapperhaus, Minister of Justice and Security (2017–2022)
- Mona Keijzer, State Secretary of Economic Affairs and Climate Policy (2017–2021)
- Hugo de Jonge, Minister of Health, Welfare and Sport (2017–2022)
- Klaas Dijkhoff, Member of House of Representatives (2010–2015, 2017–2021)
- Fleur Agema, Member of House of Representatives (2006–2024)
- Jaap van Dissel, Chairman of the Outbreak Management Team
- Marion Koopmans, Member of the Outbreak Management Team
- Maurice de Hond, Pollster
- Khadija Arib, Speaker of the House of Representatives (2015–2021)
- Pieter-Jaap Aalbersberg, National Coordinator for Security and Counterterrorism (2019–2025)
- Lisa Westerveld, Member of House of Representatives (2017–present)
- Simone Roos, Secretary General of the House of Representatives (2018–2022)
- Femke Halsema, Mayor of Amsterdam (2018–present)
- Ingrid van Engelshoven, Minister of Education, Culture and Science (2017–2022)
- Arie Slob, Minister for Primary and Secondary Education and Media (2017–2022)
- Paul Rosenmöller, Chair of the VO-Raad
- Margrite Kalverboer, Childrens's Ombudsman (2016–present)
- Diederik Gommers, Member of the Outbreak Management Team
- Carola Schouten, Deputy Prime Minister
- Kajsa Ollongren, Deputy Prime Minister
- Kees van der Staaij, Member of House of Representatives
- Kim Putters
