= Rosanne Hertzberger =

Dutch politician (born 1984)

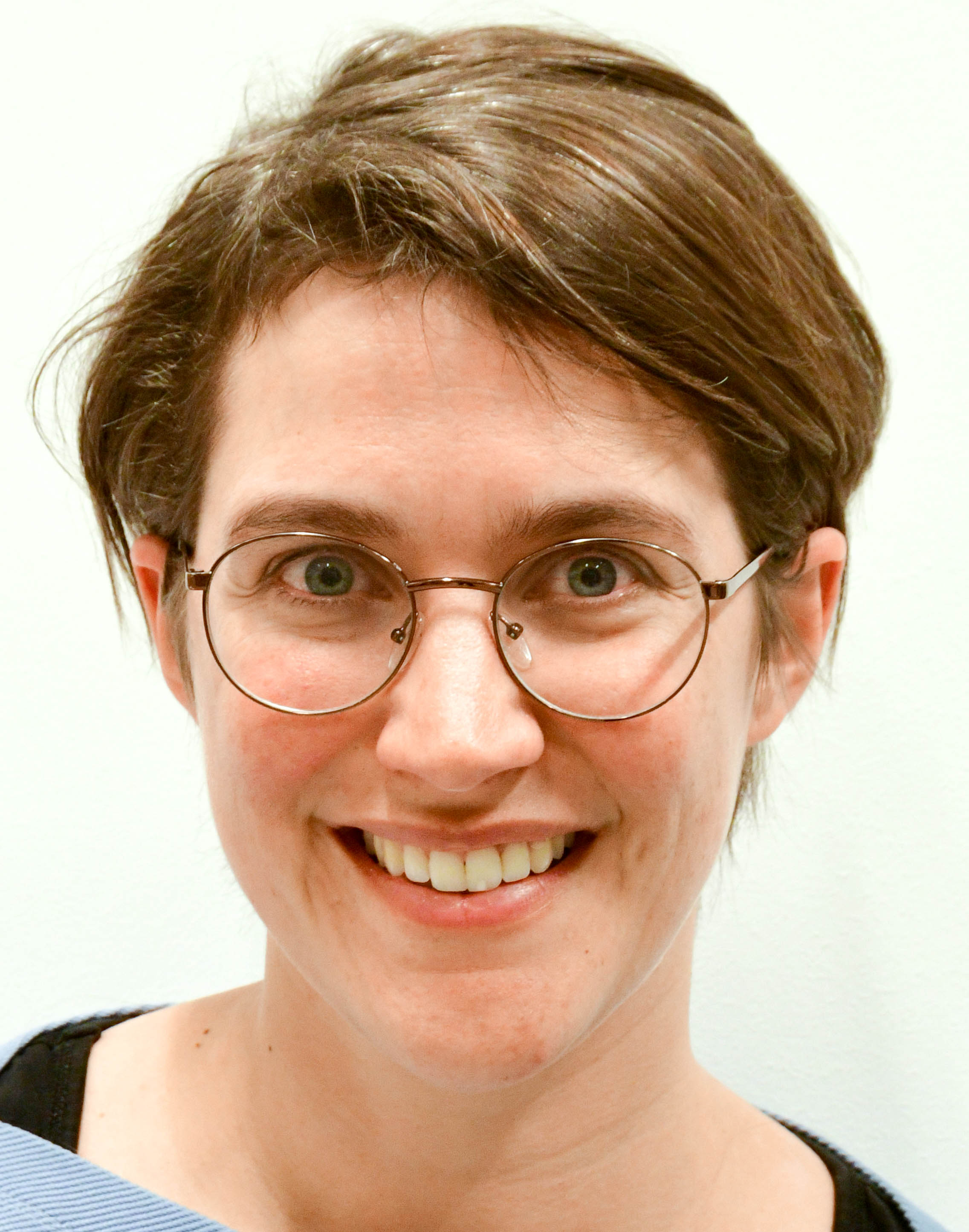
- Rosanne Hertzberger in 2018

Member of the House of Representatives
- In office 1 July 2025 – 11 November 2025
- In office 6 December 2023 – 19 November 2024
- Succeeded by: Sander van Waveren

Personal details
- Born: 9 September 1984 (age 42) Rotterdam, Netherlands
- Party: New Social Contract
- Education: Delft University of Technology; Leiden University; University of Amsterdam

Rosanne Yente Hertzberger (Dutch: [roːˈzɑnə ˈɦɛrtsbɛrɣər]; born 9 September 1984) is a Dutch microbiologist and politician of New Social Contract (NSC).

== Early career ==
Hertzberger was a microbiologist, working as a researcher at Vrije Universiteit Amsterdam. She was a columnist for NRC from 2009 until 2023.

== Politics ==
She was elected to the Dutch Parliament in the 2023 Dutch general election, and her focus was on higher education, medical ethics, and the nitrogen crisis in the Netherlands. Hertzberger was on the committee carrying out the parliamentary inquiry into the Dutch response to the COVID-19 pandemic, which commenced in February 2024. After New Social Contract formed a coalition with the right-wing populist Party for Freedom (PVV) and two other parties, she declared that she felt great discomfort about her party's cooperation with the PVV. Hertzberger advocated in a policy memorandum for further research into a rise of euthanasia among individuals under 30 with mental disorders, and she proposed drafting media guidelines on euthanasia reporting to mitigate contagion effects. She also called for an investigation into gender-affirming care.

On 15 November 2024, State Secretary Nora Achahbar (NSC) resigned, citing "polarizing interactions during the past weeks" in response to Amsterdam attacks targeting supporters of the Israeli football club Maccabi Tel Aviv F.C. Media outlets reported offensive, radical, and potentially racist remarks made during a Council of Ministers meeting, with State Secretary Jurgen Nobel stating that a significant portion of Islamic youth did not endorse Dutch norms and values, referring to the perpetrators of the attacks. A collapse of the Schoof cabinet was averted during crisis talks, where it was decided that no other NSC cabinet members would step down. On 19 November, Hertzberger and Femke Zeedijk announced their resignations from the House. Hertzberger said that cabinet members had uttered "completely inappropriate statements," both publicly and behind the scenes. She added that "basic norms of decency, civility [...] and how one speaks about Dutch citizens" had been disregarded.

She became director of NSC's think tank in January 2025.

== Electoral history ==
Electoral history of Rosanne Hertzberger
Year	Body	Party	Pos.	Votes	Result		Ref.
Year	Body	Party	Pos.	Votes	Party seats	Individual	Ref.
2023	House of Representatives	New Social Contract	17	4,613	20	Won	

== See also ==
- List of members of the House of Representatives of the Netherlands, 2023–2025
