= Michiel van Nispen =

Dutch politician (born 1982)

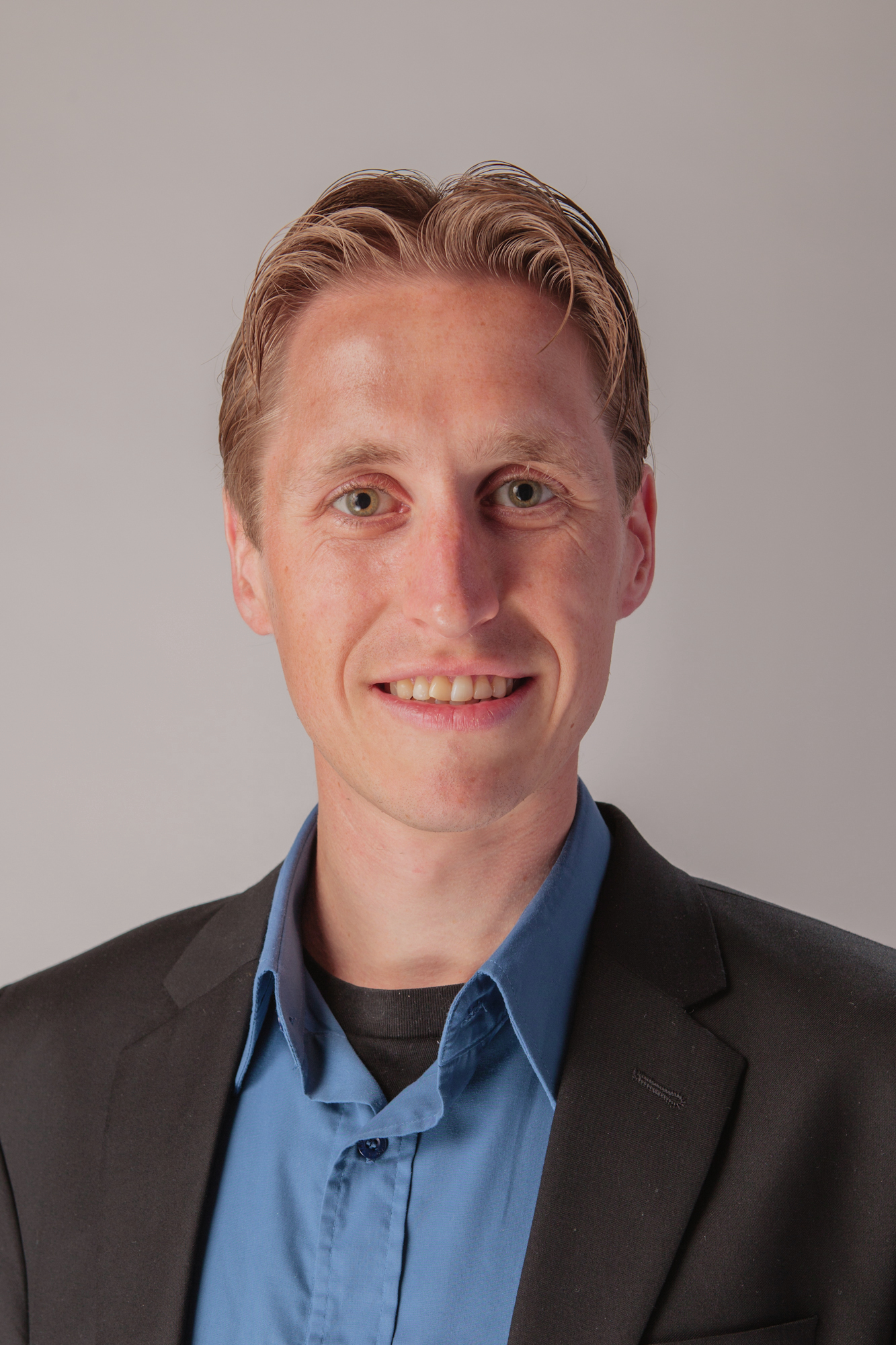

Member of the House of Representatives of the Netherlands
- In office 2 April 2014 – 11 November 2025

Personal details
- Born: 14 October 1982 (age 43) Breda, Netherlands
- Party: Socialist Party

Michiel van Nispen (born 14 October 1982) is a Dutch politician for the Socialist Party. He has been a member of the House of Representatives of the Netherlands from 2 April 2014, when he replaced Jan de Wit, until 11 November 2025.

== Education and career ==
Van Nispen studied Dutch law at Tilburg University between 2000 and 2004. He then joined a law firm and did a master's degree in international and European public law between 2006 and 2007. Since then he worked for the Socialist Party group in the House of Representatives, occupying himself with the topic of Justice. Starting from his 2023 re-election to the House, Van Nispen was the Socialist Party's spokesperson for justice, safety, migration, governance, and sports.

In February 2024, a motion by Michiel van Nispen and Mohammed Mohandis (GL-PvdA) was carried to reintroduce swimming lessons in elementary schools. They called on the government to prepare scenarios for their initiative in response to declining swimming skills among youths. In May, the House passed another motion by Van Nispen to ban international adoptions, which he called harmful to children. New applications were halted by the cabinet the following months, and it was later announced that no adoptions would be allowed starting in 2030.

Along with Mirjam Bikker (CU), Van Nispen announced a bill with several measures to tackle online gambling issues, including a ban on advertisements and credit card payments and increased contributions from operators toward addiction prevention. His party favored prohibiting online gambling, which had been legalized in 2021, but such a proposal was unlikely to pass the House. The House passed a motion by Van Nispen and Sandra Palmen (NSC) urging the government to adopt recommendations by Jos Silvis to seek legal advice from a range of law firms. Previously, the government had relied almost exclusively on the firm Pels Rijcken.

He did not run for re-election in 2025, and his term ended on 11 November 2025.

== Electoral history ==
Electoral history of Michiel van Nispen
| Year | Body | Party | Pos. | Votes | Result | | Ref. |
| Year | Body | Party | Pos. | Votes | Party seats | Individual | Ref. |
|---|---|---|---|---|---|---|---|
| 2010 | House of Representatives | Socialist Party | 25 | 1,025 | 15 / 150 | Lost | |
| 2012 | House of Representatives | Socialist Party | 17 | 1,206 | 15 / 150 | Lost (Note: Van Nispen was appointed to the body later during the term due to a vacancy.) | |
| 2017 | House of Representatives | Socialist Party | 7 | 2,261 | 14 / 150 | Won | |
| 2021 | House of Representatives | Socialist Party | 4 | 2,264 | 9 / 150 | Won | |
| 2023 | House of Representatives | Socialist Party | 5 | 1,677 | 5 / 150 | Won | |
| 2026 | Breda Municipal Council | Socialist Party | 21 (Note: Van Nispen participated as a lijstduwer.) | 55 | 1 / 39 | Lost | |
