= Femke Zeedijk =

Dutch politician (born 1974)

Member of the House of Representatives
- In office 6 December 2023 – 19 November 2024
- Succeeded by: Willem Koops

Member of the Geldrop-Mierlo Municipal Council
- In office 2013–2013

Personal details
- Born: Femke Annechien Raeven; 7 February 1974 (age 52) Utrecht, Netherlands
- Party: New Social Contract
- Other political affiliations: Democrats 66
- Education: Utrecht University (MA)

Femke Annechien Zeedijk-Raeven (pronounced [ˈfɛmkə ˈzeːdɛik ˈraːvə(n)]; née Raeven; born 7 February 1974) is a Dutch politician of the New Social Contract (NSC) party.

== Early life and career ==
Zeedijk was born in 1974 in Utrecht, and she studied mathematics at Utrecht University from 1990 to 1995, graduating with a Master of Arts degree. Between 1996 and 2013, she worked for professional services network PwC, airline KLM, an insurance company, and Rabobank. Zeedijk was an active member of the social liberal Democrats 66 (D66) party, serving as a temporary member of the Geldrop-Mierlo Municipal Council in 2013. She started working the following year for ASML, where she eventually became a strategic advisor.

== House of Representatives ==
Zeedijk switched to NSC, when it was founded in 2023, and she was elected to the House of Representatives in the 2023 general election. Her focus was on economic affairs, international trade, and development cooperation. During debates on the 2025 budget, Zeedijk argued that the decoupling of the development aid budget from the size of the Dutch economy had not been agreed to by coalition parties. However, she refused to support a motion of the opposition to restore the coupling, opting instead to renegotiate the issue ahead of the upcoming Spring Memorandum, in which budget revisions are included.

On 15 November 2024, State Secretary Nora Achahbar (NSC) resigned, citing "polarizing interactions during the past weeks" in response to Amsterdam attacks targeting supporters of the Israeli football club Maccabi Tel Aviv F.C. Media outlets reported offensive, radical, and potentially racist remarks made during a Council of Ministers meeting, with State Secretary Jurgen Nobel stating that a significant portion of Islamic youth did not endorse Dutch norms and values, referring to the perpetrators of the attacks. A collapse of the Schoof cabinet was averted during crisis talks, where it was decided that no other NSC cabinet members would step down. On 19 November, Zeedijk and Rosanne Hertzberger announced their resignations from the House. Zeedijk, referencing Achahbar's departure, stated that it demonstrated a perception of Dutch-Moroccan individuals as unwelcome. She criticized Prime Minister Dick Schoof and his cabinet for their unwillingness to engage in meaningful self-reflection, adding that for her, "discrimination has been given a face." Zeedijk also expressed frustration with what she described as a lack of civility and constructive solutions in the political arena.

== Electoral history ==
Electoral history of Femke Zeedijk-Raeven
Year	Body	Party	Pos.	Votes	Result		Ref.
Year	Body	Party	Pos.	Votes	Party seats	Individual	Ref.
2023	House of Representatives	New Social Contract	12	5,197	20	Won	

== See also ==
- List of members of the House of Representatives of the Netherlands, 2023–present
