= Sander van Waveren =

Dutch politician (born 1980)

Member of the House of Representatives
- In office 3 December 2024 – 11 November 2025
- Preceded by: Rosanne Hertzberger

Member of the Utrecht Municipal Council
- In office 9 December 2010 – 17 December 2020
- Preceded by: Harm Janssen
- Succeeded by: Bert van Steeg

Personal details
- Born: Alexander van Waveren; 3 March 1980 (age 46) Haarlem, Netherlands
- Party: New Social Contract (since 2023); Christian Democratic Appeal (until 2023)
- Education: Utrecht University
- Occupation: Politician; civil servant; consultant

Alexander "Sander" van Waveren (Dutch: [ˈsɑndər vɑɱ ˈʋaːvərə(n)]; born 3 March 1980) is a Dutch civil servant and politician. He served on the Utrecht Municipal Council on behalf of the Christian Democratic Appeal (CDA) from 2010 to 2020, and he was a member of the House of Representatives between December 2024 and November 2025 after he had switched to the party New Social Contract (NSC).

== Early life and career ==
Van Waveren was born in 1980 in Haarlem. His father was a pastor, and Van Waveren attended a gymnasium school in Eindhoven. From 1999 to 2006, he studied social geography and urban planning at Utrecht University, and he did an internship at the European Parliament.

Van Waveren started his career at a public sector consultancy, where he was specialized in spatial planning and housing, and he worked as an adviser for the Sliedrecht municipal government starting in 2012. He became bureau head of the Dutch Association of Municipal Secretaries in 2016, and he became municipal secretary of Laren, North Holland in 2020. He simultaneously served as chair of a cooperative managing parking across several municipalities.

== Politics ==
Van Waveren ran for the Utrecht Municipal Council in the March 2010 election as the fifth candidate of the Christian Democratic Appeal (CDA). He was not elected, as the party won four seats. He assisted the CDA's parliamentary group until 9 December 2010, when he was appointed to the council to succeed a fellow councilor who had resigned. Van Waveren became the party's parliamentary leader in 2013, and he was re-elected in 2014 and in 2018 as lead candidate. He left the Utrecht Municipal Council on 17 December 2020, midway through his term.

He joined NSC when it was founded by former CDA member Pieter Omtzigt ahead of the November 2023 general election. Van Waveren was the party's 27th candidate, and he was not elected to the House of Representatives, as NSC won 20 seats. He became administrative secretary of its parliamentary group in September 2024. Because of his position on the party list, Van Waveren was sworn into the House on 3 December 2024 following Femke Zeedijk's resignation. He became NSC's spokesperson on the interior, public administration, and the rule of law. He did not run for re-election in 2025, and his term ended on 11 November 2025.

=== House committee assignments ===
- Committee for the Interior
- Parliamentary committee of inquiry into COVID-19

== Personal life ==
As of 2024, Van Waveren lived in Utrecht. He has served as chair of sports club UVV Utrecht and as treasurer of a music education foundation.

== Electoral history ==
Electoral history of Sander van Waveren
Year	Body	Party	Pos.	Votes	Result		Ref.
Year	Body	Party	Pos.	Votes	Party seats	Individual	Ref.
2010	Utrecht Municipal Council	Christian Democratic Appeal	5	110	4	Lost (Note: Van Waveren was appointed to the body later during the term due to a vacancy.)	
2014	Utrecht Municipal Council	Christian Democratic Appeal	1	5,017	3	Won	
2018	Utrecht Municipal Council	Christian Democratic Appeal	1	4,600	2	Won	
2022	Utrecht Municipal Council	Christian Democratic Appeal	24 (Note: Van Waveren participated as lijstduwer.)	90	3	Lost	
2023	Senate	Christian Democratic Appeal	18	0 (Note: To account for population differences between provinces, a weighted vote total of 0 was used.)	6	Lost	
2023	House of Representatives	New Social Contract	27	180	20	Lost	
