= Gommers =

Gommers is a surname. Notable people with the surname include:

- Diederik Gommers (born 1964), Dutch physician
- Frans Gommers (1917–1996), Belgian footballer
- Jan Gommers (1916–2002), Dutch racing cyclist
- Mia Gommers (born 1939), Dutch athlete
