= Sandra Palmen =

Dutch politician (born 1972)

State Secretary for Benefits Redress
- Incumbent
- Assumed office 5 September 2025
- Prime Minister: Dick Schoof (2025–2026); Rob Jetten (since 2026)
- Minister: Eelco Heinen
- In office 12 December 2024 – 23 August 2025
- Prime Minister: Dick Schoof
- Minister: Eelco Heinen
- Preceded by: Nora Achahbar

Member of the House of Representatives
- In office 6 December 2023 – 12 December 2024
- Succeeded by: Ria de Korte

Personal details
- Born: Sandra Schlangen; 17 February 1972 (age 54) Cuijk, Netherlands
- Party: Independent (since 2025)
- Other political affiliations: New Social Contract (2023–2025)
- Children: 2
- Education: Leiden University
- Occupation: Politician; jurist; civil servant

Sandra Palmen-Schlangen (born 17 February 1972) is a Dutch jurist, civil servant and independent politician, formerly affiliated with New Social Contract (NSC). She was elected to the House of Representatives in the November 2023 general election. Since December 2024, she has served as State Secretary for Benefits Redress in the Schoof and Jetten cabinets. In this position, she is responsible for restorations following the childcare benefits scandal.

== Early life and career ==
Palmen was born on 17 February 1972 in Cuijk, and she studied tax economics at the School of Higher Commercial Education in Arnhem between 1991 and 1995. She started her 26-year career at the Ministry of Finance in 1997 as a processing official for the Tax and Customs Administration. At the same time, she studied tax law at Leiden University from 1999 to 2001. She later held positions as team leader, policy advisor, and specialist coordinator.

In March 2017, when she was a jurist at the Tax and Customs Administration, Palmen wrote an internal memo about childcare benefits recipients who had been wrongly accused of fraud starting in 2015. She called the organization's conduct "reprehensible", and she recommended victims to be compensated. The document, later dubbed the Palmen Memo, was ignored within the Tax and Customs Administration, but it received attention in 2020 after the media started uncovering the abuse. The childcare benefits scandal resulted in the resignation of the third Rutte cabinet in January 2021. The memo was released in October 2020 ahead of the Parliamentary Interrogation on Childcare Benefits, during which Palmen testified.

Next to her position at the Ministry of Finance, she became a judge ad hoc at the Administrative High Court in 2021 and a marriage officiant in 2023.

== Political career ==
Palmen joined New Social Contract (NSC) when it was founded ahead of the November 2023 general election by Pieter Omtzigt, who had helped uncover the childcare benefits scandal. She was elected to the House of Representatives as the party's fifth candidate. She cited the childcare benefits scandal as her motivation to enter politics, and she has advocated for a "government that serves the public interest and acts in service of society". Palmen's portfolio in the House consisted of the interior, democracy, legal protection, and poverty.

NSC supports the establishment of a constitutional court, and she has criticized the Netherlands's ban on judicial constitutional review. The governing coalition, including NSC, agreed to pursue the creation of such a court. The House passed a motion by Palmen and Michiel van Nispen (SP) urging the government to adopt recommendations by Jos Silvis to seek legal advice from a range of law firms. Previously, the government had relied almost exclusively on the firm Pels Rijcken. Palmen proposed several adjustments to the social safety net with Mohammed Mohandis (GL/PvdA) to simplify the system and to make it more forgiving to those in poverty.

On 12 December 2024, she succeeded Nora Achahbar as State Secretary for Benefits Redress in the Schoof cabinet following her resignation. Her portfolio includes the aftermath of the Dutch childcare benefits scandal and reforms to the benefits system. The cabinet aimed to finish the recovery operation for the scandal's victims by 2027 despite a slow pace of procedures. Palmen opined that the operation had been erected too quickly, before the entirety of the scandal had become visible and before victims had given their input. An emergency committee requested by her predecessor concluded in January 2025 that the operation would take between 15 and 20 more years in its current approach and that government agencies were unsuitable to determine compensation because of their lack of generosity. They recommended that the recovery operation be handled mostly through the private Foundation (Equal) Worthy Recovery, established by Princess Laurentien of the Netherlands.

On 23 August 2025, NSC left the government and Palmen resigned. She returned to her position in the Schoof cabinet on 5 September 2025 as an independent politician.

=== House committee assignments ===
- Committee for Digital Affairs (chair)
- Committee for the Interior
- Committee for Justice and Security
- Temporary committee Fundamental rights and constitutional review
- Art committee
- Contact group Belgium
- Contact group Germany
- Committee for Asylum and Migration

== Personal life ==
As of 2024, Palmen lived in Leersum. She is married and has two children.

== Electoral history ==
Electoral history of Sandra Palmen
Year	Body	Party	Pos.	Votes	Result		Ref.
Year	Body	Party	Pos.	Votes	Party seats	Individual	Ref.
2023	House of Representatives	New Social Contract	5	7,577	20	Won	

Political offices
Preceded by Nora Achahbar	State Secretary for Benefits Redress; 2024–present	Incumbent
