= Peter Smitskam =

Dutch politician (born 1958)

Member of the House of Representatives
- In office 6 December 2023 – 11 November 2025

Member of the Municipal Council of Zoetermeer

Personal details
- Born: 2 April 1958 (age 68) The Hague, Netherlands
- Party: PVV
- Occupation: Politician

Peter Smitskam (born 2 April 1958 in The Hague) is a Dutch politician from the Party for Freedom.

Smitskam was born in The Hague in 1958. Before entering politics he worked as an IT security consultant in various locations including Tel Aviv, Munich and Amsterdam before founding a cybersecurity business. He first began working for the PVV in 2016, and he is a member of the Municipal Council of Zoetermeer.

In the 2023 Dutch general election, Smitskam was elected to the Dutch House of Representatives. He was the PVV's spokesperson for administrative law, family law, private law, and gambling, and he served on the committee carrying out the parliamentary inquiry into the Dutch response to the COVID-19 pandemic, which commenced in February 2024. One year into the House's term, Algemeen Dagblad noted that Smitskam was among the parliamentarians with the least debate contributions; Smitskam had talked for six minutes in total, during one plenary and one committee debate. He was not re-elected in October 2025, and his term ended on 11 November.

== House committee assignments ==
- Committee for Justice and Security
- Parliamentary committee of inquiry into COVID-19
- Committee for Asylum and Migration

== Electoral history ==
Electoral history of Peter Smitskam
Year	Body	Party	Pos.	Votes	Result		Ref.
Year	Body	Party	Pos.	Votes	Party seats	Individual	Ref.
2021	House of Representatives	Party for Freedom	39	153	17	Lost	
2023	House of Representatives	Party for Freedom	28	240	37	Won	
2025	House of Representatives	Party for Freedom	35	156	26	Lost	

== See also ==
- List of members of the House of Representatives of the Netherlands, 2023–2025
