= Willem Koops =

Dutch politician (born 1973)

Member of the House of Representatives
- In office 3 December 2024 – 11 November 2025
- Preceded by: Femke Zeedijk

Personal details
- Born: Willem J. Koops; 24 October 1973 (age 52) Delfzijl, Netherlands
- Party: New Social Contract
- Education: Vrije Universiteit Amsterdam
- Occupation: Politician; lawyer

Willem J. Koops (Dutch: [ˈʋɪləm ˈkoːps]; born 24 October 1973) is a Dutch lawyer and politician of New Social Contract (NSC). He was a member of the House of Representatives between December 2024 and November 2025.

== Early life and legal career ==
Koops was born in 1973 in Delfzijl, and he attended the Gemeentelijk Gymnasium Hilversum. He studied English language and chemistry at Washtenaw Community College in Ann Arbor Charter Township, Michigan from 1991 to 1992 and Dutch law at the Vrije Universiteit Amsterdam from 1998 to 2001. During the latter period, he spent some time at Paris-Sorbonne University studying criminal law.

Koops became a lawyer in 2002 for Stibbe in Amsterdam, and he subsequently worked for several other firms in Rotterdam, Amsterdam, and The Hague. He served as a partner, and he specialized in fraud cases, representing real estate entrepreneurs Rudy Stroink and Roger Lips among others. Koops was a judge ad hoc in Gelderland at the same time.

== Politics ==
He joined NSC when it was founded by Pieter Omtzigt ahead of the November 2023 general election. Koops was the party's 25th candidate, but he was not elected to the House of Representatives as NSC won 20 seats. Because of his position on the party list, he became a member of parliament on 3 December 2024 following Femke Zeedijk's resignation. His portfolio included legal protection and criminal prosecution. Along with Mpanzu Bamenga (D66), he introduced a bill the same month to explicitly prohibit racial profiling during fraud detection and criminal investigations. They argued insufficient protection against the practice existed despite the Constitution's discrimination ban and other anti-discrimination legislation. Koops was not re-elected in October 2025, as NSC lost all its seats, and his term ended on 11 November.

=== House committee assignments ===
- Committee for Justice and Security
- Committee for Digital Affairs
- Contact group United States

== Personal life ==
As of 2024, Koops lived in The Hague.

== Electoral history ==
Electoral history of Willem Koops
Year	Body	Party	Pos.	Votes	Result		Ref.
Year	Body	Party	Pos.	Votes	Party seats	Individual	Ref.
2023	House of Representatives	New Social Contract	25	213	20	Lost (Note: Koops was appointed to the body later during the term due to a vacancy.)	
2025	House of Representatives	New Social Contract	11	211	0	Lost	
