= Steggerda =

- Village
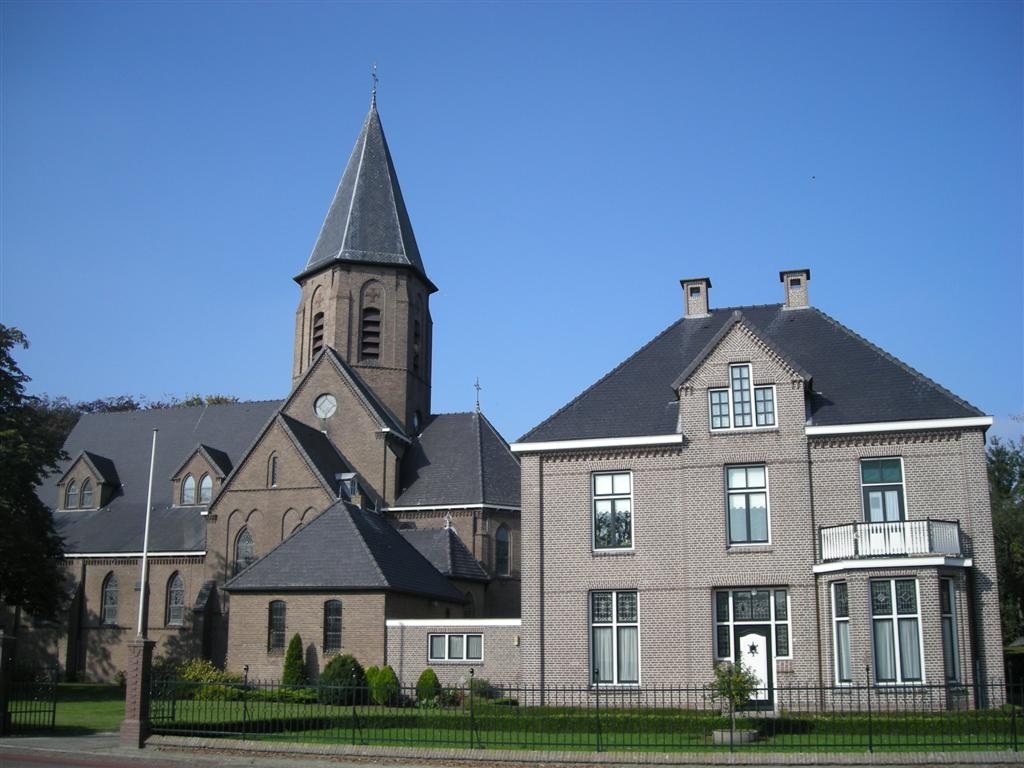
- St Frederic Church

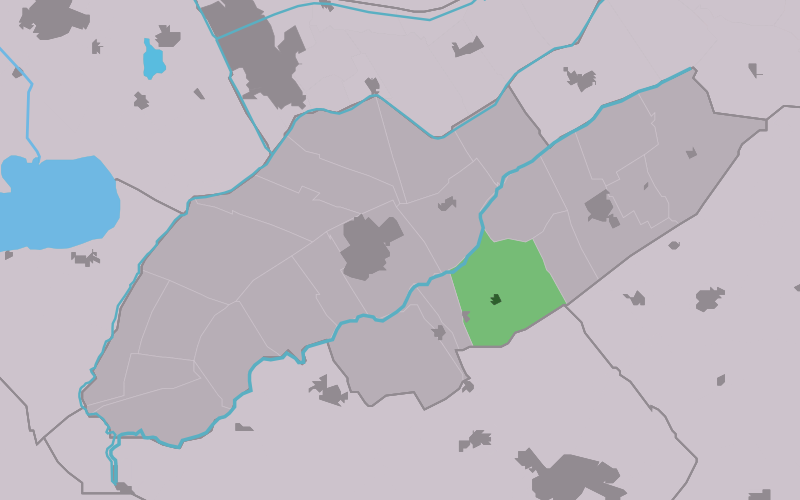
- Location in Weststellingwerf municipality

- Location in the Netherlands Steggerda (Netherlands)
- Country: Netherlands
- Province: Friesland
- Municipality: Weststellingwerf

Area
  - Total: 15.41 km^{2} (5.95 sq mi)
- Elevation: 2.3 m (7.5 ft)

Population (2021)
  - Total: 1,055
  - Density: 68.46/km^{2} (177.3/sq mi)
- Time zone: UTC+1 (CET)
  - Summer (DST): UTC+2 (CEST)
- Postal code: 8395
- Dialing code: 0561
- Website: Website

Steggerda (West Frisian: Steggerde) is a village of the Dutch municipality of Weststellingwerf. The village consists of one long stretch with housing and has a population of 1,049.

The village was first mentioned in 1408 as Steggerden. The etymology is unknown. Steggerda is a Catholic enclave in a predominantly Protestant region. In 1759, a clandestine church was built on top of a horse barn. In 1839, the first church was built which was replaced in 1921.

Steggerda was home to 560 people in 1840. In 1915, a dairy factory was opened. The factory was supposed to be demolished, however a group of villagers salvaged the steam engine. In 2011, a dairy steam museum opened.

== Notable people ==
- Mariska Rikkers, politician

== Gallery ==
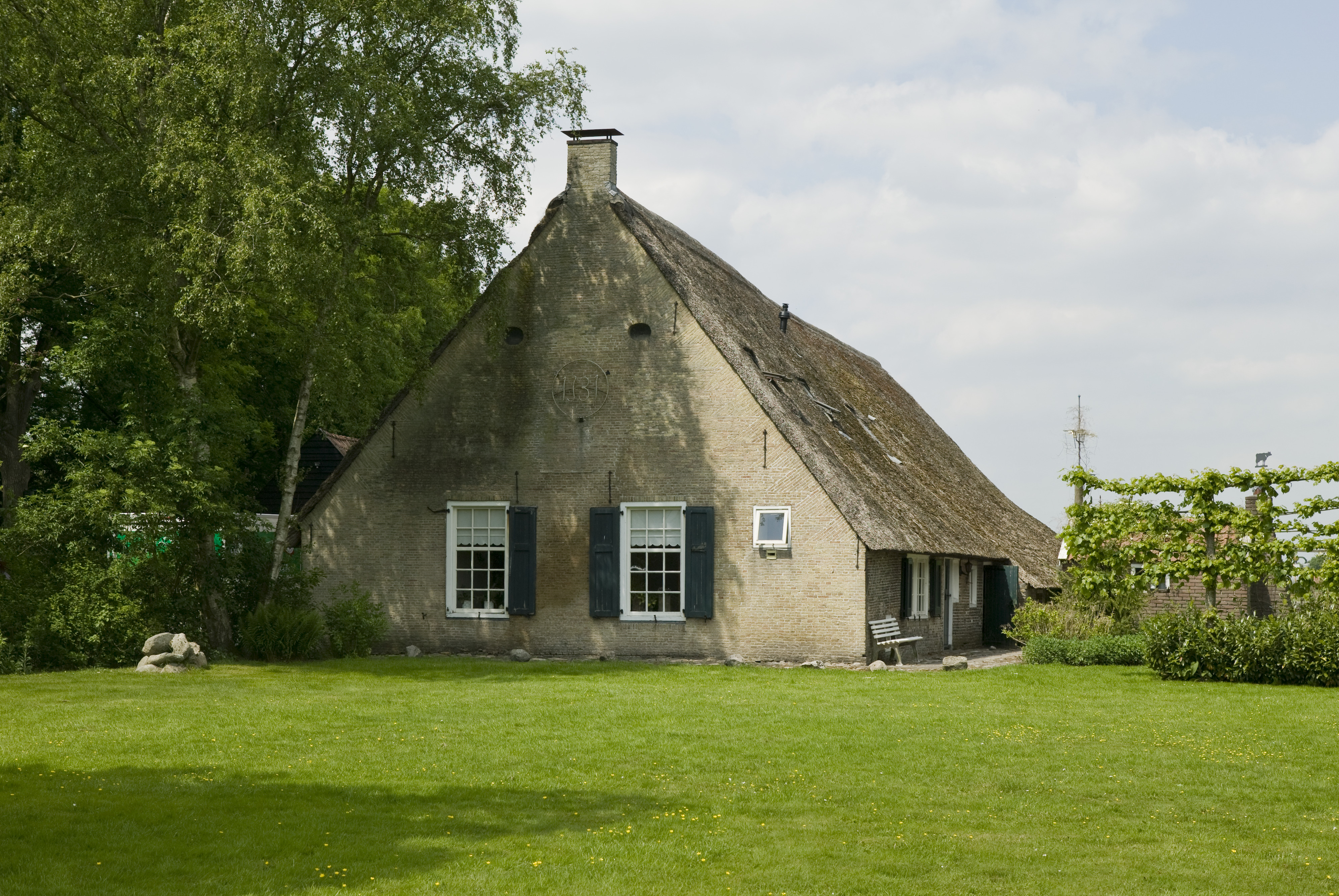
Farm in Steggerda

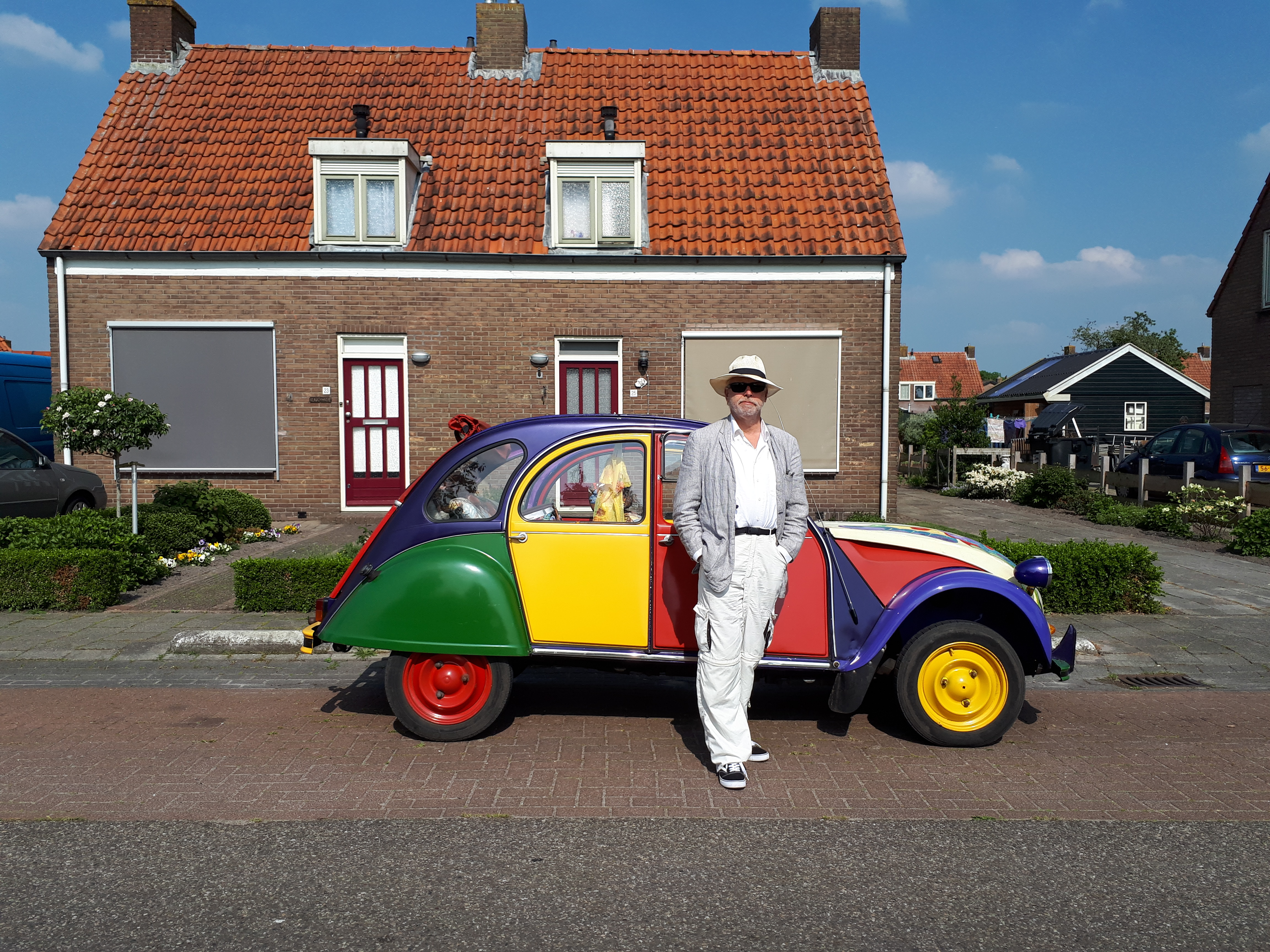
Wim Braakman in front his house of birth

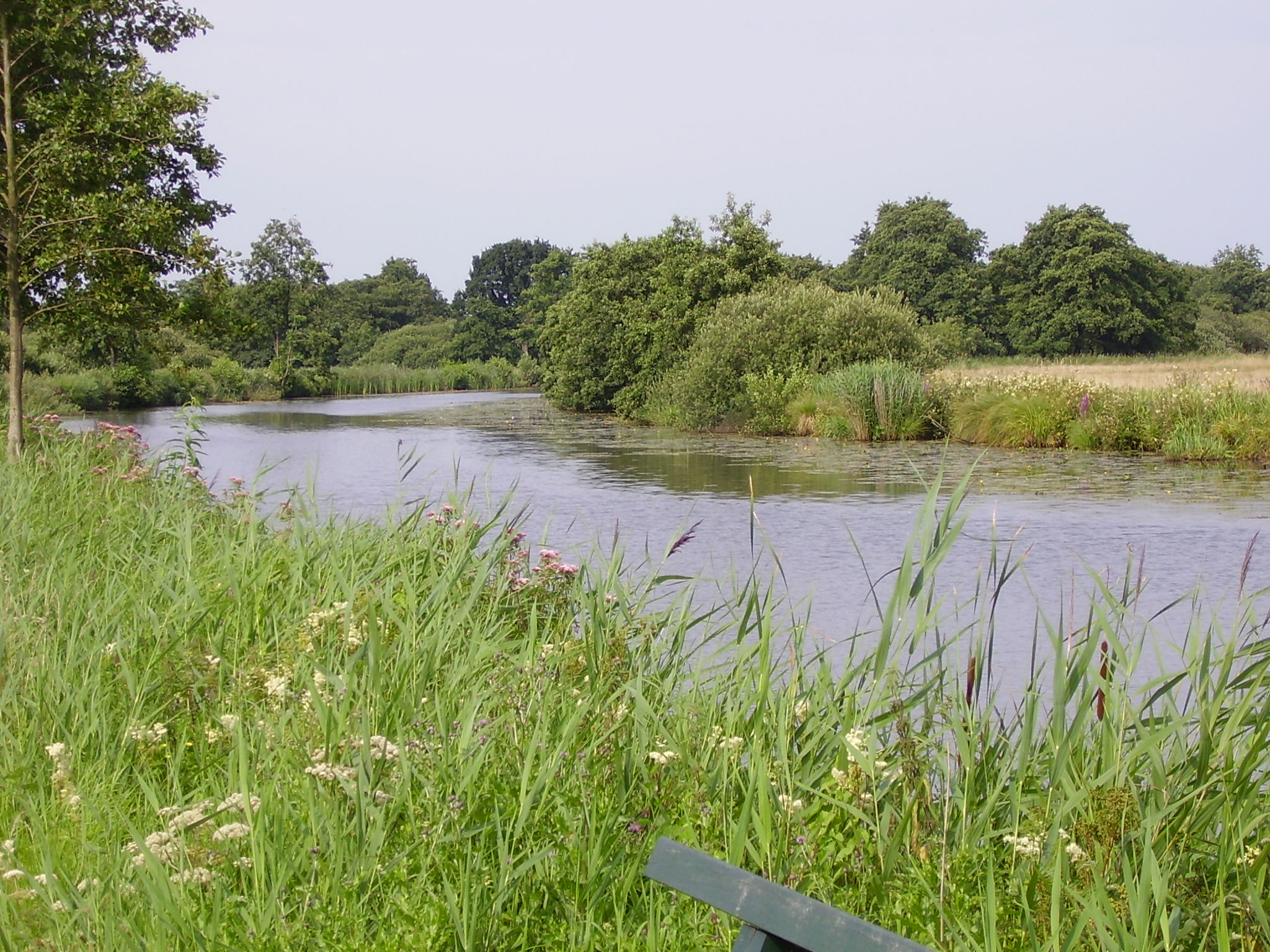
Landscape along the Linde
