= Mpanzu Bamenga =

Dutch politician (born 1985)

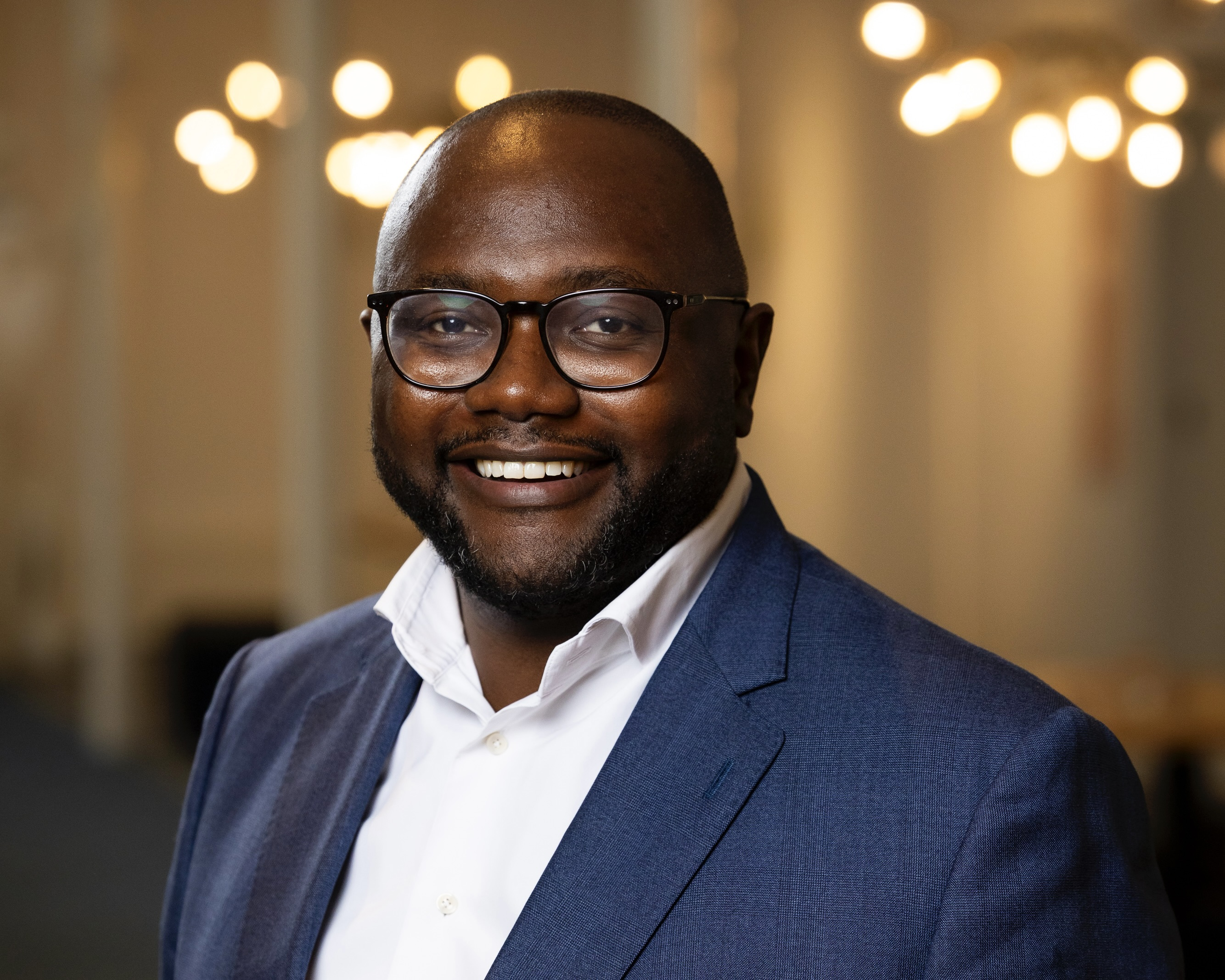
- Bamenga (2026)

Member of the House of Representatives
- Incumbent
- Assumed office 6 December 2023

Member of the Eindhoven Municipal Council
- In office 28 April 2021 – 30 March 2022
- In office 3 July 2018 – November 2018
- In office 27 March 2014 – 29 March 2018

Personal details
- Born: Panzu Bamenga; 12 July 1985 (age 41) Kinshasa, Zaire (present-day DR Congo)
- Party: Democrats 66
- Education: Radboud University (LLM)

Panzu "Mpanzu" Bamenga (born 12 July 1985) is a Congolese-born Dutch jurist, human rights activist and politician of the Democrats 66 (D66), who has served as a member of the Dutch House of Representatives since 2023. He previously held a seat in the municipal council of Eindhoven from 2014 to 2018, and from 2021 to 2022.

== Biography ==
Bamenga was born in Kinshasa, Zaire (present-day Democratic Republic of the Congo). In 1994, at the age of 8, he fled to the Netherlands with his mother and brother, where he lived as an undocumented refugee for thirteen years. He completed his pre-vocational secondary education at the Christiaan Huygens College in Eindhoven and subsequently followed an administrative-legal training secondary vocational education at the Summa College from 2001 to 2005. Bamenga subsequently obtained his bachelor's degree in law at the Avans-Fontys Law School in Tilburg University and studied European immigration and asylum law at the Université libre de Bruxelles and Dutch law at the Radboud University. In 2007, he was granted a residence permit by Justice Minister Ernst Hirsch Ballin.

In 2020, he sued the Dutch government along with human rights organizations and another citizen for racial profiling, after he had been selected for an inspection by the Royal Marechaussee at Eindhoven Airport. Bamenga was informed that the agency was looking for criminals and non-Dutch citizens, and he noted that all other selected individuals were people of color. The Hague Court of Appeal concluded that the Royal Marechaussee had engaged in racial discrimination, and it ruled that the agency was not allowed to use racial features during inspections. For his legal battle, Bamenga won an annual prize awarded by the Netherlands Institute for Human Rights in 2021.

On 22 November 2023, he ran in the 2023 general election as the ninth candidate on the D66 list, and was elected into the House of Representatives. He was installed as MP on 6 December 2023, and he became his party's spokesperson for foreign trade, development cooperation, discrimination, integration, infrastructure, and environment. Along with Willem Koops (NSC), he introduced a bill in December 2024 to explicitly prohibit racial profiling during fraud detection and criminal investigations. They argued insufficient protection against the practice existed despite the Constitution's discrimination ban and other anti-discrimination legislation.

=== House committees ===
- Committee for the Interior
- Committee for Kingdom Relations
- Committee for European Affairs
- Committee for Foreign Trade and Development
- Contact group France
- Committee for Agriculture, Fisheries, Food Security and Nature
- Committee for Infrastructure and Water Management

== Electoral history ==
Electoral history of Mpanzu Bamenga
Year	Body	Party	Pos.	Votes	Result		Ref.
Year	Body	Party	Pos.	Votes	Party seats	Individual	Ref.
2017	House of Representatives	Democrats 66	35	834	19	Lost	
2023	House of Representatives	Democrats 66	9	4,264	9	Won	
2025	House of Representatives	Democrats 66	10	9,121	26	Won	
