= Anita Pijpelink =

Dutch politician (born 1974)

Member of the House of Representatives
- In office 9 December 2023 – 11 December 2025

Personal details
- Born: 7 October 1974 (age 52) Hoek, Zeeland, Netherlands
- Party: Labour

Anita Pijpelink (born 7 October 1974) is a Dutch politician representing the Labour Party who was elected to the House of Representatives in the 2023 Dutch general election. She was formerly a member of the Provincial Council of Zeeland, and she has been a history teacher for 20 years.

Pijpelink was her party's spokesperson for primary and secondary education, and she served as vice-chair of the committee carrying out the parliamentary inquiry into the Dutch response to the COVID-19 pandemic, which commenced in February 2024. She was not re-elected in October 2025, and her term ended on 11 November.

== House committee assignments ==
- Committee for Education, Culture and Science
- Parliamentary committee of inquiry into COVID-19 (vice chair)

== Electoral history ==
Electoral history of Anita Pijpelink
Year	Body	Party	Pos.	Votes	Result		Ref.
Year	Body	Party	Pos.	Votes	Party seats	Individual	Ref.
2023	House of Representatives	GroenLinks–PvdA	22	12,340	25	Won	
2025	House of Representatives	GroenLinks–PvdA	26	11,965	20	Lost	

== See also ==
- List of members of the House of Representatives of the Netherlands, 2023–2025
