= Claudia van Zanten =

Dutch politician (born 1978)

Member of the House of Representatives
- In office 6 December 2023 – 11 November 2025

Personal details
- Born: 30 December 1978 (age 47) Leiden, Netherlands
- Party: currently none
- Other political affiliations: Farmer–Citizen Movement (August 2023-March 2026); People's Party for Freedom and Democracy (until August 2023)

Claudia van Zanten (born 30 December 1978) is a Dutch politician, currently without a party, but previously representing the Farmer–Citizen Movement (BBB). Before that, she was a member of the Amsterdam district council for the VVD. In 2023 she was in 7th place on the list of BBB candidates for the 2023 Dutch general election in which she was elected. She became her party's spokesperson for education, culture, and science, and her portfolio was expanded to include asylum, migration, social affairs, employment, antisemitism, justice, and security following the swearing in of the Schoof cabinet.

Van Zanten was on the committee carrying out the parliamentary inquiry into the Dutch response to the COVID-19 pandemic, which commenced in February 2024. She asked parliamentary questions about the journalistic integrity and neutrality of coverage of the Gaza war by public broadcaster NOS after it had described Secretary-General of Hezbollah Hassan Nasrallah as being considered a charismatic and competent leader among his supporters. Minister of Education, Culture and Science Eppo Bruins responded that the government should not interfere with media coverage in line with freedom of the press and freedom of speech.

She was not re-elected in October 2025, and her term ended on 11 November. On 28 March 2026, Van Zanten ended her membership of the BBB party.

== House committees ==
Van Zanten is on the following parliamentary committees:

- Parliamentary Committee of Inquiry on the COVID-19 pandemic
- Committee for Education, Culture and Science
- Contact group Germany
- Contact group United States
- Committee for Asylum and Migration

== Electoral history ==
Electoral history of Claudia van Zanten
Year	Body	Party	Pos.	Votes	Result		Ref.
Year	Body	Party	Pos.	Votes	Party seats	Individual	Ref.
2023	House of Representatives	Farmer–Citizen Movement	7	1,760	7 / 150	Won	
2025	House of Representatives	Farmer–Citizen Movement	5	1,199	4 / 150	Lost	
2026	Amsterdam Municipal Council	Farmer–Citizen Movement	9 (Note: Van Zanten participated as a lijstduwer.)	30	0 / 45	Lost	
