= Daan de Kort =

Dutch politician (born 1992)

Member of the House of Representatives
- Incumbent
- Assumed office 31 March 2021

Alderman in Veldhoven
- In office 14 May 2018 – 31 March 2021
- Succeeded by: Vivianne van Wieren

Member of the Veldhoven municipal council
- In office 27 March 2014 – 14 May 2018
- Succeeded by: Jos van Daele

Personal details
- Born: Adriaan Harry John de Kort; 15 July 1992 (age 34) Veldhoven, Netherlands
- Party: People's Party for Freedom and Democracy
- Education: Avans University of Applied Sciences; Leiden University

Adriaan Harry John "Daan" de Kort (born 15 July 1992) is a Dutch politician of the conservative liberal People's Party for Freedom and Democracy (VVD). Born in Veldhoven, he served on that town's municipal council starting in 2014, and he became an alderman four years later. He was elected to the House of Representatives in the 2021 Dutch general election.

De Kort is visually impaired, having lost 96% of his vision when he was fifteen years old.

== Early life and education ==
De Kort was born in the North Brabant town of Veldhoven, an Eindhoven suburb. His parents are real estate brokers, and he has a brother. De Kort attended the secondary school Sondervick College at havo level and played football at the local club Rood-Wit. He studied public administration at the Avans University of Applied Sciences in 's-Hertogenbosch between 2010 and 2015, and he subsequently did a bachelor's in the same field, graduating in 2018. While studying at Avans, he co-founded the public administration study association s.v. Collegium.

De Kort helped create the website veldhovenviertfeest.nl, which was launched in 2013 and showed activities in the Veldhoven area.

== Politics ==
=== Veldhoven ===
De Kort assisted the VVD's caucus in the Veldhoven municipal council between 2011 and 2014, and he co-founded the party's Veldhoven youth wing in 2012. He appeared sixth on the party list in the 2014 municipal election in Veldhoven. Even though the VVD won five council seats, he was elected due to having received enough preference votes. He successfully proposed that the North Brabant VVD publish its program for the 2015 provincial election in braille. De Kort became the VVD's vice caucus leader in the Veldhoven municipal council in May 2015 and succeeded Peter Saris as caucus leader in November 2016.

He was re-elected in 2018, when he was the VVD's lead candidate and when his party received a seven-seat plurality in the municipal council. De Kort helped form a new governing coalition and left the Veldhoven council to serve as an alderman of economic affairs, education, and sports in the new municipal executive. Aged 25, he became the youngest alderperson in Veldhoven's history. He managed to introduce two-hour free parking to the town's center, which was among his campaign promises. De Kort was also part of a working group of the European Blind Union, which investigated how voting could be made more accessible to visually impaired people.

=== House of Representatives ===
He ran for member of parliament in the 2021 general election, being placed 28th on the VVD's party list. De Kort was elected with 5,714 preference votes, and he was sworn into the House of Representatives on 31 March. He simultaneously stepped down as alderman.

He was the VVD's spokesperson for intergovernmental relations, local governments finances, municipal mergers, government transparency, public sector working conditions, legal status of political officeholders, and nobility – all part of the BZK ministry – and Participation Act, Wajong benefit, Anw benefit, ESF+, reintegration, social affairs and employment in the Caribbean Netherlands, SVB, and developments and support of cooperation of the SUWI chain – all part of the SZW ministry. His specialties related to the BZK ministry were later in 2021 replaced by accessibility and labor conditions, and poverty was added the following year. De Kort was the VVD's lijstduwer in Veldhoven in the 2022 municipal elections. He launched a website in October 2022 to report government websites and applications that are inaccessible to people with a disability.

Following the November 2023 general election, De Kort became the VVD's spokesperson on primary and secondary education, poverty, and labor participation. Only labor participation remained in his portfolio after the Schoof cabinet was sworn in. He chairs the committee carrying out the parliamentary inquiry into the Dutch response to the COVID-19 pandemic, which commenced in February 2024.

=== House committee assignments ===
==== 2021–2023 term ====
- Committee for Digital Affairs
- Committee for the Interior
- Committee for Kingdom Relations
- Committee for Social Affairs and Employment
- Contact group Belgium
- Delegation to the Benelux Parliament

==== 2023–present term ====
- Parliamentary committee of inquiry into COVID-19 (chair)
- Committee for Kingdom Relations
- Committee for Social Affairs and Employment
- Contact group Belgium
- Delegation to the Benelux Parliament

== Personal life ==
De Kort lives in his birth place of Veldhoven. As of 2023, he was engaged to be married.

He lost 96% of his eyesight in a few days time in March 2008, when he was fifteen years old, and he is now only able to see the contours of his immediate surroundings. The growth of one of his skull bones damaged his optic nerve. The bone was removed through surgery to prevent complete blindness. De Kort started performing as a disc jockey the following year under the stage name DJ Braille. He stopped appearing as a DJ shortly before he became an alderman. De Kort also recorded a four-episode podcast series called Eyeopener in late 2020 and early 2021 about his disability. In June 2022 – while in parliament – he started hosting the new monthly radio show De Kort in Den Haag (De Kort in The Hague) together with Theo Erkens about national politics on local station Kempen FM.

== Electoral history ==
Electoral history of Daan de Kort
Year	Body	Party	Pos.	Votes	Result		Ref.
Year	Body	Party	Pos.	Votes	Party seats	Individual	Ref.
2021	House of Representatives	People's Party for Freedom and Democracy	28	5,714	34	Won	
2023	House of Representatives	People's Party for Freedom and Democracy	24	4,472	24	Won	
2025	House of Representatives	People's Party for Freedom and Democracy	20	4,806	22	Won	
