= Mohammed Mohandis =

Moroccan-Dutch politician (born 1985)

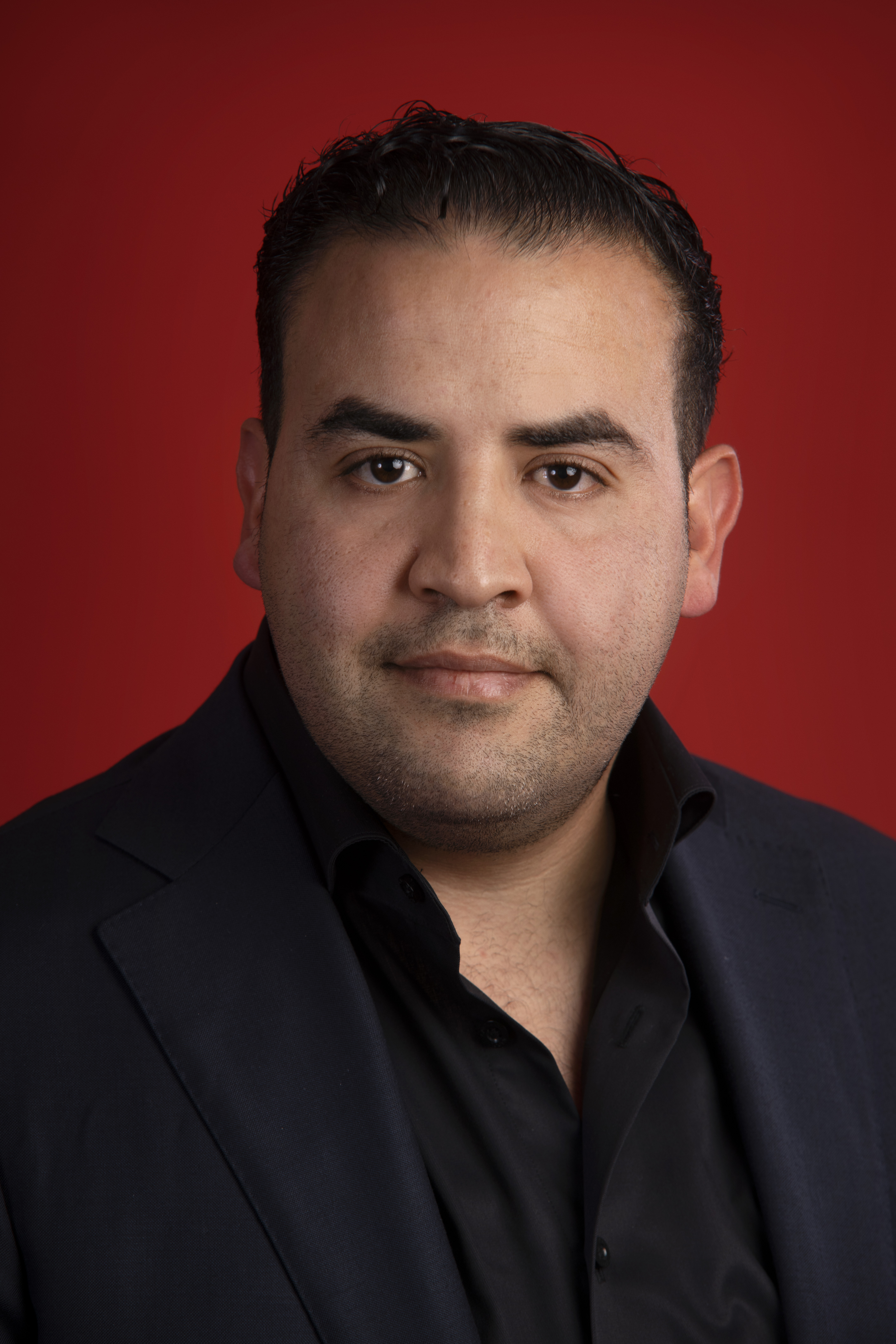
- Mohammed Mohandis in 2021

Member of the House of Representatives
- Incumbent
- Assumed office 2 June 2022
- In office 20 September 2012 – 23 March 2017

Member of the municipal council of Gouda
- In office 7 March 2006 – 20 September 2012

Personal details
- Born: 28 June 1985 (age 41) Gouda, Netherlands
- Party: Labour Party (until 2026); PRO (since 2026)

Mohammed "Mo" Mohandis (born 28 June 1985) is a Moroccan-Dutch politician of Progressief Nederland (PRO), formerly of the Labour Party (Partij van de Arbeid).

Mohandis studied communications management, and he served as chairperson of the Dutch Young Socialists. He was a member of the municipal council of Gouda from 2006 to 2012, when he was elected to the House of Representatives. His term ended after the 2017 general election. He was again appointed to the body in June 2022 due to a vacancy, and he was re-elected in 2023. He has since served as spokesperson for poverty and sports. He proposed several adjustments to the social safety net with Sandra Palmen (NSC) to simplify the system and to make it more forgiving to those in poverty.

In February 2024, a motion by Mohammed Mohandis and Michiel van Nispen (SP) was carried to reintroduce swimming lessons in elementary schools. They called on the government to prepare scenarios for their initiative in response to declining swimming skills among youths. Mohandis had completed his own swimming lessons earlier that month concurrently with his daughter.

== Electoral history ==
Electoral history of Mohammed Mohandis
Year	Body	Party	Pos.	Votes	Result		Ref.
Year	Body	Party	Pos.	Votes	Party seats	Individual	Ref.
2010	House of Representatives	Labour Party	35	4,379	30	Lost	
2012	House of Representatives	Labour Party	33	5,413	38	Won	
2017	House of Representatives	Labour Party	21	766	9	Lost	
2021	House of Representatives	Labour Party	11	1,420	9	Lost (Note: Mohandis was appointed to the body later during the term due to a vacancy.)	
2023	House of Representatives	GroenLinks–PvdA	14	3,348	25	Won	
2025	House of Representatives	GroenLinks–PvdA	13	3,466	20	Won	
