= Hilde Palland =

Dutch politician (born 1979)

Member of the House of Representatives
- In office 29 May 2019 – 5 December 2023

Personal details
- Born: Hilde Marije Mulder; 13 September 1979 (age 47) Kampen, Netherlands
- Party: Christian Democratic Appeal (2000–present)
- Education: University of Groningen
- Occupation: Entrepreneur, politician

Hilde Marije Palland-Mulder (born 13 September 1979) is a Dutch entrepreneur and former politician who served as a member of the House of Representatives from 2019 until 2023. A member of the Christian Democratic Appeal (CDA), as a parliamentarian she focused on matters related to the labour market, integration and medical-ethical policy.

== Politics ==
Palland was elected to the municipal council of Kampen, Overijssel from 2006 to 2018, where she chaired the CDA party group from 2009 onwards. In 2019, she became a member of the House of Representatives upon the resignation of former party leader Sybrand van Haersma Buma, who was appointed mayor of Leeuwarden. She was reelected in 2021, but lost her seat in 2023. She was a member of the temporary committee of the parliamentary inquiry into the COVID-19 pandemic.

She studied law at the University of Groningen.

== Personal life ==
She is married and has a daughter. She lives in Kampen.

== Decorations ==
Honours
Ribbon bar	Honour	Country	Date	Comment
	Knight of the Order of Orange-Nassau	Netherlands	5 December 2023	Member (2018)

== Electoral history ==
Electoral history of Hilde Palland
Year	Body	Party	Pos.	Votes	Result		Ref.
Year	Body	Party	Pos.	Votes	Party seats	Individual	Ref.
2017	House of Representatives	Christian Democratic Appeal	21	6,464	19	Lost (Note: Palland was appointed to the body later during the term due to a vacancy.)	
2021	House of Representatives	Christian Democratic Appeal	12	3,990	15	Won	
2023	House of Representatives	Christian Democratic Appeal	6	2,818	5	Lost	
2024	European Parliament	Christian Democratic Appeal	26 (Note: Palland participated as a lijstduwer.)	2,500	3	Lost	
