= Ria de Korte =

Dutch politician (born 1959)

Member of the House of Representatives
- In office 17 December 2024 – 11 November 2025
- Preceded by: Sandra Palmen

Member of the De Ronde Venen Municipal Council
- Incumbent
- Assumed office 27 March 2014

Personal details
- Born: Maria Christina Verhoef; 28 January 1959 (age 67) Baambrugge, Netherlands
- Party: New Social Contract (since 2023); Christian Democratic Appeal (until 2022)
- Other political affiliations: Lokaal en Fair (since 2023)
- Children: 4
- Education: Utrecht University; Vrije Universiteit Amsterdam
- Occupation: Politician; health scientist; nurse

Maria Christina "Ria" de Korte-Verhoef (Dutch: [ˈrijaː də ˈkɔrtə]; born 28 January 1959) is a Dutch politician who served as a member of the House of Representatives between December 2024 and November 2025.

A nurse and health scientist, she was a municipal councilor in De Ronde Venen from 2014 to 2024. She represented the Christian Democratic Appeal (CDA) until she co-founded the local Lokaal en Fair (LEF) party in 2023. Nationally, she has since been a member of New Social Contract (NSC).

== Early life and career ==
De Korte was born in Baambrugge, Utrecht on 28 January 1959. She was trained in nursing at VU University Medical Center (VUmc) between 1977 and 1981, and she started her career in a hospital oncology department and as a community nurse. She led a nursing department until 1996. At the same time, De Korte studied nursing education at Midden Nederland University of Applied Sciences (1988–1990) and nursing science at Utrecht University (1992–1996).

De Korte taught nursing at University Medical Center Utrecht from 1997 to 2013. She also worked as a policy adviser and program lead at organizations such as the Centres for the Development of Palliative Care, Nurses and Caregivers Netherlands, and national expertise organization Vilans. She studied epidemiology at VUmc's Institute for Research in Extramural Medicine from 2010 to 2015, and she received her doctorate from Vrije Universiteit Amsterdam in September 2014 after having completed her dissertation about palliative care titled Reasons and Avoidability of Hospitalisations at the End of Life Perspectives of GP's, Nurses and Family Carers. De Korte subsequently researched and taught nursing at Amsterdam University of Applied Sciences until 2023. She served on the supervisory board of a Christian elderly care organization headquartered in Barneveld between 2020 and 2024.

== Politics ==
De Korte ran for the Municipal Council of De Ronde Venen in a special election held in November 2010, following the amalgamation of Abcoude into the municipality. Her tenth place on the party list of the Christian Democratic Appeal (CDA) was insufficient to be elected, as the party won seven seats. It secured the same seat total in March 2014, when De Korte was elected to the council as the CDA's third candidate. She was sworn in on 27 March. Nationally, she was placed 35th on the party list in the March 2017 general election, when the CDA secured 19 seats.

She was re-elected to the De Ronde Venen Municipal Council in 2018 and 2022, both times as the CDA's third candidate. De Korte left the party in September 2022, and she co-founded the local Lokaal en Fair (LEF) party in June 2023. Besides, she joined New Social Contract (NSC) when it was established by former CDA member Pieter Omtzigt ahead of the November 2023 general election. She was placed 28th on the NSC party list in 2024, but she was not elected as the party won 20 seats. De Korte subsequently assisted the parliamentary group as policy adviser on healthcare. On 17 December 2024, she was sworn into the House of Representatives to succeed Sandra Palmen, who was appointed State Secretary for Benefits and Redress. De Korte's portfolio included medical ethics, development cooperation, and international trade. She was not re-elected in October 2025, as NSC lost all its seats, and her term ended on 11 November.

=== House committee assignments ===
- Committee for Foreign Trade and Development
- Committee for Health, Welfare and Sport

== Personal life ==
As of 2024, De Korte lived in her birth place of Baambrugge. She is married, and she has four children.

== Electoral history ==
Electoral history of Ria de Korte
| Year | Body | Party | Pos. | Votes | Result | | Ref. |
| Year | Body | Party | Pos. | Votes | Party seats | Individual | Ref. |
|---|---|---|---|---|---|---|---|
| 2010 | De Ronde Venen Municipal Council | Christian Democratic Appeal | 10 | | 7 | Lost | |
| 2014 | De Ronde Venen Municipal Council | Christian Democratic Appeal | 3 | | 7 | Won | |
| 2017 | House of Representatives | Christian Democratic Appeal | 35 | 1,505 | 19 | Lost | |
| 2018 | De Ronde Venen Municipal Council | Christian Democratic Appeal | 3 | | 6 | Won | |
| 2022 | De Ronde Venen Municipal Council | Christian Democratic Appeal | 3 | 269 | 5 | Won | |
| 2023 | House of Representatives | New Social Contract | 28 | 656 | 20 | Lost (Note: De Korte was appointed to the body later during the term due to a vacancy.) | |
| 2025 | House of Representatives | New Social Contract | 17 | 149 | 0 | Lost | |
