= Dion Huidekooper =

Dutch politician (born 1993)

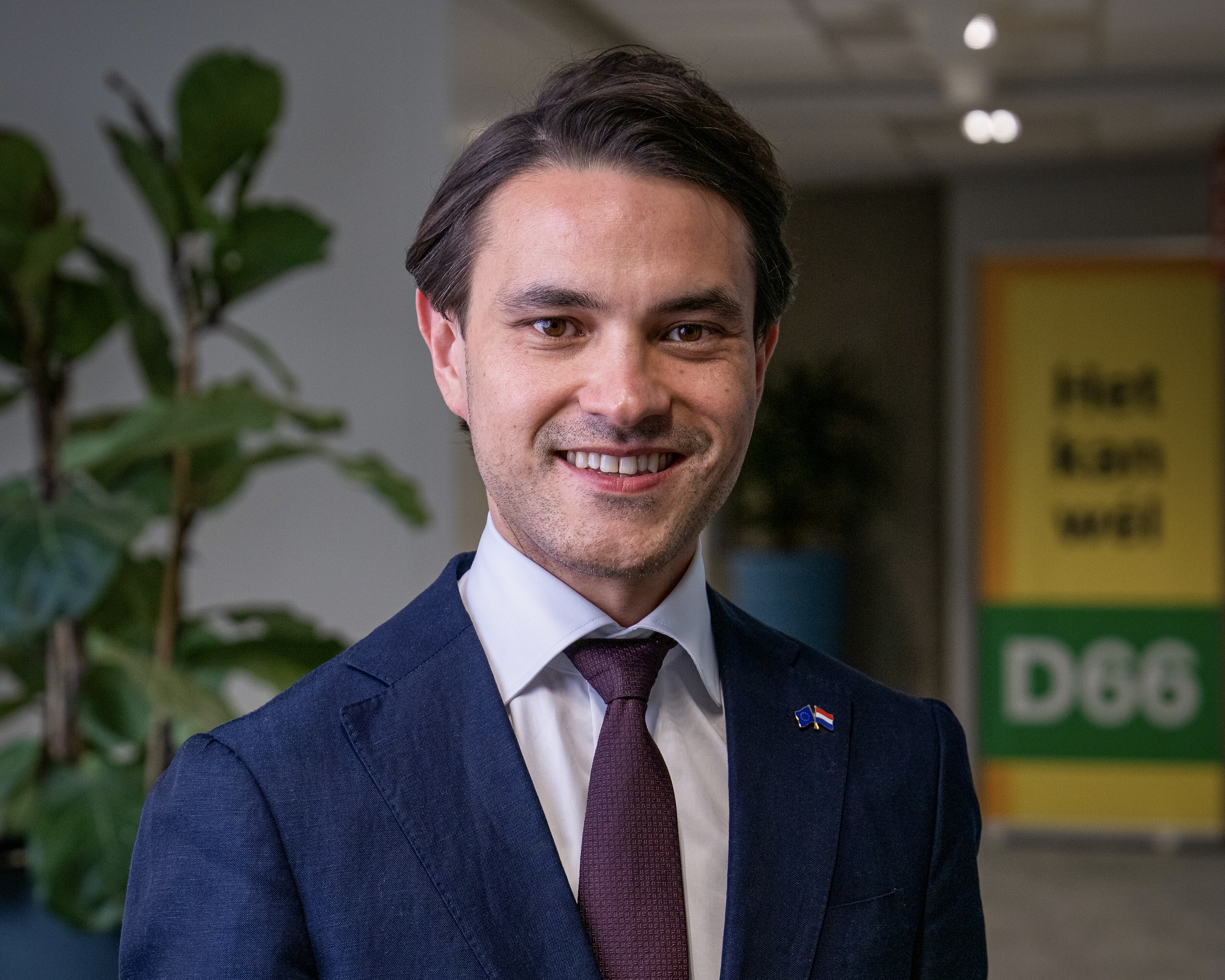
- Huidekooper (2026)

Member of the House of Representatives
- Incumbent
- Assumed office 12 November 2025

Personal details
- Born: 1993 (age 32–33)
- Party: Democrats 66

Dion Huidekooper (born 1993) is a Dutch politician who was elected member of the House of Representatives in 2025. From 2023 to 2024, he served as chairman of the Jonge Klimaatbeweging.
