= Henk-Jan Oosterhuis =

Dutch politician (born 1985)

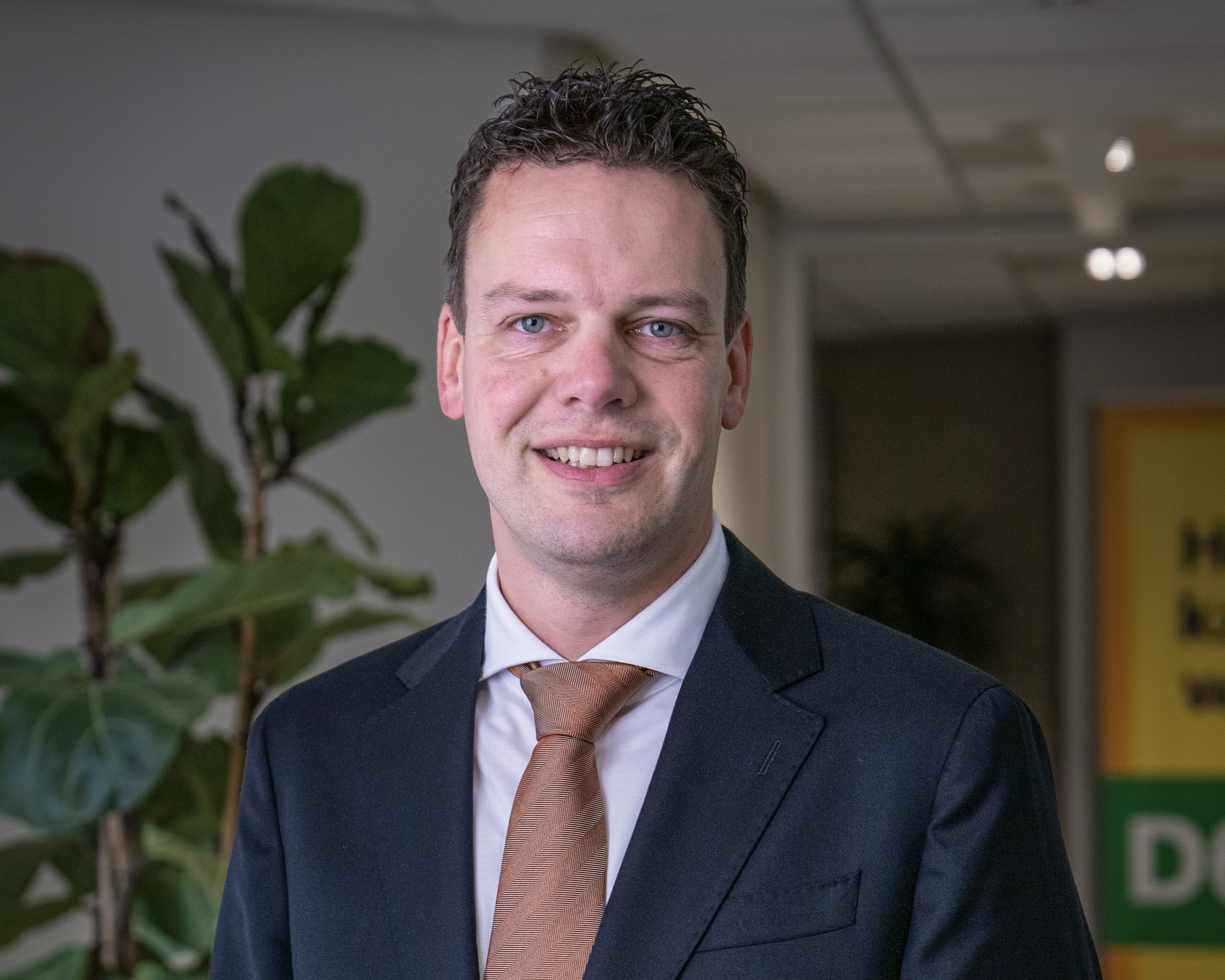
- Oosterhuis (2026)

Member of the House of Representatives
- Incumbent
- Assumed office 12 November 2025

Personal details
- Born: 18 January 1985 (age 41)
- Party: Democrats 66

Henk-Jan Oosterhuis (born 18 January 1985) is a Dutch politician who was elected member of the House of Representatives in 2025. From 2008 to 2009, he served as chairman of the Nederlands Studenten Orkest.
