= Mariska Rikkers =

Dutch politician (born 1977)

Member of the House of Representatives
- In office 4 July 2024 – 11 November 2025
- Preceded by: Mona Keijzer

Personal details
- Born: 23 June 1977 (age 49) Steggerda, Weststellingwerf, Netherlands
- Party: Farmer–Citizen Movement
- Occupation: Politician

Mariska Geertruida Fenna Rikkers-Oosterkamp (born 23 June 1977) is a Dutch politician for the Farmer–Citizen Movement, who was a member of the House of Representatives between July 2024 and November 2025. She succeeded Mona Keijzer, who had been appointed housing minister in the Schoof cabinet. Rikkers's portfolio contained social affairs, employment, healthcare, welfare, and sports.

== Career ==
Rikkers was an alderman in Weststellingwerf, and was a member of the council for Weststellingwerfs Belang.

== House committee assignments ==
- Procedure Committee
- Committee for Social Affairs and Employment
- Committee for Health, Welfare and Sport
- Contact group Germany
- Contact group United States

== Personal life ==
Rikkers is married with children.

== Electoral history ==
Electoral history of Mariska Rikkers
Year	Body	Party	Pos.	Votes	Result		Ref.
Year	Body	Party	Pos.	Votes	Party seats	Individual	Ref.
2023	House of Representatives	Farmer–Citizen Movement	10	2,656	7	Lost (Note: Rikkers was appointed to the body later during the term due to a vacancy.)	
2024	European Parliament	Farmer–Citizen Movement	18	4,127	2	Lost	

== See also ==
- List of members of the House of Representatives of the Netherlands, 2023–2025
