= Nora Achahbar =

Dutch politician and jurist (born 1982)

State Secretary for Benefits and Customs
- In office 2 July 2024 – 15 November 2024
- Prime Minister: Dick Schoof
- Minister: Eelco Heinen
- Preceded by: Aukje de Vries
- Succeeded by: Sandra Palmen

Personal details
- Born: Nora Achahbar; 21 June 1982 (age 44) Sidi Slimane, Morocco
- Citizenship: Morocco; Netherlands
- Party: NSC (2023–present)
- Children: 2
- Education: Leiden University
- Occupation: Politician; judge; lawyer; public prosecutor

Nora Achahbar (Dutch: [ˈnoːraː ˈɑɕaːbɑr]; born 21 June 1982) is a Dutch jurist, judge and politician of the New Social Contract (NSC) party. She served as State Secretary for Benefits and Customs in the Schoof cabinet between July and November 2024.

== Early life and career ==
Achahbar was born in Sidi Slimane, Morocco. Her father moved to the Netherlands as a guest worker aged 18, working as a cook in The Hague. Achahbar grew up at the edge of its Schilderswijk neighborhood, and she described her childhood in poverty in an interview to Trouw. She graduated high school with a VWO diploma and went on to study Dutch law at Leiden University. She was an intern for the parliamentary group of Democrats 66 and the Council for the Judiciary, and she subsequently worked as a judge ad hoc in a Haarlem court, a police detective in Leiden, and a lawyer. For ten years, Achahbar served as a public prosecutor in The Hague, where she dealt with cases related to fraud, terrorism, violent crime, and burglary. Simultaneously, she was a judge ad hoc specialized in administrative and criminal law in the period 2020–2021.

== State Secretary for Benefits and Customs ==
Achahbar joined the newly established political party New Social Contract, and she ran for the House of Representatives as its 26th candidate in the November 2023 general election. She did not enter the House, as the party secured 20 seats. After the PVV, VVD, NSC, and BBB formed the Schoof cabinet, Achahbar was sworn in as State Secretary for Benefits and Customs on 2 July 2024. Her portfolio includes the aftermath of the Dutch childcare benefits scandal and reforms to the benefits system. The cabinet aimed to finish the recovery operation for the scandal's victims by 2027 despite a slow pace of procedures. Achahbar criticized the myriad of compensation schemes. She established an emergency committee to advise on a new centralized recovery approach that would look beyond just financial compensation.

On 11 November 2024, when the Council of Ministers discussed the Amsterdam attacks, in which supporters of the Israeli football club Maccabi Tel Aviv F.C. were targeted, Achahbar reportedly considered some remarks offensive, radical, and potentially racist. Prime Minister Dick Schoof said after the council meeting that the events pointed to a broader integration issue, and State Secretary Jurgen Nobel stated that a significant portion of Islamic youth did not endorse Dutch norms and values. Achahbar announced on 15 November to the Council that she would resign as state secretary. Her intended resignation triggered crisis talks to prevent a cabinet collapse between the cabinet and leaders of the four coalition parties, who finally agreed that other cabinet members of NSC would stay on. In a letter, Achahbar cited "polarizing interactions during the past weeks" as the cause of her resignation, which was granted the same day. She later denied that her departure was because of racism, and she said that some remarks that circulated were incorrect. She did mention that public comments about integration issues as well as State Secretary Chris Jansen declaring that he continued to support a speech by Geert Wilders about wanting fewer Moroccan people in the Netherlands contributed to her dissatisfaction.

== Electoral history ==
Electoral history of Nora Achahbar
Year	Body	Party	Pos.	Votes	Result		Ref.
Year	Body	Party	Pos.	Votes	Party seats	Individual	Ref.
2023	House of Representatives	New Social Contract	26	1,373	20	Lost	

Political offices
Preceded by Aukje de Vries	State Secretary for Benefits and Customs; 2024	Succeeded by Sandra Palmen
