= Diederik Gommers =

Dutch Intensive Care physician (born 1964)

Diederik Gommers (born 1964) is a Dutch Intensive Care physician. He works at the Erasmus MC in Rotterdam and is chairman of the Dutch Union for Intensive Care.

== COVID-19 pandemic ==
During the COVID-19 pandemic in the Netherlands, Gommers was part of the Outbreak Management Team that instructed the government of Mark Rutte on measures required to reduce the spread of the disease COVID-19. He was also responsible for informing the Dutch House of Representatives on the current state of Intensive Care units in the Netherlands during the crisis.
