= November 2024 Amsterdam riots =

Riot in Amsterdam

- Part of anti-Palestinian racism during the Gaza war, antisemitism during the Gaza war, and violent incidents in reaction to the Gaza war
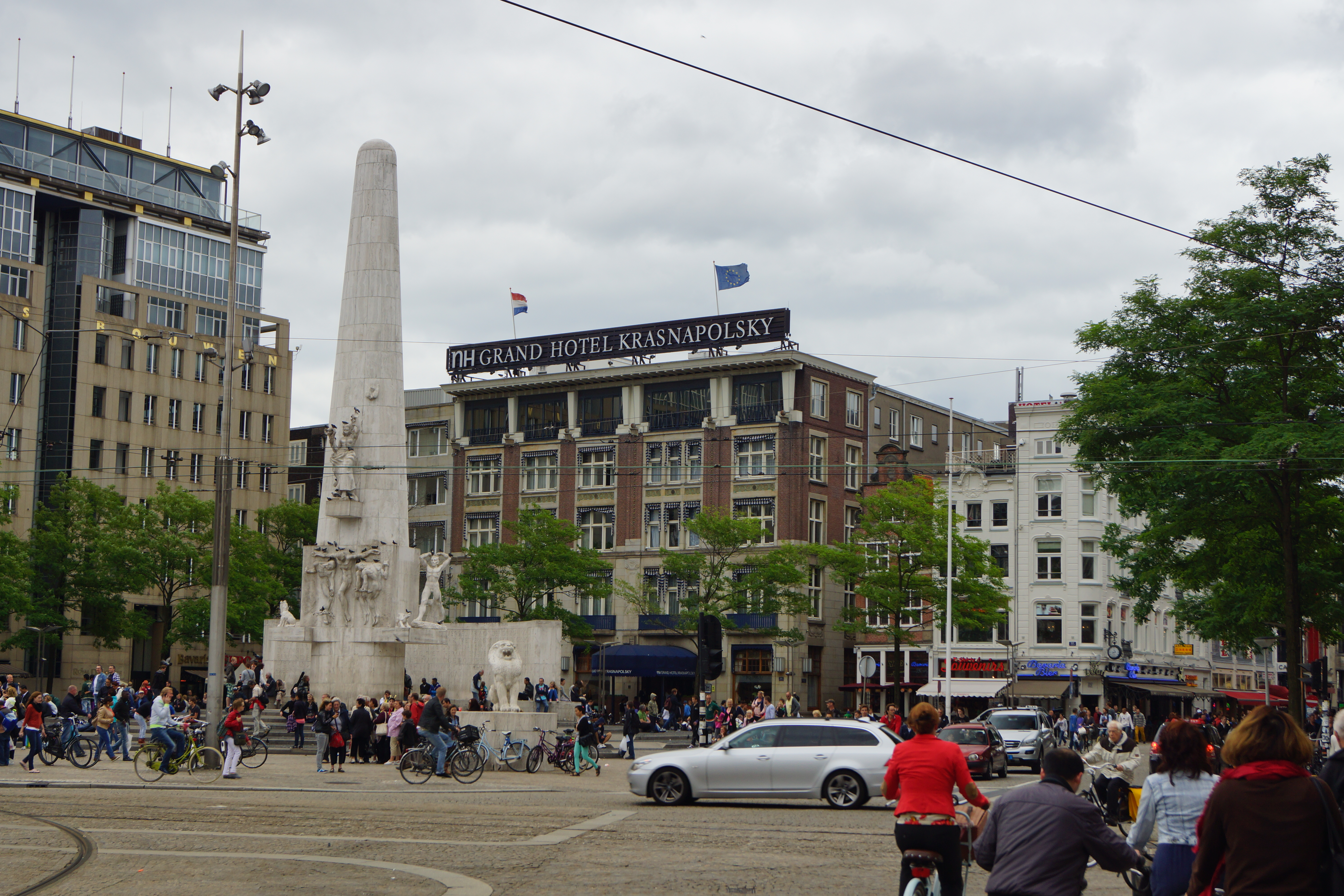
- Amsterdam's Dam Square, where some of the clashes occurred
- Date: 6–8 November 2024
- Location: Amsterdam, Netherlands
- Methods: Riots, ambush
- Result: "Emergency measures" in Amsterdam

Parties
| Fans of Maccabi Tel Aviv | Pro-Palestinian groups Amsterdam residents | National Police Corps |

Casualties
- Injuries: 7 hospitalized, 20–30 injured

On 6, 7 and 8 November 2024, before and after a UEFA Europa League football match in Amsterdam between Israeli club Maccabi Tel Aviv F.C. and Dutch club AFC Ajax, tensions over the Gaza war escalated to violence. Targets of the violence included an Arab taxi driver, Israeli Maccabi Tel Aviv fans, and pro-Palestinian protesters. Seven people, including five Israelis, were sent to hospital and 20–30 people sustained light injuries. Several local individuals who attacked Maccabi fans were given jail terms by Amsterdam district court.

The evening before the match, Maccabi Tel Aviv fans were filmed pulling Palestinian flags from houses, making racist anti-Arab chants such as "death to Arabs", assaulting people, and vandalising local property. (Note: Attributed to multiple sources:) Plans to attack Israeli fans were subsequently shared through messaging apps. After the match, Maccabi fans were ambushed and assaulted across the city centre, while a group of Maccabi fans around Damrak was recorded assaulting people and vandalising local property.

The attacks on Israeli fans were condemned as antisemitic by Amsterdam mayor Femke Halsema, Dutch prime minister Dick Schoof, King Willem-Alexander, and several international leaders. The failure to condemn the Israeli fans' attacks, and their characterisation of the events as "antisemitic", was also described as being one-sided.

The Palestinian Foreign Ministry, Palestinian Football Association, and UN Secretary-General António Guterres were among those condemning the attacks and other actions of the Israeli fans as anti-Arab and anti-Palestinian racism. Four days after the riots, Halsema published a report compiled with the chief prosecutor and chief of police which said the events were caused by a "toxic combination of antisemitism, hooliganism, and anger about the conflicts in ... the Middle East", and condemned racist violence against "all minority groups".

== Background ==
After the onset of the Gaza war on 7 October 2023, a number of protests related to the war have taken place in the Netherlands.

The Maccabi Tel Aviv fan base is known to include far-right ultra groups that have been involved in racist incidents in Israel in the past, including directing racist abuse at Arab and black players on their own team. In March 2024, prior to a game against Olympiacos F.C. in Athens, a man carrying a Palestinian flag was taken to hospital after an altercation with a group of Maccabi fans. Other European matches played by Maccabi Tel Aviv that season passed without violence, although a Men's National League game between Belgium and Israel, on 6 September 2024, had to be played behind closed doors in Hungary, after the Royal Belgian Football Association had declined to host the match due to security concerns.

=== Prelude ===
The match between Ajax and Maccabi Tel Aviv was a Europa League group stage match held at the Johan Cruyff Arena. Ahead of the game, Amsterdam mayor Femke Halsema prohibited pro-Palestinian protests near the stadium due to concerns over possible violence. Halsema requested an additional threat assessment from the National Coordinator for Counterterrorism and Security (NCTV), noting increased tensions due to the Gaza war and the upcoming commemoration of the Kristallnacht, but the NCTV found no specific threats. Mossad agents joined the football team on their trip to "provide maximum protection", and Amsterdam increased its police presence in the city centre the night before the match.

After the event, Israel claimed that it had warned the Dutch government of a potential threat to Israelis and Jews in the Netherlands, but the Netherlands denied this. The match was not initially flagged as high-risk, as Ajax is traditionally associated with Judaism, but the municipality nevertheless decided to treat it as such. Local authorities cited concerns over the potential for conflict in various areas, as "distressing" incidents targeting minorities—including Jews, Muslims and Palestinians specifically—had occurred before. A pro-Palestinian protester, who had called for a boycott of Maccabi Tel Aviv to match the boycott of Russian teams, had been attacked by Ajax supporters near Central Station on 2 November 2024.

== Riots ==
=== 6 November ===
Tensions rose on the evening of 6 November, when 200 Maccabi supporters walked through the city centre and taxi drivers shouted "free Palestine" when passing them. There were also reports of Maccabi supporters shouting "fuck you Palestine".

A group of Maccabi Fanatics chased two men, beating one with a belt as he tried to escape in a taxi. After the police arrived, the group ran away, joining other Maccabi ultras, nearly all of whom wore black clothing instead of team colours, walking towards Rokin. This group of around 50 Maccabi supporters gathered in front of Villa Mokum, a squat where several Palestinian flags were displayed.

Residents of the squat barricaded themselves inside while one of the ultras ripped the flags off. Maccabi fans reportedly kicked the doors and tried to enter the house, threatening to kill the residents. Video footage showed a police car passing without stopping, leading to criticism on social media. A group of supporters vandalised a nearby taxi, including hitting the window with an object and trying to force the windows and doors open, while the driver was inside.

Around 1.20am, the police saw online calls urging taxi drivers to mobilize. A large proportion of the taxi drivers had an Arab background and were pro-Palestinian. They gathered in various locations to find Maccabi fans.

Around 200 Israelis gathered in Holland Casino; two fans arrived bloodied. After their location was shared by a security guard, dozens of taxi drivers and scooters arrived at the casino. 15–20 Maccabi supporters were chased inside. They were escorted out by police around closing time (3am).

A Maccabi supporter was also chased into the canal around 3.15am and forced to yell "Free Palestine", while people on the quay shouted Kankerjood ("cancer Jew"). Around the same time, two Israeli men were beaten and their phones and passports stolen by a group of men arriving by taxi near Stopera. Around 4.00am, it was relatively calm in the city.

After the incidents on Wednesday night and throughout Thursday, calls for attacks on Israeli supporters were shared via Telegram, Snapchat, and WhatsApp. At least one chat referred to it as a "Jew hunt".

=== 7 November: before the match ===
City officials met at 11am to discuss whether to cancel the game due to the "aggression shown by Maccabi supporters and the reaction of the taxi drivers". They decided to let the game proceed, opening the stadium earlier than planned to allow Israeli fans to clear the streets sooner, and asking the football clubs and taxi companies to avoid politics and maintain the peace.

Maccabi Fanatics convened in the city centre at 1pm, in particular around Dam Square, displaying banners for Israeli soldiers and setting off flares. They chanted, among other things, "Fuck the Arabs". Counterdemonstrators chanted anti-Israeli slogans. Police instructed individuals displaying pro-Palestinian symbols or chanting slogans like "Free Palestine" to leave the square.

At around 5pm, the Maccabi ultras moved towards the stadium for the 9pm kickoff, leading to fights in side streets and in Station Square. On their way to the match, Israeli fans chanted "Olé olé olé, let the IDF win and fuck the Arabs", and: "Why is there no school in Gaza? There are no children left there." At the stadium, a group of Maccabi fans interrupted a minute of silence for the victims of the 2024 Spanish floods with anti-Palestinian chanting and whistles.

That afternoon, pro-Palestinian demonstrators held a demonstration at Anton de Komplein, about a kilometer from the football stadium. Some protesters attempted to move closer to the stadium, despite the protest ban, while a group of Ajax hooligans attempted to approach the protesters. The police prevented the groups from reaching each other. The commemoration of the Kristallnacht in the city centre proceeded without disruptions.

=== 7-8 November: after the match ===
After the game, which Ajax won 5-0, Maccabi supporters moved to the city centre. They were allowed to leave at the same time as the Ajax supporters so that they would blend in. A large group of supporters were escorted to the metro by police without major incident, although the Israeli fans were filmed singing anti-Arab songs.

The police were monitoring online groups, who discussed how and where to attack the Maccabi fans. According to the Dutch Inspection for Justice and Security, the first disturbances take place around the Dam at 11.30pm. Walking from Station Square to Damrak and Spui, Maccabi rioters armed themselves with wooden boards and pipes from a construction site, before being filmed chasing a group of men and beating one. According to the Dutch Inspection for Justice and Security, around midnight small groups of pro-Palestinian rioters started actively seeking out individuals they perceive as Jewish, regardless of their actual background.

The first 'flash'-attacks took place around 11.55pm at Damrak and reports in other places came in afterwards. The police had a hard time addressing these scattered and agile flash attacks. Footage showed fans being beaten and chased with knives. Eyewitnesses reported attempted stabbings, individuals being thrown into a canal, and attackers beating and spitting on Israelis. One man was kicked repeatedly while apparently unconscious in the street. Footage showed a group of men being chased down a street in the city centre and being struck by someone out of shot; one man on the ground repeatedly shouted: "I'm not Jewish!"

Meanwhile, chanting Maccabi supporters kicked the front door of a woman with a pro-Palestinian poster in her window.

The police changed strategy around 00.25am, shifting from arresting the rioters to protecting the Maccabi fans. These were directed to protected zones, from where they were moved by bus to their hotels, which was completed by around 3.00am. From 01.24am, the number of reports of trouble declined. While the situation remained restless, it was becoming manageable for the police.

Most of the people involved in the attacks on Maccabi fans were taxi drivers and youths on scooters, who believed there were ex-IDF soldiers and Mossad agents amongst them.

=== Further unrest ===
In the nights following the attacks, people thought to be Jewish continued to be targeted, including being forced out of taxis and ordered to show their passports to check if they were Israeli. On 11 November, four days after the attacks, Amsterdam police made multiple arrests after clashes in Amsterdam's '40–'45 Square between dozens of rioters and officers. One person was filmed shouting "cancer Jews", and an empty tram was damaged by fireworks. Amsterdam police said it was not clear there was a direct connection to the previous week's unrest, and some arrests were made separately from the tram incident.

== Aftermath ==
Seven people were hospitalised and eventually released, while approximately 20 to 30 others sustained minor injuries.

Amsterdam officials issued an emergency ordinance banning any demonstrations for three days after the overnight attacks, and giving Dutch police the authority to stop and search individuals. Police were also stationed in larger numbers at Jewish institutions across the city. A bomb threat on a synagogue turned out to be false, and calls to attack mosques circulated online. The ordinance was extended for four more days on 10 November. The organisations Erev Rav, an anti-Zionist group, and the Stop Racism and Fascism Platform cancelled a local Kristallnacht commemoration due to the actions of the Maccabi supporters, saying they had no confidence in the authorities to guarantee the safety of the event.

On 13 November 2024, pro-Palestinian protesters who had assembled in Dam Square despite the protesting ban were filmed apparently being attacked by police. Mayor Halsema said a high priority investigation by the police and the prosecution service had been launched into the incident and whether the violence was "in accordance with official instructions". Halsema ended the protest ban on 14 November 2024, saying that enforcing it had become "untenable".

In preparation for the 2024–25 UEFA Nations League match on 14 November between France and Israel at Stade de France near Paris, French authorities mobilised over 4,000 law enforcement officers throughout the city with RAID escorting the Israeli team and their fans. Security checks near the stadium were also increased and political messages and Palestinian flags were banned in the stadium. Despite this, some Israeli officials urged fans not to attend for their safety.

The Turkish government decided that the 28 November 2024 UEFA Europa League match against Beşiktaş would be played in a neutral country due to the possibility of supporter violence. The match was played in the empty Debreceni VSC stadium in Hungary. Hungary had already hosted several Israel national football team home games during the Gaza war.

=== Legal ===
As of March 2025, Amsterdam police have a total of 122 suspects, including around 10 Maccabi fans, although many remain unidentified. 16 people have been convicted of offences such as public violence, sharing information in chats to aid violence, and downplaying the Holocaust.

The Hind Rajab Foundation submitted a criminal complaint against Maccabi Tel Aviv supporters to the Amsterdam Public Prosecutor’s Office for incitement to hatred, genocidal rhetoric, assault, and vandalism.

=== Media reporting ===
The UK's Sky News and Israel's Channel 12 were criticised for editing reports and deleting social media posts referencing the anti-Arab behaviour of Israeli fans. Sky News removed references to Maccabi Tel Aviv fans tearing down a flag, even though the three men on video could be heard speaking Hebrew, and deleted a reference to Maccabi fans attacking locals. Channel 12 deleted a post about Maccabi Tel Aviv fans tearing down a Palestinian flag and having altercations with Muslim taxi drivers after the network faced backlash, including from Israeli prime minister Benjamin Netanyahu's son Yair, who asked: "Whose side is Channel 12 on?" on his Telegram channel.

Dutch photographer Annet de Graaf filmed Maccabi supporters attacking Amsterdammers, but many media outlets initially misreported that the video showed an "antisemitic" mob beating Israelis. The New York Times attributed this to an error made by Reuters, who syndicated the footage. Several media outlets issued a correction or clarification, including The Guardian, The New York Times, the BBC, DW, and Tagesschau.

The Electronic Intifada reported that the New York Times had cancelled a visual investigation by one of its Dutch reporters to reconstruct the moment-by-moment chronology of events in Amsterdam. In an email sent to senior Times editor Charlie Stadtlander, which was accidentally sent to Electronic Intifada, reporter Christiaan Triebert complained about the cancellation of the investigation and said that the U.S. newspaper's coverage had distorted events, such as the Israeli attacks against locals filmed by De Graaf. Triebert also voiced frustration that the video was removed after the Times issued its correction, when it could have been used to illustrate the actions of Israeli fans.

Guardian columnist Owen Jones criticised media coverage of the events for failing to cover the Israeli supporters' behaviour in the run-up to the clashes, saying, "if you condemn racist fanatics literally relishing in the mass slaughter of children, then you will be branded a hateful bigot". Marc Owen Jones, a disinformation expert and associate professor at Hamad Bin Khalifa University in Qatar, said that media outlets from The New York Times to the BBC had given a "ridiculously skewed" version of events and "uncritically embraced what looked like an Israeli government press release".

== Response ==
=== Netherlands ===
The attacks were condemned by Dutch authorities, who described them as antisemitic. Some Israeli and Dutch authors also described the incident as a pogrom.

Dutch Prime Minister Dick Schoof said he was "horrified" by the "antisemitic attacks" on Israelis, and that the country had "failed" its Jewish community. He said the attackers would be found and prosecuted, and cancelled his attendance at the 2024 United Nations Climate Change Conference in Azerbaijan to monitor the response to the unrest. Schoof also criticised comparisons between the actions of the Israeli fans and the attacks on Israeli fans that followed. He said Israeli fans' actions would also be investigated, but added: "There is nothing, absolutely nothing to serve as an excuse for the deliberate search and hunting down of Jews." VVD leader Dilan Yeşilgöz described the images as "incredibly sick" and the attacks as "pure Jew-hatred." King Willem-Alexander of the Netherlands expressed "deep horror and shock" at the attacks, adding: "We failed the Jewish community of the Netherlands during World War II, and last night we failed again."

The responses of some far-right politicians, such as Geert Wilders, were criticised for weaponizing the incident against "Moroccans" and "multicultural scum", including calls to report those convicted of the attacks. On 15 November 2024, Nora Achahbar, the State Secretary for Benefits and Customs resigned from the cabinet, citing polarising comments by politicians both in the cabinet and to the public. This almost led to the collapse of the country's four-party governing coalition. On 19 November 2024, in response to the riots, the Dutch House of Representatives passed a motion brought by Wilders, Caroline van der Plas, and Claudia van Zanten that called on the government to "close Salafist mosques and institutions that promote the destruction of the Jewish people and Israel". The motion said a rise in antisemitism and incitement had contributed to a "Jew-hunt" in the country.

The Forward, a Jewish American newspaper, reported that many in the Netherlands' small Jewish community were worried about their own safety, as they were "treated like representatives of Israel". In a viral Instagram post, Jelle Zijlstra, a Jewish community organizer in Amsterdam, called for nuance as she condemned both the "antisemitic" attacks and the Maccabi "hooligans". A rabbinical student in Amsterdam said: "We don't know that the people who got attacked last night were those same people who chanted racist chants. There is real evidence that people went 'Jew hunting.'" In the aftermath of the attacks, some Dutch Jews said the attacks left them feeling unsafe in the Netherlands, prompting some to emigrate to Israel.

==== Amsterdam ====
Amsterdam mayor Femke Halsema initially described the attackers as "antisemitic hit-and-run squads" and said the incident reminded her of pogroms against Jews in Europe. Halsema later said she regretted her use of the word "pogrom" and condemned the weaponisation of the word to attack Dutch Muslims and Moroccans. She criticised Israeli and Dutch politicians for framing the violence as targeted attacks on Israelis by local Moroccans and Palestinians. She also said the first reports had not revealed the Maccabi Tel Aviv supporters' violent behavior in Amsterdam. Jazie Veldhuyzen, an Amsterdam councillor for the left-wing De Vonk, said "Maccabi hooligans" initiated the violence when they attacked local homes, and that the city and the right-wing government were exploiting the incidents to persecute migrants.

Four days after the events, the mayor's office published a report written with Chief Prosecutor René de Beukelaer and Police Chief Peter Holla which condemned violence against minority groups in the city, and said it would conduct an independent inquiry into the riots. It said the events were caused by a "toxic combination of antisemitism, hooliganism, and anger about the conflicts in Palestine and Israel, and other countries in the Middle East".

=== Israel ===
Israeli president Isaac Herzog called the events an "anti-Semitic pogrom" and a warning to any nation that values freedom, but expressed confidence in the Dutch authorities' ability to protect Israelis and Jews. Israeli foreign minister Gideon Sa'ar advised Israelis in Amsterdam to stay in their hotels, and reached out to his Dutch counterpart, Caspar Veldkamp, for assistance in transporting Israeli citizens safely to the airport. Sa'ar described the events as "barbaric and antisemitic," and "a blaring alarm call for Europe and the world".

In a call with Dutch PM Schoof, Israeli prime minister Benjamin Netanyahu emphasized the seriousness of the attacks and requested heightened security for Israelis and Dutch Jews. He also compared the attacks to the Kristallnacht, noting the attacks took place on its 86th anniversary. Yad Vashem also noted the anniversary, saying the events showed an "alarming resurgence of antisemitism". Netanyahu arranged for El Al, Israel's flag carrier, to run eight free rescue flights from Amsterdam to Tel Aviv, transporting 2,000 Israelis.

Some Israeli journalists were critical of the media coverage of the event. Israeli-American journalist Mairav Zonszein of the International Crisis Group said it was "absurd" to compare the violence in Amsterdam to the pogroms in Russia. Israeli journalist Gideon Levy contrasted the Amsterdam attacks with the "daily pogroms in the West Bank" against Palestinians and the war in Gaza.

=== Palestine ===
The Palestinian Foreign Ministry issued a statement rejecting all forms of violence and condemning anti-Arab racism and the desecration of the Palestinian flag by Maccabi supporters. The ministry expressed concern over the three days of "violent acts" in the capital carried out by fans known for their "racist tendencies". The ministry called on the Dutch government to investigate those responsible for the unrest and to ensure the protection of Palestinians and Arabs, saying it was concerned Israeli settlers and soldiers were spreading "racist notions" across European cities. The ministry said the growing influence of these groups was a "direct attack on Palestinian identity and symbols". Tayseer Nasrallah, part of Fatah's internal parliamentary body, said the attacks were "proof that the world is sick of the Jews".

The Palestinian Football Association said they were "gravely concerned" about the incident, and condemned the anti-Palestinian racism and Islamophobia expressed by Maccabi Tel Aviv fans. It also said it had "presented FIFA with extensive evidence of such hateful expressions, yet concrete action remains lacking". According to France 24, no European leader condemned the racist anti-Arab chants or the violent actions carried out by the Israeli supporters.

Hamas senior spokesperson Sami Abu Zuhri said the Amsterdam unrest was a spontaneous response to Israel's actions in Gaza. He said the events illustrate the public reaction to the ongoing Gaza genocide, and that ending the violence in Gaza was essential for upholding human rights and supporting both regional and global security.

== Sources ==
- Inspectie Justitie en Veiligheid (16 June 2025). "Tussen voorzien en onvoorzien - politie in een complexe werkelijkheid" (PDF) (in Dutch).
