= Jos Silvis =

Dutch law professor and judge (born 1953)

Attorney General of the Supreme Court of the Netherlands
- Incumbent
- Assumed office 1 September 2016
- Preceded by: Jan Watse Fokkens

Judge of the European Court of Human Rights
- In office 1 November 2012 – 1 September 2016
- Preceded by: Egbert Myjer

Personal details
- Born: 14 November 1953 (age 72) Winschoten, Netherlands
- Education: Erasmus University Rotterdam

Johannes "Jos" Silvis (born 14 November 1953) is a Dutch law professor and judge. He was a judge at the European Court of Human Rights from 1 November 2012 through 1 September 2016. He subsequently became attorney general at the Supreme Court of the Netherlands.

== Biography ==
Silvis was born in 1953 in Winschoten. He obtained a bachelor's degree in law from Erasmus University Rotterdam in 1977. By 1979, he had obtained a master's degree in penal and constitutional law. Between 1980 and 1993 he was a lecturer at the faculty of law of Utrecht University.

Between 1994 and 2001 Silvis was judge and later vice-president of the court of Rotterdam. In 2001, he moved to the High Court of Appeal in The Hague, where he served until 2010 with a two-year hiatus between 2003 and 2005 as judge and vice-president. During his hiatus he worked for the Committee on Criminal Procedure and Legislation of the Dutch Ministry of Justice. He was Advocate-General to the Supreme Court of the Netherlands between 2010 and 2012.

== European Court of Human Rights ==
On 26 June 2012 a vote was held by the Parliamentary Assembly of the Council of Europe on the new judge to the European Court of Human Rights. Silvis was one of the three nominees, the others being Taru Spronken and Adriana van Dooijeweert. In the first round of voting Silvis obtained 61 votes, Spronken 85 and Van Dooijeweert 58. As no candidate reached the required majority of 103 votes a second round of voting was held on 27 June. A relative majority was enough to be elected this time, Silvis obtained 59 votes, Spronken 57 and Van Dooijeweert 38. Hereby Silvis was elected. On 1 November 2012 he succeeded Egbert Myjer.

The election of Silvis to the court was criticized by fellow Dutch jurists as Silvis was the presiding judge on the Schiedammer parkmoord, one of the largest miscarriages of justice in Dutch history.

Silvis resigned per 1 September 2016 to become attorney general at the Supreme Court of the Netherlands, he succeeded Jan Watse Fokkens.
