= List of parliamentary defections in the Netherlands =

Although Members of Parliament in the Netherlands are elected on a party list, they can defect from their parliamentary group and create or join another.

This excludes elected parliamentary groups merging, such as GroenLinks and Labour Party merging into GroenLinks-PvdA.

== House of Representatives ==
List of defections in the House of Representatives
MP	Parliamentary group		Period		Associated party (Note: Political party associated with the new parliamentary group)	Ref.
MP	Former (Note: The party the MP was elected for)	New	Begin date	End date	Associated party	Ref.
Jacques Aarden	KVP	Aarden	27 February 1968	9 May 1971	PPR	
Liesbeth van Aiking-van Wageningen	AOV	Nijpels	6 September 1995	18 May 1998	S2000	
Gerard van As	LPF	Nawijn	17 August 2006	12 September 2006		
Jhim van Bemmel	PVV	Van Bemmel	6 July 2012	19 September 2012		
Louis Bontes	PVV	Bontes	29 October 2013	14 April 2014		
Louis Bontes	PVV	Bontes/Van Klaveren	25 April 2014	22 March 2017	VNL	
Johan van de Brake	BP	Harmsen	27 June 1968	9 May 1971	BR	
Bertus Brandsen	CPN	Gortzak	14 April 1958	19 March 1959	SWP	
Hero Brinkman	PVV	Brinkman	20 March 2012	19 September 2012	OBP/DPK	
René Claassen	PVV	Markuszower	20 January 2026		DNA	
Stef Dijkman	CDA	Scholten/Dijkman	8 December 1983	17 April 1985		
Stef Dijkman	CDA	PPR	18 April 1985	2 June 1986		
Jan Duijs	SDAP	Duijs	29 November 1935	8 June 1937	NVP	
Cor Eberhard	LPF	De Jong	3 October 2002	29 January 2003	Cons.	
Joost Eerdmans	LPF	Eerdmans/Van Schijndel	25 September 2006	28 November 2006	One NL	
Olaf Ephraim	FvD	Van Haga	13 May 2021	4 September 2023	BVNL	
Olaf Ephraim	FvD	Ephraim	5 September 2023	5 December 2023		
Derk-Jan Eppink	JA21	BBB	1 September 2023	5 December 2023		
Frans Goedhart	PvdA	Goedhart	14 May 1970	9 May 1971	DS'70	
Henk Gortzak	CPN	Gortzak	14 April 1958	19 March 1959	SWP	
Henri van Groenendael	AB	Van Groenendael	1 October 1919	23 June 1922	NVP	
Nilüfer Gündoğan	Volt	Gündoğan	26 February 2022	8 March 2022		
Nilüfer Gündoğan	Volt	Gündoğan	22 March 2022	5 December 2023		
Liane den Haan	50+	Den Haan	6 May 2021	5 December 2023	GOUD	
Wybren van Haga	VVD	Van Haga	24 September 2019	30 November 2020		
Wybren van Haga	VVD	FvD	1 December 2020	30 March 2021 (Note: Continued after the election as elected member for the new parliamentary group)		
Wybren van Haga	FvD	Van Haga	13 May 2021	5 December 2023	BVNL	
Evert Harmsen	BP	Harmsen	27 June 1968	9 May 1971	BR	
Wouter van Harselaar	BP	Harmsen	27 June 1968	9 May 1971	BR	
Lilian Helder	PVV	BBB	1 September 2023	5 December 2023		
Theo Hendriks	AOV	Hendriks	11 October 1994	18 May 1998		
Marcial Hernandez	PVV	Kortenoeven/Hernandez	3 July 2012	18 September 2012		
Hidde Heutink	PVV	Markuszower	20 January 2026		DNA	
Johan Houwers	VVD	Houwers	25 March 2015	22 March 2017		
Tamara ten Hove	PVV	Markuszower	20 January 2026		DNA	
Coos Huijsen	CHU	Huijsen	30 March 1976	7 June 1977		
Paul Janssen	KVP	Aarden	27 February 1968	9 May 1971	PPR	
Hans Janmaat	CP	Janmaat	1 November 1984	2 June 1986	CD	
Jacques de Jong	NMP	De Jong	13 September 1971	6 December 1972	DMP	
Winny de Jong	LPF	De Jong	3 October 2002	29 January 2003	Cons.	
Agnes Joseph	NSC	BBB	15 August 2025	11 November 2025		
Mona Keijzer	BBB	Keijzer	23 February 2026			
Annie Kessel	KVP	Aarden	26 March 1968	9 May 1971	PPR	
Joram van Klaveren	PVV	Bontes/Van Klaveren	21 March 2014	22 March 2017	VNL	
Norbert Klein	50+	Klein (Note: Also known as 50PLUS/Klein before 13 November 2014)	3 June 2014	22 March 2017	VP	
Femke Merel van Kooten-Arissen	PvdD	Van Kooten-Arissen	16 July 2019	5 May 2020		
Femke Merel van Kooten-Arissen	PvdD	Krol/Van Kooten	6 May 2020	7 August 2020		
Femke Merel van Kooten-Arissen	PvdD	Van Kooten-Arissen	8 August 2020	30 March 2021	Splinter	
Wim Kortenoeven	PVV	Kortenoeven/Hernandez	3 July 2012	18 September 2012		
Henk Krol	50+	Krol	3 May 2020	5 May 2020	PvdT	
Henk Krol	50+	Krol/Van Kooten	6 May 2020	7 August 2020		
Henk Krol	50+	Krol	8 August 2020	30 March 2021	Henk Krol List	
Hubert Kronenburg	BP	Harmsen	27 June 1968	11 November 1968	BR	
Hubert Kronenburg	BP	Kronenburg	12 November 1968	8 May 1971	Democrats 2000	
Tunahan Kuzu	PvdA	Kuzu/Öztürk	14 November 2014	22 March 2017	Denk	
Annelotte Lammers	PVV	Markuszower	20 January 2026		DNA	
Ali Lazrak	SP	Lazrak	3 February 2004	28 November 2006		
Rie Lips-Odinot	CPN	Gortzak	14 April 1958	19 March 1959	SWP	
Gidi Markuszower	PVV	Markuszower	20 January 2026		DNA	
Nicole Moinat	PVV	Markuszower	20 January 2026		DNA	
Jacques Monasch	PvdA	Monasch	8 November 2016	22 March 2017	Nieuwe Wegen	
Hilbrand Nawijn	LPF	Nawijn	23 June 2005	28 November 2006	PvN	
Jet Nijpels	AOV	Nijpels	6 September 1995	18 May 1998	S2000	
Govert Nooteboom	D66	Nooteboom	22 June 1976	9 June 1977	DAC	
Marjet Ockels	PvdA	Ockels	21 September 1993	16 May 1994	DNP	
Selçuk Öztürk	PvdA	Kuzu/Öztürk	14 November 2014	22 March 2017	Denk	
Pieter Omtzigt	CDA	Omtzigt	15 September 2021	5 December 2023	NSC	
Gonny van Oudenallen	LPF	Van Oudenallen	7 July 2006	28 November 2006		
Nicki Pouw-Verweij	JA21	BBB	1 September 2023	5 December 2023		
Anton van Schijndel	VVD	Van Schijndel	6 September 2006	23 September 2006		
Anton van Schijndel	VVD	Eerdmans/Van Schijndel	25 September 2006	28 November 2006	One NL	
Shanna Schilder	PVV	Markuszower	20 January 2026		DNA	
Jan Nico Scholten	CDA	Scholten/Dijkman	8 December 1983	18 April 1985		
Jan Nico Scholten	CDA	Scholten	19 April 1985	2 June 1986		
Wybrand Schuitemaker	PvdA	Goedhart	14 May 1970	9 May 1971	DS'70	
Hans Smolders	FvD	Van Haga	13 May 2021	5 December 2023	BVNL	
Fred van der Spek	PSP	Van der Spek	21 January 1986	2 June 1986	PSO	
Fia van Veenendaal-van Meggelen	PvdA	Goedhart	18 July 1970	9 May 1971	DS'70	
Wil Verkerk	AOV	Verkerk/Van Wingerden	30 May 1995	29 August 1995		
Wil Verkerk	AOV	Verkerk	31 March 1998	18 May 1998		
Rita Verdonk	VVD	Verdonk	13 September 2007	16 June 2009	TON	
Nico Verlaan	BP	Verlaan	17 March 1971	9 May 1971	Van Velzen List	
Roland van Vliet	PVV	Van Vliet	21 March 2014	22 March 2017		
Poulus Voogd	BP	Voogd	14 December 1966	21 February 1967	Voogd List	
Aad Wagenaar	RPF	Wagenaar	23 April 1985	2 June 1986	AR'85	
Gerben Wagenaar	CPN	Gortzak	14 April 1958	19 March 1959	SWP	
Harry Wijnschenk	LPF	Wijnschenk	14 November 2002	29 January 2003	LPN	
Geert Wilders	VVD	Wilders	3 September 2004	28 November 2006	PVV	
Cees van Wingerden	AOV	Verkerk/Van Wingerden	30 May 1995	29 August 1995		

== Senate ==
List of defections in the Senate
MP	Parliamentary group		Period		Associated party	Ref.
MP	Former	New	Begin date	End date	Associated party	Ref.
Robert Baljeu	FvD	Otten	15 December 2020	14 February 2021	GO	
Martin Batenburg	AOV	Batenburg	7 April 1998	7 June 1999		
Hugo Berkhout	FvD	Van Pareren	30 November 2020	14 February 2021	JA21	
Hugo Berkhout	FvD	Nanninga	15 February 2021	12 June 2023	JA21	
Toine Beukering	FvD	Van Pareren	30 November 2020	14 February 2021	JA21	
Toine Beukering	FvD	Nanninga	15 February 2021	12 June 2023	JA21	
Toine Beukering	JA21	Beukering	18 November 2025			
Robert Croll	BBB	D66	2 June 2025			
Anne-Wil Duthler	VVD	Duthler	26 April 2019	10 June 2019		
Paul Frentrop	FvD	Frentrop	31 March 2022	12 June 2023		
Robert van Gasteren	BBB	Van Gasteren	31 March 2026			
Arie Griffioen	BBB	D66	28 November 2025			
Jan Hendriks	AOV	Hendriks	12 September 1995	15 June 1998		
Jan Hendriks	AOV	CDA	16 June 1998	7 June 1999		
Otto Hermans	FvD	Van Pareren	30 November 2020	14 February 2021	JA21	
Otto Hermans	FvD	Nanninga	15 February 2021	12 June 2023	JA21	
Theo Hiddema	FvD	Frentrop	31 March 2022	12 June 2023		
Eric Kemperman	BBB	Kemperman	19 May 2025	8 September 2025		
Eric Kemperman	BBB	FvD	9 September 2025			
Kees de Lange	OSF	De Lange	18 May 2015	8 June 2015		
Lennart van der Linden	FvD	Van Pareren	14 December 2020	14 February 2021	JA21	
Lennart van der Linden	FvD	Nanninga	15 February 2021	12 June 2023	JA21	
Bertus Maris	BP	Maris	15 February 1978	15 September 1980		
Annabel Nanninga	FvD	Nanninga	15 February 2021	12 June 2023	JA21	
Henk Otten	FvD	Otten	29 July 2019	12 June 2023	GO	
Bob van Pareren	FvD	Van Pareren	30 November 2020	14 February 2021	JA21	
Bob van Pareren	FvD	Nanninga	15 February 2021	12 June 2023	JA21	
Dorien Rookmaker	FvD	Otten	19 August 2019	8 February 2020	GO	
Cees van de Sanden	VVD	Van de Sanden	8 October 2025			
Ingrid Visseren-Hamakers	PvdD	Visseren-Hamakers	10 November 2025			
Jeroen de Vries	FvD	Otten	19 August 2019	12 June 2023	GO	
Pim Walenkamp	BBB	Walenkamp	23 September 2025			
Loek van Wely	FvD	Van Pareren	8 December 2020	14 February 2021	JA21	
Loek van Wely	FvD	Nanninga	15 February 2021	12 June 2023	JA21	
Düzgün Yildirim	SP	Yildirim	25 September 2007	6 June 2011		

== Source ==
- Waling, Geerten (2017). Zetelroof. Fractiediscipline en afsplitsing in de Tweede Kamer 1917-2017 (in Dutch). VanTilt. ISBN 978-94-6004-314-7.
