= List of members of the House of Representatives of the Netherlands for Political Party of Radicals =

The Political Party of Radicals (PPR) has had 15 members in the House of Representatives between its first election in 1971 and the merger into GroenLinks after the 1989 general election. During the 1967–1971 term, Jacques Aarden, Paul Janssen and Annie Kessel were associated with the PPR in the House, but as a parliamentary defection from the Catholic People's Party (KVP) were not allowed to carry the name of the party and were instead called the 'Aarden Group'.

== List ==
List of members of the House of Representatives of the Netherlands for Political Party of Radicals
Member	Term start	Term end	Ref.
Jacques Aarden	11 May 1971	6 December 1972	
Ria Beckers	8 June 1977	13 September 1989	
Dolf Coppes	7 December 1972	7 June 1977	
Stef Dijkman	18 April 1985	2 June 1986	
Bas de Gaay Fortman	25 May 1971	7 June 1977	
Pier van Gorkum	7 December 1972	15 September 1975	
Dilia van der Heem-Wagemakers	28 May 1973	7 June 1977	
Michel van Hulten	7 December 1972	10 May 1973	
Michel van Hulten	8 June 1977	7 September 1977	
Leo Jansen	7 December 1972	9 June 1981	
Erik Jurgens	7 December 1972	22 September 1975	
Kees van Kuijen	23 September 1975	7 June 1977	
Peter Lankhorst	10 June 1981	13 September 1989	
Henk Waltmans	7 December 1972	7 June 1977	
Henk Waltmans	15 September 1977	15 September 1982	
Michel van Winkel	16 September 1975	7 June 1977	

== Source ==
- * Van den Belt, Christoph; Krabbendam, Hans; Van Meurs, Wim; Oprel, Marieke, eds. (2022). De Politieke Partij Radikalen 1968-1990. Macht uit het zadel (PDF) (in Dutch). Amsterdam: Boom. ISBN 978-90-244-5134-0.
