= List of general elections in the Netherlands =

30 elections for the House of Representatives have been held in the Netherlands since the introduction of party-list proportional representation in 1918.

== List ==
List of general elections since 1918
Election	Turnout	Votes			Largest party		Ref.
Election	Turnout	Valid	Blank	Invalid	Party	Vote share	Ref.
3 July 1918	88.34	1,341,744	Unknown	Unknown	RKSP	30.03	
5 July 1922	91.45	2,824,558	1,812	49,984	RKSP	29.86	
1 July 1925	86.77	2,738,160	3,275	37,964	RKSP	28.63	
3 July 1929	89.61	3,168,258	4,299	42,678	RKSP	29.38	
26 April 1933	94.22	3,721,828	107,097	68,585	RKSP	27.92	
26 May 1937	94.40	4,058,047	77,587	77,239	RKSP	28.87	
17 May 1946	93.10	4,760,711	Unknown (Note: The total number of blank and invalid votes is 151,304)	Unknown	KVP	31.12	
7 July 1948	91.17	4,931,499	Unknown	Unknown	KVP	31.04	
25 June 1952	92.29	5,335,456	Unknown	Unknown	PvdA	28.97	
13 June 1956	95.54	5,726,981	Unknown (Note: The total number of blank and invalid votes is 122,626)	Unknown	PvdA	32.69	
12 March 1959	95.61	5,999,530	Unknown (Note: The total number of blank and invalid votes is 143,879)	Unknown	KVP	31.60	
15 May 1963	95.15	6,258,005	Unknown (Note: The total number of blank and invalid votes is 161,441)	Unknown	KVP	31.88	
15 February 1967	95.00	6,879,500	Unknown (Note: The total number of blank and invalid votes is 198,298)	Unknown	KVP	26.50	
28 April 1971	79.12	6,320,012	Unknown (Note: The total number of blank and invalid votes is 46,567)	Unknown	PvdA	24.60	
29 November 1972	83.51	7,394,045	21,387	29,855	PvdA	27.34	
26 May 1981	87.03	8,690,837	Unknown (Note: The total number of blank and invalid votes is 47,401)	Unknown	CDA	33.83	
8 September 1982	80.98	8,236,516	Unknown (Note: The total number of blank and invalid votes is 37,115)	Unknown	PvdA	30.40	
21 May 1986	85.76	9,172,159	Unknown (Note: The total number of blank and invalid votes is 27,462)	Unknown	CDA	34.59	
6 September 1989	80.27	8,876,514	Unknown (Note: The total number of blank and invalid votes is 26,389)	Unknown	CDA	35.32	
3 May 1994	78.75	8,981,556	Unknown (Note: The total number of blank and invalid votes is 39,727)	Unknown	PvdA	23.97	
6 May 1998	73.35	8,607,787	Unknown (Note: The total number of blank and invalid votes is 14,435)	Unknown	PvdA	28.98	
15 May 2002	79.06	9,501,152	Unknown (Note: The total number of blank and invalid votes is 14,074)	Unknown	CDA	27.93	
22 January 2003	80.04	9,654,475	Unknown (Note: The total number of blank and invalid votes is 12,127)	Unknown	CDA	28.62	
22 November 2006	80.35	9,838,683	Unknown (Note: The total number of blank and invalid votes is 16,315)	Unknown	CDA	28.51	
9 June 2010	75.40	9,416,001	8,829	18,147	VVD	20.49	
12 September 2012	74.57	9,424,235	17,004	20,984	VVD	26.58	
15 March 2017	81.57	10,516,041	15,876	31,539	VVD	21.29	
17 March 2021	78.71	10,422,852	17,173	22,652	VVD	21.87	
22 November 2023	77.75	10,432,726	19,655	22,822	PVV	23.49	
29 October 2025	78.30	10,571,990	40,128	28,206	D66	16.94	

== See also ==
- Next Dutch general election
- List of Dutch cabinet formations
- Historic composition of the House of Representatives of the Netherlands
