= Historic composition of the House of Representatives of the Netherlands =

The Historic composition of the House of Representatives of the Netherlands gives an overview of the composition of the House of Representatives (lower house) of the Dutch parliament. It shows the composition after elections, splits from parties are not included.

== 1815 to 1887 ==
The House of Representatives of the Netherlands was established in 1815 when the United Kingdom of the Netherlands was created. Initially it consisted of 110 members, elected by the provincial councils. Members served a three-year term, with one third of the seats up for election each year. In 1830, the southern provinces declared their independence in the Belgian Revolution, to become Belgium. Initially the Netherlands did not recognise this, but the 55 seats in the House of Representatives representing these provinces remained vacant, so the de facto membership was reduced to 55 members. After the Treaty of London in 1839, the Dutch government recognised the separation of Belgium, and became the Kingdom of the Netherlands. In 1840 the constitution was changed; all southern provinces except the eastern half of the province of Limburg (with three representatives) had left the Kingdom of the Netherlands, so the size of the House of Representatives was fixed at 58 members.

The Constitutional Reform of 1848 resulted in direct elections to the House of Representatives. Members served a four-year term, with half of the seats up for election every two years. The total membership was set at one member for each 45000 Dutch citizens; so the house increased to 68 members; in 1859 it grew further to 72 members.

== 1888-1917 ==
The constitution of 1887 changed the system; election were held every 4 years for all members at the same time, using a district system, and the total membership was set at 100 members.

Party	1888 –1891	1891 –1894	1894 –1897	1897 –1901	1901 –1905	1905 –1909	1909 –1913	1913 –1917	1917 –1918
Conservative	1								
RKSP	25	25	25	22	25	25	25	25	24
ARP	27	21	15	17	23	15	25	11	12
VAR				5	7				
CHP						7			
CHU							10	10	9
BVL				13	8	9	4	10	10
Liberal Union	46	53	57	35	18	25	20	19	21
RB		1	3	4					
VDB					9	11	9	7	8
SDAP				2	6	6	7	18	15
SDB	1								
Independent Socialist				1	1	1			
CHK				1	1				
FB					1	1			
Independent AR					1				
Total	100	100	100	100	100	100	100	100	100

== 1917-1956: Introduction of proportional representation ==
For the 1918 election, the constitution was changed: the districts system was abandoned, and proportional representation was used.

Party	1918 –1922	1922 –1925	1925 –1929	1929 –1933	1933 –1937	1937 –1945	1946 –1948	1948 –1952	1952 –1956	1956 –1959 (Note: Before enlargement)
RKSP	30	32	30	30	28	31				
KVP							32	32	30	33
RKVP/KDP			1		1					
ARP	13	16	13	12	14	17	13	13	12	10
CHU	7	11	11	11	10	8	8	9	9	8
CDP	1									
CDU					1	2				
SGP		1	2	3	3	2	2	2	2	2
HGSP			1	1	1					
BVL	4									
Liberal Union	6									
EB	3									
LSP		10	9	8	7	4				
VVD							6	8	9	9
VDB	5	5	7	7	6	6				
SDAP	22	20	24	24	22	23				
PvdA							29	27	30	34
SDP/CPH/CPN	2	2	1	2	4	3	10	8	6	4
RSP/RSAP					1					
SP	1									
PB	1	2	1	1	1					
NSB						4				
BCS	1									
VDW	1									
NP	1									
CSP	1									
MP	1									
LP		1								
MPS&L				1						
VNH					1					
KNP								1	2	
Total	100	100	100	100	100	100	100	100	100	100

== 1956-2002: Enlargement of the House ==
In 1956 the House of Representatives was enlarged from 100 to 150 members.

CPN / SP / PSP / GL / PPR / EVP / PvdA / D66 / Pensioners' parties (Note: General Elderly Alliance and Unie 55+) / Others / DS'70 / KVP / CDA / ARP / CHU / VVD / RPF / GPV / SGP / BP / CP / CD
1956	7 / 50 / 49 / 15 / 13 / 13 / 3
1959	3 / 2 / 48 / 49 / 14 / 12 / 19 / 3
1963	4 / 4 / 43 / 50 / 13 / 13 / 16 / 1 / 3 / 3
1967	5 / 4 / 37 / 7 / 42 / 15 / 12 / 17 / 1 / 3 / 7
1971	6 / 2 / 2 / 39 / 11 / 2 / 8 / 35 / 13 / 10 / 16 / 2 / 3 / 1
1972	7 / 2 / 7 / 39 / 6 / 1 / 6 / 27 / 14 / 7 / 22 / 2 / 3 / 3
1977	2 / 1 / 3 / 53 / 8 / 1 / 49 / 28 / 1 / 3 / 1
1981	3 / 3 / 3 / 1 / 47 / 17 / 48 / 26 / 2 / 1 / 3
1982	3 / 3 / 2 / 44 / 6 / 45 / 36 / 2 / 1 / 3 / 1
1986	1 / 3 / 52 / 9 / 54 / 27 / 1 / 1 / 3
1989	6 / 49 / 12 / 54 / 22 / 1 / 2 / 3 / 1
1994	2 / 5 / 37 / 24 / 7 / 34 / 31 / 3 / 2 / 2 / 3
1998	5 / 11 / 45 / 14 / 29 / 38 / 3 / 2 / 2

Party	1956 –1959	1959 –1963	1963 –1967	1967 –1971	1971 –1972	1972 –1977	1977 –1981	1981 –1982	1982 –1986	1986 –1989	1989 –1994	1994 –1998	1998 –2002
KVP	49	49	50	42	35	27							
ARP	15	14	13	15	13	14							
CHU	13	12	13	12	10	7							
CDA							49	48	45	54	54	34	29
PvdA	50	48	43	37	39	43	53	44	47	52	49	37	45
VVD	13	19	16	17	16	22	28	26	36	27	22	31	38
D66				7	11	6	8	17	6	9	12	24	14
SGP	3	3	3	3	3	3	3	3	3	3	3	2	2
GPV			1	1	2	2	1	1	1	1	2	2	2
RPF								2	2	1	1	3	3
PSP		2	4	4	2	2	1	3	3	1			
PPR					2	7	3	3	2	2			
CPN	7	3	4	5	6	7	2	3	3				
EVP									1				
GL											6	5	11
SP												2	5
CD											1	3	
CP									1				
AOV												6	
Unie 55+												1	
DS '70					8	6	1						
BP			3	7	1	3	1						
RKPN						1							
NMP					2								
Total	150	150	150	150	150	150	150	150	150	150	150	150	150

== 2002-present: Fragmentation ==
PvdD / SP / GL / GL/PvdA / Denk / PvdA / Volt / D66 / 50+ / Others / CU / NSC / CDA / VVD / SGP / BBB / JA21 / LPF / PVV / FvD
2002	9 / 10 / 23 / 7 / 2 / 4 / 43 / 24 / 2 / 26
2003	9 / 8 / 42 / 6 / 3 / 44 / 28 / 2 / 8
2006	2 / 25 / 7 / 33 / 3 / 6 / 41 / 22 / 2 / 9
2010	2 / 15 / 10 / 30 / 10 / 5 / 21 / 31 / 2 / 24
2012	2 / 15 / 4 / 38 / 12 / 2 / 5 / 13 / 41 / 3 / 15
2017	5 / 14 / 14 / 3 / 9 / 19 / 4 / 5 / 19 / 33 / 3 / 20 / 2
2021	6 / 9 / 8 / 3 / 3 / 9 / 24 / 1 / 1 / 5 / 15 / 34 / 3 / 1 / 3 / 17 / 8
2023	3 / 5 / 25 / 3 / 2 / 9 / 1 / 3 / 5 / 20 / 24 / 3 / 7 / 1 / 37 / 3
2025	3 / 3 / 20 / 3 / 1 / 26 / 2 / 3 / 18 / 22 / 3 / 4 / 9 / 26 / 7

Party	2002 –2003	2003 –2006	2006 –2010	2010 –2012	2012 –2017	2017 –2021	2021 –2023	2023 –2025	2025 –present
VVD	24	28	22	31	41	33	34	24	22
CDA	43	44	41	21	13	19	15	5	18
PvdA	23	42	33	30	38	9	9		
GL	10	8	7	10	4	14	8		
GL/PvdA								25	20
PVV			9	24	15	20	17	37	26
SP	9	9	25	15	15	14	9	5	3
D66	7	6	3	10	12	19	24	9	26
CU	4	3	6	5	5	5	5	3	3
LPF	26	8							
NSC								20	
PvdD			2	2	2	5	6	3	3
SGP	2	2	2	2	3	3	3	3	3
FvD						2	8	3	7
Denk						3	3	3	3
BBB							1	7	4
50PLUS					2	4	1		2
Volt							3	2	1
JA21							3	1	9
LN	2								
BIJ1							1		
Total	150	150	150	150	150	150	150	150	150

== See also ==
- List of cabinets of the Netherlands
- List of prime ministers of the Netherlands
- Historic composition of the Eerste Kamer
- List of general elections in the Netherlands
