= Left Laser =

Dutch communist media platform

- Created by: Bob Scholte
- Presented by: Bob Scholte; Norya Maria Figueiredo; Arno van der Veen

Original release
- Network: YouTube
- Release: 22 August 2022 – present

Left Laser is a Dutch communist media platform launched in 2022 in which journalist Bob Scholte asks critical questions of politicians, activists, and other public figures. Left Laser is present on YouTube, TikTok, and Instagram. As of August 2026, Left Laser has 91.4 thousand subscribers on YouTube, 167 thousand followers on Instagram and 122.2 thousand followers on TikTok.

== History ==
The YouTube channel Left Laser, which was initially intended as an experiment in political communication, was founded in 2022 by Bob Scholte under the pseudonym Bob Sneevliet, a reference to Dutch revolutionary socialist Henk Sneevliet. Scholte, a member of the Socialist Party (SP) until the age of 18, and of Revolutionaire Eenheid (Revolutionary Unity), a now defunct small Maoist group, entered activism as a sociology student at Erasmus University Rotterdam, where he participated in solidarity protests around the 2015 Maagdenhuis occupation in Amsterdam, which sought further democratisation of universities and safeguarding the study of philosophy.

The channel grew rapidly, partly thanks to videos in which political opponents on the street are confronted with sharp, sometimes provocative questions. The method has been compared to that of GeenStijl and PowNed, which led to several controversial incidents, including incidents in 2023 where a spokesperson for the People's Party for Freedom and Democracy (VVD) and Yoeri Albrecht, the head of debate centre De Balie, snatched the microphone from Scholte in response to questioning. The VVD spokesperson was subsequently forced to apologize publicly.

In November 2024, footage made by Scholte about pro-Palestine demonstrations in Amsterdam went viral after showing a woman falling down after being struck by the police. The Amsterdam police and municipality had previously denied that the woman was wounded as a consequence of police brutality.

In 2026, Left Laser announced via a video that they had been denied entry to the building of the Dutch House of Representatives, as had already been the case for Tim Hofman and Roel Maalderink. Following this announcement, parliamentary questions were asked by the SP and GroenLinks-PvdA. After media attention and parliamentary questions, the request was eventually approved.

On May 14, 2026, Israeli-Dutch politician Gidi Markuszower was interviewed by Left Laser. During the interview, Markuszower advocated for the use of more force than Israel currently employs to stop Palestinian refugees at the Dutch border, which drew heavy criticism from the media and politicians. On May 15, the human rights organization The Rights Forum announced that it would file a complaint against Markuszower regarding his statements in the video.

During a housing protest in Amsterdam in October 2026, he was reportedly pushed, restrained, and pulled by two individuals suspected of being affiliated with Antifa. As a communist journalist, he has had longstanding ideological disagreements with Antifa.

== Ideology ==
According to Scholte, the goal of Left Laser is to strengthen the moral and ideological resilience of young communists and to create alternative left-wing media institutions. He emphasized the importance of contemporary forms of propaganda, such as the social media platforms TikTok and YouTube, as modern equivalents of the party newspaper that Vladimir Lenin wrote about. In its editorial charter, Left Laser is described as an independent communist platform, which views its journalism as part of class struggle.

Scholte, despite condemning the 2022 Russian invasion of Ukraine as illegal, has opposed military support to Ukraine because of "a nationalist tendency that is fascistic", as well as allegations published by Left Laser that Dutch weapons had fallen into the hands of a far right Russian militia fighting on the side of Ukraine. He has criticised Ukraine for not holding elections during wartime, and has advocated for de-escalating the conflict.
