= Elections in the Netherlands =

Elections in the Netherlands are held for five territorial levels of government: the European Union, the state, the twelve provinces, the 21 water boards and the 342 municipalities (and the three public bodies in the Caribbean Netherlands). Apart from elections, referendums were also held occasionally, but were removed from the law in 2018.

At the national level, legislative power is vested in the States General, which is bicameral. The House of Representatives has 150 members elected for a four-year term by proportional representation. Elections are also called after a dissolution of the House of Representatives. All elections are direct, except for the Senate, which has 75 members elected for a four-year term by provincial councillors on the basis of proportional representation at the provincial elections.

The Netherlands has a multi-party system, with numerous political parties, in which usually no one party ever secures an overall majority of votes (except occasionally in very small municipalities, such as Tubbergen), so that several parties must cooperate to form a coalition government. This usually includes the party supported by a plurality of voters, with only three exceptions since World War II, in 1971, 1977 and 1982, when the Labour Party (PvdA) was the largest party but did not take part in the coalition.

Candidates to the elections of the House of Representatives are chosen from party lists according to a system of semi-open list proportional representation. The legal threshold is 1/150th of the total number of valid votes.

During the municipal elections of 2006, elections were electronic throughout the country. As a result, results were known before the end of the day, a mere two hours after the closing of the poll stations. For the national elections in November of that same year, however, several polling stations decided to return to paper and red pencil because of security issues with the voting machines. Since then, most elections have been held using paper and pencil.

== Timing ==
The maximum parliamentary term is five years and elections are generally held about four years after the previous one. Regular elections, i.e. after the House of Representatives has fulfilled its term, take place in March. If municipal or provincial elections already take place in March of that year, the parliamentary election is postponed to May. Elections are planned for spring to ensure that a new cabinet is formed in time to present its plans on the most important day in the Dutch Parliament, Prinsjesdag. If the House of Representatives is dissolved prematurely, due to a severe conflict between the House of Representatives and cabinet, or within the cabinet, a snap election takes place as soon as possible, usually after two months to give parties time to prepare. The term of the next House can be shortened or prolonged by almost a year to ensure the next normal election again takes place in March or May.

Municipal and provincial elections always take place every four years, in March; municipal elections always two years after a year divisible by four, and provincial elections one year after municipal elections. Municipal councils and provincial councils cannot be dissolved prematurely, so no snap elections can occur. An exception to the four-year term is made when two or more municipalities merge and a new election takes place for the merged municipality.

Senate elections also take place every four years, in May following the provincial elections. The Senate can be dissolved, and subsequently snap elections take place, but since the provincial councils remain the same, this seldom occurs. A Senate elected in a snap election sits out the remainder of its predecessor's term.

Elections usually take place on Wednesdays, but the government can decide to change this to a Tuesday, Thursday or Friday if there are good reasons to do so (e.g. when the election day coincides with a national holiday). Elections for the European Parliament always take place on a Thursday.

== Eligibility ==
Every Dutch citizen who has reached the age of 18 is eligible to vote ("active suffrage") or to stand for election as a member of the House of Representatives ("passive suffrage"). A notable exception is municipal elections, in which persons younger than 18 can be elected, although they may not take their seat until their 18th birthday. Also, for the municipal election one does not have to be Dutch; residents who are citizens of another EU country are also eligible to vote, as well as citizens of other countries who have lived (legally) in the Netherlands for five years. Someone may be deprived of these rights if they are mentally incapable of making a reasoned choice or have lost their right to vote by court sentence. Two weeks before an election all voters receive a card, which is the evidence that they are entitled to vote, and this card must be handed over at the polling station before voting. Voting is not compulsory. Compulsory voting was introduced along with universal manhood suffrage in 1917, but it was abolished in 1967.

It is not necessary or even possible specifically to register as a voter for elections in the Netherlands: every resident inhabitant of the Netherlands is required to register as such with the municipality in which they are living, and this data (which includes their nationality and date of birth) is the basis from which the electoral register is derived.

Dutch citizens who live abroad (and have deregistered themselves as a Dutch resident) are allowed to vote for the House of Representatives and for the European Parliament, but not for municipal or provincial elections. They do need to register themselves as a voter.

== System ==
The House of Representatives is elected using an open party list system of proportional representation; parties submit one or more ranked lists of candidates. However, voters can choose any candidate, and they can thereby alter the ordering.

== Election ==
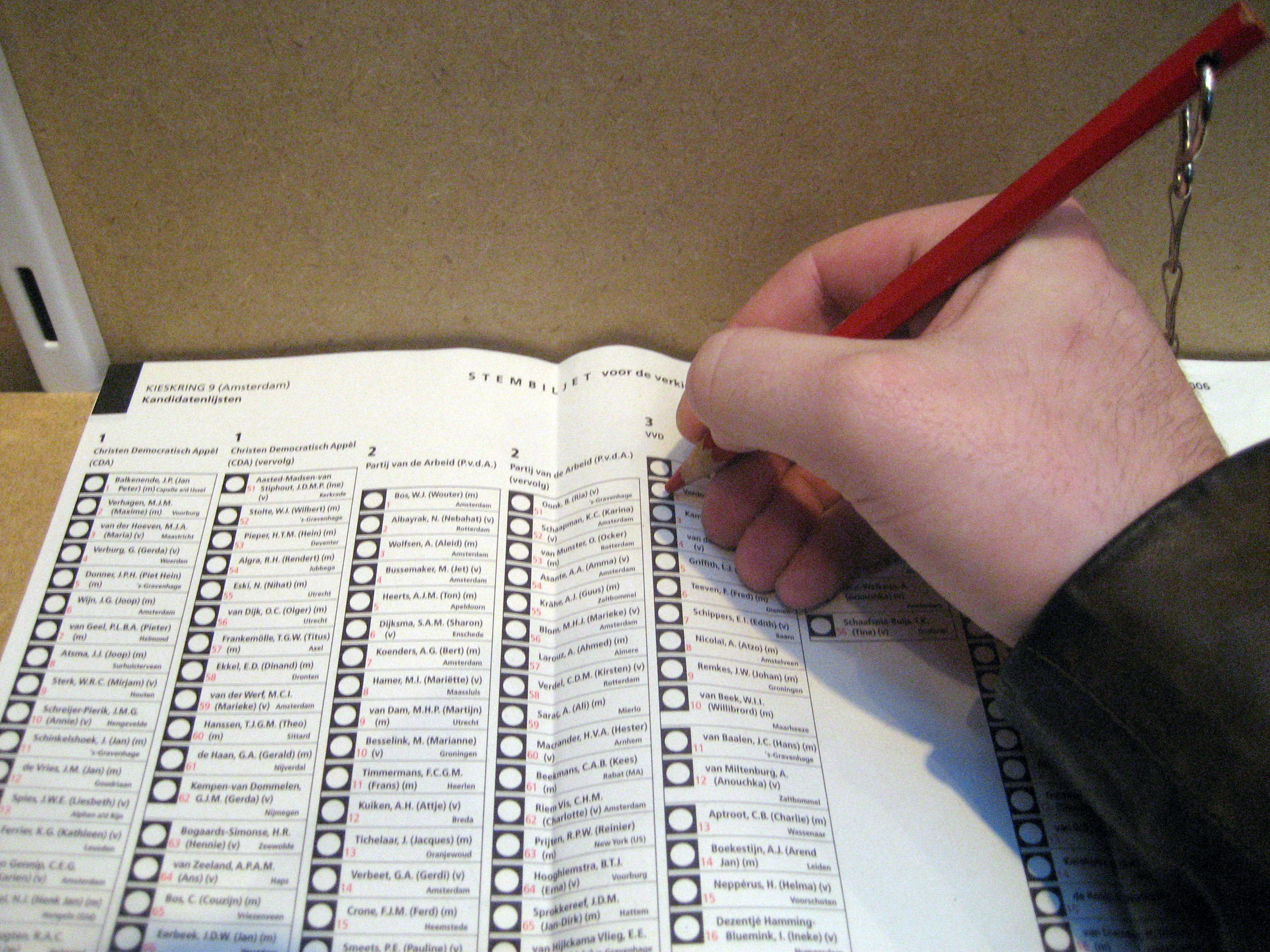
Voting using "paper and red pencil": the voter colours in the box preceding the name of their favored candidate.

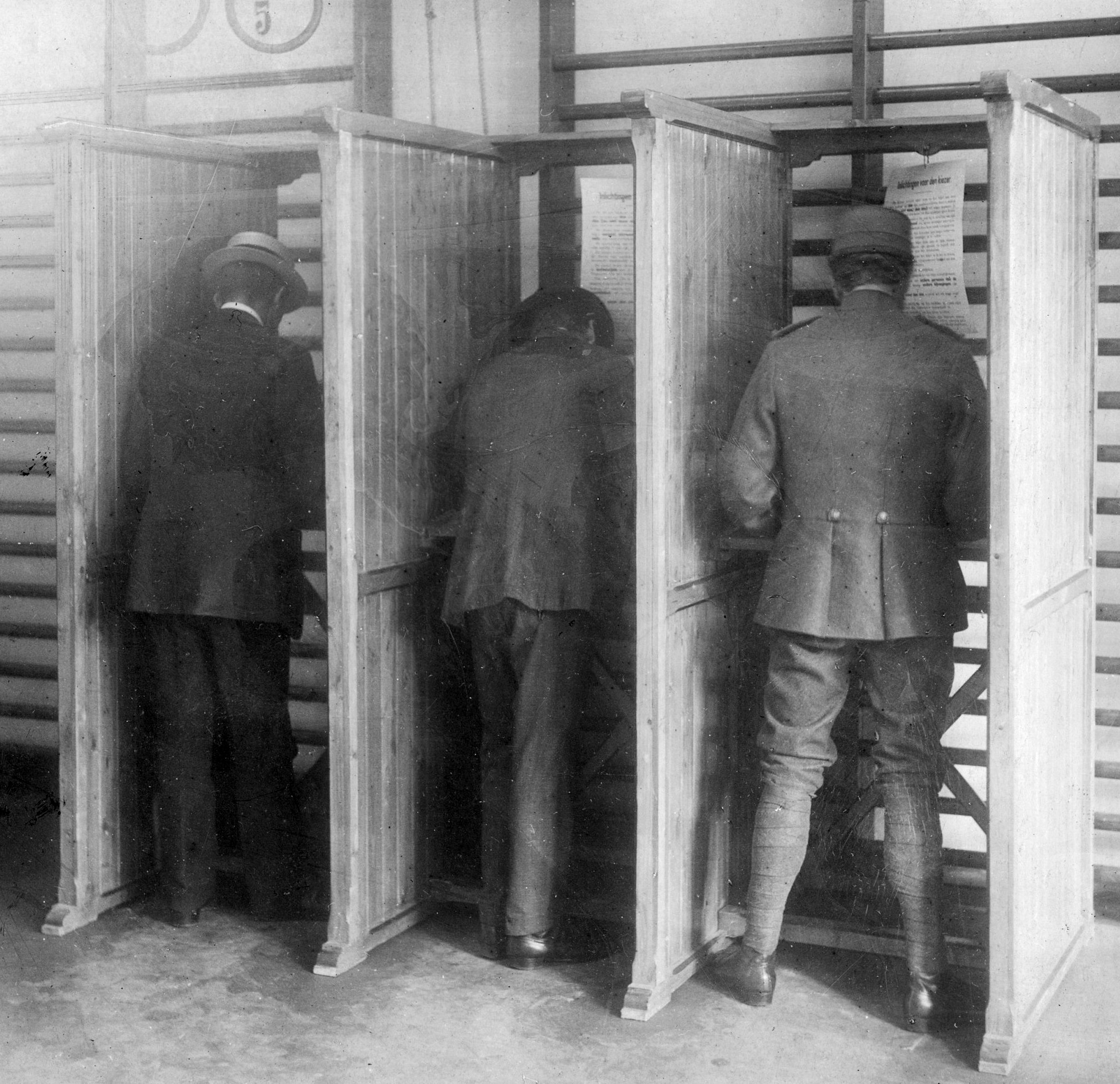
Voting at Dutch elections in 1918

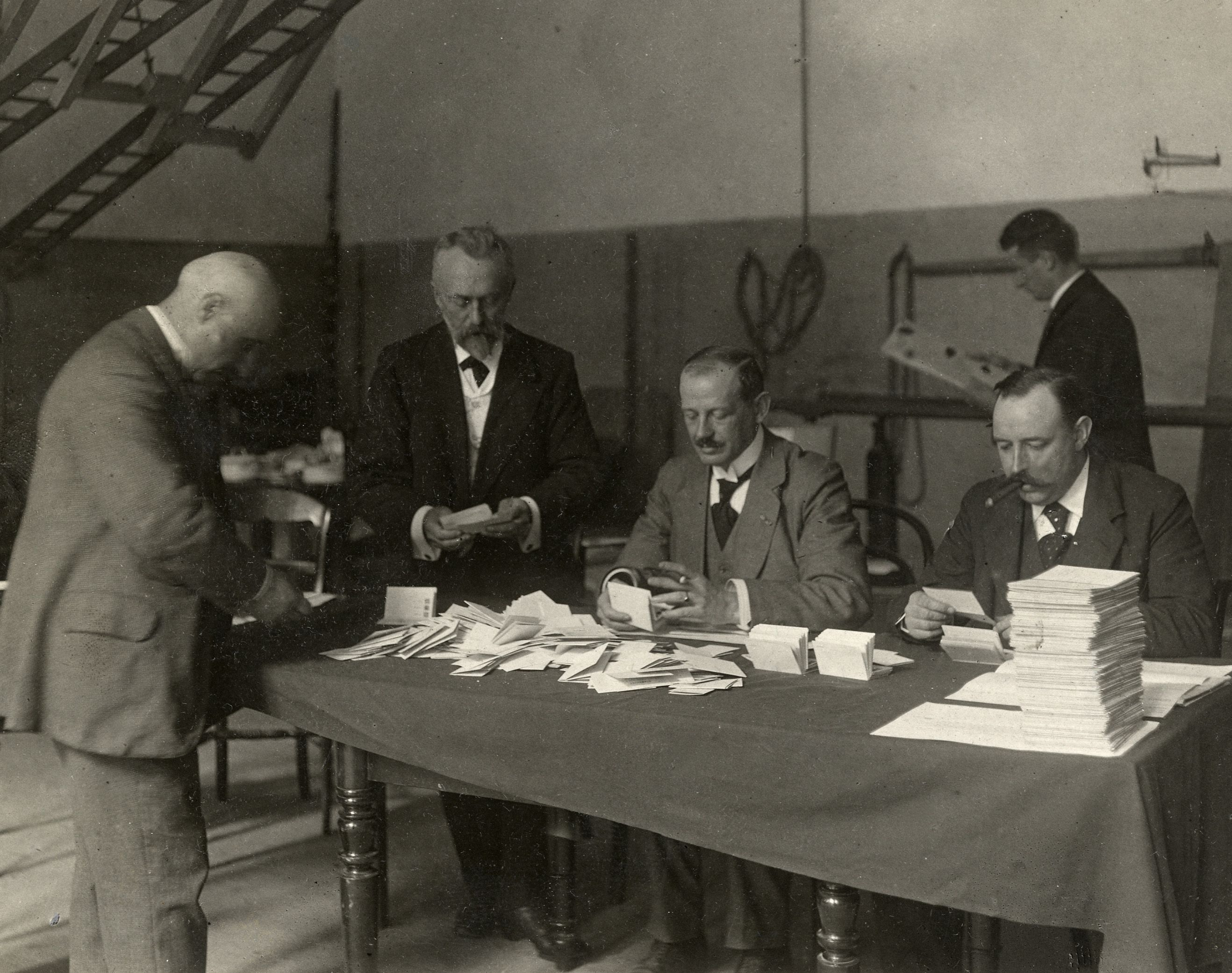
Vote counting at Dutch elections in 1913

For all elections polling is organised on the basis of municipalities. In each municipality there are multiple voting stations, usually in communal buildings, such as churches, schools, and more recently, railway stations.

When arriving at a voting station, voters prove their identity by showing their passport or driving licence. They hand in their card or pass to one of the three attendants of the voting station, who checks the card, cancels it, issues ballot papers to the voter, and directs them to the polling booth, where the voter indicates his or her preference for just one candidate.

Dutch citizens living abroad are able to vote by registering in advance and then using a postal vote. The results are counted by the municipality of The Hague and included in its own results.

For mayoral and provincial gubernatorial positions, the Netherlands is one of the few countries in Europe where no elections are held. Instead, they are appointed by the Crown, after recommendation by the municipal or provincial council respectively.

== Post-election ==
Polls close at 21:00 and the votes are counted immediately. The preliminary results are generally known around midnight and announced the next morning, after which the 150 seats are allocated. However, recounting over the course of the following days sometimes throws up minor shifts in the allocation of seats.

=== Seat assignment for general election ===
The electorate in the Netherlands during the general election on the 22nd of November 2023 was 13,473,750, of whom 77.7% voted, resulting in 10,475,203 votes (of which 10,432,726 valid votes). With 150 seats, that means a quota of 69,552 votes per seat, the so-called Hare quota. Since the election threshold is equal to the quota, that is also the number of votes required to get one seat in the House of Representatives. Many parties do not achieve that quota, which leaves some seats unfilled.

The way these residual seats are assigned, by using the D'Hondt method, a highest averages method, means that smaller parties are unlikely to get a residual seat, while larger parties have a bigger chance of getting one and may even get more than one.

For example, in 2003, the three biggest parties each got two of the six residual seats, even the VVD (150*0.179=26.85, but they got 28 seats, representing 18.7% of the seats instead of 17.9%), whereas the Socialist Party got none (150*0.063 = 9.45, but they got only 9 seats, representing 6% of the seats instead of 6.3%).

When the largest party gets over 35% of the votes and is considerably bigger than its nearest rival, it may get as much as 3 or even 4 residual seats. This has, however, never happened.

The percentage of votes for the biggest party is usually around 30% and rarely goes far above that. The largest result ever was at the 1989 elections, when the Christian Democratic Appeal (CDA) got 35% of the votes. Even then, however, CDA only got two residual seats because next biggest party, the Labour Party (PvdA), had 32% of the votes. The biggest difference between the first and second party was at the 2002 elections, the most dramatic elections in Dutch history, when the PvdA lost many votes to the Pim Fortuyn List (LPF). The LPF's 17% vote share was second biggest after the CDA's. However, the CDA received only 28% of the votes and was therefore still only assigned two residual seats.

=== Electoral alliances ===
Historically, parties had the option of forming an electoral alliance (Dutch: lijstverbinding), a form of apparentement, in which case they would participate in the above calculations as one party and therefore increase their chance of being assigned residual seats. The allocation of those seats among the parties within an electoral alliance was, however, done using the largest remainder method, which is more favourable toward smaller parties rather than the bigger ones if there is a considerable difference in size. But the overall advantage was greatest for small parties of comparable size. The option of forming an electoral alliance was abolished in 2017.

=== Assigning people to seats ===
After seats are allocated to the parties, candidates have to be assigned to the seats. For the purpose of general elections, the Netherlands is divided into twenty electoral districts. Parties can present different lists in each district. In theory, a party can place different candidates on each of the 20 different lists. However, it is usual that at least the candidate ranked first on the list is the same person throughout the country. Since 1994, when the maximum number of candidates per list was raised, it has been common for parties to use the same list in every district, or vary only the last five candidates per district. Usually these five candidates are locally well known politicians, parties hope to attract extra votes with these candidates. However, because of their low position on the list, chances are low that these local candidates are elected.

The first step in the process of assigning people to the seats is calculating how many seats each of the different lists of a party gets, by adding the number of votes on each of the different lists together. If a party used the same list in more than one electoral district, these lists are seen as one list. Seat assignment to the different lists is done by using the largest remainder method.

The second step is calculating which candidate received on his or her own more votes than 25% of the electoral quota, by adding up all votes for a particular candidate on the different lists. These candidates are declared elected independent of the list order, and get one of the seats of the list where they received the most votes. If more candidates are elected on a list than the list received seats, the candidate with the lowest total number of votes is transferred to the list where he had his second best result.

As a third step, any remaining seats are assigned to the remaining candidates, based on their ranking on the list. Candidates who are elected on more than one list are assigned the seat from the list where they secured the highest number of individual votes. This process repeats until every seat is assigned. Elected members who later decide to leave parliament, have their seat filled by the next eligible candidate from that district’s list.

An exception to the above exists in the form of lijstduwer ("list pushers"), famous people (former politicians, but also sports people) who are put on the candidate list but will not accept a seat when they get enough votes for one. During the municipal elections in 2006 professor Joop van Holsteyn criticized this practice, saying someone on a candidate list should also be a serious candidate. This view is shared by other political scientists, but less so by politicians, who say that lijstduwers are on the list not to get elected but to show that they support that party and that the fact that they are at the bottom of the list makes it obvious they are not intended to get a seat. Still, writer Ronald Giphart (1998) and skater Hilbert van der Duim (1994) got a municipal council seat, which Giphart refused to fill. Professor Rudy Andeweg says this is close to fraud because the law requires someone on the candidate list to declare in writing to be willing to fill a seat.

== Other elections ==
=== Water boards ===
Elections for the water boards have some similarities to other elections mentioned above, but also some distinctive differences. Similar to municipal elections, there are national parties and local parties, and the party list system is used with proportional representation. Residents of 18 and over can vote and elections take place every four years.

In contrast to other elections, not all members of the water board are chosen by the residents of the water board area. The members of each water board are divided into four categories: inhabitants, agriculture, nature and commercial. Only board members in the inhabitants category are chosen in direct elections, the members in the other categories are appointed by representing organisations, e.g. chambers of commerce in the commercial category. Since 2015, residents vote in person, just like in other elections, and they take place every four years, on the same day as the provincial elections. Before 2015, votes were cast by post, over a period of about two weeks.

=== Island councils ===
The elections for the Island councils for the special municipalities of Bonaire, Sint Eustatius, and Saba take place at the same date as the provincial elections; for the first time in 2015.

== History ==
Following the proclamation of the Batavian Republic in 1795, elections were held for the newly-established National Assembly. Wealthy adult men who had sworn an oath to popular sovereignty were allowed to vote.

The first immigrant candidate to stand for election to the Dutch House of Representatives was Indonesian revolutionary, Tan Malaka. He ran under the Communist Party of Holland's third candidate in the 1922 General election. Though he did not take the seat.

== Latest elections ==
=== 2023 general election ===
Originally expected to take place in 2025, a snap election was called after the fourth Rutte cabinet collapsed on 7 July 2023 due to immigration policy disagreements between the coalition parties. The right-wing populist Party for Freedom (PVV), led by Geert Wilders, won 37 seats in the 150-seat House of Representatives, becoming the largest party for the first time. All four parties of the incumbent coalition government suffered losses.

=== 2023 Senate election ===
The Senate is elected indirectly, by the provincial councillors (who are themselves chosen in direct elections) and (in Bonaire, Sint Eustatius and Saba) the electoral colleges for the Senate.

=== 2023 provincial elections ===
In the 2023 provincial elections, BBB won a plurality of votes in all provinces.

== Next elections ==
The next elections in the Netherlands are planned for (in chronological order):

- 2027 Dutch provincial elections: 17 March 2027

== See also ==
- Referendums in the Netherlands
- Electoral Council
- Electoral calendar
- Electoral system
- Electronic voting examples#Netherlands
- Historic composition of the House of Representatives of the Netherlands
- Politics of the Netherlands
- List of Speaker of the House of Representatives elections (Netherlands)
