= Annelotte Lammers =

Dutch politician

Member of the House of Representatives
- Incumbent
- Assumed office 12 November 2025

Personal details
- Born: 12 April 1993 (age 33) Zwolle, Netherlands
- Party: DNA (since 2026)
- Other political affiliations: Party for Freedom (until 2026)
- Children: 1
- Occupation: Lawyer; politician

Annelotte Lammers (born 1993) is a Dutch lawyer and politician who was elected member of the House of Representatives in 2025 as a member of the Party for Freedom. In 2026, Lammers left the PVV parliamentary group along with six other MPs to found the Markuszower Group.

== Biography ==
Lammers was born in Zwolle in 1993, grew up in Hasselt (Overijssel) and followed second education in Zwartsluis. She previously worked at the Immigration and Naturalisation Service. She has described her work as motivating her interest in politics and was a PVV voter before joining the party as a candidate.

In her personal life Lammers has a daughter and is a non-denominational Christian.
