= Next Dutch general election =

- By May 2030
- All 150 seats in the House of Representatives; 76 seats needed for a majority
Party	Leader	Current seats
D66	Rob Jetten	26
VVD	Dilan Yeşilgöz	22
Pro	Jesse Klaver	20
PVV	Geert Wilders	19
CDA	Henri Bontenbal	18
JA21	Joost Eerdmans	9
FVD	Lidewij de Vos	7
BBB	Henk Vermeer	3
Denk	Stephan van Baarle	3
SGP	Chris Stoffer	3
PvdD	Christine Teunissen	3
CU	Mirjam Bikker	3
SP	Jimmy Dijk	3
50Plus	Jan Struijs	2
Volt	Laurens Dassen	1
Incumbent cabinet
Jetten cabinet D66–VVD–CDA

General elections are scheduled to be held in the Netherlands on 15 May 2030 to elect the members of the House of Representatives, but may be held at an earlier date if a snap election is called.

== Background ==
The 2025 Dutch general election resulted in losses for all parties in the Schoof cabinet. Democrats 66 (D66) became the largest party in the House of Representatives for the first time, winning 26 seats, the same number as the Party for Freedom (PVV), but receiving 29,668 more votes. GroenLinks (GL) and the Labour Party (PvdA) merged in 2026 to form Progressief Nederland (PRO).

== Electoral system ==
Eligible voters are Dutch nationals who are at least 18 years old on nomination day and have not been deprived of their right to vote following a criminal conviction. Electoral procedures are governed by the Dutch Electoral Act.

Elections for the House of Representatives are normally held every four years, unless a snap election is called. Regular general elections in the Netherlands are held in March. However, due to municipal elections already taking place in March 2030, general elections would instead be held in May 2030.

The 150 members of the House of Representatives are elected by semi-open list proportional representation. The number of seats per list is determined using the D'Hondt method. A list must receive a number of votes equal to or exceeding the Hare quota (1 full seat) in order to qualify for seat distribution, meaning there is an electoral threshold of 0.67%.

Voters have the option to cast a preferential vote. The seats won by a list are first allocated to the candidates who, in preferential votes, have received at least 25% of the Hare quota (effectively ¼ of a seat or 0.17% of the total votes), regardless of their placement on the electoral list. If multiple candidates from a list pass this threshold, their ordering is determined based on the number of votes received. Any remaining seats are allocated to candidates according to their position on the electoral list.

== Opinion polls ==

=== Seats ===
There are 150 seats in total, 76 seats are needed for a majority. Parties are denoted with a dash if no indication is given of their level in the polls.

Polling firm	Fieldwork date	Sample size	D66	PVV	VVD	PRO (Note: Presented before 13 June 2026 as GL–PvdA)	CDA	JA21	FvD	BBB	Denk	SGP	PvdD	CU	SP	50+	Volt	Others	Lead	Ref
Peil.nl	20 Nov 2026	–	14	22	12	31	13	18	10	1	3	4	5	3	5	5	4	0	9	
Ipsos I&O	17–18 Nov 2026	1,890	16	19	13	28	14	19	11	2	3	4	4	4	5	5	3	0	9	
Peil.nl	13 Nov 2026	–	14	21	14	32	12	16	11	1	3	4	5	3	5	5	4	0	11	
Peil.nl	6 Nov 2026	–	14	21	13	31	11	18	12	1	3	4	5	3	5	5	4	0	10	
Verian	23–26 Oct 2026	1,268	14	21	16	28	14	16	13	1	1	3	4	4	5	6	4	0	7	
Peil.nl	23 Oct 2026	–	16	19	12	30	11	20	12	2	3	3	5	3	5	5	4	0	10	
Ipsos I&O	12–14 Oct 2026	1,697	15	18	15	28	13	18	11	2	2	4	6	5	5	5	3	0	10	
Peil.nl	2 Oct 2026	–	18	19	12	29	12	20	13	2	3	3	4	3	4	5	3	0	9	
Verian	25–28 Sep 2026	1,255	17	20	18	28	14	15	10	1	3	4	4	4	4	5	3	0	8	
Peil.nl	12 Sep 2026	–	18	16	16	27	12	16	17	2	3	3	4	3	5	4	4	0	9	
Ipsos I&O	1–2 Sep 2026	1,649	20	17	20	26	14	14	12	2	2	4	5	3	5	4	2	0	6	
Peil.nl	29 Aug 2026	–	18	18	16	26	13	17	17	1	3	3	4	3	4	4	3	0	8	
Verian	21–24 Aug 2026	1,251	17	16	19	26	15	14	13	2	3	4	4	4	5	5	3	0	7	
Peil.nl	1 Aug 2026	–	18	18	16	24	13	18	18	1	3	3	4	3	4	4	3	0	6	
Ipsos I&O	10–13 Jul 2026	1,682	23	17	20	24	14	15	12	1	3	3	5	3	3	5	2	0	1	
Verian	26–29 Jun 2026	1,251	17	20	20	26	15	12	12	2	2	3	5	4	4	5	3	0	6	
Peil.nl	20 Jun 2026	–	19	17	17	25	13	18	17	1	3	3	4	3	3	4	3	0	6	
Ipsos I&O	12–15 Jun 2026	1,529	20	16	20	26	14	14	13	2	3	3	5	3	5	4	2	0	6	
	4 Jun 2026	Esther Ouwehand hands over leadership of the PvdD to Christine Teunissen																		
Verian	21–25 May 2026	1,232	17	21	23	25	15	11	10	2	4	4	5	3	4	4	2	0	2	
Peil.nl	23 May 2026	–	19	18	17	23	15	18	16	1	3	3	4	2	3	4	3	1 (Note: DNA: 1 seat)	4	
Ipsos I&O	8–11 May 2026	1,560	20	19	21	24	15	13	11	1	4	3	5	4	4	4	2	0	3	
Verian	24–27 Apr 2026	1,241	17	20	20	24	16	13	12	2	4	3	4	4	4	4	3	0	4	
Peil.nl	25 Apr 2026	–	22	17	16	22	16	17	15	1	3	3	4	2	3	4	2	3 (Note: DNA: 3 seats)	Tie	
Peil.nl	18 Apr 2026	–	20	19	17	23	16	17	16	1	3	3	4	2	3	4	2	0	3	
	17 Apr 2026	The Markuszower Group becomes a political party, founding De Nederlandse Alliantie																		
Ipsos I&O	10–13 Apr 2026	1,680	19	18	20	26	14	13	13	2	2	4	5	4	4	4	2	0	6	
Verian	27–30 Mar 2026	1,282	20	18	19	24	17	15	12	1	3	3	4	4	4	4	2	0	4	
Peil.nl	27 Mar 2026	–	22	17	17	22	18	16	16	1	3	3	4	2	3	4	2	0	Tie	
	18 Mar 2026	2026 Dutch municipal elections																		
Peil.nl	13 Mar 2026	–	25	17	18	23	15	14	14	1	3	3	4	3	4	4	2	0	2	
Ipsos I&O	6–9 Mar 2026	1,802	24	19	21	25	15	14	10	1	2	3	4	4	4	3	1	0	1	
Peil.nl	6 Mar 2026	–	27	15	18	21	17	13	15	1	3	3	4	3	4	4	2	0	6	
	23 Feb 2026	Mona Keijzer leaves the BBB and continues as an independent MP																		
	23 Feb 2026	The Jetten cabinet is sworn in																		
Verian	20–23 Feb 2026	1,319	22	21	23	22	14	12	10	3	3	3	4	3	5	3	2	0	1	
Peil.nl	21 Feb 2026	–	27	16	17	21	17	14	14	2	3	3	4	3	4	3	2	0	6	
	20 Feb 2026	Caroline van der Plas hands over leadership of the BBB to Henk Vermeer																		
Ipsos I&O	13–16 Feb 2026	1,802	25	20	20	22	15	13	9	3	3	3	4	3	4	4	2	0	3	
Peil.nl	8 Feb 2026	–	27	16	18	21	17	14	13	3	3	3	4	3	3	3	2	0	6	
Ipsos I&O	30 Jan – 2 Feb 2026	2,614	26	19	20	21	15	14	10	3	2	3	4	3	4	4	2	0	5	
Verian	23–26 Jan 2026	1,269	26	18	23	21	17	12	10	1	4	3	3	3	3	4	2	0	3	
Peil.nl	25 Jan 2026	–	27	17	20	20	18	11	14	3	3	3	4	3	3	3	1	0	7	
	20 Jan 2026	Seven MPs leave the PVV to form the Markuszower Group																		
Ipsos I&O	16–19 Jan 2026	2,260	28	23	20	19	16	11	8	2	3	3	5	4	3	3	2	0	5	
Peil.nl	17 Jan 2026	–	28	17	21	20	18	11	14	3	3	3	3	3	3	2	1	0	7	
Peil.nl	19 Dec 2025	–	28	20	22	20	17	10	12	3	3	3	3	3	3	2	1	0	6	
Ipsos I&O	12–15 Dec 2025	1,958	28	24	21	21	17	10	7	2	2	4	3	3	3	3	2	0	4	
Peil.nl	29 Nov 2025	–	28	23	22	19	17	9	10	4	3	3	3	3	3	2	1	0	5	
Verian	21–24 Nov 2025	1,550	31	22	20	16	20	9	10	3	3	4	3	2	3	3	1	0	9	
Peil.nl	22 Nov 2025	–	28	23	23	18	17	9	10	4	3	3	3	3	3	2	1	0	5	
Peil.nl	7 Nov 2025	–	28	24	22	18	18	10	9	3	3	3	3	3	3	2	1	0	4	
	3 Nov 2025	Jesse Klaver succeeds Frans Timmermans as leader of GL–PvdA																		
2025 election	29 Oct 2025	–	26	26	22	20	18	9	7	4	3	3	3	3	3	2	1	0	Tie	

=== Vote share ===
Polling firm	Fieldwork date	Sample size	D66	PVV	VVD	PRO	CDA	JA21	FvD	BBB	Denk	SGP	PvdD	CU	SP	50+	Volt	Others	Lead	Ref
Ipsos I&O	17–18 Nov 2026	1,890	10.3%	12.5%	8.4%	18.3%	9.5%	12.6%	7.3%	1.5%	1.9%	2.8%	3.2%	2.6%	3.2%	3.4%	2.4%	0.0% (Note: DNA: 0.0%)	5.7%	
Verian	23–26 Oct 2026	1,286	9.4%	13.4%	10.3%	18.0%	9.3%	10.4%	8.8%	0.9%	1.2%	2.3%	3.0%	3.1%	3.2%	3.8%	2.8%	–	4.6%	
Ipsos I&O	12–14 Oct 2026	1,697	10.1%	11.7%	9.9%	18.3%	8.3%	12.0%	7.1%	1.4%	1.9%	2.6%	4.4%	3.2%	3.5%	3.4%	1.9%	0.2% (Note: DNA: 0.2%)	6.3%	
Verian	25–28 Sep 2026	1,255	11.3%	12.8%	11.5%	17.8%	9.2%	9.6%	6.9%	1.3%	2.3%	2.6%	2.9%	3.0%	3.0%	3.7%	2.3%	–	5.0%	
Ipsos I&O	1–2 Sep 2026	1,649	13.2%	11.1%	12.7%	16.6%	9.2%	9.4%	7.9%	1.5%	1.5%	2.6%	3.6%	2.5%	3.6%	2.8%	1.6%	0.2%	3.4%	
Verian	21–24 Aug 2026	1,284	11.3%	10.8%	12.5%	16.6%	10.0%	9.1%	8.8%	1.4%	1.9%	2.7%	3.0%	2.7%	3.3%	3.4%	2.5%	–	4.1%	
Ipsos I&O	10–13 Jul 2026	1,628	14.9%	11.3%	12.7%	15.4%	8.8%	9.8%	7.9%	1.2%	2.4%	2.4%	3.4%	2.3%	2.5%	3.3%	1.3%	0.4% (Note: DNA: 0.4%)	0.5%	
Verian	26–29 Jun 2026	1,251	10.9%	12.9%	13.1%	17.1%	10.1%	8.4%	8.2%	1.3%	1.9%	2.1%	3.3%	2.7%	2.7%	3.3%	2.0%	–	4.0%	
Ipsos I&O	12–15 Jun 2026	1,529	13.0%	10.2%	13.3%	16.5%	9.3%	9.4%	8.5%	1.3%	2.1%	2.5%	3.6%	2.3%	3.5%	2.9%	1.6%	–	3.2%	
Verian	21–25 May 2026	1,232	11.1%	13.5%	14.8%	16.3%	10.3%	7.7%	6.5%	1.3%	2.7%	2.7%	3.3%	2.1%	2.9%	2.9%	1.9%	–	1.5%	
Ipsos I&O	8–11 May 2026	1,560	12.9%	12.6%	13.5%	15.4%	9.8%	8.5%	7.2%	0.8%	2.6%	2.4%	3.7%	2.7%	3.1%	3.0%	1.6%	–	1.9%	
Verian	24–27 Apr 2026	1,241	11.2%	13.0%	12.9%	15.9%	10.5%	8.3%	7.9%	1.3%	2.6%	2.5%	2.9%	3.0%	3.0%	3.1%	2.0%	–	2.9%	
Ipsos I&O	10–13 Apr 2026	1,680	12.6%	12.1%	13.2%	16.7%	9.1%	8.5%	8.5%	1.4%	1.6%	2.7%	2.9%	2.6%	3.4%	3.1%	1.7%	–	3.5%	
Verian	27–30 Mar 2026	1,282	13.0%	11.5%	12.0%	15.3%	11.3%	9.8%	8.1%	1.2%	2.1%	2.4%	3.0%	3.1%	2.7%	2.6%	1.6%	–	2.3%	
Ipsos I&O	6–9 Mar 2026	1,802	15.2%	12.1%	13.6%	15.9%	9.9%	9.5%	6.8%	0.9%	1.8%	2.5%	2.6%	2.6%	3.0%	2.4%	1.1%	–	0.7%	
Verian	20–23 Feb 2026	1,319	13.8%	13.6%	14.6%	14.5%	8.9%	8.1%	6.8%	2.1%	2.2%	2.3%	2.8%	2.4%	3.5%	2.9%	1.5%	–	0.1%	
Verian	23–26 Jan 2026	1,269	17.0%	11.7%	14.7%	13.7%	11.0%	7.8%	6.9%	1.2%	2.6%	1.9%	2.3%	2.5%	2.3%	3.1%	1.4%	–	2.3%	
Verian	21–24 Nov 2025	1,550	20.3%	14.3%	12.8%	10.5%	13.3%	6.0%	6.7%	2.0%	2.3%	2.6%	2.0%	1.9%	2.3%	2.0%	0.9%	–	6.0%	
2025 election	29 Oct 2025	–	16.94%	16.66%	14.24%	12.79%	11.79%	5.95%	4.54%	2.65%	2.37%	2.25%	2.08%	1.90%	1.89%	1.43%	1.10%	1.41%	0.28%	
