= Shanna Schilder =

Dutch politician

Member of the House of Representatives
- Incumbent
- Assumed office 12 November 2025

Personal details
- Born: 31 January 1988 (age 38) Volendam, Netherlands
- Party: DNA (since 2026)
- Other political affiliations: PVV (2025–2026)
- Education: Vrije Universiteit Amsterdam
- Occupation: Jurist; politician

J.M.M. "Shanna" Schilder (born 31 January 1988) is a Dutch politician, jurist, and former civil servant, who has served as a member of the Member of the House of Representatives since 2025.

Schilder studied law at the Vrije Universiteit Amsterdam. She moved to Curaçao, where she served as head of the resident registration department of the Ministry of Planning and Administration of Curaçao between 2023 and 2025. For the 2025 Dutch general election she was placed third on the PVV's list and was elected to parliament. In 2026, Schilder left the PVV parliamentary group along with six other MPs to found the Markuszower Group. and joined the related party De Nederlandse Alliantie (DNA).
