= Historic composition of the Senate of the Netherlands =

The historic composition of the Senate gives an overview of the composition of the upper house of the Dutch parliament (Dutch: Eerste Kamer, "First Chamber"). It shows the composition after the indirect elections by the provincial councils.

Party	1922	1923	1926	1929	1932	1935	1937	1946	1951	1952	1955	1956*	1959	1963	1966	1969	1971	1974	1977	1980	1981	1983	1986	1987	1991	1995	1999	2003	2007	2011	2015	2019	Party
RKSP	21	16	16	16	16	16	16																										RKSP
KVP								17	16	17	17	25	26	26	25	24	22	16															KVP
ARP	14	8	7	6	6	6	7	7	7	7	7	8	8	7	7	7	7	6															ARP
CHU	7	7	7	7	7	7	6	5	6	6	6	8	8	7	7	8	7	7															CHU
CDA																			24	27	28	26	26	26	27	19	20	23	21	11	12	9	CDA
GPV																			1	1		1	1	1	1	1							GPV
RPF																						1	1	1	1	1							RPF
CU																											4	2	4	2	3	4	CU
SGP												1					1	1	1	1	1	2	2	1	2	2	2	2	2	1	2	2	SGP
LPF																												1					LPF
LSP	1	5	6	6	6	5	3																										LSP
VDB	4	3	3	4	4	3	2																										VDB
PvdV								3																									PvdV
VVD									4	4	4	7	8	7	8	8	8	12	15	13	12	17	16	12	12	23	19	15	14	16	13	12	VVD
D66																3	6	3		2	4	6	6	5	12	7	4	3	2	5	10	7	D66
SDAP	3	11	11	11	11	11	12																										SDAP
PvdA								14	14	14	14	22	23	25	22	20	18	21	25	26	28	17	17	26	16	14	15	19	14	14	8	6	PvdA
PPR																1	2	4	5	3	1	1	2	1									PPR
PSP														2	3		1		1	1		2	2	1									PSP
CPN								4	3	2	2	4	2	1	1	1	3	4	2	1	1	2	2	1									CPN
GL																									4	4	8	5	4	5	4	8	GL
SP																										1	2	4	12	8	9	4	SP
NSB						2	4																										NSB
BP															2	3		1	1														BP
AOV																										2							AOV
OSF																										1	1	1	1	1	1	1	OSF
PvdD																													1	1	2	3	PvdD
PVV																														10	9	5	PVV
50+																														1	2	2	50+
FVD																																12	FVD
Total	50	50	50	50	50	50	50	50	50	50	50	75	75	75	75	75	75	75	75	75	75	75	75	75	75	75	75	75	75	75	75	75	Total
Party	1922	1923	1926	1929	1932	1935	1937	1946	1951	1952	1955	1956*	1959	1963	1966	1969	1971	1974	1977	1980	1981	1983	1986	1987	1991	1995	1999	2003	2007	2011	2015	2019	Party

* Since 1956 the Senate has had 75 seats.

Composition of the Dutch Senate since 1946.

== See also ==
- List of cabinets of the Netherlands
- List of prime ministers of the Netherlands
- Historic composition of the House of Representatives
