= René Claassen =

Dutch politician (born 1971)

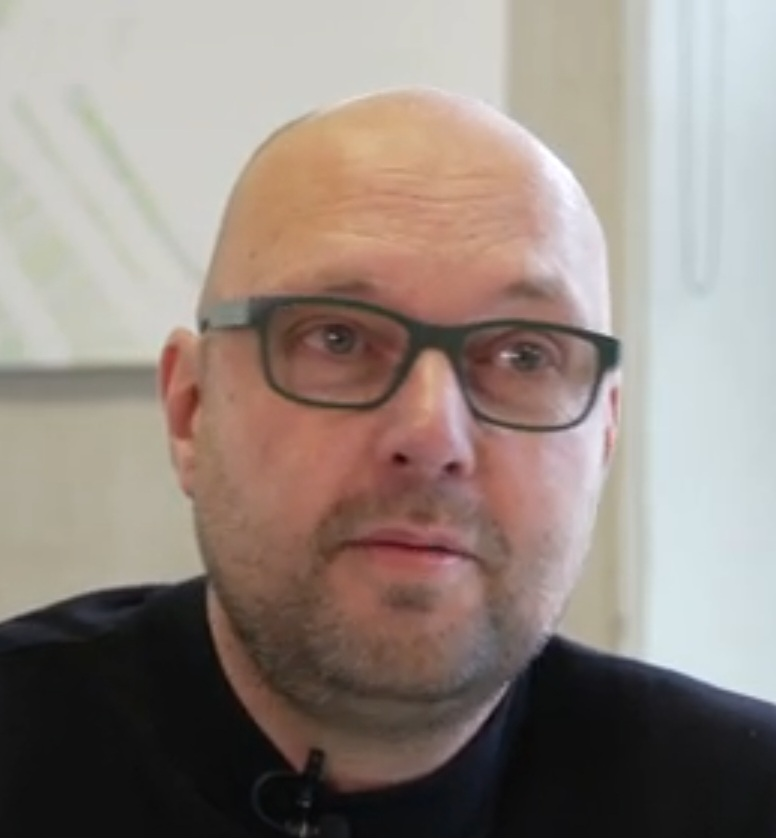
- René Claassen in 2023

Member of the House of Representatives
- Incumbent
- Assumed office 6 December 2023
- Parliamentary group: PVV (2023–2026); Markuszower Group (since 2026)

Municipal councilor of Landgraaf
- In office 30 March 2022 – 6 December 2023

Member of the Provincial Council of Limburg
- In office 28 March 2019 – 6 December 2023

Personal details
- Born: René Adrianus Bernardus Claassen; 13 July 1971 (age 55) Heerlen, Netherlands
- Party: PVV (until 2026); DNA (since 2026)
- Education: Maastricht University (MSc)
- Occupation: Politician

René Adrianus Bernardus Claassen (born 13 July 1971) is a Dutch politician. Representing the Party for Freedom (PVV), he was a member of the Provincial Council of Limburg starting in 2019, and he has served as a member of the House of Representatives since the 2023 Dutch general election. In 2026, Claassen left the PVV parliamentary group along with six other MPs to found the Markuszower Group.

== Early life and healthcare career ==
Claassen was born in Heerlen's Zuyderland Hospital on 13 July 1971. His father was a member of the Labour Party and a senior union leader of Abvakabo. Claassen was raised Catholic, but he has said that he was "cured of Roman Catholicism" after visiting Vatican City at age seventeen, concluding it was a charade.

Claassen completed his nursing training in the late 1980s, and he worked as a hospital nurse for over twenty years, successively in a pediatric ward and an intensive care unit. He was employed by the Zuyderland Hospital for most of that period. He switched careers in 2008 and became a healthcare educator and manager at the Zuyd University of Applied Sciences. He also completed a master's degree in applied science at Maastricht University.

== Political career ==
In a 2024 interview, Claassen described that he was inspired by the rise of right-wing politician Pim Fortuyn. Poverty was rising in Heerlen as a result of the closure of coal mines in the region, and Claassen believe those issues could only be solved by the political right. He was elected to the Provincial Council of Limburg in March 2019 and to the municipal council of Landgraaf in March 2022. He stepped down from both positions in December 2023.

During the 2023 Dutch general election, he was elected to the House of Representatives as the PVV's sixth candidate, and he became the party's spokesperson for curative healthcare. When the House was considering to expand a pilot program to legalize the cultivation and supply of cannabis, Claassen instead proposed to put it on hold. His motion was not supported by a majority. Claassen introduced two motions in an attempt to prevent the closure of the emergency department and the intensive care unit of the Zuyderland Hospital. Healthcare minister Fleur Agema (PVV) advised against them, and she was unable to keep the departments open.

On 20 January 2026, Claassen left the PVV with six other MPs over disagreements about Geert Wilders's leadership and the party's direction. They formed the Markuszower Group.

=== House committee memberships ===
- Committee for Finance
- Committee for Health, Welfare and Sport
- Committee for European Affairs (vice chair)
- Committee for Agriculture, Fisheries, Food Security and Nature

== Electoral history ==
Electoral history of René Claassen
Year	Body	Party	Pos.	Votes	Result		Ref.
Year	Body	Party	Pos.	Votes	Party seats	Individual	Ref.
2021	House of Representatives	Party for Freedom	31	657	17	Lost	
2023	House of Representatives	Party for Freedom	6	3,764	37	Won	
2025	House of Representatives	Party for Freedom	7	1,919	26	Won	
