= Tamara ten Hove =

Dutch politician (born 1981)

Member of the House of Representatives
- Incumbent
- Assumed office 12 November 2025

Personal details
- Born: 10 November 1981 (age 44) Zwolle, Netherlands
- Party: DNA (since 2026)
- Other political affiliations: Party for Freedom (until 2026)

Tamara ten Hove (born 10 November 1981) is a Dutch politician. She has served in the House of Representatives since November 2025, after she was elected on behalf of the right-wing populist Party for Freedom (PVV). In 2026, Ten Hove left the PVV parliamentary group along with six other MPs to found the Markuszower Group.

== See also ==
- List of members of the House of Representatives of the Netherlands, 2025–present
