= Hidde Heutink =

Dutch politician (born 1993)

Member of the House of Representatives
- Incumbent
- Assumed office 6 December 2023

Member of the Provincial Council of Overijssel
- In office 2017–2019

Personal details
- Born: 7 January 1993 (age 33) Oldenzaal, Netherlands
- Party: DNA (since 2026)
- Other political affiliations: Party for Freedom (until 2026)
- Occupation: Politician

Hidde Derek Heutink (born 1 July 1993) is a Dutch politician. He was elected to the House of Representatives in 2013 on behalf of the Party for Freedom (PVV). In 2026, Heutink left the PVV parliamentary group along with six other MPs to found the Markuszower Group.

== Biography ==
Heutink was born in 1993 in Oldenzaal before he moved to Enschede. Prior to entering politics he studied information technology management at the ROC van Twente and worked in the IT sector.

He became a member of the Provincial Council of Overijssel in 2017 as a substitute to replace fellow PVV politician Edgar Mulder. Heutink remained in the Provincial Council until 2019. He was also a municipal councillor in Almelo for a short time in 2018 before working as a policy officer for the PVV in the House of Representatives. Heutink has been a municipal councillor of Enschede since 2022.

In the 2023 general election he was elected to the House of Representatives. In Parliament he focuses on matters related to public infrastructure and water management. Heutink announced his support for a minimum age to ride an electric fatbike in 2024, days after Minister Barry Madlener (PVV) voiced his opposition, and a motion by VVD and NSC that also called for a helmet requirement was ultimately carried with the support of the PVV.

On 20 January 2026, Heutink left the PVV with six other MPs over disagreements about Geert Wilders's leadership and the party's direction. They formed the Markuszower Group. Heutink had registered the domain nederlandsevrijheidsalliantie.nl on 16 January, which was confirmed by the newly formed group.

=== House committee assignments ===
- Committee for Economic Affairs
- Committee for Infrastructure and Water Management
- Committee for Housing and Spatial Planning
- Committee for Climate Policy and Green Growth

== Electoral history ==
Electoral history of Hidde Heutink
Year	Body	Party	Pos.	Votes	Result		Ref.
Year	Body	Party	Pos.	Votes	Party seats	Individual	Ref.
2021	House of Representatives	Party for Freedom	26	614	17	Lost	
2023	House of Representatives	Party for Freedom	36	846	37	Won	
2025	House of Representatives	Party for Freedom	15	609	26	Won	
