= Nicole Moinat =

Dutch politician (born 1984)

Member of the House of Representatives
- Incumbent
- Assumed office 12 November 2025

Personal details
- Born: 6 December 1984 Purmerend, Netherlands
- Party: DNA (since 2026)
- Other political affiliations: Party for Freedom (until 2026)

Nicole Moinat (born 6 December 1984) is a Dutch politician who has served as a member of the House of Representatives since 2025. In the 2025 Dutch general election, she was 17th on the candidate list of the Party for Freedom (PVV). In 2026, Moinat left the PVV parliamentary group along with six other MPs to found the Markuszower Group.

== Biography ==
Moinat was trained as a healthcare worker. Since 2023, she has been the director of a maintenance and installation company.

=== Municipal council ===
In the Dutch municipal elections of 2018, she was on the candidate list in Purmerend for the PVV. During the campaign, the candidate list split into two groups. The PVV secured three seats, allowing Moinat to join the municipal council on 29 March 2018. Within the group, she found herself opposed to her two colleagues, with whom she had little contact. Her substantive contributions in the field of healthcare were appreciated by the PVV supporters.

On 14 December 2018, her colleagues expelled her from the group, citing "a serious lack of trust in Moinat," despite mediation by the national PVV. According to her party colleagues, Moinat refused to engage in dialogue with the moderate Islamic community. However, Moinat continued to speak on behalf of the PVV and registered herself as the group leader. She received support from Ilse Bezaan, the PVV leader in the Provincial Council of North Holland, and shortly afterward from the national party leader Geert Wilders. Ultimately, on 10 January 2019, the PVV group split into PVV-Moinat and PVV-Soenjoto/Van Dongen, leaving her as a one-person group. On 27 May of that year, PVV-Moinat was designated as the official PVV group.

=== National politics ===
In July 2024, Moinat became the political assistant to the State Secretary for Long-Term and Social Care Vicky Maeijer and the deputy political assistant to the Minister of Health, Welfare and Sport Fleur Agema. After the fall of the cabinet, she became a policy officer for the PVV's House of Representatives group. She was seventeenth on the PVV's candidate list for the general election of 2025, which resulted in her election, and she joined the House of Representatives on 12 November 2025.

On 20 January 2026, Moinat split from the PVV together with six other group members to form the Markuszower Group. She wanted not only to fiercely oppose but also to achieve results. She had expected more social cohesion within the parliamentary group. Additionally, she believed the party had too narrow a focus due to its emphasis on Islam.

== Electoral history ==
Electoral history of Nicole Moinat
Year	Body	Party	Pos.	Votes	Result		Ref.
Year	Body	Party	Pos.	Votes	Party seats	Individual	Ref.
2018	Purmerend Municipal Council	PVV	2	216		Won	
2019	Provincial Council of North Holland	PVV	13	2,150	3 / 55	Lost	
2021	House of Representatives	PVV	23	871	17 / 150	Lost	
2021	Purmerend Municipal Council	PVV	1			Won	
2023	Provincial Council of North Holland	PVV	9	2,411	3 / 55	Lost	
2023	Senate	PVV	10	0	4 / 75	Lost	
2025	House of Representatives	PVV	17	790	26 / 150	Won	
