= Rudy Andeweg =

Dutch author, university teacher and writer (1952–2024)

Rudolf Bastiaan "Rudy" Andeweg (28 February 1952 – 28 June 2024) was a professor of empirical political science at Leiden University. He wrote on political psychology, voting behavior, political elites, political leadership, comparative politics and political institutions.

== Life ==
Andeweg was born on 28 February 1952 in Leiden. In 1974 he obtained a scholarship to the Institute of International Education. He studied law at Leiden University and graduated in 1975, and he obtained an MA in political science at the University of Michigan the next year. In 1982 he earned his PhD from Leiden University with a thesis titled: "Dutch Voters Adrift; on explanations of electoral change (1963-1977)". Andeweg became professor of political science with a teaching assignment in empirical and Dutch political science six years later, in 1988. Andeweg was a fellow at the Netherlands Institute for Advanced Study in the Humanities and Social Sciences (NIAS) between 2002 and 2003. In 2018 Andeweg took up emeritus status.

Andeweg was seen as one of the foremost Dutch political scientists on Dutch cabinet formation, voting behaviour and bureaucratization. He was seen as the principle force behind Dutch parliamentary research. Andeweg also performed research into the functioning of the Council of Ministers of the Netherlands. In 2017 Andeweg became member of the Dutch Electoral Council, the next year he became deputy chair. He served in this position until his death. Andeweg was described as a "hardworking Calvinist from Katwijk", working very structured and having others and himself obey a tight schedule.

Andeweg became member of the Royal Netherlands Academy of Arts and Sciences in 2006.

Andeweg was married and had two children. He died on 28 June 2024 in Leiden, aged 72, after a short period of being ill.

== Decorations ==
- Netherlands
  - Officer in the Order of Orange-Nassau (18 May 2018)
