= Gidi Markuszower =

Israeli–Dutch politician

- גידי מרקוסזוור
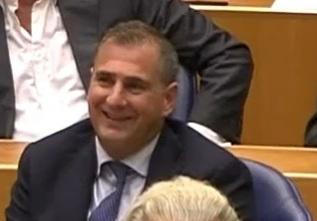
- Markuszower in 2019

Leader of the Markuszower Group in the House of Representatives
- Incumbent
- Assumed office 20 January 2026

Member of the House of Representatives
- Incumbent
- Assumed office 21 March 2017
- Parliamentary group: PVV (2017–2026); Markuszower Group (since 2026)

Member of the Senate
- In office 9 June 2015 – 21 March 2017
- Parliamentary group: PVV

Personal details
- Born: Gideon Markuszower; 27 October 1977 (age 48) Tel Aviv, Israel
- Citizenship: Israel; Netherlands
- Party: Likud (1997–2015); VVD (2000–2006); PVV (2010–2026); DNA (since 2026)
- Education: Hebrew University of Jerusalem; Vrije Universiteit Amsterdam; University of Amsterdam
- Occupation: Politician; corporate director; political consultant

Gideon "Gidi" Markuszower (Hebrew: גידי מרקוסזוור; born 27 October 1977) is an Israeli–Dutch politician. He became a senator on 9 June 2015 on behalf of the right-wing populist Party for Freedom (PVV). In the 2017 Dutch general election, he was elected to the House of Representatives and gave up his Senate seat. On 20 January 2026, he left the PVV parliamentary group along with six other MPs to found the independent Markuszower Group.

== Political career ==
He was a spokesperson for Likud Netherlands between 1999 and 2005 and board member between 1999 and 2015, when he resigned from the party to become a member of the Senate. He also served as political advisor to Member of Parliament Anton van Schijndel (VVD) until 1 December 2006.

Markuszower was arrested in 2008 for illegally carrying a firearm, while performing voluntary security work at a celebration of Israel's 60-year existence. He stated that he had violated transportation restrictions of his firearms license, but charges were later dropped by the prosecution.

Markuszower was placed on the PVV list for the 2010 general election. However, he withdrew himself as a candidate after party leader Geert Wilders had been informed of findings by the General Intelligence and Security Service (AIVD). It had concluded that Markuszower was involved in an organisation that had shared information with "a foreign power" and that he had been in contact with a foreign intelligence agency, suspected to be the Israeli Mossad.

In the 2015 Dutch Senate election Markuszower, who was in fifth place on the PVV's candidate list, was elected to the Senate. He took his seat on 9 June 2015. He became the chairman for committee for Immigration and Asylum, and for Justice and Home Affairs.

In 2017, Markuszower was elected to the House of Representative, after being placed fourth on the PVV's candidate list. As a consequence he stepped down from the Senate. In November 2017, Markuszower called for the general public to be able to appoint judges, a task for House of Representatives and council members. In 2018, Markuszower took over the co-defence of a private member's bill from Geert Wilders concerning the detention of suspects in the interest of national security. He was supported by Machiel de Graaf and Sietse Fritsma.

In 2021, Markuszower referred to the Dutch immigration policy as a "major crime against the Dutch people," for which those politicians responsible should be tried by a tribunal. When Ukrainian refugees entered the Netherlands following Russia's invasion of the country, he complained that the Netherlands was paying for their rent and utilities. Markuszower has voiced his support of a proposed Israeli annexation of the West Bank, and he has met with Yossi Dagan, chair of the Shomron Regional Council. He has advocated ending money transfers of the European Union to Palestinian organisations in the West Bank.

Markuszower received a third House term in the 2023 general election, and he has served as the PVV's spokesperson for migration, asylum, and terrorism before changing to European affairs. He was selected by Wilders to serve as Minister of Asylum and Migration and as First Deputy Prime Minister in June 2024 as part of the Schoof cabinet, but Wilders withdrew his nomination shortly after due to the results of his background check by the AIVD. Markuszower called his situation Kafkaesque.

On 20 January 2026, Markuszower left the PVV with six other MPs over disagreements about Wilders's leadership and the party's direction. They formed the Markuszower Group, later renamed as De Nederlandse Alliantie (DNA; 'The Dutch Alliance').

On 15 May 2026 Markuszower said in an interview with Bob Sneevliet of media platform Left Laser that Palestinian refugees should be prevented from entering the Netherlands to apply for asylum, "with maximum violence, maybe even more violence than from where they came." This sparked outrage in the country and led to a report being filed for incitement to violence.

== Personal life ==
Markuszower is a descendant of a prominent Jewish family that held many administrative positions within the Jewish community in the Netherlands. His father was chairman of Jewish Special Education for many years, and his brother was chairman of the Nieuw Israëlitisch Weekblad. Markuszower has family in Israel and visits the country often. He speaks fluent Hebrew.

== Electoral history ==
Electoral history of Gidi Markuszower
Year	Body	Party	Pos.	Votes	Result		Ref.
Year	Body	Party	Pos.	Votes	Party seats	Individual	Ref.
2015	Senate	Party for Freedom	5	502 (Note: Weighted votes)	9	Won	
2017	House of Representatives	Party for Freedom	4	1,101	20	Won	
2021	House of Representatives	Party for Freedom	3	1,245	17	Won	
2023	House of Representatives	Party for Freedom	4	2,845	37	Won	
2025	House of Representatives	Party for Freedom	5	1,738	26	Won	
