= Arie Griffioen =

Dutch politician

Member of the Senate
- Incumbent
- Assumed office 13 June 2023

Personal details
- Born: 26 September 1953 (age 73) Abcoude, Netherlands
- Party: BBB (until 2025); D66 (since 2025)
- Other political affiliations: Zandvoort Echt Eén (ZEE) (2021–2022)
- Education: Vrije Universiteit Amsterdam

Arie Griffioen (born 26 September 1953) is a Dutch politician and chartered accountant. Since 13 June 2023, he has been a member of the Dutch Senate. he has represented Democrats 66 (D66) since 28 November 2025, having previously left the Farmer-Citizen Movement (BBB) over disagreements with the BBB's right-wing political course. Griffioen previously served as chairman of the local political party Zandvoort Echt Eén (ZEE) from November 2021 to March 2022.

== Early life ==
Arie Griffioen was born on 26 September 1953 in Abcoude, where he was raised as a member of the Reformed Churches in the Netherlands. He studied business economics, initially at an Amsterdam college from 1972 to 1975 and later also studied business economics and accounting at the Vrije Universiteit Amsterdam from 1975 to 1985. In the subsequent decades, Griffioen worked as a chartered accountant at several different companies, including at KPN and PriceWaterhouseCoopers, before becoming a freelance accountant in 2013.

== Political career ==
=== Local politics ===
In 2021, Griffioen was one of the founders of Zandvoort Echt Één (ZEE), a local political party in Zandvoort, and became its chairman. The party won a single seat in the March 2022 municipal elections. In accordance with electoral law, this seat was then allocated to ZEE lead candidate Mirko Gerrits. Griffioen, along with several other party members, felt that Gerrits should give up the seat in order for Griffioen, the second candidate on the list, to join the municipal council. He also announced via a press release that Gerrits had been expelled from the party by the board. This statement turned out to be false, and Gerrits did not give up the seat, leading to Griffioen subsequently being removed from the ZEE executive board and leaving the party along with four others.

=== Farmer-Citizen Movement (BBB) ===
Griffioen was number 7 on the electoral list of the Farmer-Citizen Movement (BBB) for the March 2003 Provincial Council elections in North Holland. Although he was elected, Griffioen decided not to take up his seat in the Provincial Council of North Holland. Griffioen became a member of the Senate on 13 June 2023. In the Senate, Griffioen is vice-chair of the committee on Immigration and Asylum.

=== D66 ===
On 28 November 2025, Griffioen left the BBB and became a member of Democrats 66 (D66). In a letter to Senate President Mei Li Vos, he stated that he no longer identified with the political course of BBB, noting the BBB's opposition to the Dispersal Act (Spreidingswet), its intention to criminalize illegally staying in the Netherlands and banning assistance to rejected asylum seekers, as well as the party's stance on the Gaza war as the main reasons for him to leave the party. He took his seat with him, leaving BBB with twelve seats in the Senate.
