= De Nederlandse Alliantie =

Dutch political party established in 2026

The Dutch Alliance De Nederlandse Alliantie
- Abbreviation: DNA
- Leader: Gidi Markuszower
- Founder: Gidi Markuszower
- Founded: 17 April 2026; 6 months ago
- Split from: Party for Freedom
- Headquarters: Prinses Irenestraat 6, The Hague
- Ideology: Right-wing populism Conservative liberalism
- Political position: Right-wing
- Colours: Blue-grey; Red; Blue
- House of Representatives (Note: As the Markuszower Group.): 7 / 150

Website
- www.denederlandsealliantie.nl

De Nederlandse Alliantie (lit. 'The Dutch Alliance'; abbreviated DNA) is a right-wing populist party in the Netherlands, founded on 17 April 2026 by Gidi Markuszower. He and six other MPs left the Party for Freedom (PVV) group in the House of Representatives on 20 January 2026 after a dispute with PVV leader Geert Wilders. The breakaway MPs then formed their own parliamentary group, officially named the Markuszower Group (Dutch: Groep Markuszower).

== History ==
=== Split from the PVV ===
The Markuszower Group split from the Party for Freedom (PVV) in January 2026. This was prompted by an internal conflict within the PVV parliamentary group over its political course, party organisation, and the way in which parliamentary decisions were made.

During a group meeting on 20 January 2026, seven of the 26 PVV members of parliament (MPs) criticised the party leadership's strategy. They sought to discuss the disappointing results in the 2025 general election and declining poll numbers, and argued that there was insufficient room within the parliamentary group for substantive debate and decision-making. According to the MPs involved, this made a change of course impossible.

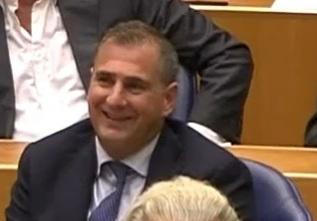
Founder and leader of the organization, Markuszower, in 2019

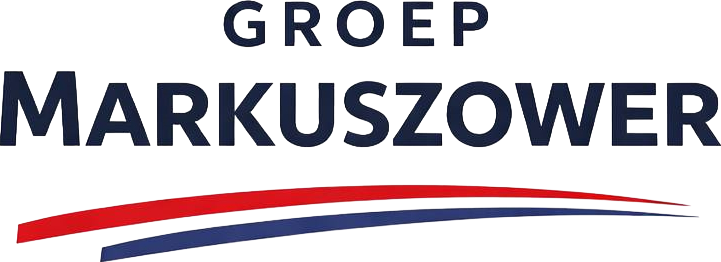
Logo used by the Markuszower Group until April 2026

The splitting members stated that the PVV was achieving too few concrete results for its voters. They advocated a more constructive parliamentary strategy, including actively seeking majorities and cooperation with other parties in the House of Representatives. They also called for a broader political profile, arguing that the party's focus had become too narrow.

Another point of contention concerned the PVV's internal organisation. Formally, party founder and leader Geert Wilders is the PVV's only member. The departing MPs expressed concern that this structure could jeopardize the party's continuity, particularly in light of proposals to ban political parties without members. They argued for greater internal democratic participation and broader involvement within the party structure.

Although the MPs expressed appreciation for Wilders's role in founding and developing the PVV, they concluded they could no longer fulfil their parliamentary mandate within the existing group. Therefore, they left the PVV group and continued together as the Markuszower Group. The new group stated its intention to represent its voters more effectively and did not rule out establishing an independent political party in the future. The group briefly used the name Nederlandse Vrijheids Alliantie (lit. 'Dutch Freedom Alliance') as a working title for a prospective party.

=== Establishment of DNA ===
On 20 April 2026, three months after the split from the PVV, Markuszower announced that he had founded a new political party, named De Nederlandse Alliantie, on 17 April 2026. It was also revealed that former People's Party for Freedom and Democracy (VVD), Trots op Nederland, and Hart voor Den Haag politician Rita Verdonk had joined the party as a coach and adviser. The party intends to participate in the 2027 provincial elections.

In June 2026, a request by the Markuszower Group to officially rename its parliamentary faction to "De Nederlandse Alliantie" was rejected.

=== Call for violence against Palestinian asylum seekers ===
In May 2026, controversy arose after party leader Gidi Markuszower made statements about Palestinian asylum seekers from Gaza in an interview with the activist media platform Left Laser. Markuszower stated that Palestinian asylum seekers should be stopped at the border with "maximum violence" and argued that Palestinians from Gaza should not come to Europe.

Following the statements, The Rights Forum announced that it would file a criminal complaint, arguing that the remarks incited violence against Palestinians. The organization described the statements as "morally reprehensible".

== Members ==
=== House of Representatives ===
- Gidi Markuszower (leader)
- René Claassen
- Hidde Heutink
- Tamara ten Hove
- Annelotte Lammers
- Nicole Moinat
- Shanna Schilder
