= House of Representatives (Netherlands) =

Lower house of the States General

Coordinates: 52°4′47″N 4°18′53″E

House of Representatives Tweede Kamer der Staten-Generaal
- States General of the Netherlands

Type
- Type: Lower house

Leadership
- Speaker: Thom van Campen, VVD since 18 November 2025
- First Deputy Speaker: Wieke Paulusma, D66 since 20 November 2025
- Second Deputy Speaker: Geert Wilders, PVV since 20 November 2025

Structure
- Seats: 150
- Political groups: Government (Jetten cabinet) (66): D66 (26); VVD (22); CDA (18); Opposition (84): PRO (20); PVV (19); JA21 (9); FvD (7); Markuszower Group (7); SP (3); PvdD (3); BBB (3); CU (3); SGP (3); DENK (3); 50PLUS (2); Volt (1); Keijzer Group (1)

Elections
- Voting system: Open party-list proportional representation (D'Hondt method)
- Last election: 29 October 2025
- Next election: By May 2030

Meeting place
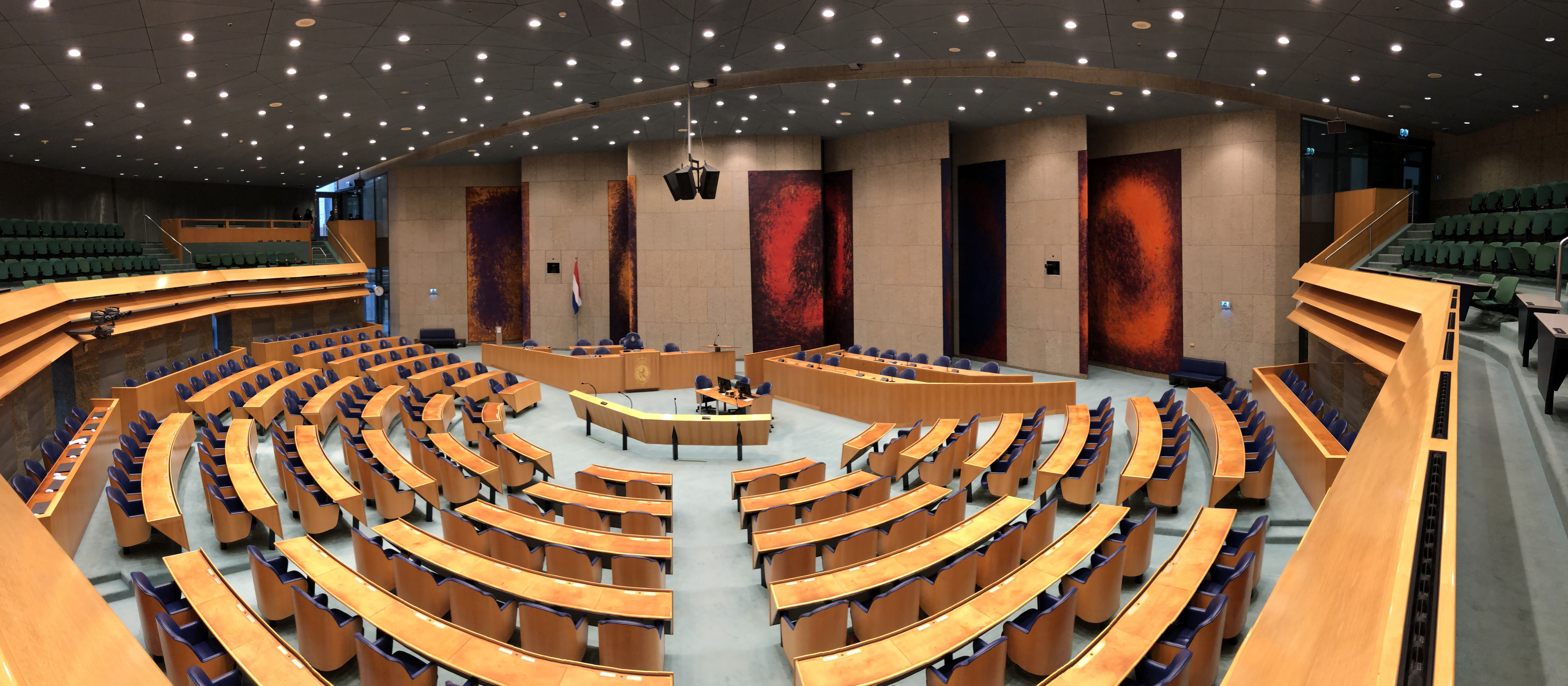
- Binnenhof, The Hague (closed due to ongoing renovations)
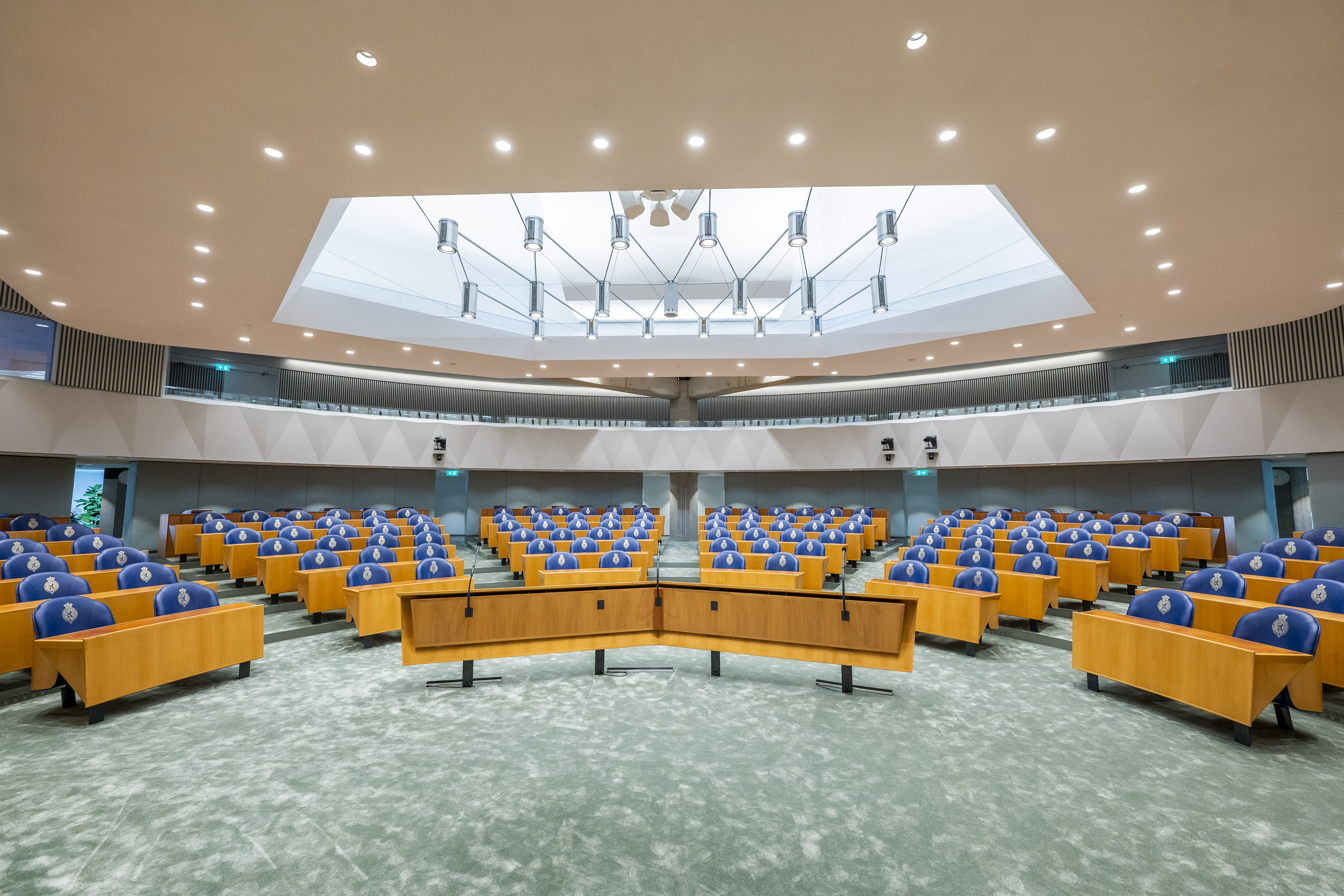
- Bezuidenhoutseweg 67, The Hague (temporary)

Website
- www.houseofrepresentatives.nl

The House of Representatives (Dutch: Tweede Kamer der Staten-Generaal [ˈtʋeːdə ˈkaːmər dɛr ˈstaːtə(ŋ) ɣeːnəˈraːl], lit. 'Second Chamber of the States General', or simply the Tweede Kamer) is the lower house of the bicameral parliament of the Netherlands, the States General, the other one being the Senate (First chamber). It has 150 seats in a semicircular seating arrangement. Seats are filled through elections using party-list proportional representation. The House is located in the Binnenhof in The Hague; although it has temporarily moved to the former building of the Ministry of Foreign Affairs at Bezuidenhoutseweg 67 in The Hague while the Binnenhof is being renovated.

== Name ==
The body is officially called the "House of Representatives" in English, although this is not a direct translation of its official Dutch name. The Dutch name, Tweede Kamer der Staten Generaal, literally translates as the "Second Chamber of the States General". It is colloquially referred to as "Second Chamber" (especially when the distinction is being made with the Senate as the First Chamber) or just the "Chamber". A member of the House is referred to as Kamerlid ("member of the Chamber") or Tweede Kamerlid ("member of the Second Chamber").

== Functions ==
The House of Representatives is the primary legislative body of the States General, where proposed legislation is discussed and the actions of the cabinet are reviewed. Both the Cabinet and the House of Representatives itself have the right to propose legislation; the House of Representatives discusses it and, if adopted by a majority, sends it on to the Senate. Both individual cabinet ministers and the cabinet as a whole must have parliament's confidence. Therefore, a minister, or the whole cabinet, must resign if a majority of parliament expresses it no longer has confidence in them. Review of the actions of the cabinet takes the form of formal interrogations in plenary and committee meetings, which may result in motions urging the cabinet to take, or refrain from, certain actions. No individual may be a member of both parliament and cabinet, except in a caretaker cabinet that has not yet been succeeded when a new House is sworn in.

=== EU decision making ===
Through functions like the scrutiny and political discussions before meetings of the Council of the European Union, the appointment of EU-rapporteurs, who monitor EU legislative files or topics for a relevant parliamentary committee, and participation in the Conference of Parliamentary Committees for Union Affairs the House of Representatives also plays a role in EU policy making.

=== Appointment of functionaries ===
The House of Representatives is also responsible for the first round of selection for judges to the Supreme Court of the Netherlands. It submits a list of three names for every vacant position to the Government. Furthermore, it elects the Dutch Ombudsman and their deputies.

== Elections ==
The normal term of the House of Representatives is four years. Elections are called when the government loses the parliament's confidence, the governing coalition breaks down, the term of the House of Representatives expires, or when no governing coalition can be formed.

=== Registration and eligibility ===
All citizens over the age of 18 are eligible to vote. Eligible citizens residing in the Netherlands are automatically registered through the municipal population register, while expatriates can permanently register at the municipality of The Hague provided they have a current Dutch passport or national ID. Residents of Aruba, Curaçao, and Sint Maarten can only vote if they have spent at least ten years residing in the Netherlands or work for the Dutch civil service. (Note: Residents of these countries are eligible to vote for their own parliaments instead.)

Prisoners serving a term of more than one year are not eligible to vote. From 2009 onwards, mentally incapacitated citizens have regained the right to vote.

=== Electoral system ===
The Netherlands uses a system of party-list proportional representation. Seats are allocated among the parties using the D'Hondt method with an election threshold of 0.67% (a Hare quota). Parties may choose to compete with different candidate lists in each of the country's twenty electoral circles. If a party competes with different candidate lists, the seats allocated to the party are subsequently allocated among its different candidate lists using the largest remainders method. The seats won by a list are first allocated to the candidates who, in votes cast for the candidate himself, have received at least 25% of the Hare quota (effectively ¼ of a seat or 0.17% of the total votes), regardless of their placement on the electoral list. If multiple candidates from a list pass this threshold, their ordering is determined based on the number of votes received. Any remaining seats are allocated to candidates according to their position on the electoral list.

From 1973 until 2017, parties were able to form electoral alliances to increase their share of seats in parliament, allowing parties to overcome some of the bias of the D'Hondt method; however, this practice has since been discontinued.

When a vacancy arises, the seat is offered to the next candidate on the candidate list to which the seat was originally allocated.

=== Formation of governing coalition ===
After all seats are allocated, a series of negotiations take place in order to form a government that, usually, commands a majority in the chamber. Since 2012, the House of Representatives appoints a "scout" to ask the major party leaders about prospective coalitions. On basis of the scout's interviews, the House of Representatives then appoints an informateur, who checks out possible coalitions, and a formateur, who leads negotiations. Before 2012, the informateur and formateur were appointed by the monarch. It typically takes a few months before the formateur is ready to accept a royal invitation to form a government and become prime minister. All cabinet members must resign from parliament, as the constitution does not allow a cabinet member to simultaneously hold a seat in the House of Representatives.

Due to the nationwide party-list system and the low election threshold, a typical House of Representatives has ten or more parties represented. Such fragmentation makes it nearly impossible for one party to win the 76 seats needed for a majority in the House of Representatives. Since the current party-list proportional representation system was introduced in 1917, no party has approached the number of seats needed for an outright majority. This fragmentation also makes it almost prohibitively difficult to win enough seats to govern alone. The highest number of seats won by a single party since then has been 54 out of 150, by the CDA in 1986 and 1989. Between 1891 and 1897, the Liberal Union was the last party to have an absolute majority of seats in the House of Representatives. All Dutch cabinets since then have been coalitions of two or more parties.

== Meeting place ==
Between 1815 and 1992, the House of Representatives was seated in the former ballroom of stadtholder William V in the Binnenhof. This room had first been used as a meeting chamber in 1796 by the National Assembly of the Batavian Republic. In 1992 it moved to the newly constructed expansion of the Binnenhof complex by Pi de Bruijn. This allowed more spacious seating arrangements, better public access and changed the layout from a layout with classroom oriented benches to a semi-circular layout. During the renovations of the Binnenhof complex (starting 2021) the House temporarily moved a few hundred metres to the former building of the Ministry of Foreign Affairs at Bezuidenhoutseweg 67 where a temporary meeting room resembling the Binnenhof room.

== Composition ==
To be elected to the House of Representatives, a person must be over 18 and hold a Dutch passport.

=== Historical compositions ===
Representation per party, between 1946 and 2025

Historically, there have been 100 seats in the House of Representatives. In 1956, this number was increased to 150, at which it remains today. Until 1992, the House met in de "Oude Zaal" in the historic part of the building in a classroom seating arrangement. In 1992 the House moved to its new plenary meeting room and offices design by Pi de Bruijn at which time a semi-circular seating arrangement was adopted. During the 2021-2031(planned) renovation of the Binnenhof complex, the temporary room was designed to be similar to the 1992 room.

To give an overview of the history of the House of Representatives, the figure on the right shows the seat distribution in the House from the first general elections after World War II (1946) to the most recent election. The left-wing parties are located towards the bottom, while the Christian parties are located in the center, and the right-wing parties towards the top. Occasionally, single-issue (or narrow-focus) parties have arisen, and these are shown at the extreme top. Vertical lines indicate general elections. Although these are generally held every four years, the resulting coalition governments do not always finish their term without a government crisis, which is often followed by new elections.

=== Current composition ===
Group	Leader	Seats
Democrats 66	Jan Paternotte	26 / 150
People's Party for Freedom and Democracy	Ruben Brekelmans	22 / 150
Progressief Nederland	Jesse Klaver	20 / 150
Party for Freedom	Geert Wilders	19 / 150
Christian Democratic Appeal	Henri Bontenbal	18 / 150
JA21	Joost Eerdmans	9 / 150
Forum for Democracy	Lidewij de Vos	7 / 150
Markuszower Group	Gidi Markuszower	7 / 150
Farmer–Citizen Movement	Henk Vermeer	3 / 150
DENK	Stephan van Baarle	3 / 150
Reformed Political Party	Chris Stoffer	3 / 150
Party for the Animals	Esther Ouwehand	3 / 150
Christian Union	Mirjam Bikker	3 / 150
Socialist Party	Jimmy Dijk	3 / 150
50Plus	Jan Struijs	2 / 150
Volt Netherlands	Laurens Dassen	1 / 150
Keijzer	Mona Keijzer	1 / 150

== Parliamentary committees ==
Parliamentary committees are set up for a specific substantive or procedural subject. The committees consult in so-called committee meetings. A standing committee is a committee set up to monitor a policy area of a ministry. They are defined in the Rules of Procedure of the House of Representatives. Standing committees were established in 1953 to relieve the plenary of overly detailed discussions. In the period from the 2023 Dutch general election, there are a total of fifteen standing committees. Except for the Ministry of General Affairs, there is a permanent committee for each ministry that deals with subjects in the field of that ministry. For some ministries, the portfolio is divided over several committees. In addition, there are standing committees without a ministry for European Affairs and Digital Affairs.
