= List of members of the House of Representatives of the Netherlands for Party for the Animals =

This is a list of all members of the House of Representatives of the Netherlands for Party for the Animals.

Name	Begin date	End date	Ref.
Eva Akerboom	16 October 2018	3 February 2019	
Eva Akerboom	13 October 2022	1 February 2023	
Eva Akerboom	10 May 2023	10 August 2023	
Eva van Esch	9 October 2019	5 December 2023	
Anja Hazekamp	24 January 2012	13 May 2012	
Ines Kostić	6 December 2023		
Femke Merel van Kooten-Arissen	23 March 2017	15 October 2018	
Femke Merel van Kooten-Arissen	4 February 2019	16 July 2019	
Esther Ouwehand	30 November 2006	23 January 2012	
Esther Ouwehand	13 May 2012	16 November 2015	
Esther Ouwehand	17 October 2016	12 October 2022	
Esther Ouwehand	2 February 2023		
Lammert van Raan	23 March 2017	5 December 2023	
Christine Teunissen	11 October 2018	30 January 2019	
Christine Teunissen	31 March 2021		
Marianne Thieme	30 November 2006	23 January 2012	
Marianne Thieme	13 May 2012	10 October 2018	
Marianne Thieme	31 January 2019	8 October 2019	
Leonie Vestering	31 March 2021	9 May 2023	
Leonie Vestering	11 August 2023	26 September 2023	
Frank Wassenberg	17 November 2015	17 October 2016	
Frank Wassenberg	23 March 2017	5 December 2023	
