= List of candidates in the 2014 European Parliament election in the Netherlands =

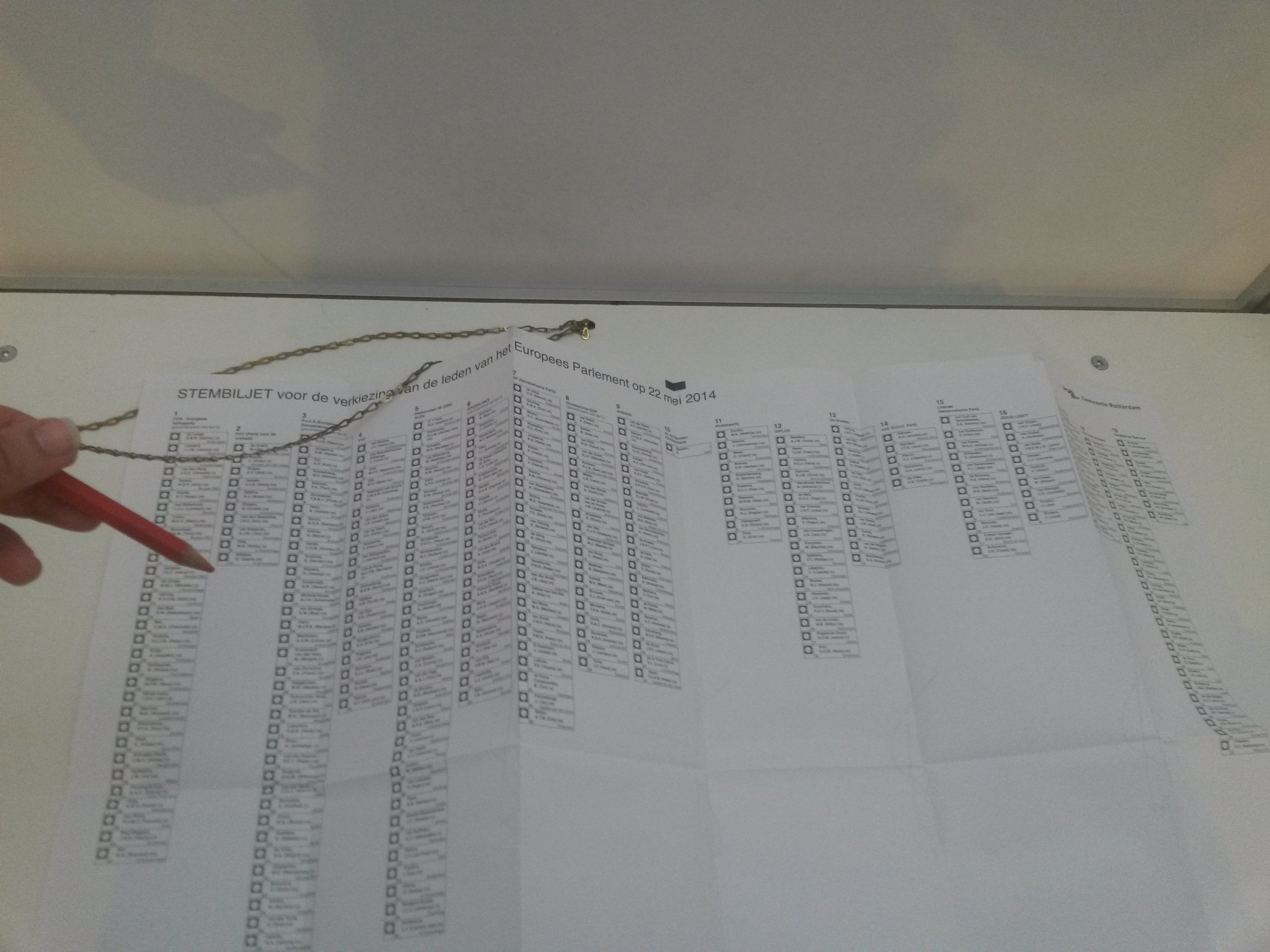
Voting ballot

The 2014 European Parliament election for the election of the delegation from the Netherlands was held on 22 May 2014. This is the 8th time the elections have been held for the European elections in the Netherlands.

== Background ==
=== Participation of political groups ===
On 14 April 2014, the Electoral Council had a public hearing on the validity of the lists of candidates for the election of the Dutch seats for the European Parliament. The candidate list of the Women's Party was declared invalid because the required deposit to participate (€11,250) was not paid. Furthermore, the following candidates of the Party for the Animals were removed because their documentation was incomplete and, as such, could not participate in the election:

- Tom Regan (United States);
- Will Kymlicka (Canada);
- J. M. Coetzee (Australia).

=== Numbering of the candidates list ===
In the public hearing on 14 April 2014, the Electoral Council numbered the lists of candidates. The parties who had obtained one or more seats in 2009 at the last election to the European Parliament were given a number based on the number of votes that the parties had achieved in the previous election. These totaled 8 candidate lists. The party with the most votes got number 1 and the rest were listed accordingly. The list numbers for the remaining 11 candidates were decided by a lottery.

Official order and names of the lists for the European Parliament election in the Netherlands
List		English translation	List name (Dutch)
1	list	CDA - European People's Party	CDA — Europese Volkspartij
2	list	PVV (Party for Freedom)	PVV (Partij voor de Vrijheid)
3	list	P.v.d.A./European Social Democrats	P.v.d.A./Europese Sociaaldemocraten
4	list	VVD	
5	list	Democrats 66 (D66) - ALDE	Democraten 66 (D66) - ALDE
6	list	GreenLeft	GroenLinks
7	list	SP (Socialist Party)	SP (Socialistische Partij)
8	list	Christian Union-SGP	ChristenUnie–SGP
9	list	Article 50	Artikel 50
10	list	IQ, the Rights-Obligations-Party	IQ, de Rechten-Plichten-Partij
11	list	Pirate Party	Piratenpartij
12	list	50PLUS	
13	list	The Greens	De Groenen
14	list	Anti EU(ro) Party	Anti EU(ro) Partij
15	list	Liberal Democratic Party	Liberaal Democratische Partij
16	list	Jesus Lives	Jezus Leeft
17	list	ichooseforhonest.eu	ikkiesvooreerlijk.eu
18	list	Party for the Animals	Partij voor de Dieren
19	list	Focus and Simplicity	Aandacht en Eenvoud

== CDA - European People's Party ==
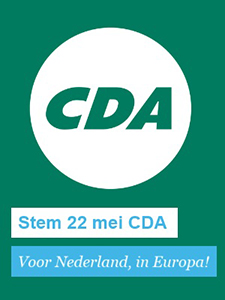
campaign poster

Candidate list for the Christian Democratic Appeal
Number	Candidate	Votes	Result
1	Esther de Lange		Elected
2	Jeroen Lenaers		Elected
3	Wim van de Camp		Elected
4	Chantal van den Berg		
5	Dirk Gotink		
6	Kaya Koçak		
7	Lambert van Nistelrooij		Elected
8	Marc Frans		
9	Tom Berendsen		
10	Wim Eilering		
11	Frank Lambermont		
12	Irene Janssen		
13	Mireille de Jonge		
14	Rob Göring		
15	Sebastiaan den Bak		
16	Charlotte Bol		
17	Peter Roelofs		
18	Alaattin Erdal		
19	Wiebe Strikwerda		
20	Marc Wiggers		
21	Jef Wintermans		
22	Wijnand Marchal		
23	Pim Walenkamp		
24	Klaas Staal		
25	Annie Schreijer-Pierik		Elected
26	Jo Spätgens		
27	Elaine Vlaming-Kroon		
28	Karla Peijs		
29	Yvonne van Rooij		
30	Hanja Maij-Weggen		
31	Bernard Bot		
Total		721,766	

== PVV (Party for Freedom) ==
Candidate list for the Party for Freedom
Number	Candidate	Votes	Result
1	Marcel de Graaff		Elected
2	Vicky Maeijer		Elected
3	Olaf Stuger		Elected
4	Hans Jansen		Replacement
5	Auke Zijlstra		Replacement
6	Andre Elissen		Replacement
7	Ino van den Besselaar		
8	Ton van Kesteren		
9	Willie Dille		
10	Geert Wilders		Elected, but declined
Total		633,114	

== P.v.d.A./European Social Democrats ==
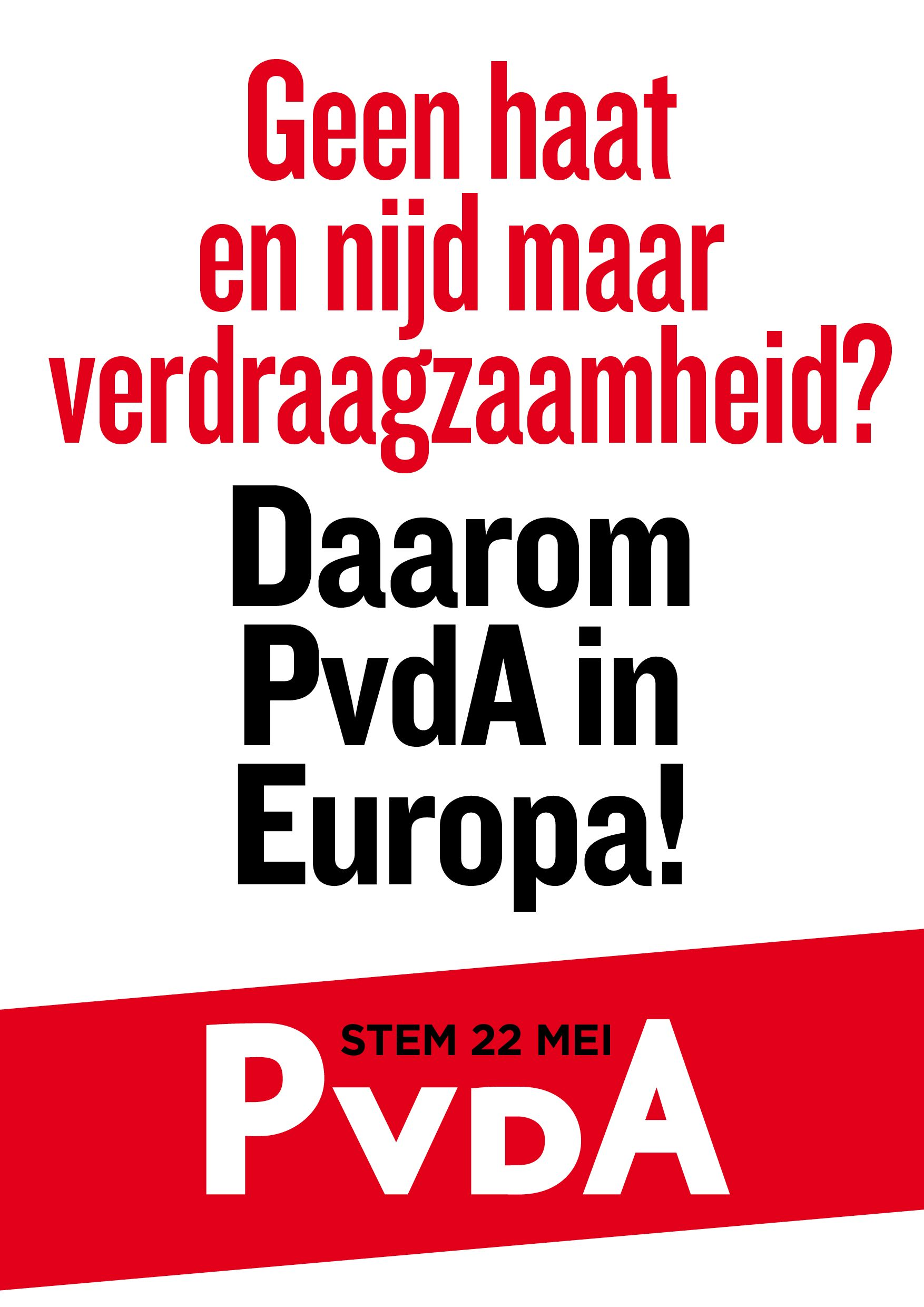
PvdA campaign poster "No hate and jealously, but tolerance? - That's why PvdA in Europe!"

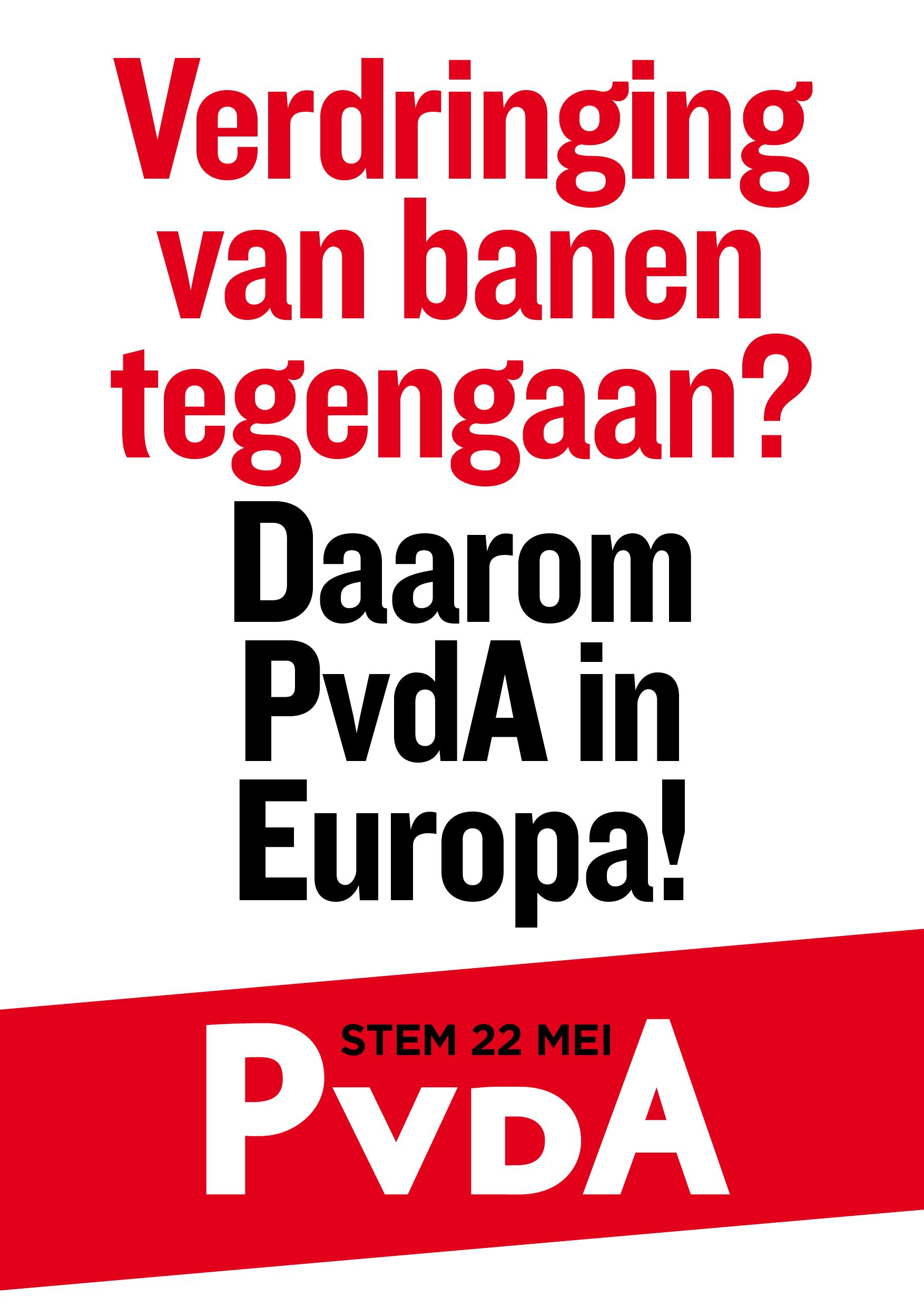
PvdA campaign poster "Fight displacement on the job market? - That's why PvdA in Europe!"

Candidate list for the Labour Party
Number	Candidate	Votes	Result
1	Paul Tang		Elected
2	Agnes Jongerius		Elected
3	Kati Piri		Elected
4	Michiel Emmelkamp		
5	Paul Sneijder		
6	Flora Goudappel		
7	Adnan Tekin		
8	Bernard Naron		
9	Nejra Kalkan		
10	Kirsten Verdel		
11	Sander Terphuis		
12	Houkje Rijpstra		
13	Gerard Oosterwijk		
14	Antoinette Michels-Knoet		
15	Bas van Drooge		
16	Marijke Clerx		
17	Louis Meuleman		
18	Margot Kraneveldt-van der Veen		
19	Frank van Oorschot		
20	Maaike Baggerman		
21	Jan Schuurman Hess		
22	Marjolein Greuter-de Wit		
23	Henk Letschert		
24	Annelies Pilon		
25	Pieter van der Hoeven		
26	Willemien Ruijgrok		
27	Geert van der Varst		
28	Gadiza Bouazani		
29	Muus Groot		
30	Nelleke Vedelaar		
31	Albert de Vries		
32	Maruschka Gijsbertha		
33	Dick Buursink		
34	Nurten Karisli		
35	Ard van der Tuuk		
36	Amma Asante		
37	Henk Leenders		
38	Fatihya Abdi		
39	Frank de Vries		
40	Ing Yoe Tan		
41	Chris Leeuwe		
42	Souad Haouli		
43	Esther-Mirjam Sent		
44	Odile Wolfs		
45	Fatima Elatik		
46	Trude Maas		
47	Kirsten van den Hul		
Total		446,763	

== VVD ==
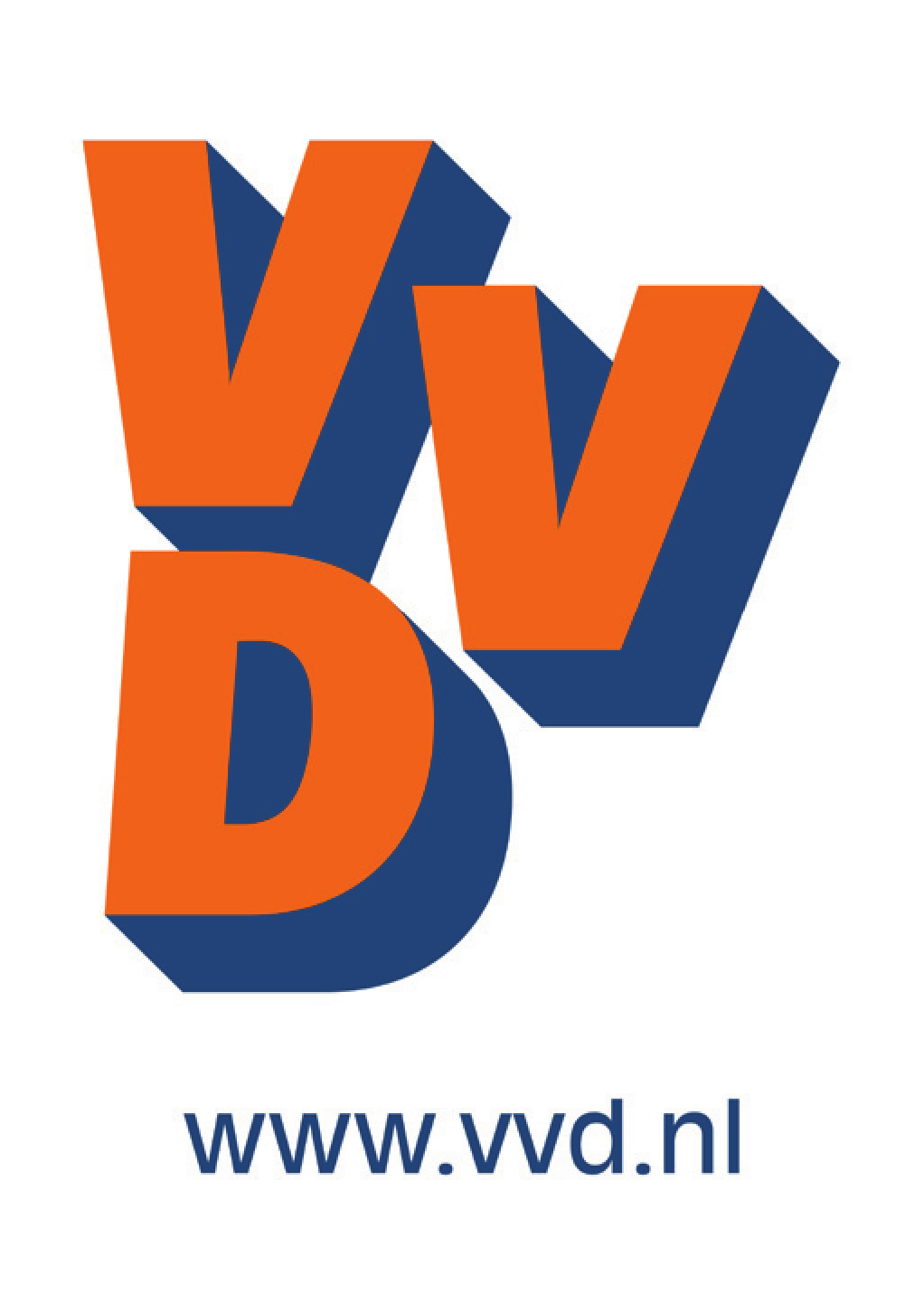
campaign poster

Candidate list for the People's Party for Freedom and Democracy
Number	Candidate	Votes	Result
1	Hans van Baalen		Elected
2	Cora van Nieuwenhuizen-Wijbenga		Elected
3	Maarten Smit		
4	Mark Dijk		
5	Caroline Nagtegaal-van Doorn		Replacement
6	Jan Huitema		Elected
7	Joost van den Akker		
8	Pieter van de Stadt		
9	Floor Vermeulen		
10	Jeroen Van Wijngaarden		
11	Monique List-de Roos		
12	Wyno Zwanenburg		
13	Huub Hieltjes		
14	Robert van Rijn		
15	Sander Janssen		
16	Erik Hoogendoorn		
17	Jan Poppens		
18	Roel Boumans		
19	Hans Pluckel		
20	Derk Jan Eppink		
Total		571,176	

== Democrats 66 (D66) - ALDE ==
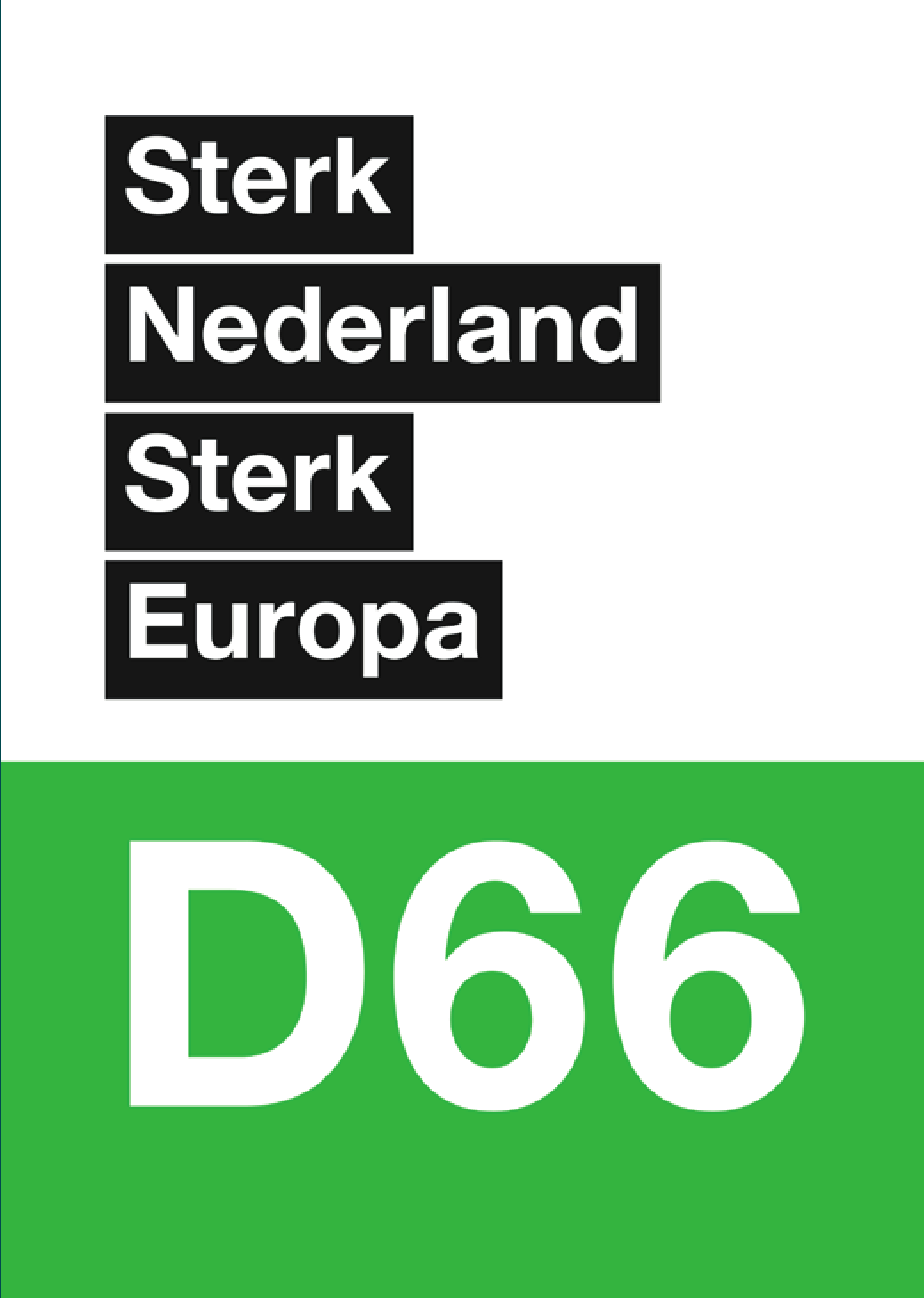
campaign poster

Candidate list for Democrats 66
Number	Candidate	Votes	Result
1	Sophie in 't Veld		Elected
2	Gerben-Jan Gerbrandij		Elected
3	Marietje Schaake		Elected
4	Matthijs van Miltenburg		Elected
5	Raoul Boucke		
6	Anke Klein		
7	Rinke Brussel		
8	Pauline Kastermans		
9	Ivo Thijssen		
10	Achraf Bouali		
11	Paul Breitbarth		
12	Robert Wintraecken		
13	Joost Sneller		
14	Heerd Jan Hoogeveen		
15	Rutger Goethart		
16	Abele Kamminga		
17	Osman Biçen		
18	Raymond Frenken		
19	Robert Schliessler		
20	Conny van Stralen		
21	Ton van der Vegt		
22	Bastiaan de Bruijne		
23	Leon Vaessen		
24	Bob van den Bos		
25	Janine Costa		
26	Caecilia van Peski		
27	Walter Jansen		
28	Peter van Leeuwen		
29	Stefan Pack		
30	Rineke Gieske-Mastenbroek		
31	Alexandra van Huffelen		
32	Jan Paul Peters		
33	Isa Yusibov		
34	Doeke Eisma		
35	Johanna Boogerd-Quaak		
36	Laurens Jan Brinkhorst		
Total		735,825	

== GreenLeft ==
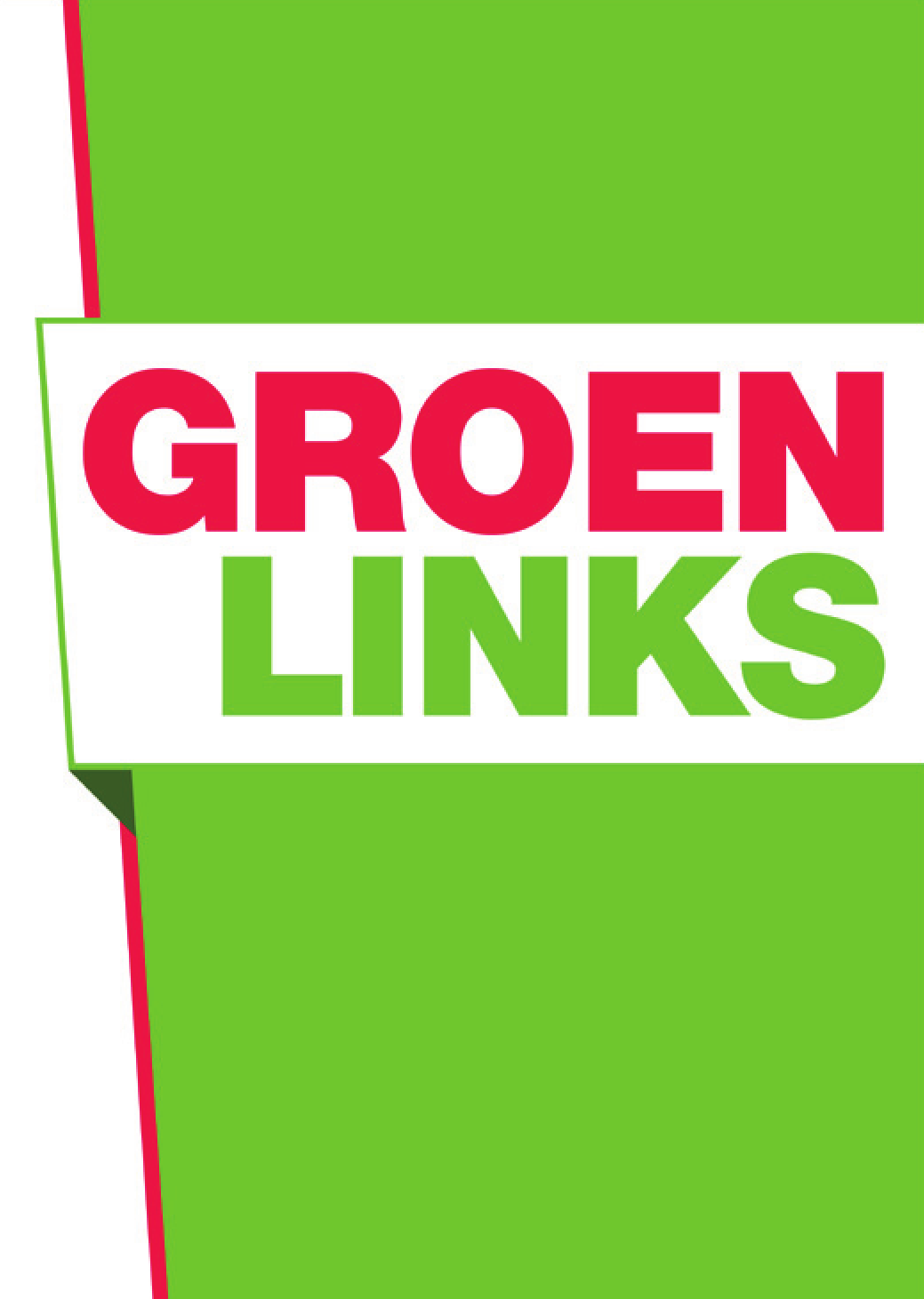
GreenLeft campaign poster "GreenLeft"

Candidate list for GroenLinks
Number	Candidate	Votes	Result
1	Bas Eickhout		Elected
2	Judith Sargentini		Elected
3	Mattias Gijsbertsen		
4	Isabelle Diks		
5	Lara de Araujo Cerqueira de Brito		
6	Gert-Jan Krabbendam		
7	Daphne Dertien		
8	Jeroni Vergeer		
9	Truuske Smits		
10	Toine van de Ven		
11	Guliz Tomruk-Kisi		
12	Arie van den Brand		
13	Tineke Strik		
14	Paul Smeulders		
15	Mariëtte Pennarts-Pouw		
16	Jasper Blom		
17	Marjolein Meijer		
18	Huub Bellemakers		
19	Rik Grashoff		
20	Nel van Dijk		
21	Joost Lagendijk		
22	Vincent Bijlo		
Total		331,594	

== SP (Socialist Party) ==
Candidates for the European Parliament from the SP
SP candidates 1989	(1989)
SP candidates 1994	(1994)
SP candidates 1999	(1999)
SP candidates 2004	(2004)
SP candidates 2009	(2009)
SP candidates 2014	(2014)
SP candidates 2019	(2019)
SP candidates 2024	(2024)

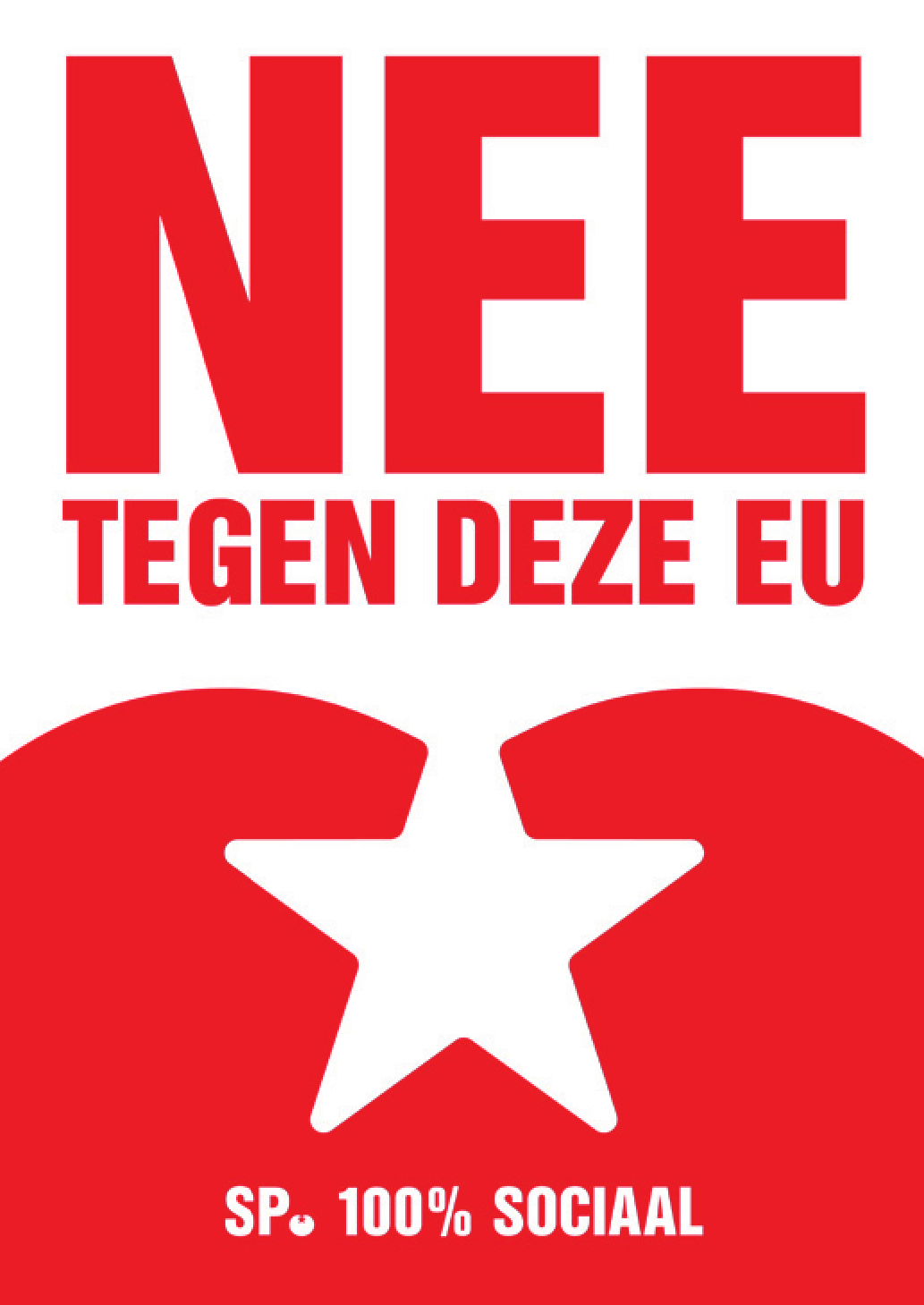
SP campaign poster "No, against this EU"

Candidate list for the Socialist Party
Number	Candidate	Votes	Result
1	Dennis de Jong		Elected
2	Eric Smaling		
3	Anne-Marie Mineur		Elected
4	Erik Wesselius		
5	Niels Jongerius		
6	Frank Köhler		
7	Fenna Feenstra		
8	Reinout Heydra		
9	Alexander van Steenderen		
10	Gabriella Molica		
11	Dick Schaap		
12	Roland van Tilborg		
13	Rick de Jong		
14	Jamila Yahyaoui		
15	Peter Verschuren		
16	Jos van der Horst		
17	Alie Dekker-van het Hof		
18	Mariska ten Heuw		
19	Hans van Hooft		
20	Peter Visser		
21	Jamal El Kaddouri		
22	Younis Lutfula		
23	Trix de Roos-Consemulder		
24	Jay Pahladsingh		
25	Erik Meijer		
Total		458,079	

== Christian Union-SGP ==
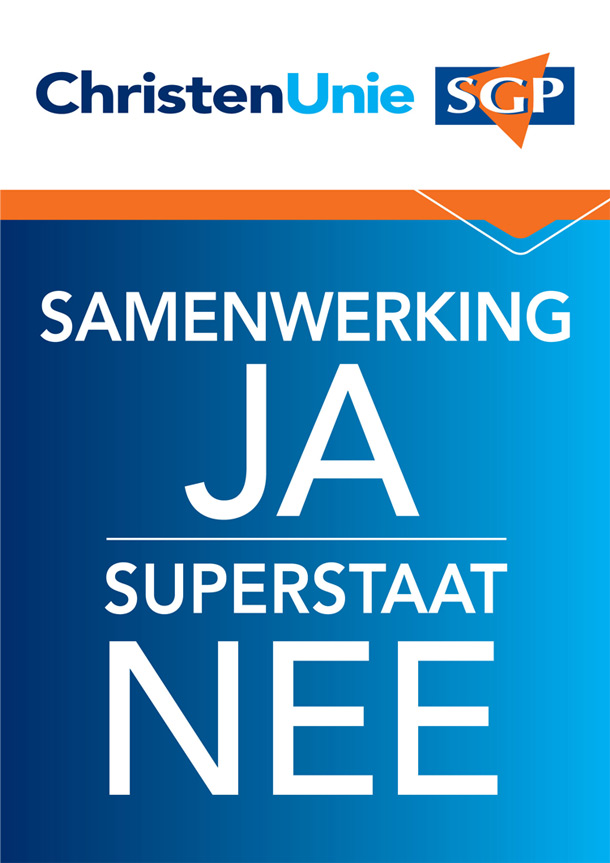
Christian Union - SGP campaign poster "Working together YES - Superstate NO"

Candidate list for the Christian Union-SGP
Number	Candidate	Votes	Result
1	Peter van Dalen		
2	Bas Belder		
3	Ruud van Eijle		
4	Stieneke van der Graaf		
5	Bert-Jan Ruissen		
6	Leon Meijer		
7	Henk van den Berge		
8	Joanne van der Schee-van de Kamp		
9	Rinze Broekema		
10	Diederik van Dijk		
11	Maaike Niemeijer-Schaap		
12	Kees van Burg		
13	Benjamin Beldman		
14	Mark Knevel		
15	Evert-Jan Brouwer		
16	Auke Minnema		
17	Richard Donk		
18	Andries Bouwman		
19	Jochem Pleijsier		
20	Hans Tanis		
Total		364,843	

== Article 50 ==
Candidate list for the Article 50
Number	Candidate	Votes	Result
1	Daniël van der Stoep		
2	Alexander Sassen		
3	Yernaz Ramautarsing		
4	Dirk Jan Keijser		
5	Gerton van Unnik		
6	Kim Winkelaar		
7	Erna Beentjes		
8	Lammert Dijkstra		
9	Boy van Meetelen		
10	Arwin van Wermeskerken		
11	Luc de Krosse		
12	Alle de Haan		
13	Teunis Dokter		
14	Arnoud Bakhuizen		
15	Ton Walthaus		
16	Mike de Roode		
17	Andreas Beverloo		
18	Maurice Dörenberg		
19	Jasper de Groot		
20	Luca de la Torre Celorio		
21	Pieter Appel		
Total		24,069	

== IQ, the Rights-Obligations-Party ==
Candidate list for the IQ, the Rights-Obligations-Party
Number	Candidate	Votes	Result
1	Gunther Niessen		
Total		1,705	

== Pirate Party ==
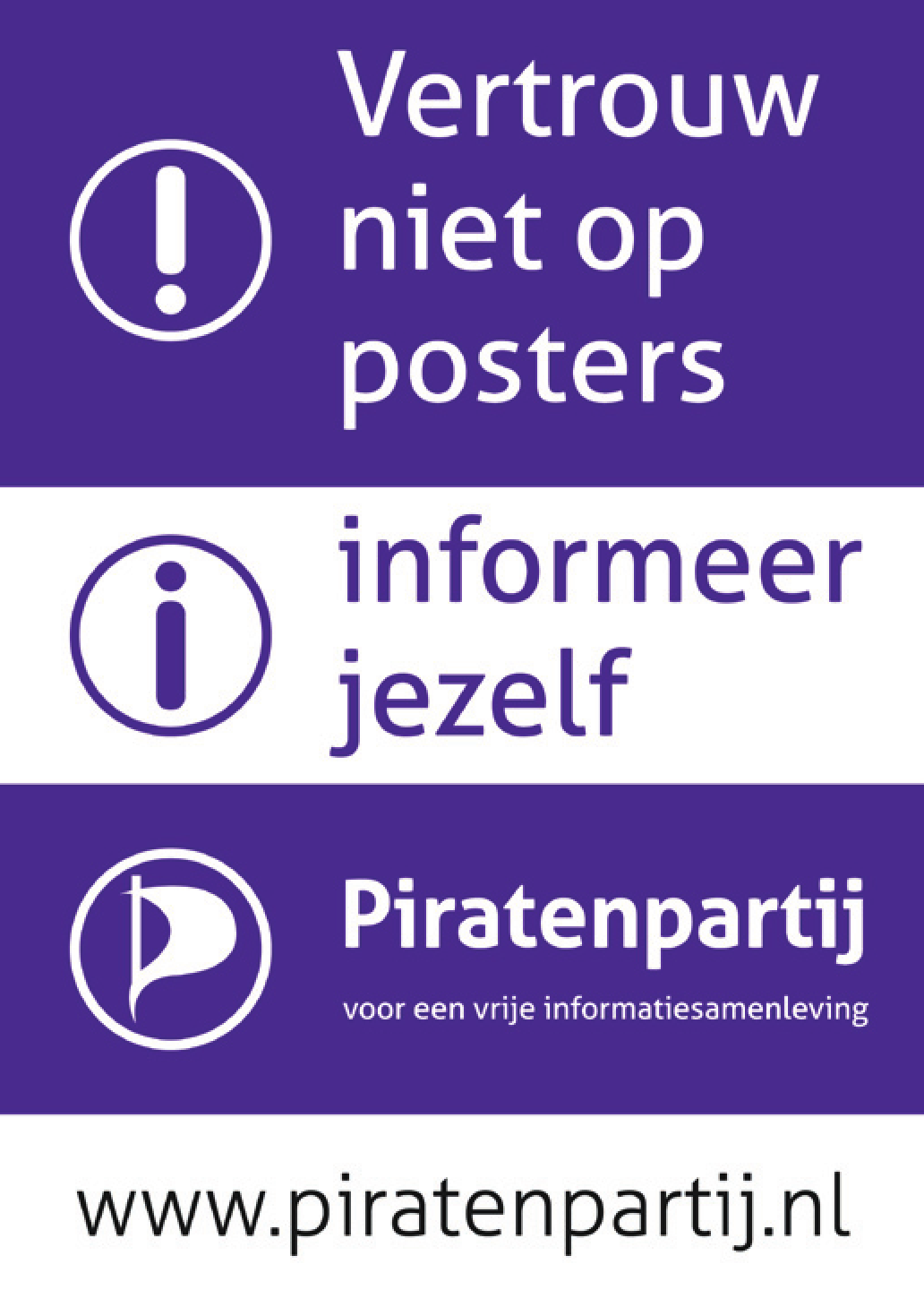
Pirate Party campaign poster "Don't trust posters. Inform yourself. Pirate Party"

Candidate list for the Pirate Party
Number	Candidate	Votes	Result
1	Matthijs Pontier		
2	Janmaarten Batstra		
3	Charif Mews		
4	Gerben Brands		
5	Steven Russchenberg		
6	Gijs Peskens		
7	Wiel Maessen		
8	Rogier Huurman		
9	Dylan Hallegraeff		
10	Dirk Poot		
Total		40,216	

== 50PLUS ==
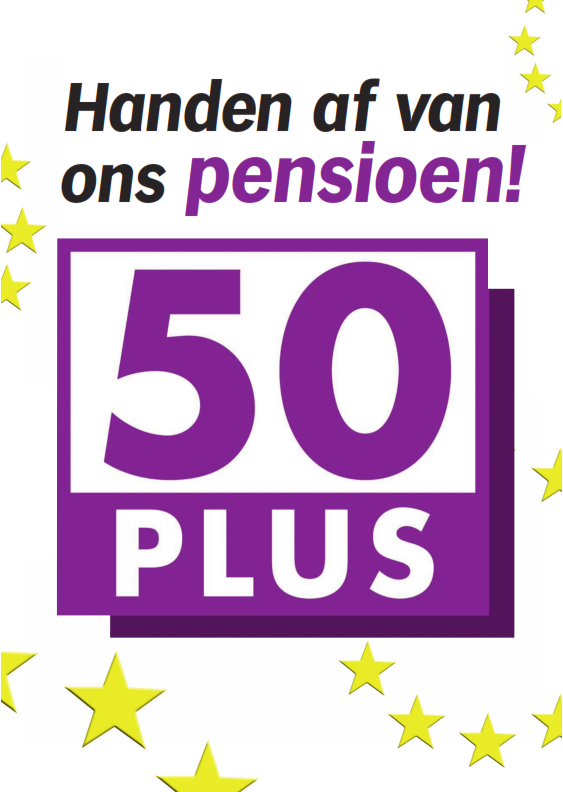
50PLUS campaign poster "Don't touch our pensions. 50PLUS"

Candidate list for the 50PLUS
Number	Candidate	Votes	Result
1	Toine Manders		
2	Theo Heere		
3	Petra Vosters		
4	Chris Spooren		
5	Adriana Hernández Martínez		
6	Olga de Meij		
7	Joop van Orsouw		
8	Theun Wiersma		
9	Jan van Houwelingen		
10	Maurice Koopman		
11	Pietsje Spijkstra		
12	Lissette Leegstra		
13	Roelof Mulder		
14	Jaap Haasnoot		
15	Ruud Koornstra		
16	Wibo van de Linde		
17	Astrid Engels-de Groot		
18	Henk Krol		
Total		175,343	

== The Greens ==
Candidate list for The Greens
Number	Candidate	Votes	Result
1	Jolanda Verburg		
2	Mirjam van Rijn		
3	Judith Hendrickx		
4	Khaled Sakhel		
5	Otto ter Haar		
6	Gerben Uunk		
7	Paul Freriks		
8	Janneke Schadee		
9	Jozef van Kessel		
10	Rijndert Doting		
11	Gerero van der Heijden		
12	Ronald Schönberger		
Total		10,883	

== Anti EU(ro) Party ==
Candidate list for the Anti EU(ro) Party
Number	Candidate	Votes	Result
1	Arnold Reinten		
2	Jack Rijnders		
3	Claudia Pieron		
4	Jerry Scholtens		
5	Carla de Vries		
Total		12,290	

== Liberal Democratic Party ==
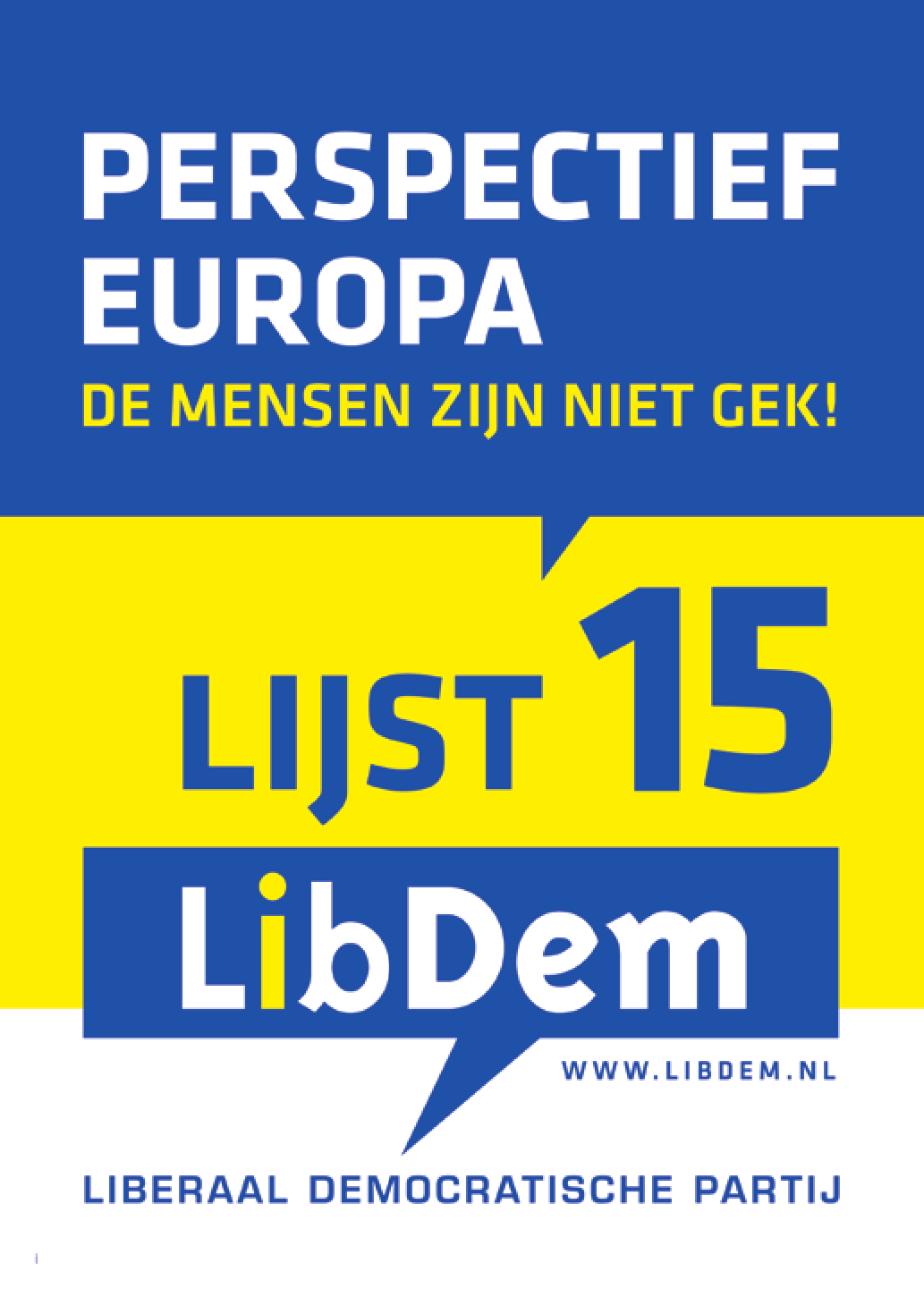
Liberal Democratic Party campaign poster "Perspective Europe, the people are not insane"

Candidate list for the Liberal Democratic Party
Number	Candidate	Votes	Result
1	Sammy van Tuyll van Serooskerken		
2	Frits van Endhoven		
3	Wilma van Dartel		
4	Eleonore Witteveen		
5	Jaap van Eenennaam		
6	Petra de Boevere		
7	Bart van Teeffelen		
8	Wolf van Ittersum		
9	Jan Jaap ten Hoor		
10	Hans Berends		
11	Dirk Cohen Tervaert		
12	Frank Ankersmit		
Total		6,349	

== Jesus Lives ==
Candidate list for the Jesus Lives
Number	Candidate	Votes	Result
1	Joop van Ooijen		
2	Andreas van Ooijen		
3	John van Hoek		
4	Laurens Vonder		
5	Victor Oudhoff		
6	Willem de Visser		
7	Cornelis van Breugel		
8	Jan Romijn		
9	Jane Winters		
Total		9,507	

== ikkiesvooreerlijk.eu ==
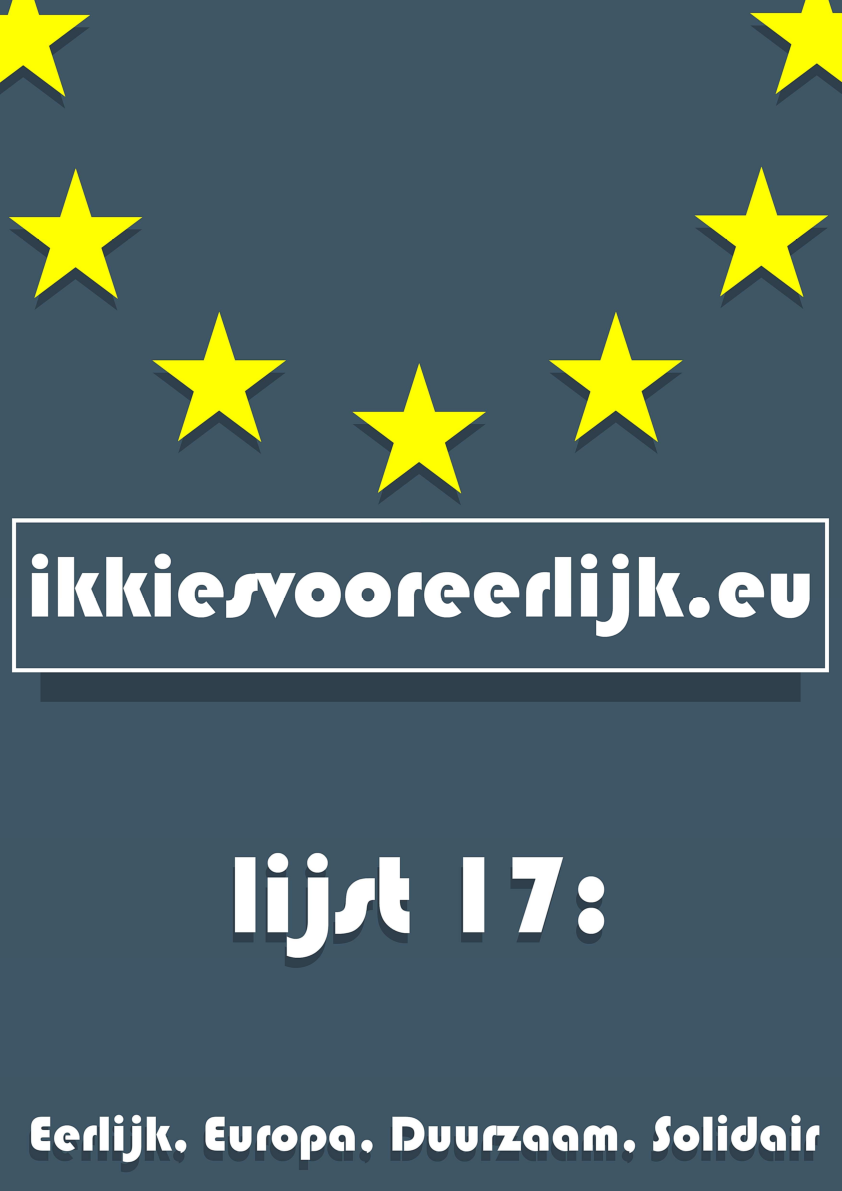
ichooseforhonest.eu campaign poster "ikkiesvooreerlijk.eu"

Candidate list for the ikkiesvooreerlijk.eu
Number	Candidate	Votes	Result
1	Michel van Hulten		
2	Hugo van der Zee		
3	Lavinia Warnars		
4	Armando Lampe		
5	Antonia Raileanu		
6	Albert Leppers		
7	Peter van de Mosselaar		
8	Paul Gerbrands		
9	Sent Wierda		
10	Marten Bierman		
11	Gustaaf van Beers		
Total		6,796	

== Party for the Animals ==
Candidate list for the Party for the Animals
Number	Candidate	Votes	Result
1	Anja Hazekamp		Elected
2	Corinne Cornelisse		
3	Frank Wassenberg		
4	Lammert van Raan		
5	Pablo Moleman		
6	Luuk van der Veer		
7	Daniëlle de Man		
8	Marco van der Wel		
9	Gerjan Kelder		
10	Christine Teunissen		
11	Niko Koffeman		
12	Esther Ouwehand		
13	Marianne Thieme		
14	Jan Peter Cruiming		
15	Eddy Terstall		
16	Peter Nicolaï		
17	Annemarie Postma		
18	Ewald Engelen		
19	Guido Weijers		
20	Babette van Veen		
21	Jan Siebelink		
22	Maarten Biesheuvel		
23	Adri van der Heijden		
24	Mensje van der Steen		
25	Paul Cliteur		
26	Ingrid Newkirk		
27	Redmond O'Hanlon		
Total		200,254	

== Aandacht en Eenvoud ==
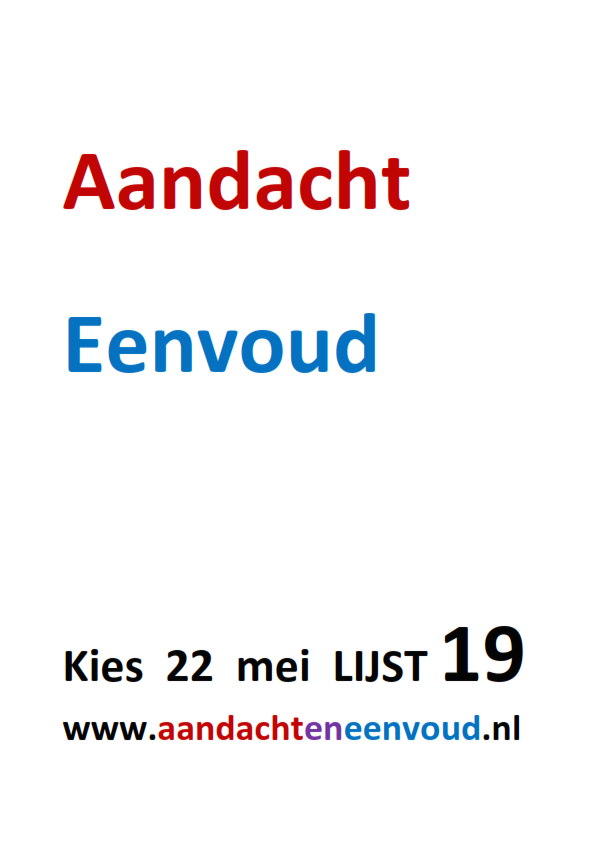
Focus and Simplicity campaign poster "Focus Simplicity"

Candidate list for the Aandacht en Eenvoud
Number	Candidate	Votes	Result
1	Abraham de Kruijf		
2	Tom van Doormaal		
3	Sera Spanier		
4	Mohammed Boudadi		
5	Sheila Hard		
6	Nico van den Bergh		
7	Annelies Brons-Stuip		
8	Peter Schuttevaar		
Total		3,174	

== Sources ==
- Core data of the 2014 European Election by the Electoral Committee
- Minutes from the Election Committee
