= List of Party for the Animals members of the European Parliament =

This is a list of all (former) Member of the European Parliament for the Party for the Animals (PvdD)

== Seats in the European Parliament ==
Election year	List	# of overall votes	% of overall vote	# of overall seats won	+/–	Notes
2004	List	153,432	3.22 (#9)	0 / 27		
2009	List	157,735	3.46 (#9)	0 / 25	0	
2014	List	200,254	4.21 (#9)	1 / 26	1 ▲	
2019	List	220,938	4.02 (#8)	1 / 26	0	
2024	List	281,600	4.52 (#8)	1 / 31	0	

== Alphabetical ==
=== Elected members of the European Parliament (from 1979) ===
Current members of the European Parliament are in bold.

European Parliament member	Sex	Period	Photo
**Anja Hazekamp**	Female	from 1 July 2014 till present	
