= Luuk Folkerts =

Dutch politician and environmental consultant

Luuk Folkerts (born 1963) is a Dutch politician and environmental consultant serving since 28 November 2010 as chairman of the Party for the Animals (Partij voor de Dieren, PvdD), succeeding to party founder Marianne Thieme. Previously he was the PvdD's treasurer and a candidate on the lists for the 2007 election of the States-Provincial of Utrecht, the Dutch Senate election of 2007 as well as the Dutch general election of 2010, but was not elected to a seat.

Folkerts studied physics and worked at Ecofys, an international operating environmental consultancy, where he was dealing with matters of renewable energy and climate policy.
