= Ines Kostić =

Dutch politician (born 1984)

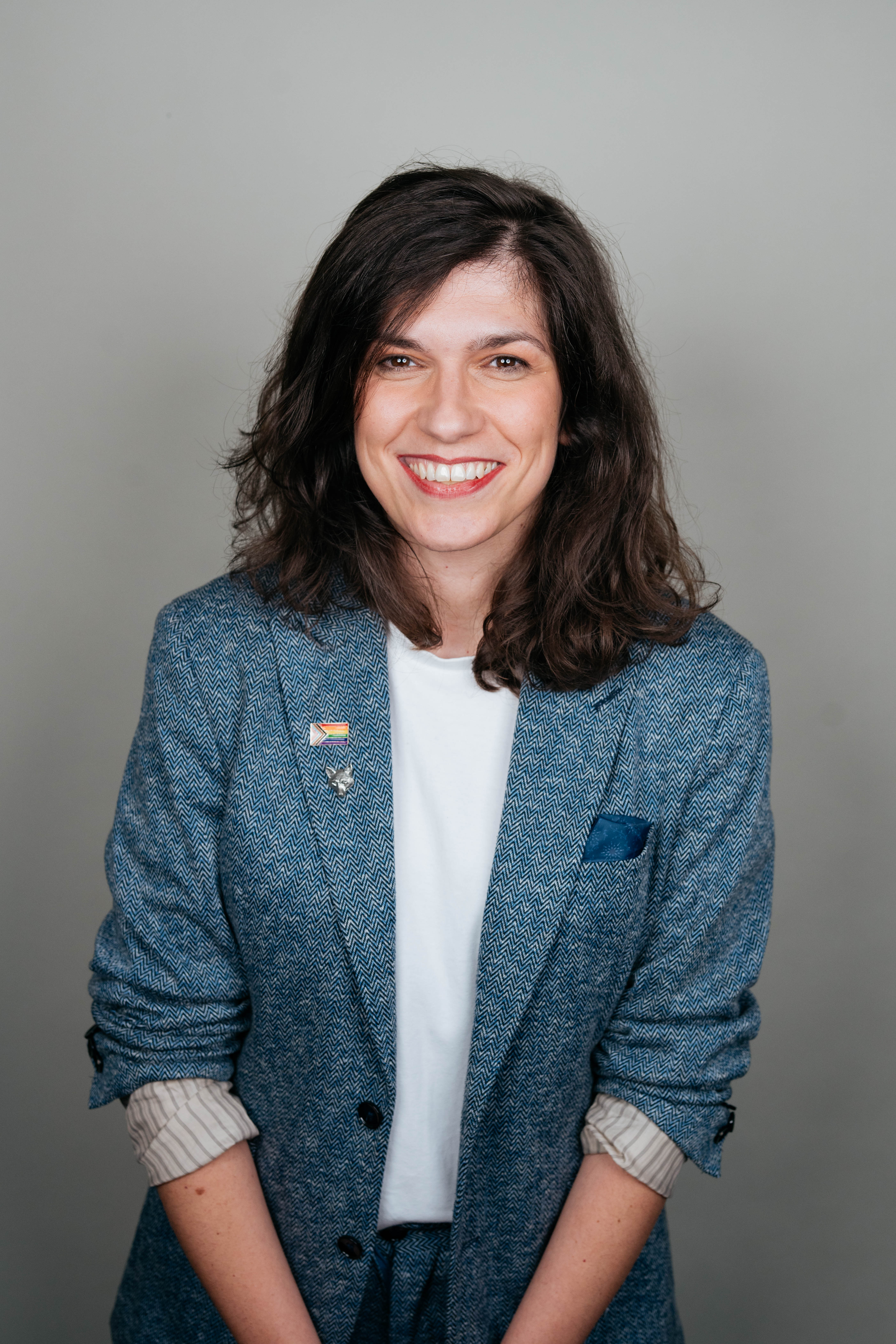
- Kostić in 2023

Member of the House of Representatives
- Incumbent
- Assumed office 6 December 2023

Member of the Provincial Council of North Holland
- Incumbent
- Assumed office 28 March 2019

Personal details
- Born: Ines Kostić; 21 October 1984 (age 41) Mostar, SR Bosnia and Herzegovina, SFR Yugoslavia
- Party: Party for the Animals
- Children: 1
- Education: University of Groningen (BA); University of Antwerp (MSc)

Ines Kostić (born 21 October 1984) is a Bosnian-born Dutch political scientist and politician of the Party for the Animals (PvdD), who has served as a member of the Provincial Council of North Holland since 2019, and as a member of the House of Representatives since 2023. They are the first non-binary person to have been elected into the House of Representatives.

== Early life ==
Kostić was born in Mostar in present-day Bosnia and Herzegovina to a Bosnian mother and a Croat-Serb father, and they were raised there. At the age of 10, they fled the Bosnian War with their parents, seeking refuge in the Netherlands. From Ter Apel, they were transferred to an asylum seekers' center in The Hague. The family was later assigned a house in Niekerk, located in the Province of Groningen. Kostić obtained a bachelor's degree in art, culture and media studies from the University of Groningen. They subsequently completed a master's programme in political science at the University of Antwerp.

== Politics ==
In May 2017, Kostić became a board member of the Animal Politics Foundation – the international branch of the Party for the Animals. They won a seat in the Provincial Council of North Holland in the 2019 provincial election, and were re-elected in the 2023 provincial election. They were the parliamentary leader of the Party for the Animals in the council.

On 22 November 2023, Kostić ran in the snap general election as the second candidate on the PvdD list, and was elected into the House of Representatives. They were installed as MP on 6 December 2023 as the first non-binary member in Dutch parliamentary history, and they are their party's spokesperson for environment, agriculture, the interior, infrastructure, housing, education, culture, social affairs, and healthcare. When the right-wing Schoof cabinet was formed, Kostić asked ministers-designate of the populist Party for Freedom (PVV) about their views on the Great Replacement conspiracy theory in response to previous controversial statements. A motion filed by Kostić urging the government to meet nature conservation commitments passed the House with the support of two coalition parties. Later, alongside Dion Graus (PVV), Kostić called for a ban on the trade and ownership of animals prohibited from breeding, such as pugs and Sphynx cats. The House approved their motion, requesting the government to take action.

== Personal life ==
Kostić is non-binary, and they are a vegan. As of 2024, they live in Hilversum with their girlfriend and daughter.

== Electoral history ==
Electoral history of Ines Kostić
Year	Body	Party	Pos.	Votes	Result		Ref.
Year	Body	Party	Pos.	Votes	Party seats	Individual	Ref.
2017	House of Representatives	Party for the Animals	28	1,377	5	Lost	
2021	House of Representatives	Party for the Animals	12	10,013	6	Lost	
2023	House of Representatives	Party for the Animals	2	15,232	3	Won	
2024	European Parliament	Party for the Animals	40 (Note: Kostić participated as a lijstduwer.)	2,544	1	Lost	
2025	House of Representatives	Party for the Animals	2	22,301	3	Won	
