= Dion Graus =

Dutch politician (born 1967)

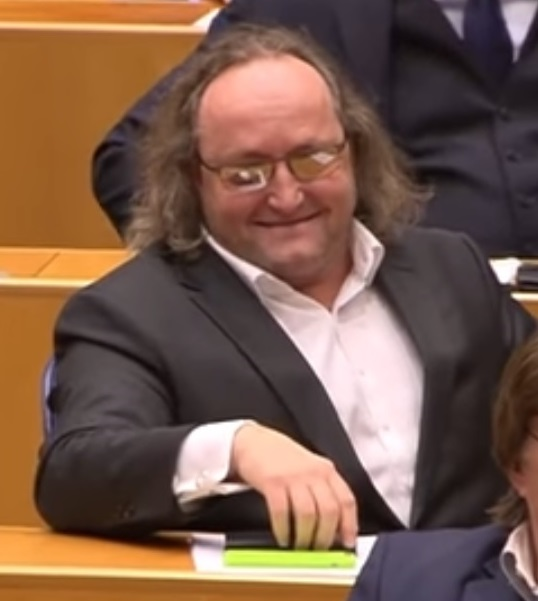
- D.J.G. Graus

Member of the House of Representatives
- Incumbent
- Assumed office 30 November 2006

Personal details
- Born: Dion Jean Gilbert Graus; 19 March 1967 (age 59) Heerlen
- Party: Party for Freedom
- Occupation: Politician

Dion Jean Gilbert Graus (born 19 March 1967 in Heerlen) is a Dutch politician. He has been an MP on behalf of the Party for Freedom (Partij voor de Vrijheid, PVV) since 30 November 2006.

Graus is a former car salesman and sales representative in veterinary products, and worked for the local Limburg television station TV Limburg.

== Political career ==
He was first elected to the House in the 2006 general election, and he focused on matters of agriculture, animal rights, small and medium enterprises, public transport, aviation and rail transport.

Graus secured a sixth term in November 2023, when the PVV received a plurality in a general election, and his portfolio includes animal welfare and NVWA. Through the backing of the PVV, a proposal passed the House in March 2024 to weaken an earlier amendment prescribing that animals should be able to exhibit natural behavior. Graus was the only member of his parliamentary group who voted in favor of an unsuccessful alternative proposal by the Party for the Animals (PvdD) that preserved the original amendment, which had been supported by the PVV in 2021, by defining natural behaviors. A motion by Graus and Ines Kostić (PvdD) was carried the same year urging the government to ban the trade and ownership of animals prohibited from breeding, such as pugs and Sphynx cats. He also proposed to neuter wolves, after the return of the species to the Netherlands had caused disturbances.

=== Controversy ===
In December 2006, stories in the Dutch media erupted accusing Graus of having a history of unpaid bills, fraud, lawsuits, disgruntled employers and abusive relations with women. The Dutch justice department later reported that three counts filed against Graus were dismissed, without going into details about the other accusations. In addition, the newspaper de Volkskrant on January 27, 2007 found several NRC allegations lacking substance e.g. the bills had been paid after all. The newspaper also reported that Graus had the full confidence of party leader Geert Wilders.

== Electoral history ==
Electoral history of Dion Graus
Year	Body	Party	Pos.	Votes	Result		Ref.
Year	Body	Party	Pos.	Votes	Party seats	Individual	Ref.
2006	House of Representatives	Party for Freedom	6	1,296	9	Won	
2010	House of Representatives	Party for Freedom	9	2,435	24	Won	
2012	House of Representatives	Party for Freedom	11	2,387	15	Won	
2017	House of Representatives	Party for Freedom	12	3,725	20	Won	
2021	House of Representatives	Party for Freedom	13	1,194	17	Won	
2023	House of Representatives	Party for Freedom	14	1,548	37	Won	
2025	House of Representatives	Party for Freedom	18	977	26	Won	
