= Frank Wassenberg =

Dutch politician

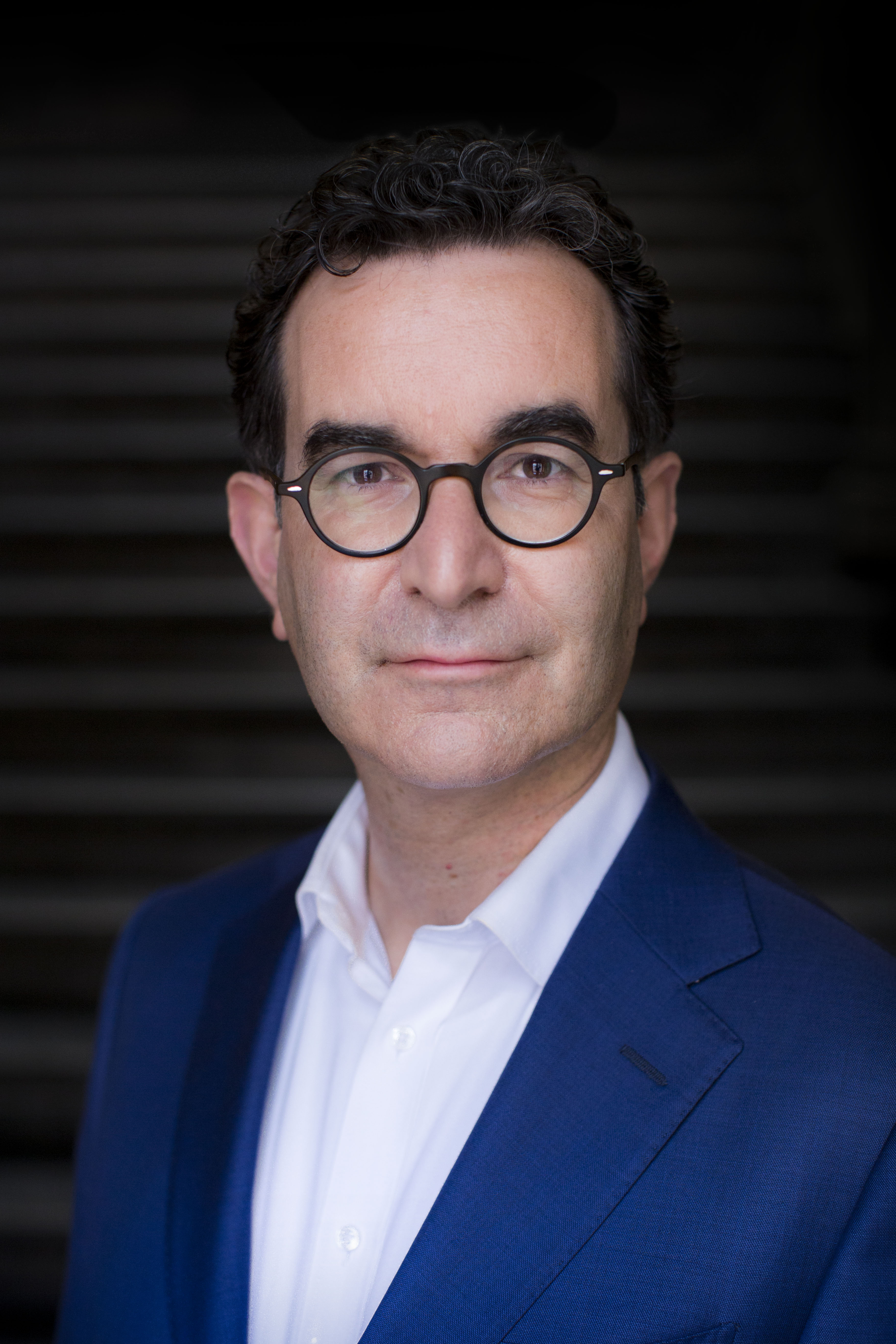
- Frank Wassenberg (2017)

Member of the House of Representatives
- In office 23 March 2017 – 5 December 2023
- In office 17 November 2015 – 18 October 2016

Member of the States of Limburg
- Incumbent
- Assumed office 26 March 2015
- In office 15 March 2007 – 11 March 2011

Personal details
- Born: 2 May 1966 (age 60) Heer, Netherlands
- Party: Party for the Animals
- Education: Utrecht University

Frank P. Wassenberg (born 2 May 1966) is a Dutch politician. He was a member of the House of Representatives for the Party for the Animals between November 2016 and October 2017 and between March 2017 and December 2023. He was the temporary replacement Esther Ouwehand in the former. He serves in the States of Limburg since the 2015 elections, and previously served between 2007 and 2011.

== Career ==
Wassenberg was born on 2 May 1966 in Heer, Maastricht. After completing his high school education in Maastricht in 1985 he went to study biology at Utrecht University and graduated in 1992. Since 1993 he has worked as a policy officer for various foundations for animal rights, since 2006 for the Koningin Sophia-Vereeniging tot Bescherming van Dieren.

Wassenberg was elected to the States of Limburg for the Party for the Animals in the 2007 elections. He served one four-year term. In the 2011 elections the party did not manage to obtain any seats. In the 2015 elections Wassenberg was once more elected to the States, as the sole representative of the party.

In November 2015 Esther Ouwehand temporarily resigned her seat in the House of Representatives for health reasons. Wassenberg became her replacement with an expected term of four months. He has been reappointed multiple times since the passing of the first four months.

In September 2016, Wassenberg missed a vote on a bill to reform Holland’s organ-donor system. The bill provided that, if a person does not specify “yes” or “no” on the form to donate organs upon one’s death, s/he will be registered as making “no objection” to organ donation; one could still change the “no objection” status later. If one remains registered as “no objection” at the time of death, the organs become available for donation — unless one’s close family member objects. The bill passed Holland’s lower house of parliament by a vote of 75 to 74.

Wassenberg had planned to vote against the bill: Although he and his party considered it “terribly important” for the country’s health services to attract more organ donors, he felt the bill encroached on people’s freedom of choice regarding their own bodies. Wassenberg admitted an “incredibly stupid mistake” in missing the vote: “I had an appointment outside The Hague, and then something went wrong with the timetable. The group tried to reach me, but I had my phone turned off during the conversation.”

Esther Ouwehand returned to the House of Representatives on 18 October 2016, ending Wassenberg's temporary replacement.

After the 2017 general election Wassenberg returned to the House, taking office on 23 March 2017. He lost his bid for re-election in November 2023, and his term ended on 5 December. Wassenberg ran for the European Parliament as his party's second candidate in June 2024, but his party secured only one seat.

== Electoral history ==
Electoral history of Frank Wassenberg
Year	Body	Party	Pos.	Votes	Result		Ref.
Year	Body	Party	Pos.	Votes	Party seats	Individual	Ref.
2010	House of Representatives	Party for the Animals	4	1,889	2	Lost	
2012	House of Representatives	Party for the Animals	3	2,677	2	Lost (Note: Wassenberg was appointed to the body later during the term due to a vacancy.)	
2017	House of Representatives	Party for the Animals	4	2,773	5	Won	
2021	House of Representatives	Party for the Animals	4	7,128	6	Won	
2023	House of Representatives	Party for the Animals	4	3,618	3	Lost	
2024	European Parliament	Party for the Animals	2	11,246	1	Lost	
2025	House of Representatives	Party for the Animals	48	521	3	Lost	
