= Animals' Party =

Animals' Party Djurens parti
- Abbreviation: DjuP or DP
- Leader: Simon Knutsson
- Secretary: Therese Ericsson
- Founded: 14 February 2014
- Dissolved: 14 July 2022
- Ideology: Animal rights
- Political position: Single-issue
- European affiliation: Animal Politics EU

Website
- djurensparti.se (archived)

Animals' Party (Swedish: Djurens parti; DjuP or DP) was an animal rights party in Sweden, founded on February 14, 2014. The party has participated in elections to the Riksdag and the European Parliament, but has not received enough votes to get any seats.

== History ==
The party was founded in 2014 as a reaction to parties calling for wolf hunting in order to decimate the presence of predator animals in Swedish forests. The party participated in the 2014 European Parliament election in Sweden, where it won 0.24% of the popular vote and no seat. In September of the same yeear, it also participated in the 2014 Swedish general election, where it won 0.07% of the popular vote and no seats. It joined Animal Politics EU, where along with the Animal Party of Cyprus, represents the single-issue faction of animal parties.

In its last Facebook post on 14 July 2022, the Animals' Party board announced that "the party has been put on pause."

== Ideology ==
The party declares itself to be a strictly 'animal protection' party, explicitly stating that its existence is based on it and all its proposals will focus on this issue. It was founded in reaction to parties that favored wolf hunting. The Animals' Party postulates reduced consumption of animal products in favor of veganism and vegetarianism, phasing out animal testing, stricter protection for predators such as wolves, reduced animal transports, restricting the use of animals in entertainment, increased protection for stray animals, and an EU-wide resolution on animal rights.

Describing its policial vision, the party declared:

Our policy is based on a vision of a society in which all individuals, regardless of their nature, are entitled to their own lives and are not exploited by man (…) Nevertheless, cultures have been built up with the idea that man is a superior and independent animal (…). Sweden should be a country where all knowing individuals have the same moral status regardless of age, ethnicity, gender, sexuality and species.

It declares itself to be neither right-wing nor left-wing, instead pursuing a strictly "people-centred approach" and a "distributive political mindset". It is considered a single-issue party. The party does not oppose Swedish membership in the EU, but is against the EU's subsidies to agriculture and fisheries, stating that instead of the subsidies going to "large-scale animal cruelty and overfishing", the EU should invest in sustainable solutions to the environment. The party also wants to halt the slaughter of rooster chicks, restricting animal use in circuces and zoos, protecting predator animals in Swedish forests. It also advocates a law requiring cats to be neutered, tagged and registered, as well as a law that would require every other meal in the public sector to be vegan or vegetarian.

== Election results ==
=== Riksdag ===
Year	Votes	%	Seats	+/–	Government
2014	4,093	0.07 (#13)	0 / 349	New	No seats
2018	3,648	0.06 (#16)	0 / 349	0	No seats

=== European Parliament ===
Year	Votes	%	Seats	+/–
2014	8,773	0.24 (#12)	0 / 20	New
2019	4,105	0.10 (#14)	0 / 20	0
