= Heer, Maastricht =

Coordinates: 50°50′26″N 5°43′37″E

Heer
- neighbourhood & former municipality
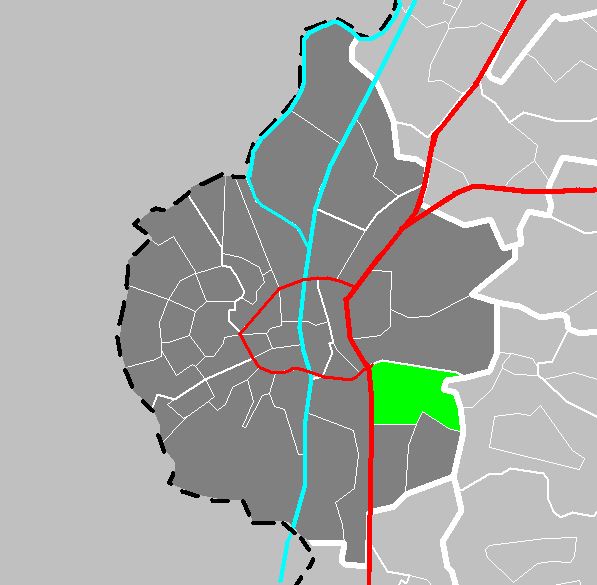
- Location of Amby in Maastricht
- Municipality: Maastricht
- Province: Limburg
- Country: Netherlands

Population
  - Total: 7,615

Heer is a neighbourhood of Maastricht, in the Dutch province of Limburg. Heer is a former municipality and village, incorporated into Maastricht in 1970 and, until 1828, this municipality was called "Heer en Keer". The municipality covered the former villages of Heer and Scharn. It is located on the right bank of the river Meuse.

== Impressions ==
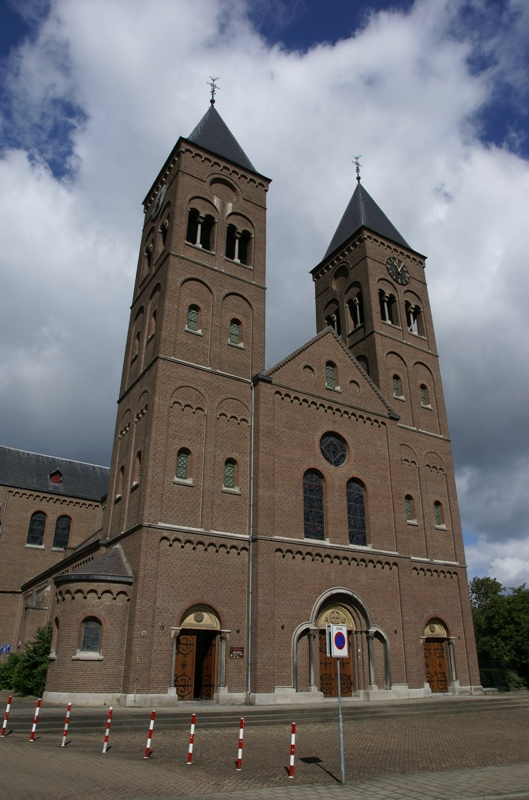
National monument 506637, St Petrus Banden Church

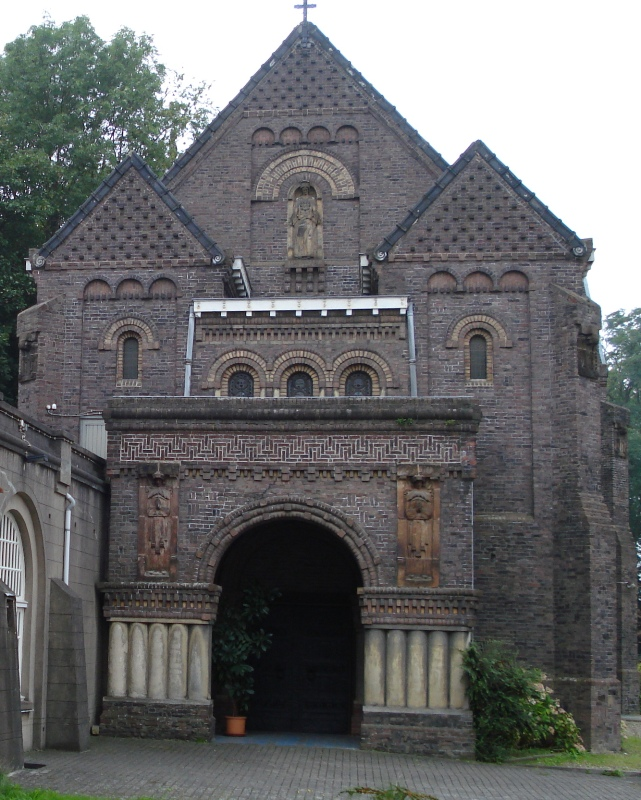
National monument 506693, chapel of the Opveld convent
