= Animal Politics EU =

Animal-rights European political alliance

- Abbreviation: APEU
- Founded: 2014
- Ideology: Animal rights Animal welfare
- Political position: Left-wing
- European Parliament group: The Left in the European Parliament
- Colours: Green
- European Parliament: 2 / 720 (0.3%)
- European Commission: 0 / 27 (0%)
- European Council: 0 / 27 (0%)
- European Lower Houses: 4 / 6,217 (0.06%)
- European Upper Houses: 1 / 1,459 (0.07%)

Website
- animalwelfareparty.org/euro-animal-7

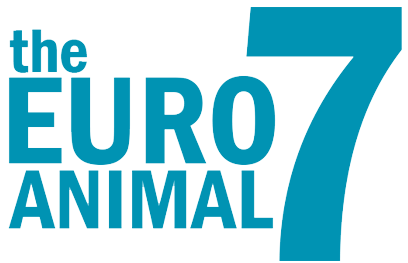
Former logo

Animal Politics EU, formerly Euro Animal 7, is an animal rights European political alliance.

== Ideology ==
Animal Politics EU is considered left-wing. The parties of Animal Politics EU take clear left-wing ideological positions, calling for enlargements of welfare systems, stressing the need to fight against social inequalities, and openly criticizing capitalism. The group believes in the need to regulate and limit capitalism and globalization, arguing that compassion to animals should extend to socio-economic issues, stating that there is a "moral obligation to protect or care for the weakest creatures and give ‘a voice to the voiceless ones’—not only animals but also human beings with severe restrictions, children, and possibly poor people and oppressed or discriminated minorities."

The group proposes a catalogue of policies that is shared by all of its member parteies, which include improving the legal status of all animals, redirecting EU subsidies away from livestock and fish farming, promoting plant-based lifestyle, phasing out genetically manipulated crops, ending farming practices that cause harm to animals, banning the export of live animals and animal experimentation, and abolishing legal protections and privileges to traditions that involve animal cruelty.

All parties of Animal Politics EU also share a rejection of speciesism, arguing that it is morally unjustifiable to exclude non-human animals and their suffering from moral considerations. The declarations of the group include: "the fight against all forms of discrimination, oppression and exploitation must be extended to the liberation of animals", "anthropocentrism and speciesism dominant in the history of civilization, allied to individual and collective egocentrism without any regard for the [animals] quality of living and sentient beings, have been causing a great ecological imbalance and enormous suffering", and "After the liberation of slaves and women, and giving rights to children, it is the next logical step to take the interests of animals seriously."

Group members call for:

- Raise the moral and legal status of animals
- Improve the welfare of animals kept for farming purposes and ensure proper enforcement of animal welfare legislation across all EU member states
- Phase out farming practices which are harmful to animals and re-direct EU subsidies away from the intensive livestock industry, into sustainable, plant-based and organic agriculture
- End the long-distance transport of live animals within and outside the EU
- Stop overfishing within and outside European waters
- Phase out animal testing with binding targets for reduction and replacement, combined with incentives for alternative testing methods
- End legal derogations and subsidies for so-called cultural and religious traditions that involve cruelty to animals, such as bullfighting, non-stun slaughter and foie gras production
- Fight the illicit trade of pets in the EU and halt the barbaric treatment of stray dogs and cats in Europe
- Implement a ban on hunting and prohibit the import of wildlife trophies
- Close all fur farms in Europe and ban fur imports from third countries
- Take hazardous pesticides and endocrine disrupting chemicals out of the market
- Combat climate change by supporting a shift towards a plant-based lifestyle
- Implementing a CO_{2} tax for companies and speeding up efforts to realise a complete switch to renewable energy
- Realise efficient, affordable and accessible public transport, as an alternative to air travel

== Member parties ==
Country	Party	Votes in last national parliament election	National MPs	2014 MEPs	Votes in European parliament election 2019	2019 result and MEPs	Votes in European parliament election 2024	2024 result and MEPs
Belgium	DierAnimal	10,341 (only in Antwerp)	0	0	606 (only in DG)	1.5%, 0	did not contest	
Cyprus	Animal Party Cyprus ^{‡}	did not contest	0	0	2,208	0.8%, 0	1,013	0.3%, 0
France	Animalist Party	did not contest	0	0	490,074	2.2%, 0	494,356	2.0%, 0
Finland	Animal Justice Party of Finland	3,378	0	0	2,917	0.2%, 0	did not contest	
Germany	Human Environment Animal Protection Party ^{‡}	482,201	0	1	542,226	1.4%, 1^{b}	570,498	1.4%, 1
Italy	Italian Animalist Party	21,451 (coalition in 3 out of 245 constituencies)	0	0	160,270	0.6%, 0	not part of Animal Politics EU	
Netherlands	Party for the Animals ^{‡}	219,371	3	1	220,938	4.0%, 1	279,239	4.5%, 1
Portugal	People–Animals–Nature (PAN) ^{‡}	86,930	1	0	167,130	5.5%, 1^{a}	48,033	1.2%, 0
Sweden	The Animals' Party ^{‡}	did not contest	0	0	4,105	0.1%, 0	did not contest	
Spain	Animalist Party with the Environment (PACMA) ^{‡}	169,237	0	0	294,657	1.3%, 0	134,425	0.8%, 0
United Kingdom	Animal Welfare Party ^{‡}	1,486 (4 out of 650 constituencies)	0	0	25,232	1.1% (only in London)	no longer in European Union	

^{‡} Founding parties of EuroAnimal 7.

== Notes ==
PAN's MEP resigned from the party in June 2020 and remained in the Greens/EFA parliamentary group as an independent MEP.
Tierschutzpartei's MEP resigned from the party in February 2020 and remained as a non-inscrit MEP.
