= Christine Teunissen =

Dutch politician (born 1985)

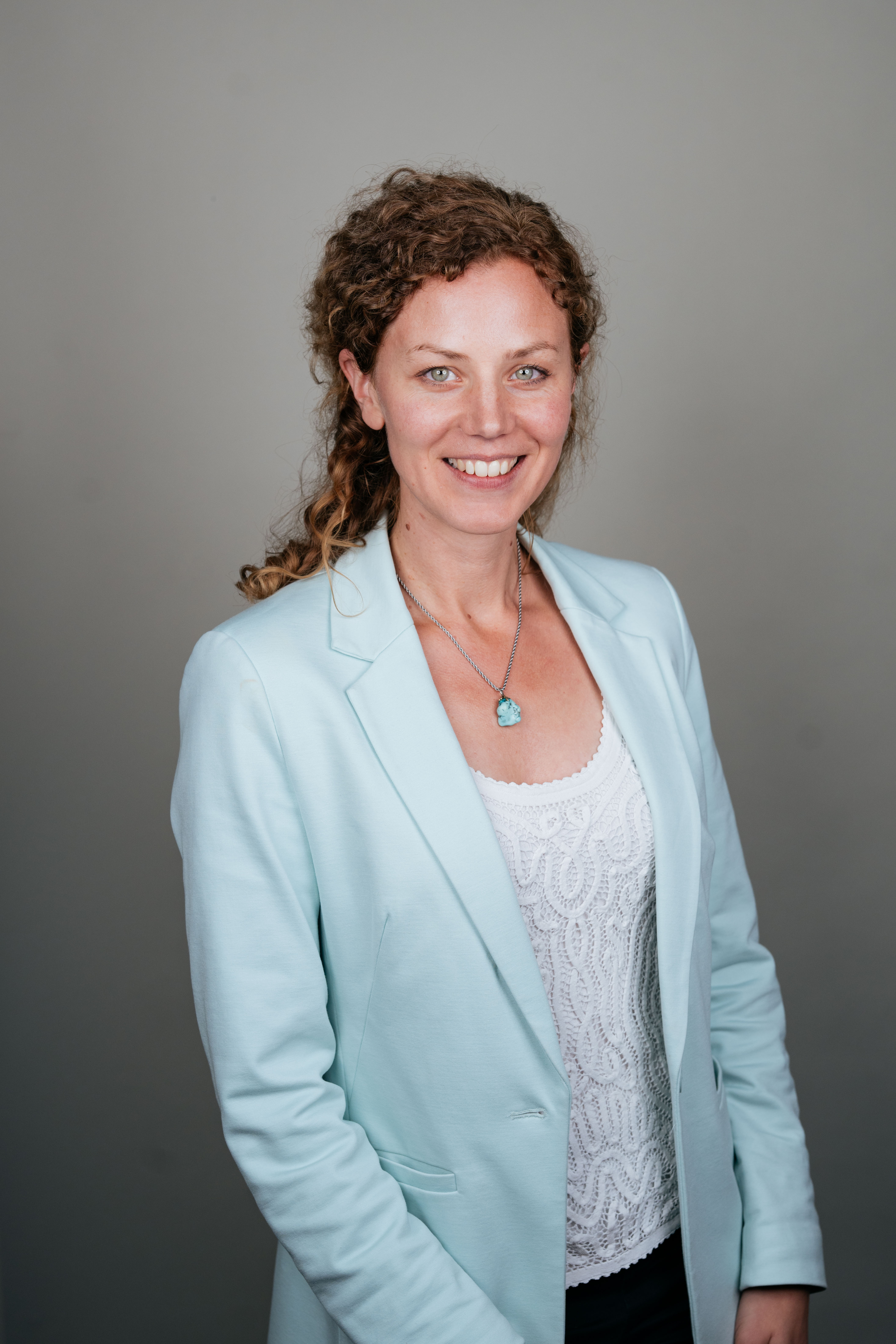
- Teunissen in 2023

Leader of the Party for the Animals
- Incumbent
- Assumed office 5 June 2026
- Preceded by: Esther Ouwehand

Leader of the Party for the Animals in the House of Representatives
- In office 13 October 2022 – 10 October 2023
- Preceded by: Esther Ouwehand
- Succeeded by: Esther Ouwehand
- Incumbent
- Assumed office 5 June 2026
- Preceded by: Esther Ouwehand

Member of the House of Representatives
- Incumbent
- Assumed office 31 March 2021

Member of the Senate
- In office 11 October 2018 – 31 January 2019
- In office 12 March 2019 – 31 March 2021

Member of the Municipal Council of The Hague
- In office 9 June 2015 – 10 October 2018
- In office 24 March 2014 – 11 October 2018

Personal details
- Born: 6 September 1985 (age 41) Leidschendam, Netherlands
- Party: Party for the Animals
- Education: Leiden University
- Occupation: Politician, Press secretary

Christine Teunissen (born 6 September 1985) is a Dutch politician of the Party for the Animals (PvdD), serving as the party's leader since June 2026.

== Biography ==
=== Education ===
Teunissen studied history at Leiden University.

=== Career ===
From 2012 to 2014, she was press secretary to the PvdD in the House of Representatives.

Since 24 March 2014 she has been a member of the municipal council of The Hague, and since 9 June 2015 she has also been a member of the Senate. She was the youngest one of that Senate session. In the senate elections of May 2019 she was reelected as a senate member.

From October 2018 to January 2019 she temporarily left the Senate to replace Marianne Thieme in the House of Representatives. In November 2020 the party published the list of candidates for the elections in March 2021. On this list Teunissen appeared as the number two, immediately after the former party leader Esther Ouwehand, and she was elected to the House of Representatives. Following her November 2023 re-election, she served as her party's spokesperson for economic affairs, finances, justice, foreign affairs, defense, and digital affairs. In January 2024, a motion by Teunissen was carried to block usage of Lelystad Airport for commercial aviation. It had been expanded to alleviate Amsterdam Airport Schiphol.

On 5 June 2026, she became the leader of the PvdD taking over from Esther Ouwehand.

== Electoral history ==
Electoral history of Christine Teunissen
Year	Body	Party	Pos.	Votes	Result		Ref.
Year	Body	Party	Pos.	Votes	Party seats	Individual	Ref.
2017	House of Representatives	Party for the Animals	7	4,458	5	Lost	
2021	House of Representatives	Party for the Animals	2	15,323	6	Won	
2023	House of Representatives	Party for the Animals	3	7,722	3	Won	
2024	European Parliament	Party for the Animals	39 (Note: Teunissen participated as a lijstduwer.)	762	1	Lost	
2025	House of Representatives	Party for the Animals	3	9,793	3	Won	
2026	The Hague Municipal Council	Party for the Animals	48	57	2	Lost	
