= Lammert van Raan =

Dutch politician (born 1962)

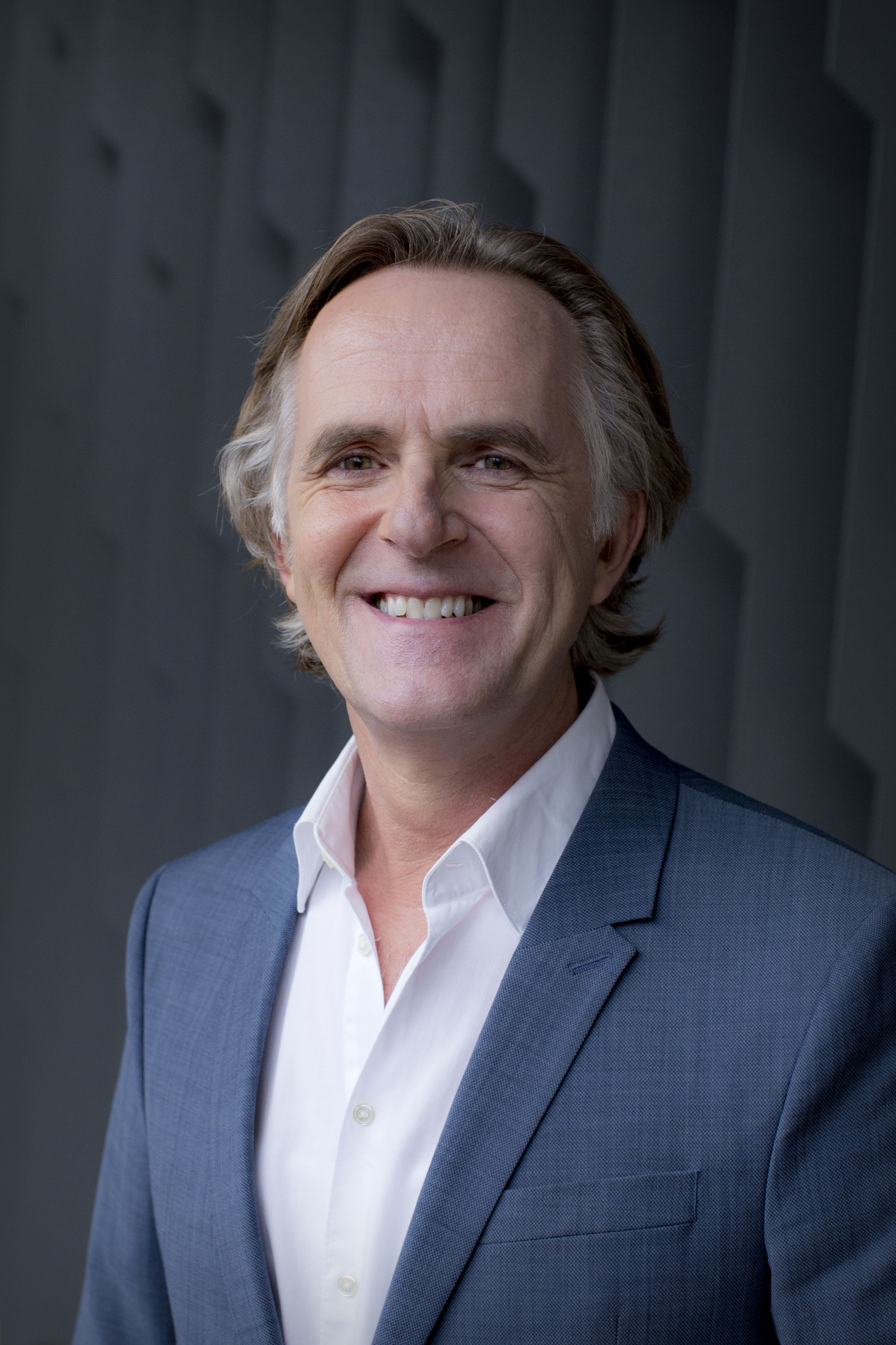

Member of the House of Representatives
- In office 22 March 2017 – 5 December 2023

Personal details
- Born: 3 February 1962 (age 64) Harlingen, The Netherlands
- Party: Party for the Animals
- Spouse: Lieke Keller

Lammert van Raan (born 3 February 1962) is a Dutch politician currently serving as a member of the House of Representatives. Previously, he served as member of the water board of Amstel, Gooi and Vecht and the municipal council of Amsterdam. In 2015, Van Raan joined the States-Provincial of North Holland, where he served as member until his election to the House of Representatives in 2017.

Van Raan, born in a family of entrepreneurs, originally supported the People's Party for Freedom and Democracy, but after his wife, Lieke Keller, co-founded the Party for the Animals (PvdD), he got more involved with left-wing politics and eventually joined the PvdD. A key reason for this switch was global warming, saying: "We're messing up the Earth, but I stay optimistic."

== Electoral history ==
Electoral history of Lammert van Raan
Year	Body	Party	Pos.	Votes	Result		Ref.
Year	Body	Party	Pos.	Votes	Party seats	Individual	Ref.
2010	Amsterdam Municipal Council	Party for the Animals	9	36	1	Lost	
2014	Amsterdam Municipal Council	Party for the Animals	2	184	1	Lost	
2014	European Parliament	Party for the Animals	4		1	Lost	
2015	Provincial Council of North Holland	Party for the Animals	2		3	Won	
2015	Amstel, Gooi en Vecht Water Council	Party for the Animals	1	28,102	3	Won	
2017	House of Representatives	Party for the Animals	3	2,529	5	Won	
2018	Amsterdam Municipal Council	Party for the Animals	17	105	3	Lost	
2019	Provincial Council of North Holland	Party for the Animals	21	172	3	Lost	
2019	Amstel, Gooi en Vecht Water Council	Party for the Animals	11	844	4	Lost	
2021	House of Representatives	Party for the Animals	5	3,464	6	Won	
2022	Amsterdam Municipal Council	Party for the Animals	25	111	3	Lost	
2023	House of Representatives	Party for the Animals	6	2,150	3	Lost	
