= Marianne Thieme =

Dutch animal rights activist and politician (born 1972)

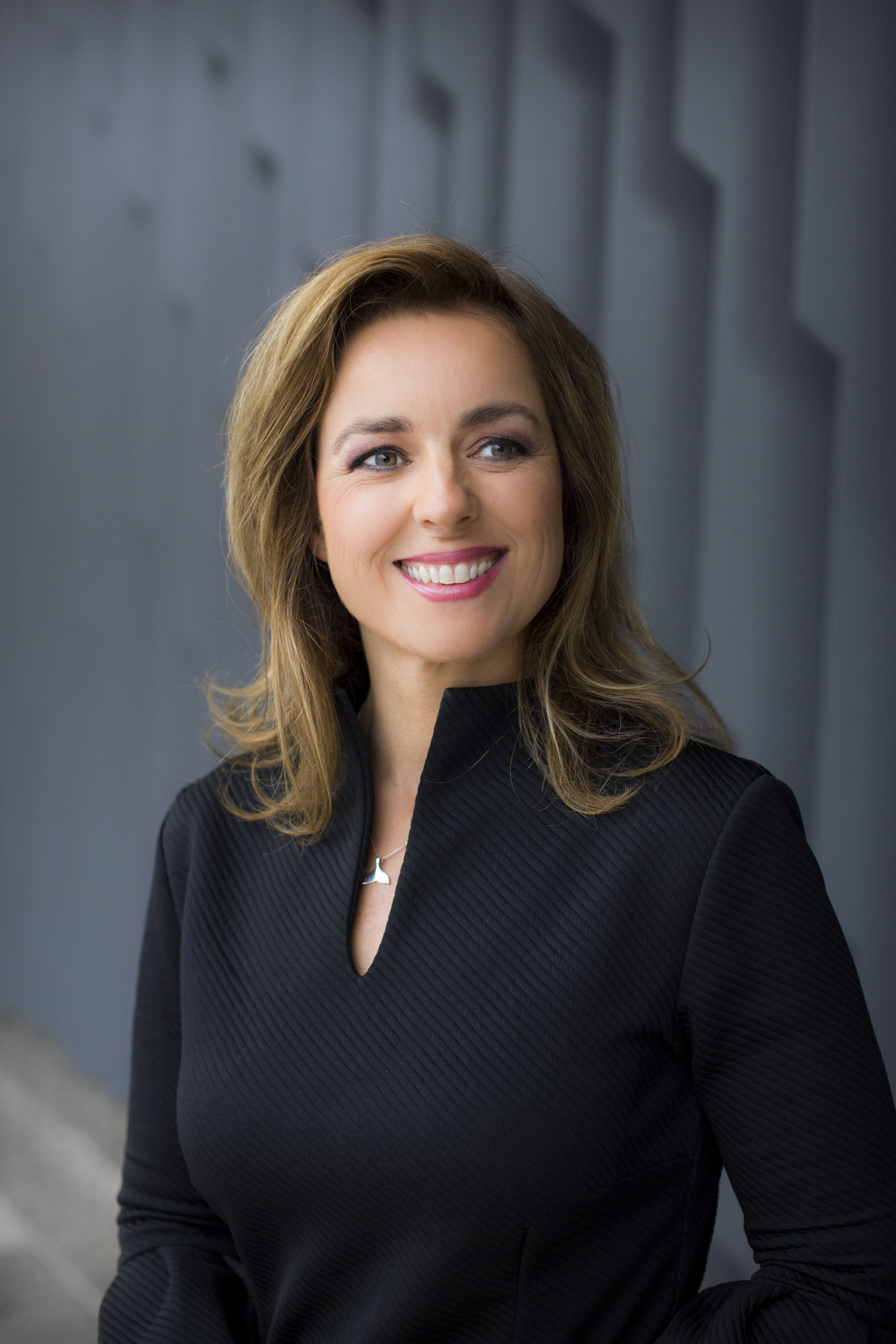

Leader of the Party for the Animals
- In office 28 October 2002 – 9 October 2019
- Preceded by: Position established
- Succeeded by: Esther Ouwehand

Leader of the Party for the Animals in the House of Representatives
- In office 30 November 2006 – 9 October 2019
- Preceded by: Position established
- Succeeded by: Esther Ouwehand

Member of the House of Representatives
- In office 30 November 2006 – 9 October 2019

Chairwoman of the Party for the Animals
- In office 28 October 2002 – 28 November 2010
- Preceded by: Position established
- Succeeded by: Luuk Folkerts

Personal details
- Born: Marianne Louise Thieme; 6 March 1972 (age 54) Ede, Netherlands
- Party: Party for the Animals
- Education: Erasmus University Rotterdam (LLM in administrative law), University of Wales Trinity Saint David (MA in theology).
- Occupation: Politician, animal rights activist, author
- Website: Worldlog
- Marianne Thieme's voice Recorded March 2017

Marianne Louise Thieme (Dutch pronunciation: [maːriˈjɑnə ˈtimə]; born 6 March 1972) is a Dutch politician, author and animal rights activist. A jurist and theologian by education, she served as the Party for the Animals' political leader from 2002 to 2019 and a member of the House of Representatives from 2006 to 2019.

== Early life and career ==
Thieme studied at Duno College in Doorwerth. After that she studied from 1991 to 1992 at the Sorbonne in Paris, France. From 1992 she studied law at Erasmus University Rotterdam with a specialization in administrative law. During this time she became a vegetarian. Her interest in animal rights motivated her to start studying law. Thieme graduated in 1997.

From 1998 to 2001 Thieme worked at research agency B&A Group in The Hague. Between 2001 and 2004 she was policy official at Bont voor Dieren (English: Fur for Animals), a Dutch anti-fur animal welfare foundation. Until November 2006 she was the general manager of Stichting Wakker Dier, a Dutch animal welfare foundation against industrial agriculture.

== Political career ==
In October 2002 Thieme and other animal protectionists founded the Party for the Animals (Partij voor de Dieren, PvdD). During the general election of 2003 the party gained 47,754 votes (0.5%), but not a seat in the House of Representatives which is obtained by 0.67% of the vote.

In February 2004 she was nominated to become the party's lijsttrekker for the 2004 European Parliament election. This time the party gained 153,432 votes (3.2%), three times as much as in the 2003 Dutch general election, but the number of votes was not enough to obtain a seat in the European Parliament.

In May 2014 the party got 200,254 votes (4.21%) for the 2014 European Parliament election, enough to obtain a seat in the European Parliament. However, it was not with Marianne Thieme as lijsttrekker, but Anja Hazekamp. Marianne Thieme was already elected to the House of the Representatives.

During the general election of 2006 the Party for Animals gained 179,988 votes (1.8%), enough for two seats in the lower house of the States General of the Netherlands. The party became the world's first party to gain parliamentary seats with an agenda focused primarily on animal rights. Marianne Thieme became an MP alongside Esther Ouwehand. At the general election of 2010 the party received 122,317 votes (1.3%) and its two MPs were reelected; two years later, with 182,162 votes (1.9%), the PvdD won two seats again. The party ran at the general election of 2017 with Thieme as lijsttrekker for the fifth time. With 335,214 votes (3.2%), it gained five seats.

Thieme always concludes her speeches in Parliament with the phrase "Voorts zijn wij van mening dat er een einde moet komen aan de bio-industrie." ("Furthermore we are of the opinion that factory farming has to be ended."), referring to Cato the Elder's famous conclusion of his speeches with Carthago delenda est.

On 8 October 2019, Thieme resigned from Parliament and her leadership of the PvdD. Esther Ouwehand replaced Thieme as party leader in the House of Representatives and Eva van Esch took her former seat in Parliament.

== Personal life ==
Thieme became a member of the Seventh-day Adventist Church in 2006 "because [it is] a church with compassion and care for our planet." It caused some controversy about its stance that "Adam and Eve were vegetarians"

She has a daughter (Annika, born 2002) and lives in Maarssen. On 6 November 2008, she married Jaap Korteweg, an organic farmer from Langeweg, with whom she had a second daughter (Amélie, born 2012). They divorced in 2017. In 2021 she married Ewald Engelen, with whom she has been in a relationship since 2018.

== Bibliography ==
In May 2004, Thieme's book De eeuw van het dier (The Century of the Animal) was published. Animal rights are the centre point of the text, which draws a line from the end of slavery through women's liberation to animal rights.

== See also ==
- List of animal rights advocates
- List of Dutch women writers
- List of Seventh-day Adventists
- List of vegetarians
