= Esther Ouwehand =

Dutch politician and marketing manager (born 1976)

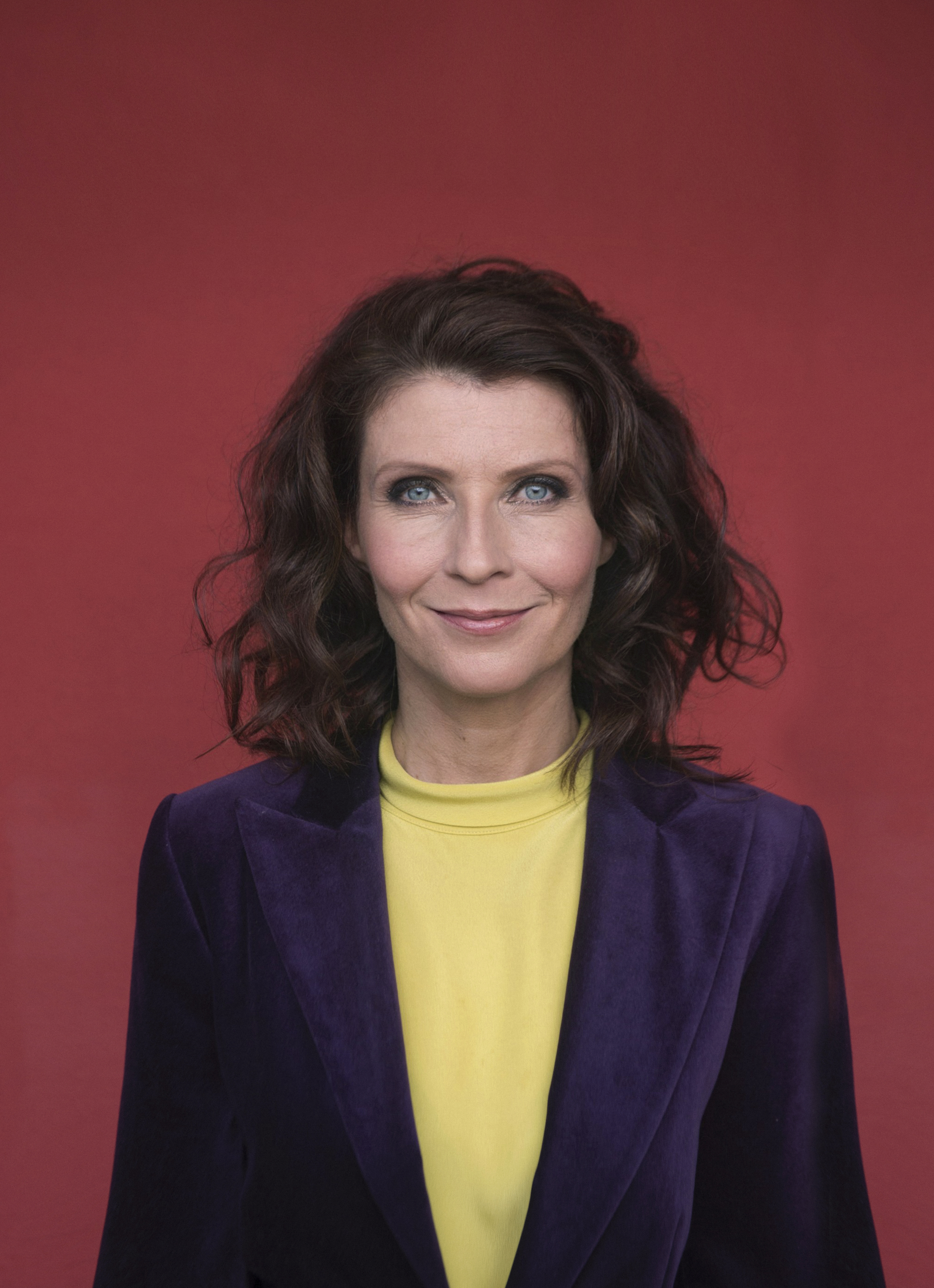
- Ouwehand in 2023

Leader of the Party for the Animals
- In office 9 October 2019 – 5 June 2026
- Preceded by: Marianne Thieme
- Succeeded by: Christine Teunissen

Leader of the Party for the Animals in the House of Representatives
- In office 9 October 2019 – 5 June 2026
- Preceded by: Marianne Thieme
- Succeeded by: Christine Teunissen

Member of the House of Representatives
- Incumbent
- Assumed office 2 February 2023
- In office 18 October 2016 – 12 October 2022
- In office 30 November 2006 – 17 November 2015

Personal details
- Born: 10 June 1976 (age 50) Katwijk, Netherlands
- Party: Party for the Animals (2002–present)
- Other political affiliations: GroenLinks (until 2001)
- Education: Vrije Universiteit Amsterdam (dropped out)
- Occupation: Politician; marketer
- Website: Party for the Animals

Esther Ouwehand (Dutch pronunciation: [ˈɛstər ˈʌuəɦɑnt]; born 10 June 1976) is a Dutch politician of the Party for the Animals (Dutch: Partij voor de Dieren, PvdD) in the House of Representatives. She served as the party leader from 2019 to June 2026, and has been a member of the House of Representatives since the 2006 election with two interruptions.

== Biography ==
=== Personal life ===
Esther Ouwehand attended secondary school in Katwijk, where she completed her vwo (Dutch pre-university education). She studied Policy, communication and organisation at the Vrije Universiteit Amsterdam, which she did not finish.

She was raised a Protestant but is currently an agnostic. She follows a fully plant-based diet and loves metal music, in particular stoner metal.

=== Career ===
Initially, Ouwehand did not consider a career in politics. She was a junior marketing manager for youth magazines at Sanoma before going into politics.

==== Party for the Animals ====
She joined the Party for the Animals in October 2002 and became the party's co-ordinator in 2004. She was responsible for managing the party's headquarters. She also co-authored the 2006 electoral program "220x liever..".

The general elections of 2006 were considered a great success for the party. The party gained 179,988 votes (1.8%), enough for two seats in the Dutch parliament. The party became the world's first party to gain parliamentary seats with an agenda focused primarily on animal rights.

She was second on the election list, right after party chairwoman Marianne Thieme. Consequently, she became a member of parliament, even though she received a total of 4.370 write-in votes, about a hundred less than lijstduwer Kees van Kooten, who received 4.479 votes. She was sworn in on 30 November 2006.

Contrary to her wishes, she was not initially placed on the election list for the general elections of 2010, but the party members voted her in second place, so she became re-elected.

Ouwehand temporarily resigned from the House on 17 November 2015 for health reasons and was replaced by Frank Wassenberg. She returned to the House on 18 October 2016.

On 8 October 2019, Ouwehand succeeded Marianne Thieme as parliamentary leader of the PvdD upon Thieme's retirement from the House of Representatives. She was the leader of the party in the 2021 House of Representatives elections. On 11 October 2022, she temporarily resigned her duties as MP and group chairman due to overwork, returning to the House of Representatives on 2 February 2023. Following her re-election in November 2023, she served as her party's spokesperson for agriculture next to her role as parliamentary leader.

== Electoral history ==
Electoral history of Esther Ouwehand
| Year | Body | Party | Pos. | Votes | Result | | Ref. |
| Year | Body | Party | Pos. | Votes | Party seats | Individual | Ref. |
|---|---|---|---|---|---|---|---|
| 2006 | House of Representatives | Party for the Animals | 2 | 4,370 | 2 | Won | |
| 2009 | European Parliament | Party for the Animals | 14 | 2,135 | 0 | Lost | |
| 2010 | House of Representatives | Party for the Animals | 2 | 12,713 | 2 | Won | |
| 2012 | House of Representatives | Party for the Animals | 2 | 11,573 | 2 | Won | |
| 2014 | Leiden Municipal Council | Party for the Animals | 13 | 129 | 1 | Lost | |
| 2014 | European Parliament | Party for the Animals | 12 | 3,292 | 1 | Lost | |
| 2015 | Provincial Council of South Holland | Party for the Animals | 19 | | 2 | Lost | |
| 2017 | House of Representatives | Party for the Animals | 2 | 18,936 | 5 | Won | |
| 2018 | Leiden Municipal Council | Party for the Animals | 10 | 357 | 3 | Lost | |
| 2019 | Provincial Council of South Holland | Party for the Animals | 20 | 3,013 | 2 | Lost | |
| 2019 | European Parliament | Party for the Animals | 20 | 11,215 | 1 | Lost | |
| 2021 | House of Representatives | Party for the Animals | 1 | 282,525 | 6 | Won | |
| 2023 | House of Representatives | Party for the Animals | 1 | 160,460 | 3 | Won | |
| 2024 | European Parliament | Party for the Animals | 41 (Note: Ouwehand participated as lijstduwer.) | 8,257 | 1 | Lost | |
| 2025 | House of Representatives | Party for the Animals | 1 | 134,446 | 3 | Won | |
| 2026 | The Hague Municipal Council | Party for the Animals | 49 | 194 | 2 | Lost | |

== See also ==
- List of animal rights advocates
