= Eva van Esch =

Dutch politician

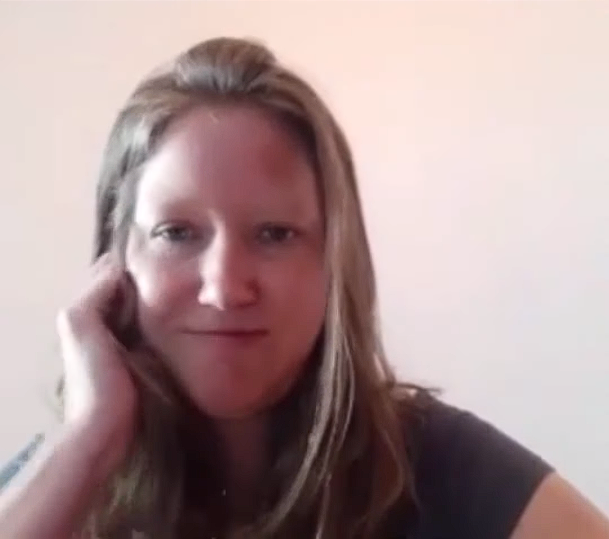
Van Esch in 2020

Eva Maria van Esch (born 12 May 1986 in Rossum) is a Dutch politician, who served as a Member of Parliament for the Party for the Animals (Dutch: Partij voor de Dieren, PvdD) between 2019 and 2023. She previously served as the party's parliamentary leader in the municipal council of Utrecht. Since March 2025 she has served as Alderman (wethouder) in the city of Arnhem.

== Political positions ==
Van Esch proposes that dogs should be allowed into hospitals to visit their owners' deathbeds, and should also be permitted into funeral homes to say a last goodbye. She favours tighter regulations for wood-burning.

== Electoral history ==
Electoral history of Eva van Esch
Year	Body	Party	Pos.	Votes	Result		Ref.
Year	Body	Party	Pos.	Votes	Party seats	Individual	Ref.
2021	House of Representatives	Party for the Animals	6	14,744	6	Won	
2024	European Parliament	Party for the Animals	38 (Note: Van Esch participated as a lijstduwer.)	880	1	Lost	
2025	House of Representatives	Party for the Animals	47	522	3	Lost	
2026	Arnhem Municipal Council	Party for the Animals	16	185	2	Lost	
