= Anja Hazekamp =

Dutch politician (born 1968)

Anja Hazekamp MEP
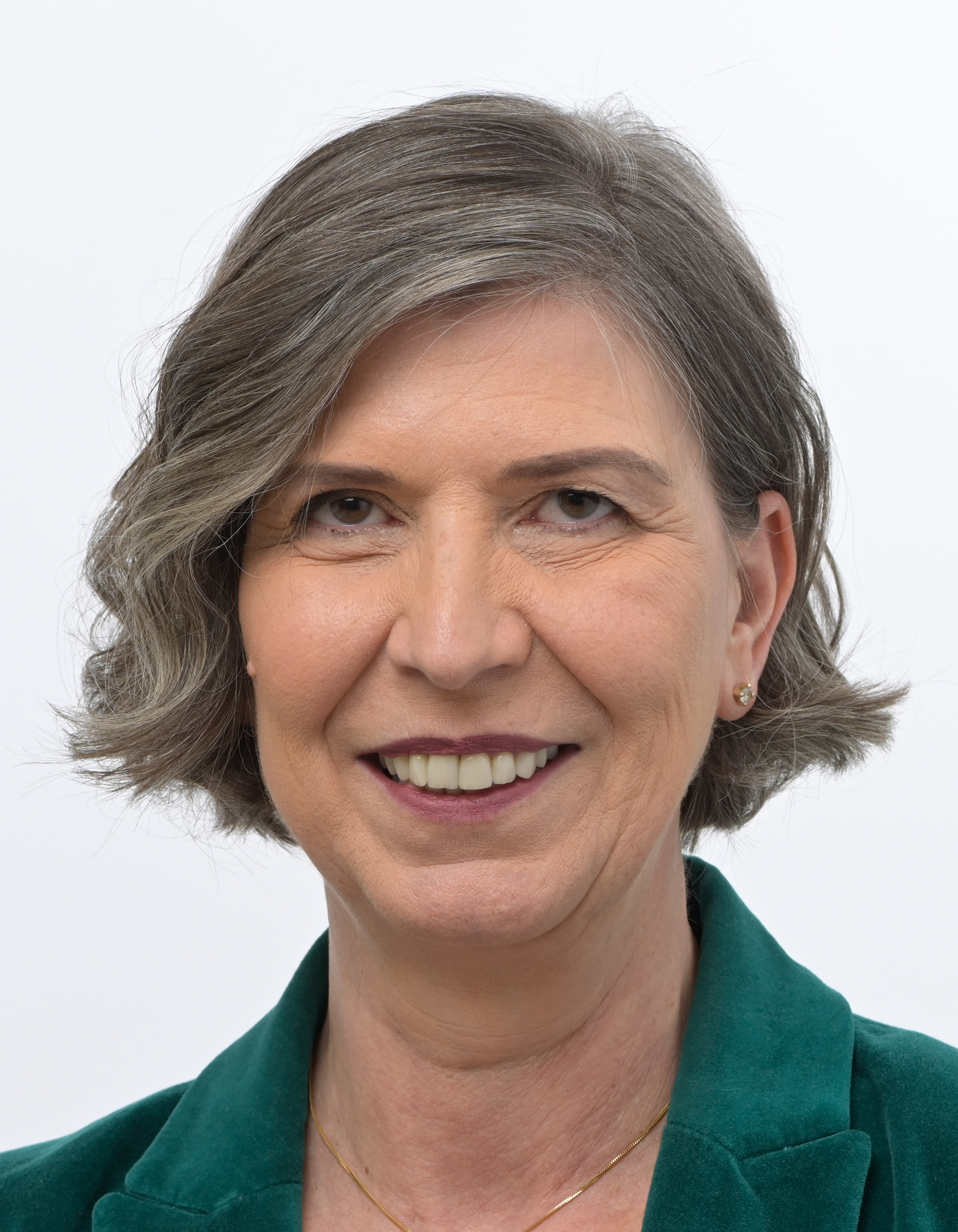
- Official portrait, 2024

Member of the European Parliament
- Incumbent
- Assumed office 1 July 2014
- Constituency: Netherlands

Member of the House of Representatives
- In office 24 January 2012 – 14 May 2012

Member of the States of Groningen
- In office 15 March 2007 – 25 June 2014

Personal details
- Born: 21 January 1968 (age 58) Vlagtwedde, Netherlands
- Party: (Netherlands) NL: Party for the Animals (European Union) EU: GUE-NGL
- Education: University of Groningen

Antje Anna Helena "Anja" Hazekamp (born 21 January 1968) is a Dutch politician and Member of the European Parliament (MEP) for the Netherlands. She is a member of the Party for the Animals, part of the European United Left–Nordic Green Left. Previously she was member of the House of Representatives of the Netherlands in 2012 and member of the States of Groningen between 2007 and 2014.

She has been a Member of the European Parliament since July 2014 and was reelected in 2019 and 2024.

== Career ==
She was born on 21 January 1968 in Vlagtwedde, she received her primary and secondary education in Ter Apel. Between 1988 and 1989 she studied to become a biology teacher in Leeuwarden. Afterwards she went to study biology at the University of Groningen, graduating in 1995.

Hazekamp worked as public relations official for the Dutch Society for the Protection of Animals between 1992 and 1997. She also worked as a scientific employee for two fauna related organisations in 1995–1997. She was employed by Utrecht University and Leiden University as a scientific employee on the issue of animal testing between 1997 and 2000. She returned to the Dutch Society for the Protection of Animals in 2000 and worked for five years as a policy employee. Afterwards she was employee by the Seal Rehabilitation and Research Centre as a policy employee until 2009. She became senior policy advisor for Stichting AAP, where she worked between 2009 and 2014.

== Political career ==
Hazekamp joined the Party for the Animals and was elected to the States of Groningen, where she served between 15 March 2007 and 25 June 2014. She replaced Marianne Thieme in the House of Representatives of the Netherlands between 24 January 2012 and 14 May 2012, when Thieme was on maternity leave.

== European Parliament ==
Hazekamp led the Party for the Animals list for the European Parliament elections of 2014, the party obtained one seat and Hazekamp was thus elected. The party received 4.2% of the votes thereby gaining the first seat in the European Parliament for the Party for the Animals in history. In the European Parliament elections of 2009 the party failed to gain a seat with 3.5% of the votes. During the run-up to the elections Hazekamp had stated that endless economic growth is impossible on a finite planet, and that it therefore should no longer be policy of the European Union. Hazekamp was reelected in the European Parliament elections of 2019.

In the European Parliament Hazekamp is a substitute member of the Committee on Agriculture and Rural Development and member of the Delegation for relations with Japan. She stated that on the Committee on Agriculture and Rural Development she wishes to further interest of animals, the environment and nature. During the campaign for the 2024 European Parliament election, newspaper Trouw noted the party's platform had become less Eurosceptic, seeing European cooperation as an important instrument to improve animal welfare. She was re-elected, as the Party for the Animals retained its seat, and she joined the bureau of The Left.

== Electoral history ==
Electoral history of Anja Hazekamp
Year	Body	Party	Pos.	Votes	Result		Ref.
Year	Body	Party	Pos.	Votes	Party seats	Individual	Ref.
2006	House of Representatives	Party for the Animals	8	517	2	Lost	
2009	European Parliament	Party for the Animals	3	2,883	0	Lost	
2010	House of Representatives	Party for the Animals	3	1,836	2	Lost	
2012	House of Representatives	Party for the Animals	4	1,575	2	Lost	
2014	European Parliament	Party for the Animals	1	131,093	1	Won	
2015	Provincial Council of Groningen	Party for the Animals	20	161		Lost	
2017	House of Representatives	Party for the Animals	29	447	5	Lost	
2019	European Parliament	Party for the Animals	1	136,224	1	Won	
2024	European Parliament	Party for the Animals	1	157,049	1	Won	
