= Party for the Animals =

Political party in the Netherlands

Party for the Animals Partij voor de Dieren
- Abbreviation: PvdD
- Leader: Christine Teunissen
- Chairman: Zwanny Naber
- Leader in the Senate: Ingrid Visseren-Hamakers (Note: The party is de facto represented in the Senate by the independent Visseren-Hamakers Group. The group using the name "Party for the Animals" (consisting of Peter Nicolaï and Niko Koffeman) cut its ties with the party in November 2025.)
- Leader in the House of Representatives: Christine Teunissen
- Leader in the European Parliament: Anja Hazekamp
- Founders: Marianne Thieme; Ton Dekker; Lieke Keller
- Founded: 28 October 2002
- Headquarters: Amsterdam
- Youth wing: PINK!
- Think tank: Nicolaas G. Pierson foundation
- Membership (2026): ▲33,556
- Ideology: Animal rights Animal welfare Anti-capitalism; Environmentalism
- Political position: Left-wing to far-left
- European Parliament group: The Left in the European Parliament
- European political alliance: Animal Politics EU
- Colours: Dark green
- Senate: 1 / 75
- House of Representatives: 3 / 150
- Provincial councils: 26 / 572
- European Parliament: 1 / 31

Website
- partijvoordedieren.nl www.partyfortheanimals.nl

The Party for the Animals (Dutch: Partij voor de Dieren [pɑrˈtɛi voːr də ˈdiːrə(n)], PvdD) is a political party in the Netherlands. Among its main goals are animal rights and animal welfare. The PvdD was founded in 2002 as a single-issue party for animal rights, opposing animal cruelty and the treatment of animals in agriculture. The party then developed into a left-wing, ecological party.

Since June 2026, the PvdD's political leader is Christine Teunissen. With 2.08% of the votes at the 2025 general election, the PvdD holds three of the 150 House of Representatives's seats. In the Senate, it has one of the 75 seats. PvdD holds 26 States-Provincial seats across all provinces. In the European Parliament, it has one of the 31 seats allocated to the Netherlands constituency.

== History ==
=== Founding ===
The First Balkenende cabinet was more hostile to animal welfare than the preceding Second Kok cabinet: it scrapped plans to ban mink farming, relaxed restrictions on hunting, and postponed regulations on factory farming. Cabinet party Pim Fortuyn List (LPF) pushed for these changes; Lieke Keller, director of the anti-fur farming organisation Bont voor Dieren ('Bont for animals'), interpreted these acts as trying to "get even" with activists following the assassination of Pim Fortuyn by environmental and animal rights activist Volkert van der Graaf. Despite their past support for animal welfare, GroenLinks and the Socialist Party (SP) did not vocally oppose the cabinet's animal policy. The cabinet was described as having rolled back 20 years of animal welfare progress. When a snap election was announced on 21 October 2002, Keller spoke with her colleague Marianne Thieme and suggested starting a party dedicated to animal rights. Thieme responded that she didn't believe in single-issue parties, but changed her mind on 24 October during a protest against seal hunting: "It's about an entire group of inhabitants being ignored, that's not a single issue". Thus, the Party for the Animals was founded and registered on 28 October 2002. The media did not pay attention to this, as it was focused on the LPF's internal struggles.

In the lead-up to the 2003 general election, the party faced the challenge of selecting a suitable lead candidate. While co-founder Lieke Keller was a natural candidate to lead, her existing role as director of Bont voor Dieren, and her extensive political contacts, made her unsuitable for front-line candidacy. To preserve ongoing lobbying efforts, Keller stepped back, and her colleague Thieme – a relatively unknown but committed figure – was selected as spokesperson. The party initially sought a celebrity to head the electoral list, but when this proved unfeasible, Thieme was put forward. Some founders saw the effort as a publicity stunt rather than a serious political bid. Niko Koffeman, who had previously overseen campaigns for the SP, nonetheless took an active role, shaping the party's program and advising on media outreach. As media attention grew, notably following an interview in Het Parool on 6 December 2002, Thieme's public profile grew. The campaign relied on securing free publicity.

The PvdD's campaign focused on a cluster of settlements in South Holland: Leiden, Warmond, Voorschoten, Oegstgeest, Jacobswoude and Hillegom. Despite modest resources, the party secured several hundred members and operated on a total budget of €30,000 – two-thirds of which came from hotelier Irene Visser. This was spent primarily on posters and flyers. However, an administrative error led to a significant setback: The PvdD's candidate list for Overijssel was submitted 40 minutes past the legal deadline, and although the documents had been faxed earlier, the Electoral Council and the Council of State both upheld the disqualification. As a result, the party was barred from competing in the province. Thieme criticised the ruling as excessively rigid and suggested that the presence of established parties within the Council of State might discourage political newcomers.

When votes were counted, the PvdD came just short of winning a parliamentary seat. Initial projections by most major media outlets showed the party below the threshold, though a Radio 1 forecast briefly placed it at one seat. Ultimately, the party received 47,754 votes – just 518 votes below the electoral threshold. This narrow margin raised questions about whether participation in Overijssel might have altered the result. Despite the disappointment, the party issued a statement expressing optimism, noting that such voter support was achieved with minimal resources, media exposure, and preparation. Party officials framed the outcome as evidence of latent public backing for a political movement grounded in animal liberation.

Although initially considered a testimonial party, a party which does not seek to gain political power but to testify its beliefs and thereby influence other parties, the party signalled its willingness to enter a coalition government in 2021. The party today is a part of the governing coalitions in the municipalities of Almere, Arnhem, and Groningen.

=== Electoral breakthrough ===
The electoral breakthrough for the PvdD occurred at the 2004 European elections. The party won 3.22% of the votes (153.432 votes), not enough to win a seat, but a sharp improvement compared to their 2003 result. In 2006 the party won their first seats in the Tweede Kamer, with Thieme and Esther Ouwehand being elected to parliament. The party gained a lot of attention due to a number of prominent lijstduwers, such as Paul Cliteur, Maarten 't Hart, Kees van Kooten, Rudy Kousbroek, Georgina Verbaan, and Jan Wolkers.

The Party won nine seats in eight provinces in the 2007 provincial elections, securing one seat in the Senate. In 2010, the party won representation on the local councils of Amsterdam, Rotterdam, Utrecht, Arnhem, Gouda, Vlagtwedde, and Pijnacker-Nootdorp; this meant that the PvdD secured representation on every level of government in the Netherlands.

In consequent elections, the electoral support for the PvdD remained relatively stable, winning two seats in the House of Representatives in 2010 and 2012. In 2014, the party won representation to the European parliament and joined the European United Left–Nordic Green Left parliamentary group.

In 2017, the party gained its best result to date, winning five seats in the Tweede Kamer. On 16 July 2019 Femke Merel van Kooten split from the PvdD parliamentary group and continued as an independent member of parliament. The reason for the split was that Van Kooten criticised the narrow political focus of the party, which in her opinion focused too much on ecology and animal rights.

=== Ouwehand leadership ===
On 8 October 2019, founder and longtime leader Thieme retired from the leadership and the Tweede Kamer. Ouwehand succeeded Thieme as parliamentary leader, and Eva van Esch replaced her as a member of parliament. She was previously a city council woman in Utrecht. In 2023, a power struggle emerged between Ouwehand and the party board, which resulted in the party board resigning.

=== Teunissen Leadership ===
On 5 June 2026, Ouwehand stepped down as leader to focus on two bills, an anti-factory farm bill and a bill for reducing animal suffering during slaughter. Ouwehand handed the leadership over to Christine Teunissen.

== Ideology ==
Their main aim is to improve the life of animals and nature as a whole. They see the constant emphasis on economic growth as one of the main reasons for the lack of animal rights and is to blame for the state that nature currently is in. They want animal rights to be enshrined in the constitution. It is firmly on the left side of the political spectrum, considered an either a left-wing or a far-left party. It has also been described as a radical left.

The party has also have widened its scope to more than just animal rights, for example sustainability, healthcare, housing and more. It also strives for a shorter workweek and for a universal basic income. The economical demands of the party include a "radical greening" (Dutch: radicale vergroening) of the economy.

The Party for the Animals opposes capitalism and calls for a different economic system; this is combined with the party's support of degrowth, writing: "growth does not bring the solution but the problems" and "growth is an untenable concept on a globe that does not grow with it." It was also described as socialist. Conversely, in its program, the party argues that the neoliberal economic policies are destructive and a "system change" is needed in order to build a more inclusive and equal society.

In regards to the European Union, the PvdD is considered soft Eurosceptic. It rejected the European Constitutional Treaty and the Treaty of Lisbon. Regarding the European Union, the party argues that "Europe is not a federal state and it is not desirable or necessary to strive for it". Its approach has been described as very similar to that of the Dutch Socialist Party; PvdD supports a "less Europe, less market" approach, stating that financial crises in the EU are abused to lead to "the further transfer of sovereignty to the European Commission" and to force a European federation on member states by claiming that it is a financial necessity. The party criticizes the European internal market, arguing that its liberalization has gone too far and proposing policies that would limit the market in favour of member states' financial sovereignty. The party also notes that that the EU only focuses on the financial aspect, forcing its members to reduce financial deficits but overlooking ecological abuse. Political scientists Simon Otjes and Gerrit Voerman write that the PvdD takes a far-left position on the EU, opposing it as a capitalist project.

Other proposals of the party include:

- lowering the voting age to 16;
- introducing direct democracy through establishment of regular consultative referendums;
- shortened required notification period for protests and citizens' initiative;
- strict ethical and privacy scrutiny to automatized or AI-based systems;
- direct election of water boards instead of being chosen indirectly via municipal councils;
- universal housing program.

== Allied organisations ==
=== PINK! ===
PINK! is the youth wing of the PvdD. It was established on 12 September 2006, and has slightly over 2,000 members (2021 figure). The name is derived from the Dutch word for a cow that is older than a calf, but not yet fully mature. The current chairperson is Bob Steenmeijer, who succeeded Manuela Rot in 2024.

=== Nicolaas G. Pierson Foundation ===
The Nicolaas G. Pierson Foundation is the research department of the PvdD. Founded in 2007, it is named after Niek Pierson, a Dutch economist and an early political donor of the party.

=== Animal Politics EU ===
Initially founded as Euro Animal 7, Animal Politics EU is an informal grouping of animal rights based political parties within the European Union. Animal Politics EU has member parties in the Netherlands, Belgium, Cyprus, France, Germany, Italy, Portugal, Sweden, and Spain. The group currently has one MEP: Anja Hazekamp of the PvdD. Martin Buschmann for the Human Environment Animal Protection Party was formerly an MEP in this group but is no longer as of 2020.

== Electorate ==
The electorate of the PvdD consists in majority of women (estimated at 70%) living in urban areas. In 2023 the party achieved its best results in Amsterdam (11.5%), Arnhem (8.8%), Bergen (8.3%), Haarlem (9.8%), Nijmegen (9.3%), Schiermonnikoog (9%) and Zutphen (8.7%). The party has lowest support in rural areas with large agricultural industries, such as in the Bible belt. It is supported by many organic farmers, and positions itself as a farmer's party which wants to free farmers from the big agricultural companies and their lobbyists, and help farmers transition to organic farming.

The PvdD has the largest proportion of vegan/vegetarian voters of any political party in the Netherlands, with 17.3% or 27.9% of PvdD voters in saying in two surveys in 2021 that they did not eat meat. The party with the second-highest proportion of vegan/vegetarian voters in both surveys was GroenLinks, for which the share laid at 8.4% or 16.9%.

In 2021, a survey by Katholiek Nieuwsblad found that Catholic voters make up greater share of the PvdD's electorate than those of denominationally Christian parties such as CDA, ChristenUnie, and SGP. According to the Nieuwsblad's survey, Catholic voters tend to avoid denominationally Protestant or interconfessional parties and vote for strictly Catholic or secular ones in greater numbers instead. The newspaper also claimed that the voting behaviour of the PvdD and the SP is remarkably often in line with the moral views of the Catholic Church, and that "the social teachings of the Church are more progressive than is often thought". The former leader of the party, Marianne Thieme, often made appeals to Christian voters.

== Electoral results ==
=== House of Representatives ===
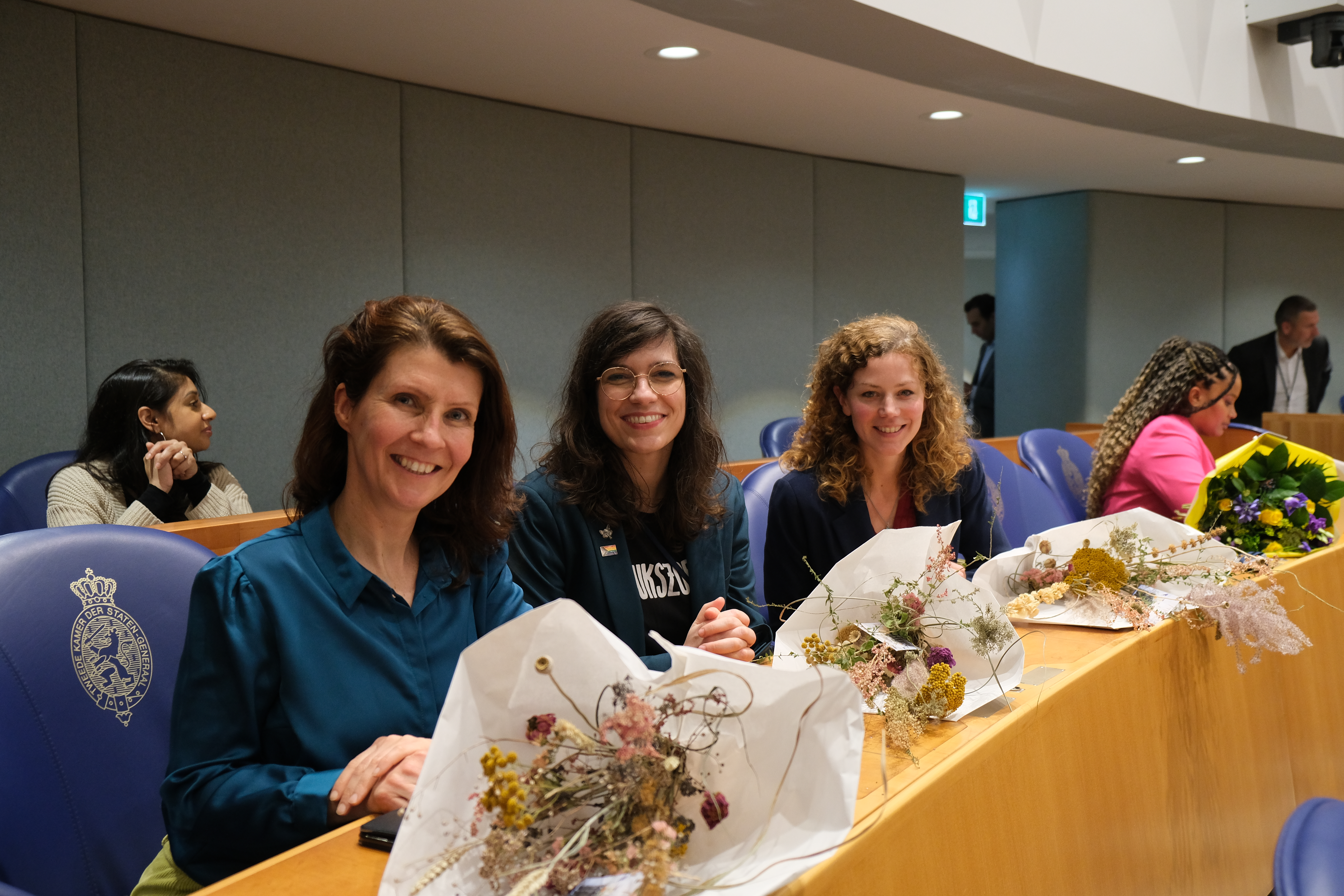
The 3 members of the House of Representatives (2023–present)

Election	Lead candidate	List	Votes	%	Seats	+/–	Government
2003	Marianne Thieme	List	47,754	0.49	0 / 150	New	Opposition
2006	Marianne Thieme	List	179,988	1.83	2 / 150	▲2	Opposition
2010	Marianne Thieme	List	122,317	1.30	2 / 150	0	Opposition
2012	Marianne Thieme	List	182,162	1.93	2 / 150	0	Opposition
2017	Marianne Thieme	List	335,214	3.19	5 / 150	▲3	Opposition
2021	Esther Ouwehand	List	399,750	3.84	6 / 150	▲1	Opposition
2023	Esther Ouwehand	List	235,148	2.25	3 / 150	▼3	Opposition
2025	Esther Ouwehand	List	219,371	2.08	3 / 150	0	Opposition

=== Senate ===
Election	List	Votes	%	Seats	+/–
2007	List	3,366	2.06	1 / 75	New
2011	List	2,177	1.06	1 / 75	Steady
2015	List	6,073	3.16	2 / 75	▲1
2019	List	6,550	3.78	3 / 75	▲1
2023	List	8,560	4.78	3 / 75	0

=== European Parliament ===
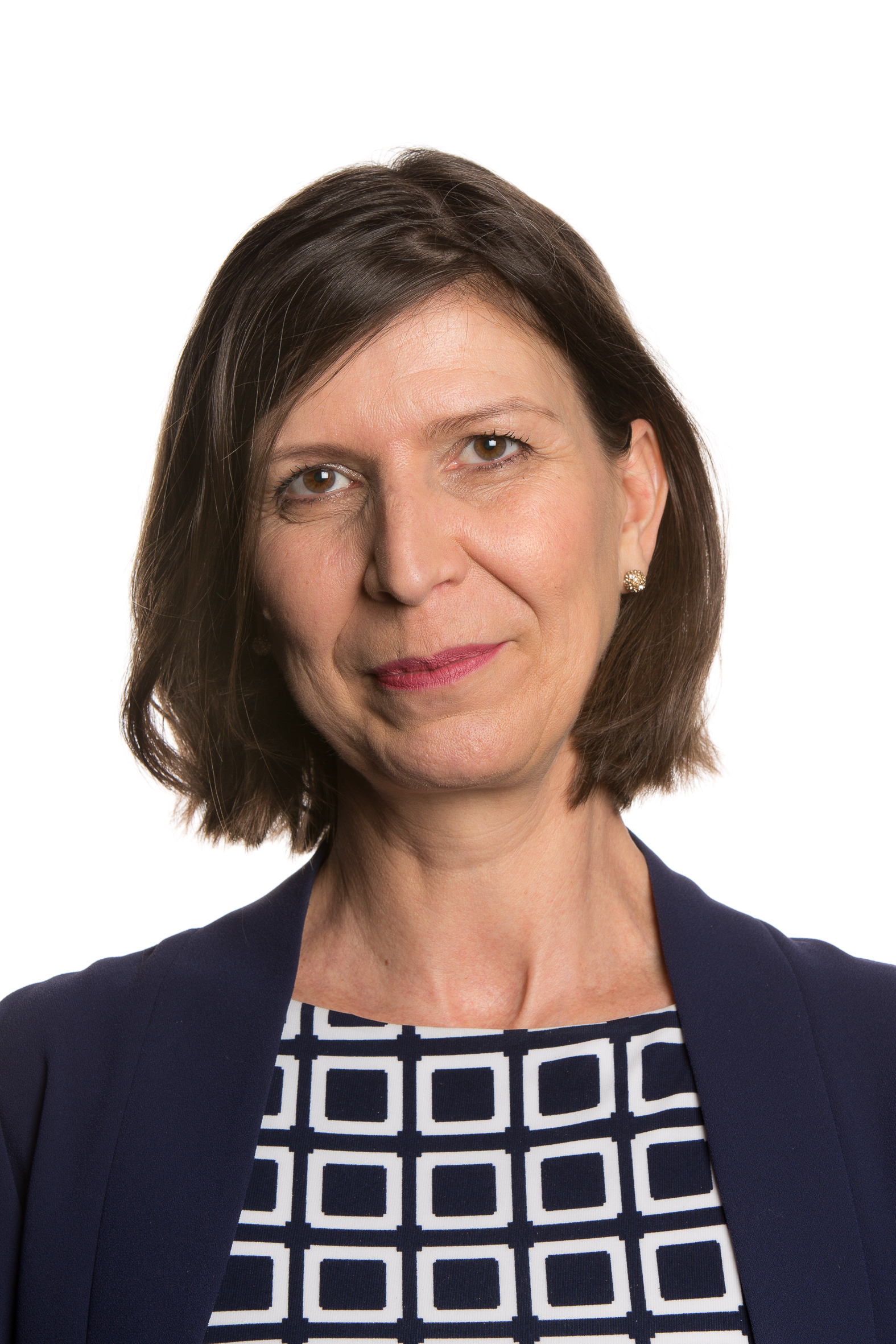
Anja Hazekamp, Leader in the European Parliament since 2014

Election	List	Votes	%	Seats	+/–	EP Group
2004	List	153,432	3.22	0 / 27	New	–
2009	List	157,735	3.46	0 / 25	0	–
2009	List	157,735	3.46	0 / 26	0	–
2014	List	200,254	4.21	1 / 26	▲1	GUE/NGL
2019	List	220,938	4.02	1 / 26	Steady	GUE/NGL
2019	List	220,938	4.02	1 / 29	0	GUE/NGL
2024	List	281,600	4.52	1 / 31	0	The Left

=== Provincial ===
Election	Votes	%	Seats	+/–
2007	144,132	2.55	9 / 564	
2011	131,231	1.88	7 / 566	▼2
2015	210,113	3.46	18 / 570	▲11
2019	317,103	4.36	20 / 570	▲2
2023	359.804	4.7	26 / 572	6

=== Municipalities ===
At the 2022 Dutch municipal elections, the PvdD won 63 seats, gaining representation in 29 municipalities. Party-wise, they have the most seats (four) in Leiden, Nijmegen, and Groningen.

== Representation ==
=== Members of the European Parliament ===
The MEPs of the Party for the Animals are part of the European United Left–Nordic Green Left Group in the European parliament.

== See also ==
- List of animal advocacy parties
