= List of members of the European Parliament for the Netherlands, 2024–2029 =

In the parliamentary term from 16 July 2024 until 2029, 34 people have been representatives of the Netherlands in the European Parliament. 31 were elected after the 2024 European Parliament election in the Netherlands and were installed at the start of the term.

After the elections, the national parties joined political groups in the European Parliament. The largest delegation, political alliance GroenLinks–PvdA (GL-PvdA, 8 seats), later known as Progressief Nederland (PRO), divided itself, with members from the Labour Party (PvdA) joining Progressive Alliance of Socialists and Democrats (S&D) and members from GroenLinks (GL) joining the Greens–European Free Alliance (Gr/EFA). Volt Netherlands (Volt, 2 seats) also joined the Gr/EFA. The Party for Freedom (PVV, 6 seats), joined the newly created Patriots for Europe. The People's Party for Freedom and Democracy (VVD, 4 seats) and Democrats 66 (D66, 3 seats) remained in Renew Europe (Renew). Christian Democratic Appeal (CDA, 3 seats) was joined by Farmer–Citizen Movement (BBB, 2 seats) and New Social Contract (NSC, 1 seat) in the European People's Party Group (EPP). Party for the Animals (PvdD, 1 seat) remained in The Left in the European Parliament – GUE/NGL (GUE/NGL) and the Reformed Political Party (SGP, 1 seat) in the European Conservatives and Reformists (ECR).

Geert Wilders (PVV) and Hedy d'Ancona (GL-PvdA) were elected based on preference votes, but refused their appointment.

== List ==
Name	National party	EP Group	Begin date (Note: Within this parliamentary term. Membership of previous terms is not included.)	End date (Note: Within this parliamentary term. Membership of later terms is not included.)	Ref.
Mieke Andriese	PVV	PfE	20 November 2025		
Malik Azmani	VVD	Renew	16 July 2024		
Jeannette Baljeu	VVD	Renew	16 July 2024		
Tom Berendsen	CDA	EPP	16 July 2024	22 February 2026	
Brigitte van den Berg	D66	Renew	16 July 2024		
Rachel Blom	PVV	PfE	16 July 2024		
Anouk van Brug	VVD	Renew	16 July 2024		
Mohammed Chahim	PvdA (Note: Until 12 February 2025)	S&D	16 July 2024		
Mohammed Chahim	GL/PvdA (Note: Between 13 February 2025 and 12 June 2026)	S&D	16 July 2024		
Mohammed Chahim	PRO (Note: Starting 13 June 2026) (Note: Formally cancelled membership around 30 September 2026)	S&D	16 July 2024		
Catarina Vieira	GL	Gr/EFA	16 July 2024		
Catarina Vieira	GL/PvdA	Gr/EFA	16 July 2024		
Catarina Vieira	PRO	Gr/EFA	16 July 2024		
Ton Diepeveen	PVV	PfE	16 July 2024		
Marieke Ehlers	PVV	PfE	16 July 2024		
Bas Eickhout	GL	Gr/EFA	16 July 2024	20 June 2026	
Bas Eickhout	GL/PvdA (Note: Starting 13 February 2025)	Gr/EFA	16 July 2024	20 June 2026	
Raquel Garcia Hermida-van der Walle	D66	Renew	16 July 2024		
Gerben-Jan Gerbrandy	D66	Renew	16 July 2024		
Dirk Gotink	NSC (Note: Until 7 October 2026)	EPP	16 July 2024		
Dirk Gotink	Independent (Note: Starting 7 October 2026)	EPP	16 July 2024		
Bart Groothuis	VVD	Renew	16 July 2024		
Anja Hazekamp	PvdD	Left	16 July 2024		
Ufuk Kâhya	PRO	Gr/EFA	3 July 2026		
Willemien Koning-Hoeve	CDA	EPP	3 March 2026		
Sebastian Kruis	PVV	PfE	16 July 2024		
Ingeborg ter Laak	CDA	EPP	16 July 2024		
Reinier van Lanschot	Volt	Gr/EFA	16 July 2024		
Jessika van Leeuwen	BBB	EPP (Note: Until 10 March 2026)	16 July 2024		
Jessika van Leeuwen	BBB	ECR (Note: Since 10 March 2026)	16 July 2024		
Jeroen Lenaers	CDA	EPP	16 July 2024		
Marit Maij	PvdA	S&D	16 July 2024		
Marit Maij	GL/PvdA	S&D	16 July 2024		
Marit Maij	PRO	S&D	16 July 2024		
Thijs Reuten	PvdA	S&D	16 July 2024		
Thijs Reuten	GL/PvdA	S&D	16 July 2024		
Thijs Reuten	PRO	S&D	16 July 2024		
Bert-Jan Ruissen	SGP	ECR	16 July 2024		
Sander Smit	BBB	EPP (Note: Until 10 March 2026)	16 July 2024		
Sander Smit	BBB	ECR (Note: Since 10 March 2026)	16 July 2024		
Kim van Sparrentak	GL	Gr/EFA	16 July 2024		
Kim van Sparrentak	GL/PvdA	Gr/EFA	16 July 2024		
Kim van Sparrentak	PRO	Gr/EFA	16 July 2024		
Sebastiaan Stöteler	PVV	PfE	16 July 2024	11 November 2025	
Tineke Strik	GL	Gr/EFA	16 July 2024		
Tineke Strik	GL/PvdA	Gr/EFA	16 July 2024		
Tineke Strik	PRO	Gr/EFA	16 July 2024		
Anna Strolenberg	Volt	Gr/EFA	16 July 2024		
Lara Wolters	PvdA	S&D	16 July 2024		
Lara Wolters	GL/PvdA	S&D	16 July 2024		
Lara Wolters	PRO	S&D	16 July 2024		
Auke Zijlstra	PVV	PfE	16 July 2024		
