= List of Party for Freedom members of the European Parliament =

This is a list of all (former) members of the European Parliament for the Party for Freedom (PVV).

== List ==
Name	Start date	End date	Ref.
Mieke Andriese	20 November 2025		
Rachel Blom	16 July 2024		
Louis Bontes	14 July 2009	17 June 2010	
Ton Diepeveen	16 July 2024		
Marieke Ehlers	16 July 2024		
André Elissen	13 June 2017	2 July 2019	
Marcel de Graaff	1 July 2014	1 July 2019	
Marcel de Graaff	1 February 2020	20 January 2022	
Lucas Hartong	22 June 2010	30 June 2014	
Hans Jansen	1 July 2014	5 May 2015	
Patricia van der Kammen	27 September 2012	1 July 2014	
Sebastian Kruis	16 July 2024		
Barry Madlener	14 July 2009	20 September 2012	
Vicky Maeijer	1 July 2014	15 March 2017	
Laurence Stassen	14 July 2009	21 May 2014	
Daniël van der Stoep	14 July 2009	1 September 2011	
Sebastiaan Stöteler	16 July 2024	11 November 2025	
Olaf Stuger	1 July 2014	2 July 2019	
Auke Zijlstra	13 September 2011	30 June 2014	
Auke Zijlstra	7 September 2015	1 July 2019	
Auke Zijlstra	16 July 2024		
