= List of candidates in the 2024 European Parliament election in the Netherlands =

The 2024 European Parliament election for the delegation from the Netherlands was held on 6 June 2024. 31 seats were divided between the 20 parties that participated.

== Participating parties ==
Candidate lists for the 2024 European Parliament election in the Netherlands
List		English translation	List name (Dutch)
1	list	GROENLINKS / Labour Party (PvdA)	GROENLINKS / Partij van de Arbeid (PvdA)
2	list	VVD	VVD
3	list	CDA - European People's Party	CDA - Europese Volkspartij
4	list	Forum for Democracy	Forum voor Democratie
5	list	D66	D66
6	list	Party for the Animals	Partij voor de Dieren
7	list	50PLUS	50PLUS
8	list	PVV (Party for Freedom)	PVV (Partij voor de Vrijheid)
9	list	JA21	JA21
10	list	NL PLAN EU	NL PLAN EU
11	list	Christian Union	ChristenUnie
12	list	Reformed Political Party (SGP)	Staatkundig Gereformeerde Partij (SGP)
13	list	BBB	BBB
14	list	More Direct Democracy	Meer Directe Democratie
15	list	SP (Socialist Party)	SP (Socialistische Partij)
16	list	vandeRegio	vandeRegio
17	list	Volt Netherlands	Volt Nederland
18	list	Belang Van Nederland (BVNL)	Belang Van Nederland (BVNL)
19	list	NSC	NSC
20	list	Pirate Party - The Greens	Piratenpartij - De Groenen

== Party lists ==
=== GROENLINKS / Labour Party (PvdA) ===
Candidate list for GroenLinks–PvdA
Number	Candidate	Preference votes	Result
1	Bas Eickhout	676,268	Elected
2	Mohammed Chahim	65,274	Elected
3	Marit Maij	182,317	Elected
4	Kim van Sparrentak	128,336	Elected
5	Tineke Strik	46,348	Elected
6	Thijs Reuten	10,135	Replacement
7	Lara Wolters	39,881	Elected
8	Ufuk Kahya	15,590	Replacement
9	Elmar Smid	6,505	
10	Catarina Vieira	31,929	Elected
11	Femke Brouwer	14,441	
12	Sinan Özkaya	6,540	
13	Ralph du Long	8,470	
14	Marius Troost	5,086	
15	Jolein Baidenmann	8,222	
16	Lara Sibbing	10,537	
17	Max van den Berg	16,026	
18	Kenville Kleinmoedig	6,068	
19	Hedy d'Ancona	21,633	Elected, but declined
20	Anna Koolstra	14,822	
Total		1,314,428	

=== VVD ===
Candidate list for People's Party for Freedom and Democracy
Number	Candidate	Preference votes	Result
1	Malik Azmani	351,733	Elected
2	Bart Groothuis	107,714	Elected
3	Jeannette Baljeu	91,653	Elected
4	Lennart Salemink	10,371	
5	Alisha Müller	13,562	
6	Fabiènne Hendricks	27,495	
7	Bart Millenaar	6,215	
8	Ellen Boelema	6,557	
9	Anouk van Brug	31,569	Elected
10	Marco Smit	6,394	
11	Björn de Groot	2,094	
12	Pieter-Bas van Suijlichem	3,104	
13	Sander Janssen	8,489	
14	Jacques Michél Bloi	1,561	
15	Anna-Chistina Gräfin von der Schulenburg	5,081	
16	Erik Becker	2,634	
17	Marlou van Beek	4,680	
18	Gé Overdevest	2,035	
19	Pepijn van den Hoogenband	2,506	
20	Francine Heijnen	3,688	
21	André Schuurman	1,660	
22	Erik Sjoers	1,930	
23	Roeland van der Zee	2,883	
24	Alexander Bakker	1,412	
25	Frederik Peters	1,620	
26	Richard van Scherpenzeel	1,882	
27	Jeroen Willem Klomps	1,060	
28	Casper Sonderen	5,559	
Total		707,141	

=== CDA - European People's Party ===
Candidate list for Christian Democratic Appeal
Number	Candidate	Preference votes	Result
1	Tom Berendsen	366,454	Elected
2	Ingeborg ter Laak	63,860	Elected
3	Jeroen Lenaers	55,781	Elected
4	Willemien Koning-Hoeve	15,613	Replacement
5	Sjoerd Wijnsma	17,650	
6	Gerben Horst	2,260	
7	Merel Balduk	10,231	
8	Robbert van Eerd	2,098	
9	Suzanna Broekhuizen	6,186	
10	Arjan Tolkamp	5,828	
11	Leo van Gelder	2,197	
12	Bert Sonneveld	2,322	
13	Johan van Slooten	1,272	
14	Lily Maaref	3,902	
15	Niek Wijmenga	1,289	
16	Chris Wouters	3,793	
17	Joëlle Cueche Hernandez	1,309	
18	Veerle Bens	2,606	
19	Rody van der Pouw Kraan	888	
20	Reinette Gjaltema-Van der Laan	2,700	
21	Judith Compagner	2,567	
22	André Poortman	2,373	
23	Elies Lemkes-Straver	1,618	
24	Kevin Klinkspoor	3,765	
25	Iris Bouwers	3,166	
26	Hilde Palland	2,500	
27	Jo-Annes de Bat	4,977	
Total		589,205	

=== Forum for Democracy ===
Candidate list for Forum for Democracy
Number	Candidate	Preference votes	Result
1	Ralf Dekker	111,052	
2	Freek Jansen	2,954	
3	Pepijn van Houwelingen	13,100	
4	Massimo Etalle	690	
5	Marco van den Boomgaard	492	
6	Jelena Postuma	2,209	
7	Johan Dessing	290	
8	Theo Heller	350	
9	Milan Schenk	247	
10	Brent Hadderingh	159	
11	Hans van de Breevaart	328	
12	Erik Hoogzand	179	
13	Ardi Oostdijk	370	
14	Ksenija Provoost	194	
15	Vincent Vos	362	
16	Bren de Hartog	171	
17	Frits Fiene	81	
18	Hans Hodde	63	
19	Shahin Akasi	162	
20	Joshua Kop	190	
21	Cathy Averdieck	109	
22	Roberto Haak	223	
23	Edwin Bonninga	170	
24	Vera Lubbers	222	
25	Ruby Driessen	252	
26	Anton van Schijndel	79	
27	Joris van den Oetelaar	215	
28	Sid Lukkassen	237	
29	Paul Cliteur	480	
30	Gideon van Meijeren	5,743	
31	Thierry Baudet	13,814	
Total		155,187	

=== D66 ===
Candidate list for Democrats 66
Number	Candidate	Preference votes	Result
1	Gerben-Jan Gerbrandy	253,866	Elected
2	Raquel García Hermida-van der Walle	100,504	Elected
3	Brigitte van den Berg	46,436	Elected
4	Ellen Mok	34,464	
5	Susanne Caarls	10,516	
6	Leonne van Vlimmeren	3,383	
7	Jasper Veen	2,059	
8	Laura de Vries	11,702	
9	Anita Pannebakker	4,529	
10	Emma Laurijssens-van Engelenhoven	7,184	
11	Pepijn Pi Van de Venne	5,352	
12	Martijn Huysmans	1,841	
13	Karin Jacobs	1,509	
14	Hendri Nortier	766	
15	Anne Schuurmans	2,506	
16	Melih Uzun	1,802	
17	Robin van Leijen	926	
18	Maarten Tollenaar	1,803	
19	Liesbeth Krol	1,355	
20	Fons Cazius	687	
21	Stefan Pack	213	
22	Caecilia Johanna van Peski	2,889	
23	Daniëlle van Hulst	735	
24	Amine Oulad Lmaroudia	2,305	
25	Jane Arifa Badoella	804	
26	Jolanta Polomski	907	
27	Marije Dijksma	3,699	
28	Christiaan de Vries	1,142	
29	Stef Smits	1,357	
30	Rutger Schonis	929	
31	Yassmine El Ksaihi	1,325	
32	Michiel Rijsberman	542	
33	Alexandra van Huffelen	3,760	
34	Kajsa Ollongren	9,853	
Total		523,650	

=== Party for the Animals ===
Candidate list for Party for the Animals
Number	Candidate	Preference votes	Result
1	Anja Hazekamp	157,049	Elected
2	Frank Wassenberg	11,246	
3	Mandy Ligthart	11,769	
4	Johnas van Lammeren	3,592	
5	Ellen Putman	10,009	
6	Ronan van Langen	10,448	
7	Vivian de Hoogh	10,429	
8	Wesley Pechler	1,308	
9	Kelli Tiggelman	2,393	
10	Wouter Kraidy	1,206	
11	Iris Dicke	8,257	
12	Jules Vaessen	1,169	
13	Jesse Luijendijk	845	
14	Jesseka Batteau	2,112	
15	Trees Janssens	1,263	
16	Siska Peeks	1,420	
17	Kıvılcım Pınar	3,930	
18	Carla van Viegen	1,069	
19	Nicole Dick	1,514	
20	Erik Lu	1,124	
21	Gaby Markandu	7,644	
22	Xenia Minnaert	5,237	
23	Kirsten Weitering	2,490	
24	Yuri Zandwijken	714	
25	Charlotte van Gemeren	1,229	
26	Ewout van Hoek	1,053	
27	Nayra van Lubek	905	
28	Merel Muller	1,766	
29	Tim Feij	394	
30	Elsa Miedema	541	
31	Niek Brunninkhuis	279	
32	Ronnie Koop	575	
33	Esther Groenewegen	972	
34	Erwin Scheijde	314	
35	Onno Loonstra	182	
36	Barbara Stok	2,084	
37	Eva Akerboom	626	
38	Eva van Esch	880	
39	Christine Teunissen	762	
40	Ines Kostić	2,544	
41	Esther Ouwehand	8,257	
Total		281,600	

=== 50PLUS ===
Candidate list for 50PLUS
Number	Candidate	Preference votes	Result
1	Adriana Hernández Martínez	33,085	
2	Gerrit-Jan van Otterloo	3,779	
3	Bennie van Est	2,481	
4	Arnold van Strien	1,085	
5	Chris Nyqvist	505	
6	Marinus Kasteleijn	1,318	
7	Klaas Hamersma	1,103	
8	Jan van der Starre	879	
9	Henk van Tilborg	1,013	
10	Anne Marie Fischer-Otten	2,295	
11	Jan van der Heijden	790	
12	Mieke Hoek	806	
13	M.P. Hornis	305	
14	Hilde Onderdijk	540	
15	Ruud van Acquoij	365	
16	Frans Dellaert	366	
17	Ger Konings	290	
18	Anneke van der Helm	435	
19	Edmond van Ooijen	333	
20	Anton van Straten	247	
21	Joke Bouwmeester	467	
22	Peter Jong	373	
23	Jojo Mulder	352	
24	Alfons Leerkes	112	
25	Frans Mol	256	
26	Frits de Wolff	173	
27	Chris Veeze	171	
28	John van Loon	235	
29	Frans Erkamp	224	
30	Jan Frans Brouwers	161	
31	Willem Bakx	136	
32	Theo Weijers	251	
33	Ab Wissingh	256	
34	Herman Nota	243	
35	Frans Vriens	138	
36	Volken de Jong	122	
37	Rob Hompe	146	
38	Harry Claassen	82	
39	Willy Bronckers	177	
40	Tineke Bulder	218	
41	Jan Hendriks	129	
42	Huib Fienieg	131	
43	Geert Tomlow	49	
44	Henry Liebregts	78	
45	Joost Aerts	161	
46	Bernard Revet	101	
47	Agnes Timmers-Van Dijk	326	
48	Gerard van Hooft	89	
49	Willem Dekker	81	
50	Martin van Rooijen	1,040	
Total		58,498	

=== PVV (Party for Freedom) ===
Candidate list for Party for Freedom
Number	Candidate	Preference votes	Result
1	Sebastiaan Stöteler	546,868	Elected
2	Marieke Ehlers	56,682	Elected
3	Auke Zijlstra	24,318	Elected
4	Sebastian Kruis	9,243	Elected
5	Rachel Blom	16,359	Elected
6	Ton Diepeveen	5,590	Replacement
7	Mieke Andriese	3,861	Replacement
8	Arthur van Angeren	11,815	
9	Jeroen de Bruijn	4,662	
10	Rowan Dekker	6,708	
11	Koen Cornelissen	6,248	
12	Nick Kaptheijns	1,402	
13	Menno Ludriks	7,114	
14	Nathalie Choenni	3,298	
15	Ashwin van Stormbroek	2,331	
16	Daniël de Moel	2,536	
17	Robert Housmans	5,825	
18	Nicole Moinat	4,837	
19	Tessa Dulfer	3,609	
20	Geert Wilders	334,356	Elected, but declined
Total		1,057,662	

=== JA21 ===
Candidate list for JA21
Number	Candidate	Preference votes	Result
1	Michiel Hoogeveen	24,612	
2	Don van Doorn	918	
3	Gert Heijkoop	460	
4	Maike Manon Damen-Flobbe	2,616	
5	Philippe Schyns	507	
6	Marcus Breet	231	
7	Inge-Marie de Boer	980	
8	Martijn Walraven	393	
9	Stijn Hesselink	477	
10	Michiel Janssen	282	
11	Max Kruijf	477	
12	Stijn van Ede	198	
13	Jean Wanningen	264	
14	Annabel Nanninga	2,161	
15	Joost Eerdmans	5,994	
Total		40,570	

=== NL PLAN EU ===
Candidate list for Nederland met een Plan
Number	Candidate	Preference votes	Result
1	Kok Chan	5,190	
2	Jinling Li	1,262	
3	René Groeneveld	353	
4	Kimbel Bouwman	160	
5	Ricky Bakker	135	
6	Johan Nix	106	
7	Jessy Bakker	674	
8	Mitchell Marijt	91	
9	Youri Bleeker	96	
10	Jesse Fennema	293	
Total		8,360	

=== Christian Union ===
Candidate list for Christian Union
Number	Candidate	Preference votes	Result
1	Anja Haga	139,520	
2	Anne Strijker	8,000	
3	Alette van Kralingen-Paul	3,041	
4	Johanna Koffeman-Kramer	2,530	
5	Wouter Jan de Graaf	1,763	
6	Ineke Schaddelee-van Bodegraven	1,595	
7	Christian van der Krift	1,008	
8	Annelle van der Wel	2,429	
9	Erwin de Pagter	872	
10	Klariska ten Napel	1,598	
11	Martine Wursten-Koekoek	1,458	
12	Judith Koop	2,357	
13	Bert van der Woerd	549	
14	Simone Kennedy	1,032	
15	Eppo Bruins	1,075	
16	Johanna van der Meer-van Hoven	530	
17	Paul Blokhuis	3,510	
18	Stieneke van der Graaf	3,537	
19	Joël Voordewind	3,656	
Total		180,060	

=== Reformed Political Party (SGP) ===
Candidate list for Reformed Political Party
Number	Candidate	Preference votes	Result
1	Bert-Jan Ruissen	194,433	Elected
2	Harold Hooglander	2,037	
3	Lourens van Bruchem	1,100	
4	Arnold Versteeg	1,684	
5	Mark Brouwer	1,969	
6	Nathanaël Middelkoop	3,835	
7	Gijsbrecht Gunter	492	
8	Henri Bisschop	1,248	
9	Gerben Heldoorn	721	
10	Breunis van de Weerd	806	
11	Kees Knulst	483	
12	Lambert Polinder	756	
13	Jacques Rozendaal	377	
14	Harry van der Maas	473	
15	Richard Tiemstra	386	
16	Rody van Heijst	103	
17	Henk van der Wind	419	
18	Maarten Slingerland	452	
19	Evert-Jan Brouwer	189	
20	Tom Bakker	310	
21	Jan Noeverman	647	
22	Jan-Bert Heinen	488	
23	Bennie Wijnne	412	
24	Henk Jan van Schothorst	312	
25	Peter Hoek	189	
26	Tom Koekoek	504	
27	Jan Hartog	185	
28	Florian Pronk	575	
29	Henk Massink	157	
30	Hans Keuken	294	
31	Geert Kraaijeveld	613	
32	Walter Jordaan	136	
33	Jan Schippers	278	
34	Kees Vermaat	458	
35	Arnoud Hotting	189	
36	Jan Baijense	277	
37	Henk van den Berge	106	
38	Roelof Bisschop	667	
39	Kees van der Staaij	9,276	
Total		228,036	

=== BBB ===
Candidate list for Farmer–Citizen Movement
Number	Candidate	Preference votes	Result
1	Sander Smit	218,669	Elected
2	Jessika van Leeuwen	43,868	Elected
3	Eveline Herben	8,134	
4	Gerlof Bierma	7,850	
5	Milou Rietjens	16,515	
6	Robin Martens	1,094	
7	Cees Meeldijk	6,488	
8	Hans Geurts	6,384	
9	Henk Hazenoot	2,186	
10	Klaas-Jan de Ruiter	1,545	
11	Anja Keuter-Kapitein	3,590	
12	Rob Vierhout	427	
13	Anoek de Lange	2,270	
14	Paul Kortekaas	1,590	
15	Rogier van Eldert	491	
16	Joost Schepel	346	
17	Jan Brouwer	3,019	
18	Mariska Rikkers-Oosterkamp	4,127	
19	Nicole Egelmeers	3,009	
20	Eddie van Marum	2,860	
21	Bert Boerland	2,491	
Total		336,953	

=== More Direct Democracy ===
Candidate list for More Direct Democracy
Number	Candidate	Preference votes	Result
1	Dorien Rookmaker	3,712	
2	Hester Bais	6,113	
3	Simone van Breda	809	
4	Paula Bouwer	265	
5	Afryea Uiterloo	396	
Total		11,295	

=== SP (Socialist Party) ===
Candidates for the European Parliament from the SP
SP candidates 1989	(1989)
SP candidates 1994	(1994)
SP candidates 1999	(1999)
SP candidates 2004	(2004)
SP candidates 2009	(2009)
SP candidates 2014	(2014)
SP candidates 2019	(2019)
SP candidates 2024	(2024)

Candidate list for Socialist Party
Number	Candidate	Preference votes	Result
1	Gerrie Elfrink	69,808	
2	Fenna Feenstra	30,643	
3	Bram Roovers	3,823	
4	Anne Cramer	4,131	
5	Vera Inekci	1,505	
6	Ben van Gils	400	
7	Anne-Marie Mineur	1,370	
8	Meltem Okcu	2,372	
9	Oscar van Raak	1,407	
10	Sebastiaan van den Hout	277	
11	Janet Ramesar	1,103	
12	Michel van Winden	158	
13	Emin Başoğlu	1,583	
14	Heidi Bouhlel-Lascaris	451	
15	Jamila Yahyaoui	3,051	
16	Debbie van Dijk	1,884	
17	Denise van Sluijs	613	
18	Ger van Unen	487	
19	Vincent Mulder	953	
20	Meta Meijer	287	
21	Thom Smit	2,686	
22	Tiers Bakker	684	
23	Marieke Alleman	313	
24	Peter Kwint	1,131	
25	Bob Ruers	997	
26	Jorge Wolters Gregório	634	
27	Paul Geurts	706	
28	Lisanne Zandvliet-Oldenkamp	1,202	
29	Henk van Gerven	888	
30	Remi Poppe	1,431	
Total		136,978	

=== vandeRegio ===
Candidate list for vandeRegio
Number	Candidate	Preference votes	Result
1	Sent Wierda	1,033	
2	Ton Raven	458	
3	Lex Ruyssenaars	114	
4	Boaz van Die	133	
5	Milica Marinkov	154	
6	Marien Weststrate	126	
7	Steven de Rooij	61	
8	Astrid de Deugd	139	
9	Hassan Razza	84	
10	John Sweenen	48	
11	Harry Staring	109	
12	Yvonne Edelman-Schaaf	71	
13	Gerda Brantenaar	45	
14	Yvonne de Nerée tot Babberich	157	
Total		2,732	

=== Volt Netherlands ===
Candidate list for Volt Netherlands
Number	Candidate	Preference votes	Result
1	Reinier van Lanschot	140,073	Elected
2	Anna Strolenberg	117,793	Elected
3	Teun Janssen	7,289	
4	Sacha Muller	11,715	
5	Ian Hendriks	789	
6	Anouk Ooms	12,766	
7	Caspar Brüsewitz	915	
8	Veerle Smit	8,172	
9	Mazdak Soltani	1,369	
10	Tetske Welling	2,124	
11	Cédric Deverchère	687	
12	Reyhan Çiğdem	2,357	
13	Roel Yska	867	
14	Roos Habets	1,885	
15	Jochem Sprenger	443	
16	Anna Veltkamp	1,598	
17	Marnix Vermeer	550	
18	Miranda Meijerman	1,140	
19	Geert Koops	543	
20	Verena Kitowski	570	
21	Ruben Schouten	740	
22	Monique Ansink	1,212	
23	Bram Kamp	3,886	
Total		319,483	

=== Belang Van Nederland (BVNL) ===
Candidate list for Belang van Nederland
Number	Candidate	Preference votes	Result
1	Wybren van Haga	19,502	
2	Roy van Aalst	550	
3	René Dercksen	203	
4	Stefanie Vulders	928	
5	Rob Elens	554	
6	Kim Tjoa	135	
7	Gerard van Erp	144	
8	Frederique Durlacher	184	
9	Bart Burggraaf	161	
10	Toine Manders	269	
11	Joyce van den Broek	214	
12	Arjan de Kok	188	
Total		23,032	

=== NSC ===
Candidate list for New Social Contract
Number	Candidate	Preference votes	Result
1	Dirk Gotink	136,176	Elected
2	Femke van der Meulen	47,831	
3	Reinout van Malenstein	13,654	
4	Naomi Yogi - van Loon	8,013	
5	Ronald de Bruin	8,383	
6	Susan Faal - Takak	5,225	
7	Jeroen van den Biggelaar	1,800	
8	Colette Kersten	3,765	
9	Vincent Verouden	399	
10	Jamilja van der Meulen	1,129	
11	Jurr van Dalen	2,789	
12	René Visser	1,035	
13	Quintijn Mauer	1,254	
14	Daniël Post	926	
15	Wil Steijling	413	
16	Marcel Roijen	772	
Total		233,564	

=== Pirate Party - The Greens ===
Candidate list for Pirate Party - The Greens
Number	Candidate	Preference votes	Result
1	Matthijs Pontier	9,426	
2	Saira Sadloe	4,852	
3	Mirjam van Rijn	2,042	
4	Jamal Ryane	1,115	
5	Mark van Treuren	318	
6	David van Deijk	455	
7	Désirée van Blitterswijk	898	
8	Wietze Brandsma	344	
9	André Linnenbank	138	
10	Otto ter Haar	201	
11	Eskild Wikkeling	110	
12	Paul Berendsen	47	
13	Teunis van Nes	132	
14	Kirsten Zimmerman	291	
15	Madé Linschooten	144	
16	Jean-Aimé Musangamfura	174	
17	Pejman Darvish-Zadeh	96	
18	Leontien Werner-Wafelman	148	
19	Rob Visser	151	
20	Sepehr Yadegari	100	
21	Tjerk Feitsma	63	
22	Edy Bouma	94	
23	Nabille El Hajoui	214	
24	Angeline Pot	219	
25	Branislav Plesa	34	
26	Dylan Hallegraeff	93	
27	Astrid Abendroth	69	
28	Dmitri Schrama	47	
29	Steven Russchenberg	29	
30	Peter Braun	160	
31	Arjan Bresser	142	
32	Paul Freriks	83	
33	Stefan Dekkers	75	
34	Peter Kemmink	53	
35	Vincent van der Velde	128	
36	Anne de Bruijn	99	
37	Tom Bakkers	29	
38	Jaap van Gelderen	48	
39	Auke van Breemen	84	
40	Goof Pontier	155	
41	Jaap baron van Till	156	
42	Metje Blaak	508	
Total		23,764	
