= European Parliament Committee on International Trade =

European Parliament committee

Committee on International Trade
- Abbreviation: INTA
- Type: Standing committee
- Legislature: European Parliament
- Parliamentary term: 10th European Parliament
- Chair: Bernd Lange; S&D, Germany
- Vice-Chairs: Manon Aubry (The Left); Iuliu Winkler (EPP); Karin Karlsbro (Renew); Kathleen Van Brempt (S&D)
- Members: 42
- Jurisdiction: Common commercial policy, trade and investment agreements, trade-defence instruments, export controls and relations with the World Trade Organization
- Counterpart: Foreign Affairs Council (Trade)
- Website: Official website

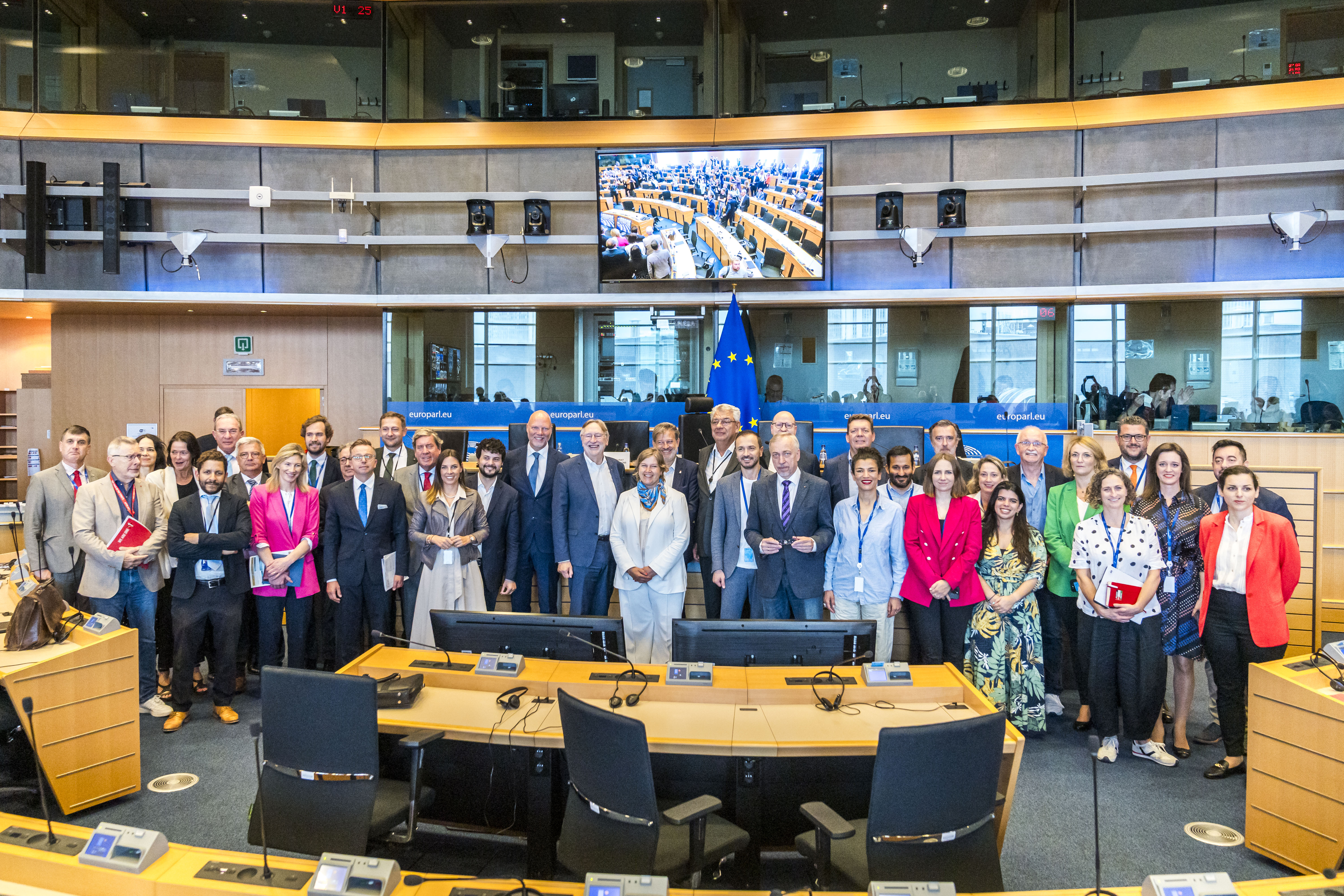
Constitutive meeting of the Committee on International Trade during the tenth parliamentary term

The Committee on International Trade (INTA) is a standing committee of the European Parliament. It is responsible for the establishment, implementation and monitoring of the European Union's Common Commercial Policy, including trade and investment legislation, bilateral and multilateral trade agreements, trade-defence instruments and relations with the World Trade Organization.

Following the entry into force of the Treaty of Lisbon, Parliament became co-legislator in the Common Commercial Policy and its consent became necessary for the conclusion of most international trade agreements. The Union's exclusive competence was also extended to include foreign direct investment.

== Responsibilities ==
The committee is responsible for matters relating to the Union's Common Commercial Policy and its external economic relations. It examines legislation governing trade in goods and services, commercial aspects of intellectual property, foreign direct investment and the Union's participation in the World Trade Organization.

Its remit includes:

- the Union's common commercial policy;
- trade in goods and services;
- commercial aspects of intellectual property;
- foreign direct investment;
- bilateral, regional, plurilateral and multilateral trade agreements;
- relations with the World Trade Organization and other organisations concerned with international trade;
- trade-defence instruments, including anti-dumping and anti-subsidy measures;
- export controls and trade restrictions;
- the Generalized System of Preferences;
- macro-financial assistance to non-EU countries;
- the trade aspects of sustainable development, labour standards, human rights and environmental policy; and
- parliamentary monitoring of the implementation and enforcement of trade agreements.

== Legislative role ==
INTA considers legislative proposals under the ordinary legislative procedure and prepares Parliament's position on international trade agreements. Parliament may approve or reject agreements but cannot amend their negotiated text. The committee therefore scrutinises negotiations before an agreement is signed and makes a recommendation on whether Parliament should grant consent.

The committee also monitors implementation after agreements enter into force. This includes examining commitments on market access, sustainable development, labour rights, environmental standards, dispute settlement and enforcement.

== Trade policy and agreements ==
The committee follows negotiations conducted by the European Commission with individual countries and regional organisations. It holds exchanges of views with the Commissioner responsible for trade, Commission negotiators, representatives of partner countries, businesses, trade unions and civil-society organisations.

Its work has included agreements and negotiations involving Canada, Japan, South Korea, Singapore, Vietnam, the Mercosur countries, Mexico, Chile, Australia, New Zealand and the United Kingdom. It also considers autonomous trade measures and market-access arrangements for developing countries.

== Trade enforcement and economic security ==
INTA examines instruments intended to protect the Union against unfair trade practices and economic coercion. These include anti-dumping and anti-subsidy measures, the International Procurement Instrument, the Foreign Subsidies Regulation and the Anti-Coercion Instrument.

The committee also deals with export-control legislation, foreign-investment screening and measures intended to strengthen economic security and the resilience of strategic supply chains.

== Chairs ==
The following table lists the chairs of the committee since 2009.

Name	Political group	Member state	Took office	Left office
Vital Moreira	S&D	Portugal	16 July 2009	30 June 2014
Bernd Lange	S&D	Germany	7 July 2014	Incumbent

== Members ==
=== 10th Parliament, 2024–2029 ===
The committee currently has 42 full members. Its current composition is shown below, with the chair and vice-chairs indicated in italics.

European People's Party	Progressive Alliance of Socialists and Democrats	European Conservatives and Reformists	Renew Europe
Iuliu Winkler, Romania, Vice-Chair; Céline Imart, France; Martine Kemp, Luxembourg; Ilia Lazarov, Bulgaria; Miriam Lexmann, Slovakia; Gabriel Mato, Spain; Angelika Niebler, Germany; Inese Vaidere, Latvia; Jörgen Warborn, Sweden; Bogdan Andrzej Zdrojewski, Poland; Juan Ignacio Zoido Álvarez, Spain	Bernd Lange, Germany, Chair; Kathleen Van Brempt, Belgium, Vice-Chair; Brando Benifei, Italy; Udo Bullmann, Germany; Andi Cristea, Romania; Jean-Marc Germain, France; Javier Moreno Sánchez, Spain; Ștefan Mușoiu, Romania	Rihards Kols, Latvia; Jaak Madison, Estonia; Daniele Polato, Italy; Dominik Tarczyński, Poland; Francesco Torselli, Italy	Karin Karlsbro, Sweden, Vice-Chair; Pascal Canfin, France; Benoît Cassart, Belgium; Bart Groothuis, Netherlands; Svenja Hahn, Germany
Patriots for Europe	Greens–European Free Alliance	The Left	Europe of Sovereign Nations
Christophe Bay, France; Anna Bryłka, Poland; Enikő Győri, Hungary; Sebastian Kruis, Netherlands; Thierry Mariani, France	Markéta Gregorová, Czechia; Majdouline Sbaï, France; Catarina Vieira, Netherlands	Manon Aubry, France, Vice-Chair; Lynn Boylan, Ireland; Rudi Kennes, Belgium	Markus Buchheit, Germany
Non-Inscrits			
Branislav Ondruš, Slovakia			

==== Substitute members ====
Substitute members of the 10th Parliament (click “show” to expand)

The committee's substitute members are listed below.

European People's Party	Progressive Alliance of Socialists and Democrats	European Conservatives and Reformists	Renew Europe
Mika Aaltola, Finland; Nina Carberry, Ireland; Borja Giménez Larraz, Spain; Dirk Gotink, Netherlands; Dariusz Joński, Poland; Sandra Kalniete, Latvia; David McAllister, Germany; Nicolás Pascual de la Parte, Spain; Lídia Pereira, Portugal; Ralf Seekatz, Germany; Željana Zovko, Croatia	Lucia Annunziata, Italy; Francisco Assis, Portugal; Stefano Bonaccini, Italy; Lina Gálvez, Spain; Raphaël Glucksmann, France; Hana Jalloul Muro, Spain; Cristina Maestre, Spain; Costas Mavrides, Cyprus	Nicolas Bay, France; Waldemar Buda, Poland; Emmanouil Fragkos, Greece; Kris Van Dijck, Belgium; Jessika van Leeuwen, Netherlands	Petras Auštrevičius, Lithuania; Dan Barna, Romania; João Cotrim de Figueiredo, Portugal; Barry Cowen, Ireland; Ľubica Karvašová, Slovakia
Patriots for Europe	Greens–European Free Alliance	The Left	Europe of Sovereign Nations
Elisabeth Dieringer, Austria; Aleksandar Nikolic, France; Pierre Pimpie, France; Hermann Tertsch, Spain; Isabella Tovaglieri, Italy	Saskia Bricmont, Belgium; Anna Cavazzini, Germany; Vicent Marzà Ibáñez, Spain	Danilo Della Valle, Italy; Marina Mesure, France; Martin Schirdewan, Germany	Tomasz Froelich, Germany
Non-Inscrits			
Fabio De Masi, Germany; Kateřina Konečná, Czechia			

== Research support ==
The committee is supported by the European Parliament's research services and the Policy Department for External Relations. These services provide studies, briefings and impact assessments on trade agreements, the World Trade Organization, investment policy, trade enforcement, economic security and the effects of trade policy on sustainable development.

Research prepared for the committee is published through Parliament's supporting-analyses database and the European Parliament Think Tank.

== See also ==
- Common Commercial Policy
- European Union free trade agreements
- World Trade Organization
- Directorate-General for Trade
- Generalized System of Preferences
- Trade defence instrument
- Foreign direct investment
- European Parliament Committee on Foreign Affairs
- European Parliament Committee on Development
