= Kim van Sparrentak =

Dutch politician (born 1989)

Kim van Sparrentak MEP
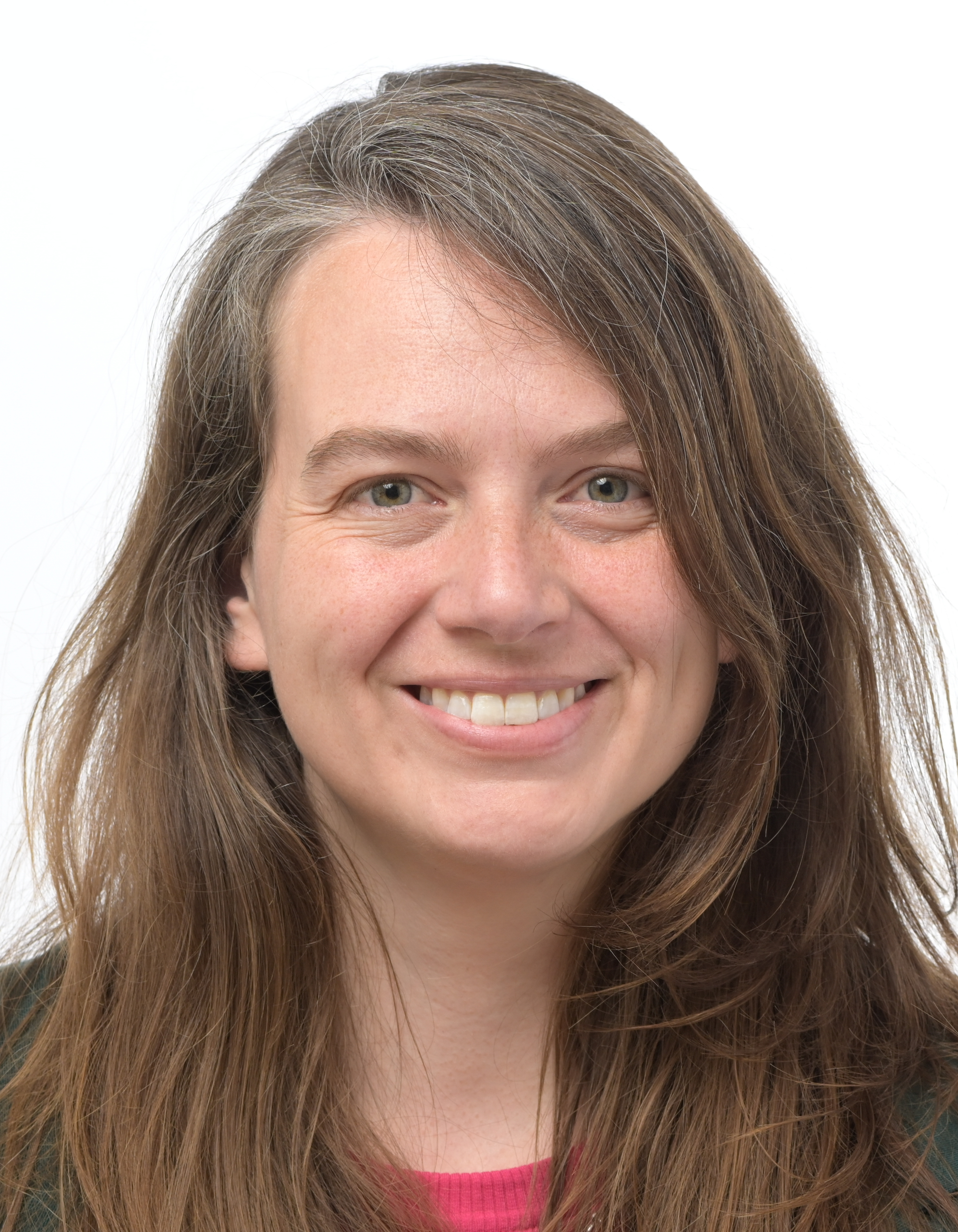

Member of the European Parliament for Netherlands
- Incumbent
- Assumed office 2 July 2019

Personal details
- Born: 16 October 1989 (age 36)
- Party: GroenLinks (2012–present)

Kimberly van Sparrentak (born 16 October 1989) is a Dutch politician who has been serving as a Member of the European Parliament for the GroenLinks political party since 2019.

She co-wrote legislation that limited the influence of major tech companies and that granted municipalities greater discretion in regulating which properties can be rented out for short-term homestays through platforms such as Airbnb.

Van Sparrentak was re-elected in June 2024 as the fourth candidate on the shared GroenLinks–PvdA list, which received a plurality in the Netherlands of eight seats. She is focused on digital affairs and LGBTQIA+ rights.

== Personal life ==
Van Sparrentak is a lesbian.

She was born in Vlissingen.

== Electoral history ==
Electoral history of Kim van Sparrentak
Year	Body	Party	Pos.	Votes	Result		Ref.
Year	Body	Party	Pos.	Votes	Party seats	Individual	Ref.
2019	European Parliament	GroenLinks	7	32,505	3	Won	
2024	European Parliament	GroenLinks–PvdA	4	128,336	8	Won	
