= Lara Wolters =

Dutch politician (born 1986)

Lara Wolters MEP
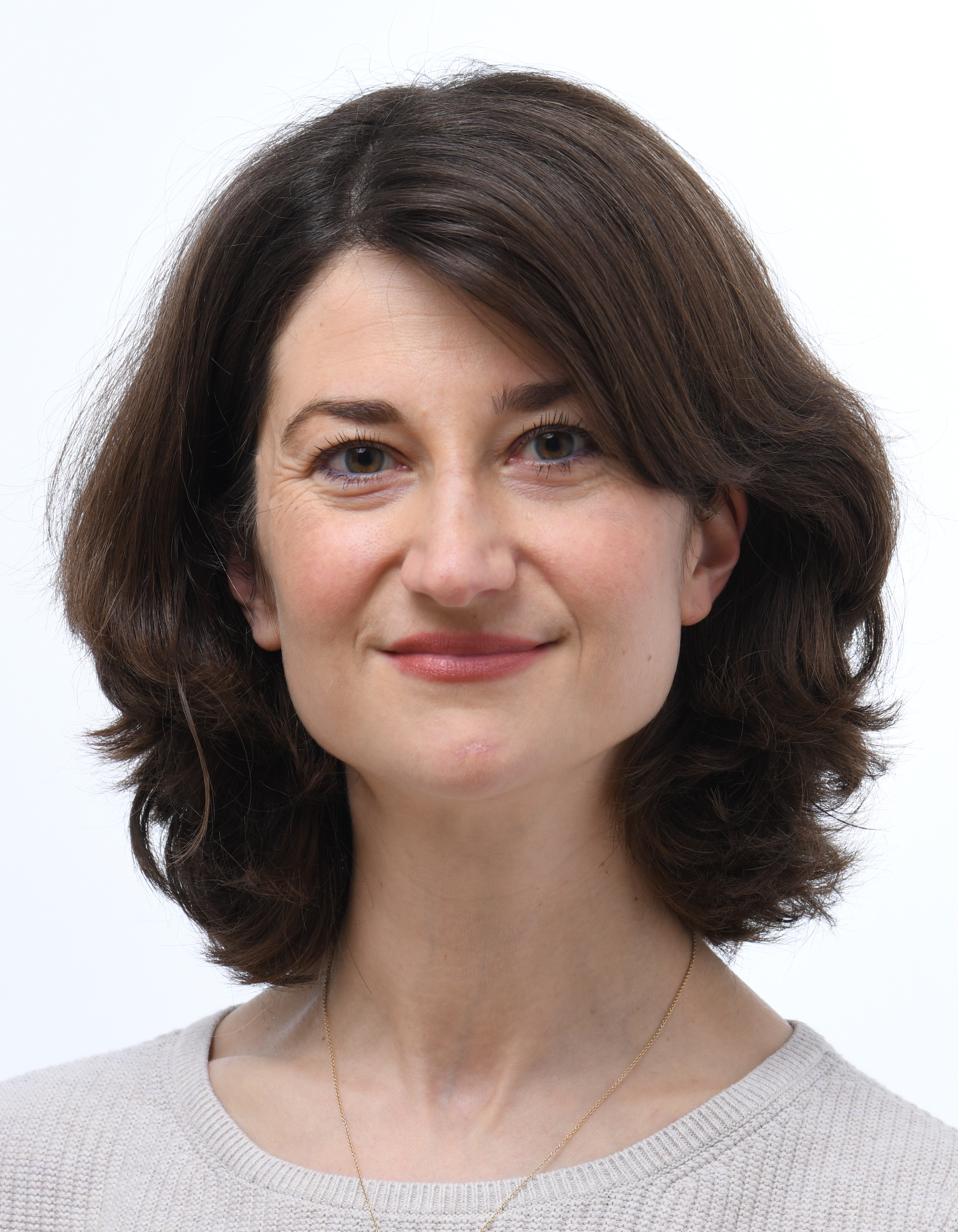

Member of the European Parliament
- Incumbent
- Assumed office 4 July 2019
- Preceded by: Frans Timmermans
- Constituency: Netherlands

Personal details
- Born: Lara Ianthe Wolters; 12 April 1986 (age 39) Amsterdam, Netherlands
- Party: Labour Party
- Children: 2

Lara Ianthe Wolters (born 12 April 1986) is a Dutch politician of the Labour Party (PvdA) who has served as a Member of the European Parliament (MEP) since 2019.

== Early life and education ==
After studying law and European social and political studies (ESPS) at the University College London she spent a year at the University of Strasbourg through the Erasmus Programme, where she completed an internship at the European Parliament. She also holds a degree in International Relations and Diplomacy from the College of Europe in Bruges.

== Political career ==
Wolters worked as a policy advisor in Brussels. She became a Member of the European Parliament when she replaced Frans Timmermans who decided not to take his parliamentary seat following the 2019 European elections to serve as Executive Vice President of the European Commission. She is a member of the Committee on Budgetary Control and Vice Chair of the Committee on Legal Affairs. In this capacity, she was rapporteur on the Corporate Sustainability Due Diligence Directive, having previously led a parliamentary resolution calling for legislation to make corporations accountable for issues such as worker exploitation, human rights violations, and environmental damage. She told that her interest in the topic had been sparked by the 2013 collapse of a Bangladeshi commercial building, which had resulted in over 1,100 deaths. The deal Wolters negotiated with the European Council after the directive had passed the parliament included corporate accountability regarding effort, despite her desire to have accountability regarding results.

She was also co-rapporteur on a 2022 directive on improving the gender balance on boards of directors of listed companies. In addition to her committee assignments, Wolters is part of the Parliament's delegation for relations with China. She is also a member of the European Parliament Intergroup on Anti-Corruption, the European Parliament Intergroup on Anti-Racism and Diversity, and the Responsible Business Conduct Working Group.

She was re-elected in June 2024 as the seventh candidate on the shared GroenLinks–PvdA list, which received a plurality in the Netherlands of eight seats. Her focus has since been on economic affairs, justice, and transportation.

== Personal life ==
Wolters' husband is Greek. They have two sons, born in 2021 and 2023. Since 2021 she has been leading a campaign for maternity leave for Members of the European Parliament.

== Electoral history ==
Electoral history of Lara Wolters
Year	Body	Party	Pos.	Votes	Result		Ref.
Year	Body	Party	Pos.	Votes	Party seats	Individual	Ref.
2024	European Parliament	GroenLinks–PvdA	7	39,881	8	Won	
