= European Parliament Committee on Legal Affairs =

European Parliament committee

Committee on Legal Affairs
- Abbreviation: JURI
- Type: Standing committee
- Legislature: European Parliament
- Parliamentary term: 10th European Parliament
- Chair: Ilhan Kyuchyuk; Renew, Bulgaria
- Vice-Chairs: Marion Walsmann (EPP); Mario Mantovani (ECR); Lara Wolters (S&D); Emil Radev (EPP)
- Members: 25
- Political composition: EPP: 7 · S&D: 5 · ECR: 3 · Renew: 3 · PfE: 3 · Greens/EFA: 2 · The Left: 1 · ESN: 1
- Jurisdiction: Interpretation and application of EU law, civil and commercial law, company law, intellectual property, better regulation, legal status and immunities
- Counterpart: Justice and Home Affairs Council
- Website: Official website

The Committee on Legal Affairs (JURI) is a standing committee of the European Parliament. It is responsible for the interpretation and application of European Union law, the compatibility of Union acts with the Treaties, civil and commercial law, company law, intellectual property, procedural law, better regulation and matters concerning the legal status and immunities of Members of the European Parliament.

== Responsibilities ==
The committee deals with the interpretation, application and monitoring of Union law and with the conformity of proposed and existing EU legislation with the Treaties. It also examines legal questions affecting the Union institutions and the legal order of the European Union.

Its remit includes:

- the interpretation, application and monitoring of European Union law;
- the conformity of Union acts with primary law and the principles of subsidiarity and proportionality;
- civil and commercial law, including cross-border judicial cooperation;
- company law, corporate governance and corporate reporting;
- intellectual-property law;
- procedural law and measures concerning access to justice;
- legal aspects of better regulation, delegated acts and implementing acts;
- codification and official consolidation of Union legislation;
- the Statute for Members of the European Parliament and the Staff Regulations of EU officials;
- parliamentary immunity and requests for the waiver or defence of immunity; and
- verification of the credentials of elected Members of the European Parliament.

== Conflicts of interest and Commission nominees ==
JURI examines the declarations of financial interests submitted by Commissioners-designate before their portfolio hearings. Its role is to determine whether a nominee's financial interests may create an actual or potential conflict of interest. Where concerns remain unresolved, the committee may conclude that the nominee cannot proceed to the substantive hearing stage.

In 2019, JURI concluded that Rovana Plumb and László Trócsányi could not proceed to their hearings because of unresolved conflicts-of-interest concerns.

== Monitoring the application of Union law ==
The committee follows the implementation and enforcement of Union legislation, including the European Commission's annual reports on monitoring the application of EU law. It also examines questions concerning the quality of legislation, legal certainty, subsidiarity and the use of delegated and implementing powers.

== Chairs ==
The following table lists the chairs of the committee since 2009.

Name	Political group	Member state	Took office	Left office
Klaus-Heiner Lehne	EPP	Germany	2009	2014
Pavel Svoboda	EPP	(Czech Republic) Czechia	2014	2019
Lucy Nethsingha	Renew Europe	United Kingdom	2019	2020
Adrián Vázquez Lázara	Renew Europe	Spain	2020	2024
Ilhan Kyuchyuk	Renew Europe	Bulgaria	2024	Incumbent

== Members ==
=== 10th Parliament, 2024–2029 ===
The committee currently has 25 full members. Its composition is shown below, with the chair and vice-chairs indicated in italics.

European People's Party	Progressive Alliance of Socialists and Democrats	European Conservatives and Reformists	Renew Europe
Marion Walsmann, Germany, Vice-Chair; Emil Radev, Bulgaria, Vice-Chair; Maravillas Abadía Jover, Spain; Lukas Mandl, Austria; Axel Voss, Germany; Adrián Vázquez Lázara, Spain; Michał Wawrykiewicz, Poland	Lara Wolters, Netherlands, Vice-Chair; José Cepeda, Spain; Victor Negrescu, Romania; René Repasi, Germany; Krzysztof Śmiszek, Poland	Mario Mantovani, Italy, Vice-Chair; Tobiasz Bocheński, Poland; Dominik Tarczyński, Poland	Ilhan Kyuchyuk, Bulgaria, Chair; Lukas Sieper, Germany; Dainius Žalimas, Lithuania
Patriots for Europe	Greens–European Free Alliance	The Left	Europe of Sovereign Nations
Ton Diepeveen, Netherlands; Juan Carlos Girauta Vidal, Spain; Pascale Piera, France	Sergey Lagodinsky, Germany; Tineke Strik, Netherlands	Mario Furore, Italy	Mary Khan, Germany

==== Substitute members ====
Substitute members of the 10th Parliament (click “show” to expand)

The committee's substitute members are listed below.

European People's Party	Progressive Alliance of Socialists and Democrats	European Conservatives and Reformists	Renew Europe
Magdalena Adamowicz, Poland; Daniel Buda, Romania; Caterina Chinnici, Italy; Henrik Dahl, Denmark; Angelika Niebler, Germany; Jörgen Warborn, Sweden; Javier Zarzalejos, Spain	Brando Benifei, Italy; Leire Pajín, Spain; Eric Sargiacomo, France; Tiemo Wölken, Germany; Alessandro Zan, Italy	Arkadiusz Mularczyk, Poland; Gheorghe Piperea, Romania; Kosma Złotowski, Poland	Pascal Canfin, France; Laurence Farreng, France; Jana Toom, Estonia
Patriots for Europe	Greens–European Free Alliance	The Left	Europe of Sovereign Nations
Jaroslav Knot, Czechia; Ernő Schaller-Baross, Hungary; Raffaele Stancanelli, Italy	David Cormand, France; Kira Marie Peter-Hansen, Denmark	Arash Saeidi, France	Marcin Sypniewski, Poland

== Research support ==
The committee is supported by the European Parliament's research services and policy departments. They provide studies, briefings and impact assessments on civil and commercial law, company law, intellectual property, legislative quality, legal affairs and the application of Union law.

== See also ==
- Directorate-General for Justice and Consumers
- Copyright law of the European Union
- European company law
- European Court of Justice
- European patent law
- Justice and Home Affairs Council
- Law of the European Union
- Parliamentary immunity
