= Ingeborg ter Laak =

Dutch politician (born 1973)

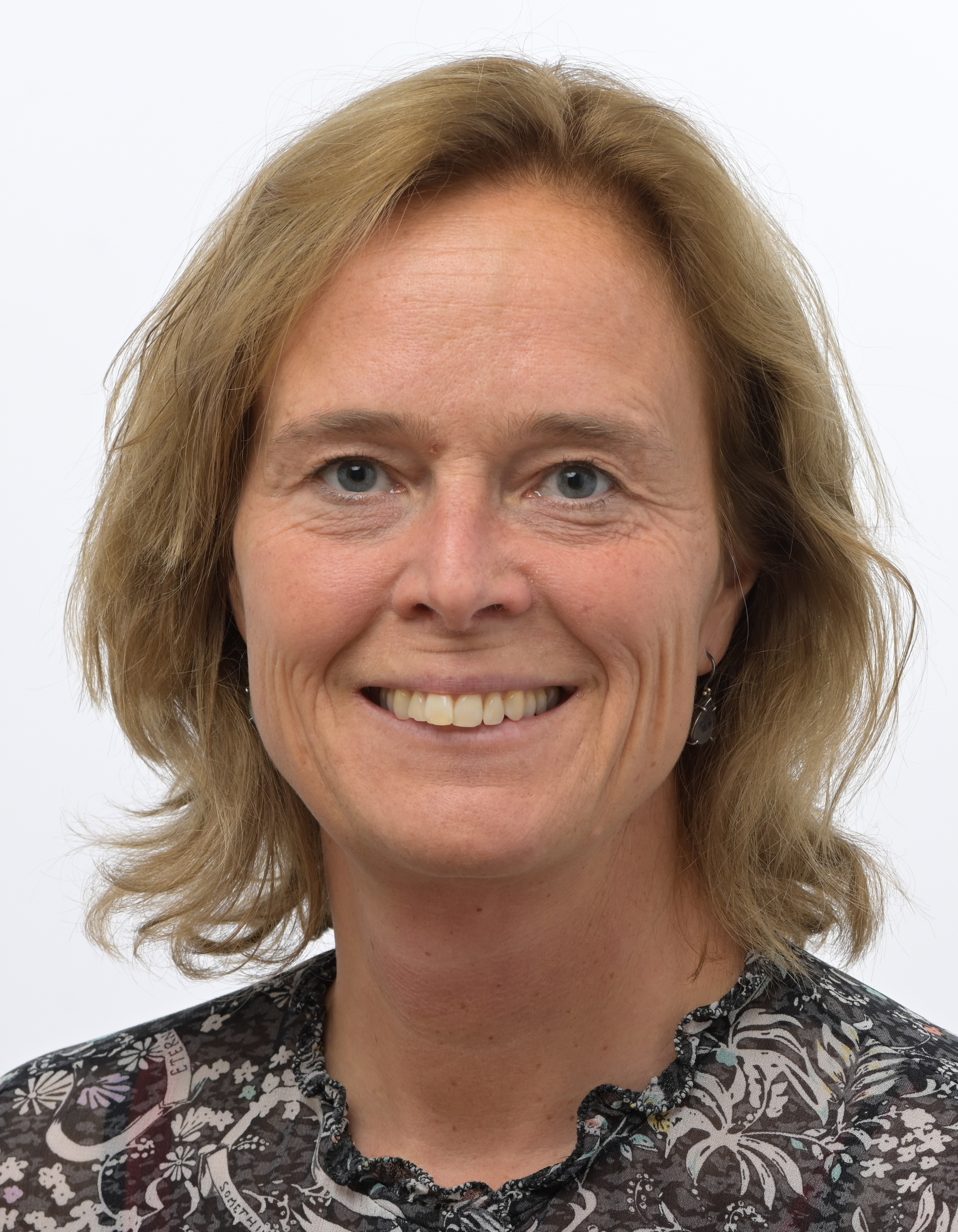
- Official portrait, 2024

Member of the European Parliament
- Incumbent
- Assumed office 16 July 2024
- Parliamentary group: European People's Party Group
- Constituency: Netherlands

Personal details
- Born: 18 February 1973 (age 53) Gouda, Netherlands
- Party: Christian Democratic Appeal; European People's Party

Ingeborg ter Laak (Dutch: [ˈɪŋəbɔr(ə)x tɛr ˈlaːk]; born 18 February 1973) is a Dutch politician of the Christian Democratic Appeal (CDA).

She ran for the European Parliament in June 2024 as the CDA's second candidate. The party secured three seats, and Ter Laak was elected.

== European Parliament committees ==
- Committee on the Environment, Public Health and Food Safety
- Delegation to the OACPS–EU Joint Parliamentary Assembly
- Delegation to the Africa–EU Parliamentary Assembly
- Committee on Foreign Affairs (substitute)
- Subcommittee on Public Health (substitute)
- Delegation for relations with the United States (substitute)

== Electoral history ==
Electoral history of Ingeborg ter Laak
Year	Body	Party	Pos.	Votes	Result		Ref.
Year	Body	Party	Pos.	Votes	Party seats	Individual	Ref.
2021	House of Representatives	Christian Democratic Appeal	48	323	15	Lost	
2024	European Parliament	Christian Democratic Appeal	2	63,860	3	Won	
