= Peter Kwint =

Dutch politician (born 1984)

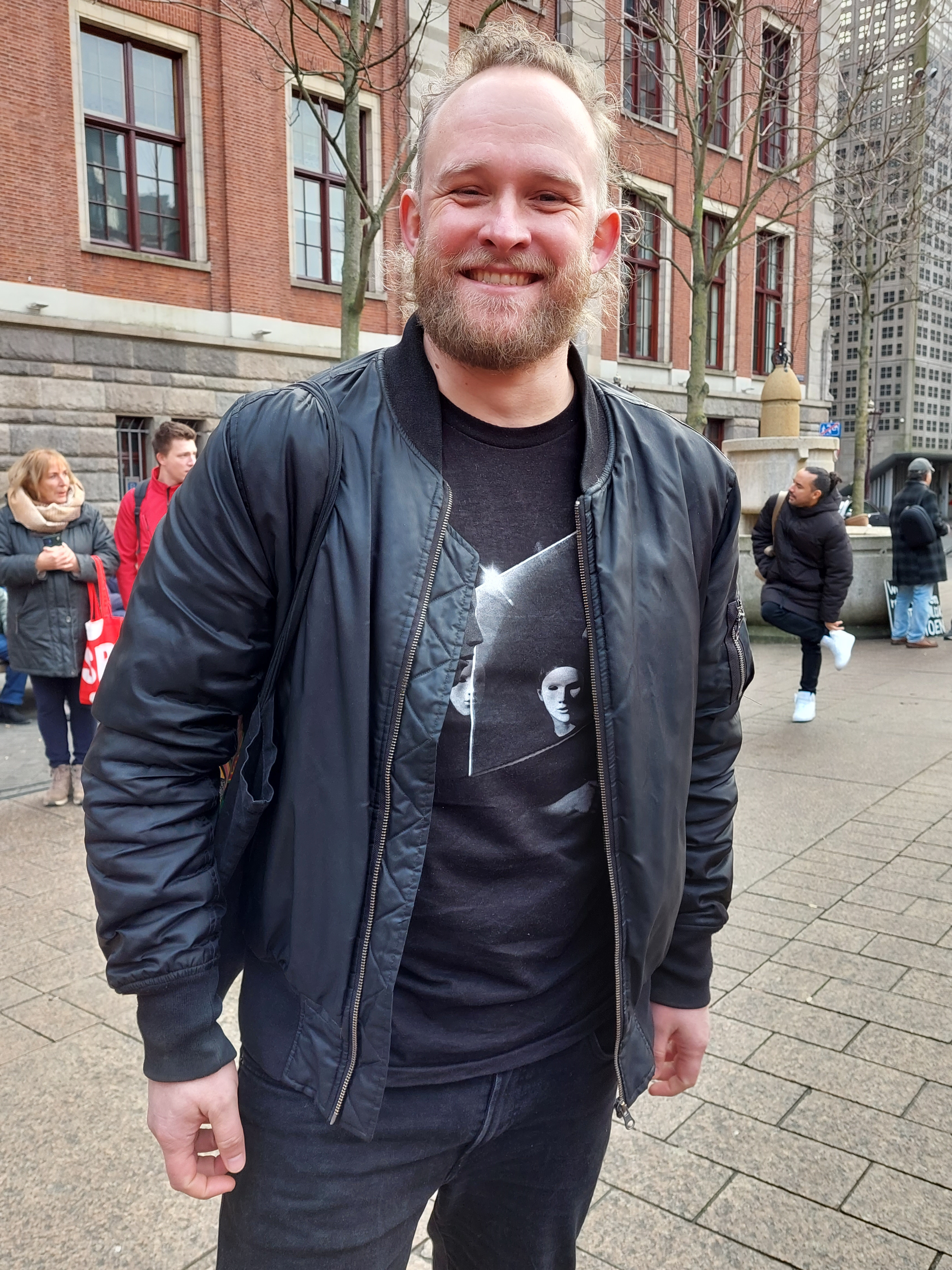
- Peter Kwint, February 2023

Member of the House of Representatives
- In office 23 March 2017 – 5 December 2023

Member of the municipal council of Amsterdam
- In office 27 March 2014 – 6 April 2017

Personal details
- Born: 19 December 1984 (age 41) Sliedrecht
- Party: Socialist Party
- Education: Leiden University, Vrije Universiteit Amsterdam
- Occupation: Politician

J.P. "Peter" Kwint (born 19 December 1984) is a Dutch politician, who served as a Member of Parliament for the Socialist Party between 2017 and 2023.

== Electoral history ==
Electoral history of Peter Kwint
Year	Body	Party	Pos.	Votes	Result		Ref.
Year	Body	Party	Pos.	Votes	Party seats	Individual	Ref.
2024	European Parliament	Socialist Party	24	1,131	0	Lost	
2026	Amsterdam Municipal Council	Socialist Party	30 (Note: Kwint participated as lijstduwer.)	129	1	Lost	
