= Catarina Vieira =

Dutch politician

Catarina Vieira MEP
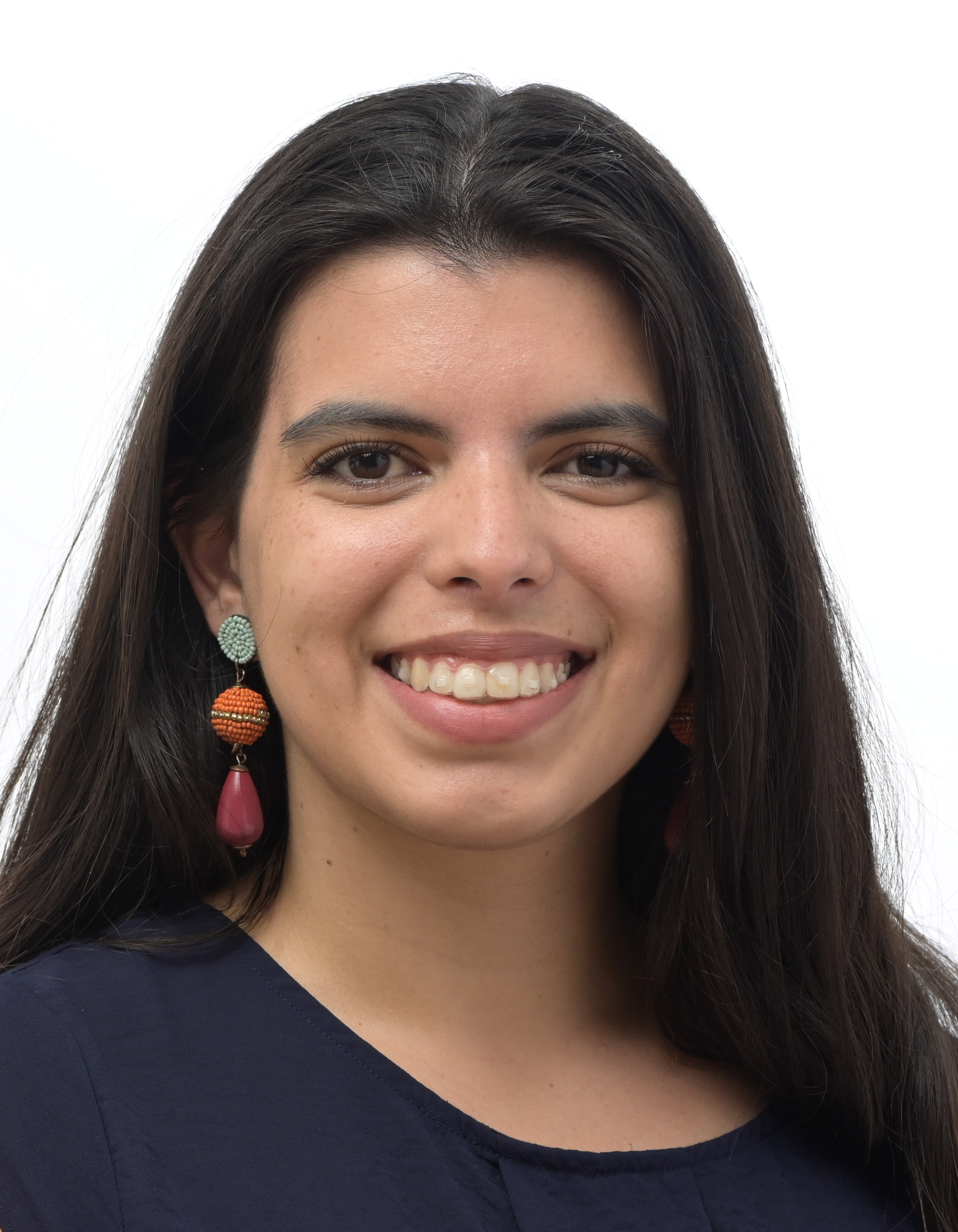
- Official portrait, 2024

Member of the European Parliament
- Incumbent
- Assumed office 16 July 2024
- Parliamentary group: Greens–European Free Alliance
- Constituency: Netherlands

Personal details
- Born: 14 May 1996 (age 29) Angra do Heroísmo, Azores, Portugal
- Party: GroenLinks; European Green Party

Catarina Cordeiro Vieira (born 14 May 1996) is a Portuguese-born Dutch politician of the progressive GroenLinks party.

She ran for the European Parliament in June 2024 as the tenth candidate on the shared GroenLinks–PvdA list. The party received a plurality in the Netherlands of eight seats, and Vieira was elected because of the nearly 32,000 preference votes cast for her. Her focus is on international trade and human rights. She is most well known for her speech in support of Stop Killing Games, where she references video game quotes.

== Personal life ==
Born in Azores islands, she lives in the Netherlands since 2017 and naturalised Dutch in 2025. She graduated with a bachelor in international relations at the University of Lisbon, spending an exchange year at Charles University in the Czech Republic.

== European Parliament committees ==
- Committee on International Trade
- Delegation to the Africa–EU Parliamentary Assembly
- Subcommittee on Human Rights (substitute)
- Delegation for relations with the countries of Central America (substitute)
  - EU–Central America Parliamentary Association Committee (substitute)
- Delegation to the Euro-Latin American Parliamentary Assembly (substitute)
- Delegation to the OACPS–EU Joint Parliamentary Assembly (substitute)

== Electoral history ==
Electoral history of Catarina Vieira
Year	Body	Party	Pos.	Votes	Result		Ref.
Year	Body	Party	Pos.	Votes	Party seats	Individual	Ref.
2024	European Parliament	GroenLinks–PvdA	10	31,929	8	Won (Note: Vieira received enough preference votes to be elected despite her party's result.)	
