= Brigitte van den Berg =

Dutch politician (born 1989)

Brigitte van den Berg MEP
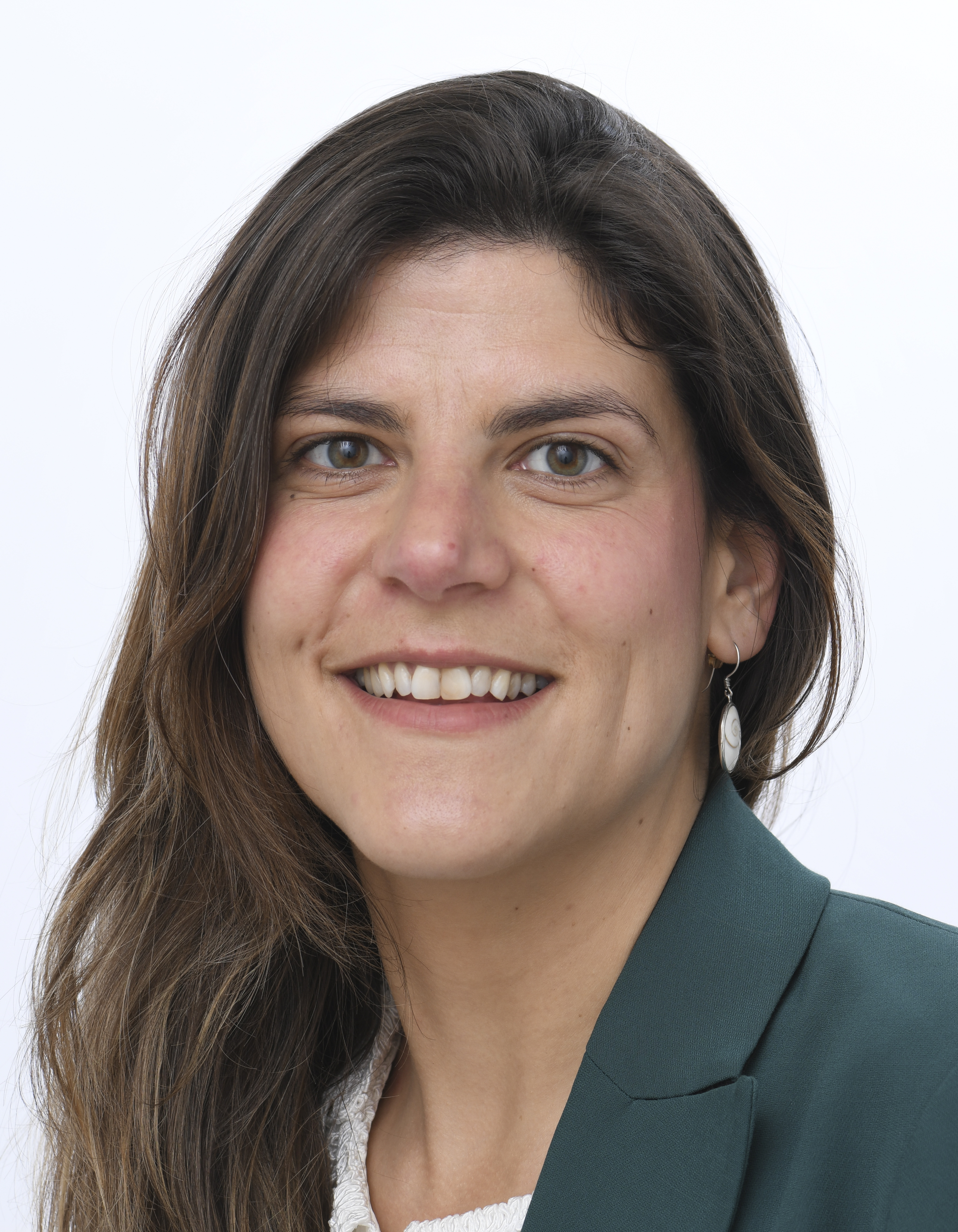
- Official portrait, 2024

Member of the European Parliament
- Incumbent
- Assumed office 16 July 2024
- Parliamentary group: Renew Europe
- Constituency: Netherlands

Personal details
- Born: 22 March 1989 (age 37)
- Party: Democrats 66
- Other political affiliations: Alliance of Liberals and Democrats for Europe Party

Brigitte van den Berg (born 22 March 1989) is a Dutch politician of Democrats 66 who has served as Member of the European Parliament since 2024.

== Early life and career ==
She was born in Heemskerk . Van den Berg was a member of the Model European Parliament, and attended its international conferences in 2006 and 2007. At the age of 19, she watched a municipal council meeting to prepare for a political farce at the Young Art Festival, and became interested in its debates. She joined Democrats 66 because of its pro-European stance, and became leader of its Beverwijk parliamentary group in 2010. Following the 2018 municipal elections, she became an alderwoman in the municipal executive of Beverwijk.

Van den Berg was D66's third candidate in the June 2024 European Parliament election, when the part secured three seats. She was elected, and her term started on 16 July 2024.

=== European Parliament committees ===
- Committee on Employment and Social Affairs
- Delegation to the EU–Armenia Parliamentary Partnership Committee
- Delegation to the EU–Azerbaijan Parliamentary Cooperation Committee
- Delegation to the EU–Georgia Parliamentary Association Committee
- Delegation to the Euronest Parliamentary Assembly
- Committee on Industry, Research and Energy (substitute)
- Committee on Culture and Education (substitute)

== Electoral history ==
Electoral history of Brigitte van den Berg
Year	Body	Party	Pos.	Votes	Result		Ref.
Year	Body	Party	Pos.	Votes	Party seats	Individual	Ref.
2024	European Parliament	Democrats 66	3	46,436	3	Won	
2026	Beverwijk Municipal Council	Democrats 66	20 (Note: Van den Berg participated as lijstduwer.)	37	3	Lost	
