= Anouk van Brug =

Dutch politician (born 1992)

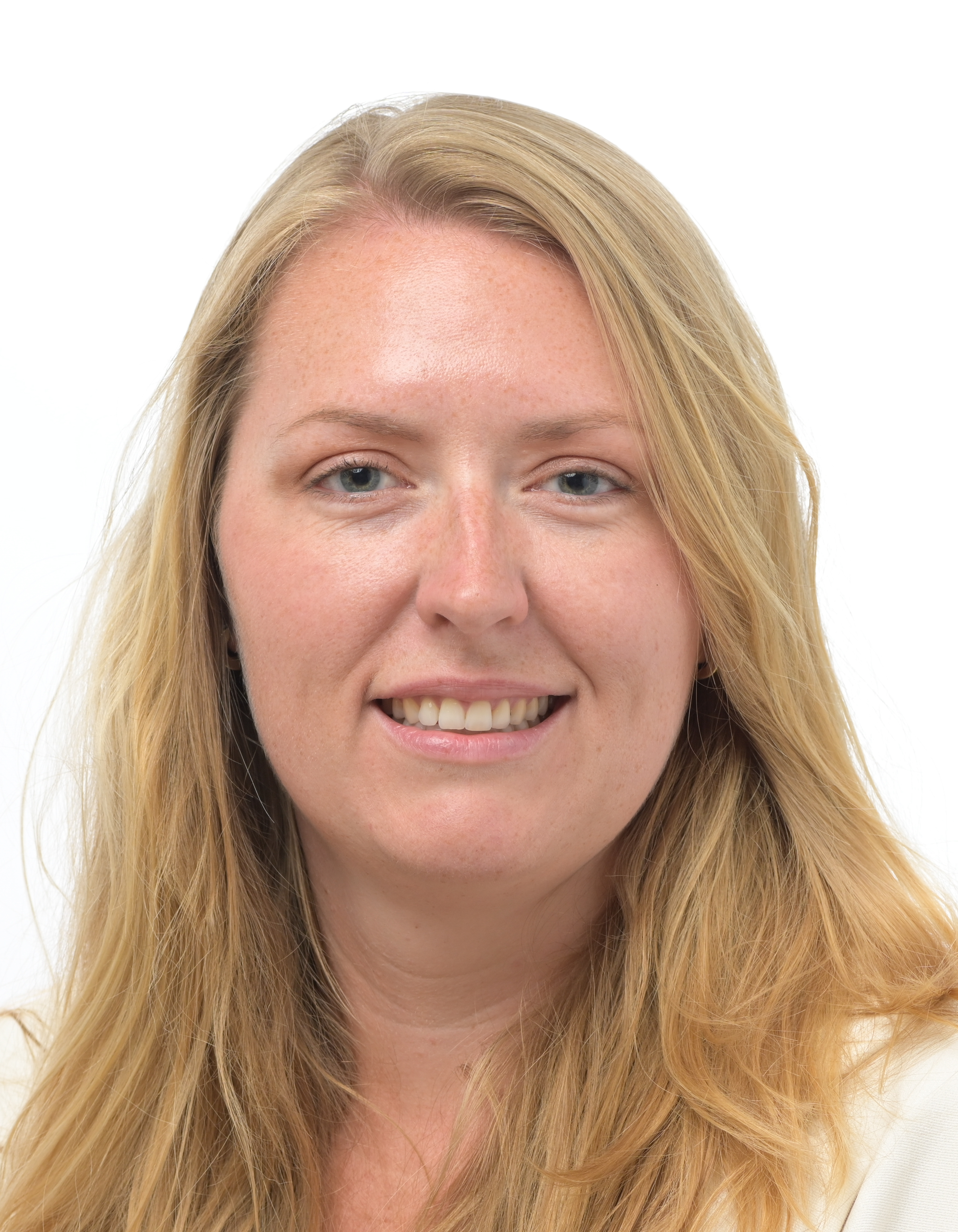
- Official portrait, 2024

Member of the European Parliament
- Incumbent
- Assumed office 16 July 2024
- Parliamentary group: Renew Europe
- Constituency: Netherlands

Personal details
- Born: 14 September 1992 (age 33) Amsterdam, Netherlands
- Party: People's Party for Freedom and Democracy; Alliance of Liberals and Democrats for Europe Party
- Occupation: Politician

Anouk van Brug (Dutch: [aːˈnuk fɑm ˈbrʏx]; born 14 September 1992) is a Dutch politician of the conservative-liberal People's Party for Freedom and Democracy (VVD).

She ran for the European Parliament in June 2024 as the VVD's ninth candidate. The party secured four seats, and Van Brug was elected because of the over 31,000 preference votes cast on her. Her focus has been on finances, economy, and online safety.

== Role in the European Parliament ==
=== Committee memberships ===
When taking office, Van Brug got appointed in the following committees and delegations:

- Committee on Economic and Monetary Affairs
- Delegation to the EU–Mexico Joint Parliamentary Committee
- Delegation for relations with the countries of Central America
- EU–Central America Parliamentary Association Committee
- Committee on Budgets (substitute)
- Delegation for relations with the United States (substitute)
- Delegation for relations with Japan (substitute)

=== Parliamentary work ===
In September 2024, Van Brug was appointed as rapporteur on the parliament's annual report on the European Central Bank.

== Electoral history ==
Electoral history of Anouk van Brug
Year	Body	Party	Pos.	Votes	Result		Ref.
Year	Body	Party	Pos.	Votes	Party seats	Individual	Ref.
2024	European Parliament	VVD	9	31,569	4	Won (Note: Van Brug received enough preference votes to be elected despite her party's result.)	
2026	The Hague Municipal Council	VVD	45 (Note: Van Brug participated as a lijstduwer.)	18	3	Lost	
