= Robert Housmans =

Dutch politician

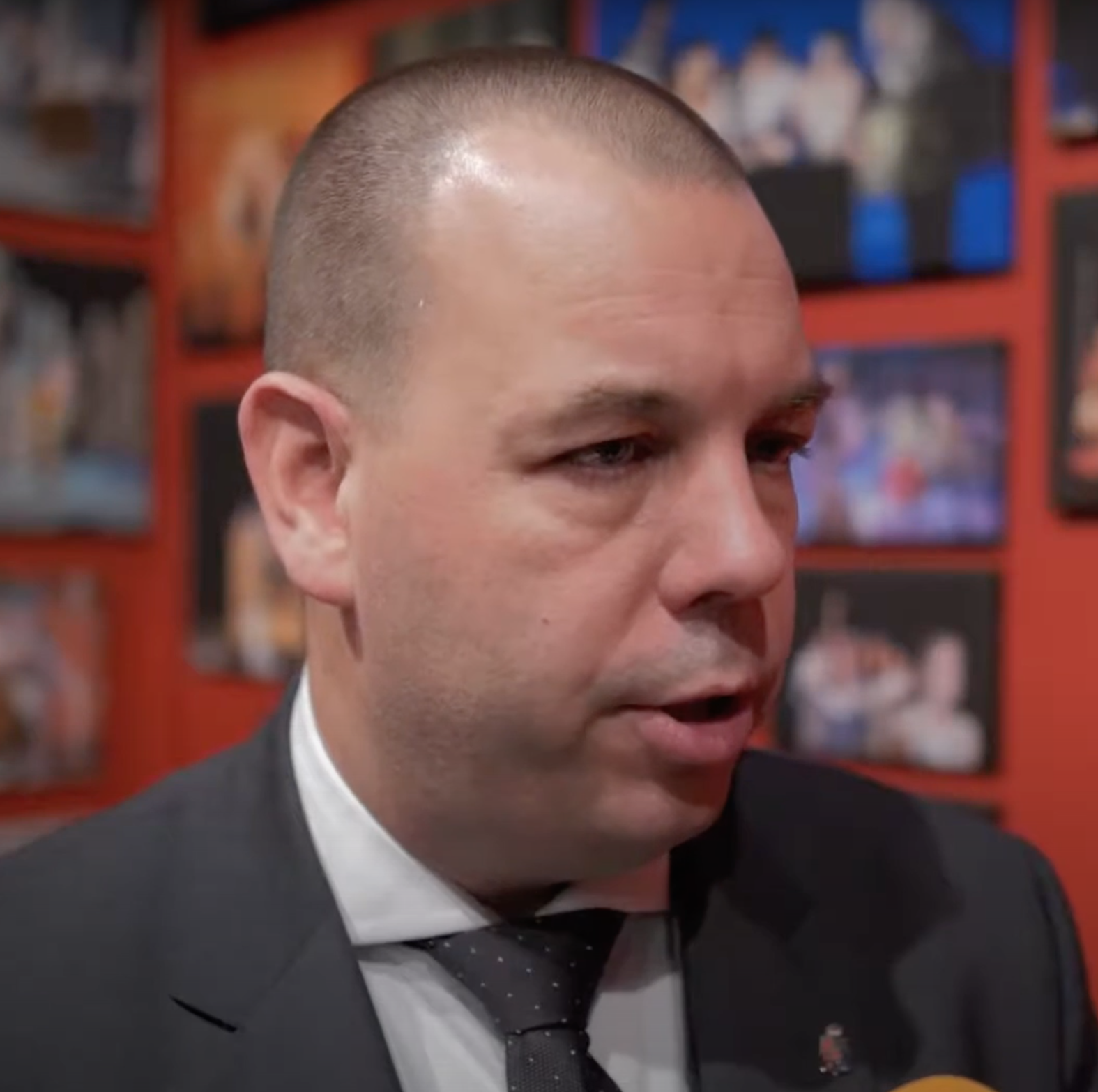

Member of the States-Provincial of Limburg
- Incumbent
- Assumed office March 2015

Personal details
- Born: 1974 (age 51–52) Sittard-Geleen, Netherlands
- Party: Party for Freedom (2015–present); Proud of the Netherlands (before 2015)

Robert Housmans (born 1974) is a Dutch politician and a member of the States-Provincial of Limburg for the Party for Freedom since 2015.

Housmans was a councilor and party leader on behalf of local parties in Sittard-Geleen, successively for Proud of the Netherlands, then for the localist Focus and Stadspartij. In March 2015, he was elected to the States-Provincial of Limburg for the Party for Freedom. Housmans is a deputy for the period 2019–2023 with security, care and the militia in his portfolio on the Provincial Council.

== Electoral history ==
Electoral history of Robert Housmans
Year	Body	Party	Pos.	Votes	Result		Ref.
Year	Body	Party	Pos.	Votes	Party seats	Individual	Ref.
2021	House of Representatives	Party for Freedom	49	279	17	Lost	
2024	European Parliament	Party for Freedom	17	5,825	6	Lost	
