= Jessika van Leeuwen =

Dutch politician (born 1981)

Jessika van Leeuwen MEP
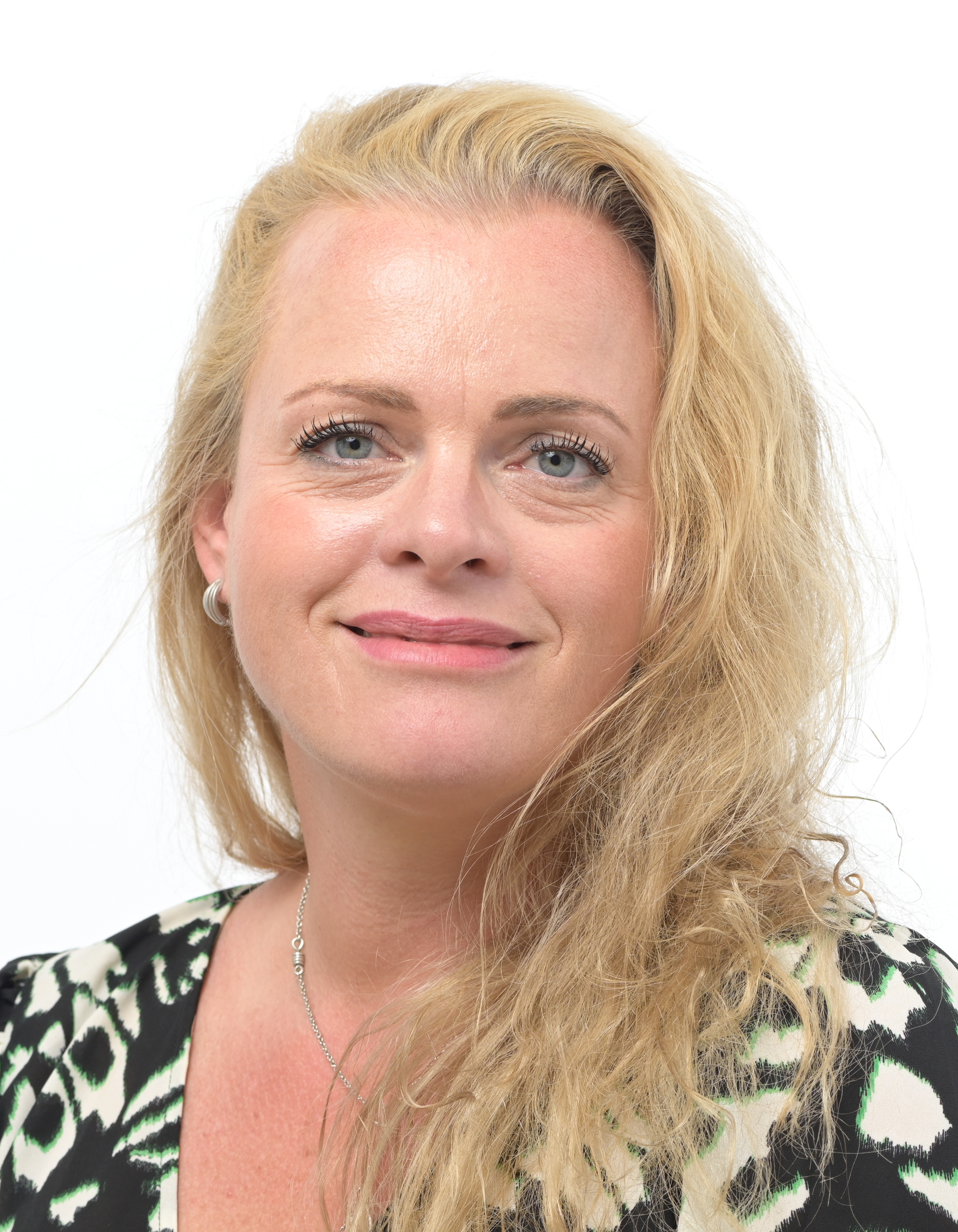
- Official portrait, 2024

Member of the European Parliament
- Incumbent
- Assumed office 16 July 2024
- Parliamentary group: European People's Party Group
- Constituency: Netherlands

Personal details
- Born: 10 September 1981 (age 44)
- Party: Farmer–Citizen Movement

Jessika van Leeuwen (Dutch: [ˈjɛsikaː vɑn ˈleːu̯.ə(n)]; born 10 September 1981) is a Dutch politician of the Farmer–Citizen Movement who was elected member of the European Parliament in June 2024. Her party secured two seats, and Van Leeuwen was the BBB's second candidate. She was previously group leader of her party on the Drents Overijsselse Delta water board.

== European Parliament committees ==
- Committee on Agriculture and Rural Development
- Delegation for relations with the Pan-African Parliament
- Committee on International Trade (substitute)
- Committee on Regional Development (substitute)
- Delegation for relations with the countries of the Andean Community (substitute)

== Electoral history ==
Electoral history of Jessika van Leeuwen
Year	Body	Party	Pos.	Votes	Result		Ref.
Year	Body	Party	Pos.	Votes	Party seats	Individual	Ref.
2024	European Parliament	Farmer–Citizen Movement	2	43,868	2	Won	
