= Mohammed Chahim =

Dutch politician (born 1985)

Mohammed Chahim MEP
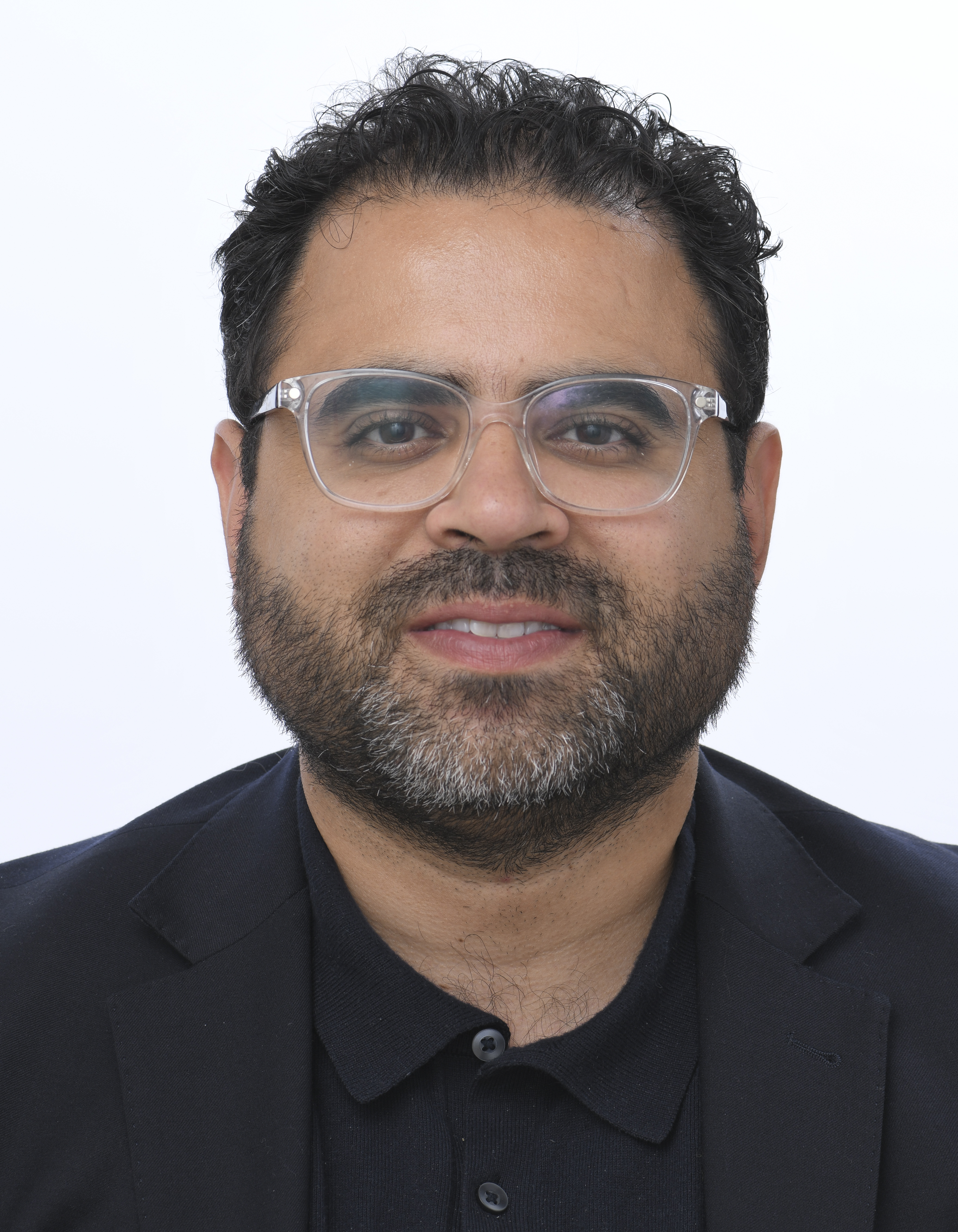

Member of the European Parliament
- Incumbent
- Assumed office 2 July 2019
- Constituency: Netherlands

Personal details
- Born: 18 April 1985 (age 41) Fez, Morocco
- Party: Labour Party
- Education: Tilburg University

Mohammed Chahim (born 18 April 1985) is a Moroccan-born Dutch politician of the Labour Party (PvdA) who has served as a Member of the European Parliament (MEP) since 2019.

He is the EUs Socialists & Democrats vice president and rapporteur for the carbon border adjustment mechanism.

"Politico" rated him with an influence of 17/30 in October 2023.

== Education and career ==
Chahim was born in Fez, Morocco, and he grew up in the Dutch cities of Weert and Helmond. He graduated with a PhD in econometrics from Tilburg University in 2013, and he subsequently researched sustainability and the circular economy at the Netherlands Organisation for Applied Scientific Research (TNO) in Delft.

== Political career ==
Chahim was elected to the municipal council of Helmond in 2006 for the Labour Party. He was reelected in 2010, 2014 and 2018. In 2014, he became party group leader in the council, a position he held until 2019, when he resigned his seat following his election to the European Parliament.

Chahim has served as a Member of the European Parliament since 2019. In the European Parliament, he has served on the Committee on the Environment, Public Health and Food Safety, where he is the rapporteur for the Carbon Border Adjustment Mechanism. In 2020, he also joined the Committee of Inquiry on the Protection of Animals during Transport.

In addition to his committee assignments, Chahim is part of the European Parliament's delegation for relations with India. He is also part of the European Parliament Intergroup on Climate Change, Biodiversity and Sustainable Development.

In 2021, Chahim was part of the European Parliament's official delegation to the United Nations Climate Change Conference (COP26).

Chahim is the head of EP's work on the carbon border tax, an element of the Fit for 55 climate package. He is enforcing the Green Deal in the Socialists & Democrats parliament bloc, when he made the bloc rejecting conservatives industry friendly legislation in carbon market regulation in summer 2023. This step forced the Parliament to accept steeper emission targets than intended by the commission.

In March 2024, Chahim was one of twenty MEPs to be given a "Rising Star" award at The Parliament Magazine's annual MEP Awards. He was re-elected in June 2024 as the second candidate on the shared GroenLinks–PvdA list, which won a plurality in the Netherlands of eight seats. His focus has since been on climate, industry, and energy.

== Electoral history ==
Electoral history of Mohammed Chahim
Year	Body	Party	Pos.	Votes	Result		Ref.
Year	Body	Party	Pos.	Votes	Party seats	Individual	Ref.
2024	European Parliament	GroenLinks–PvdA	2	65,274	8	Won	
