= Jeannette Baljeu =

Dutch politician (born 1967)

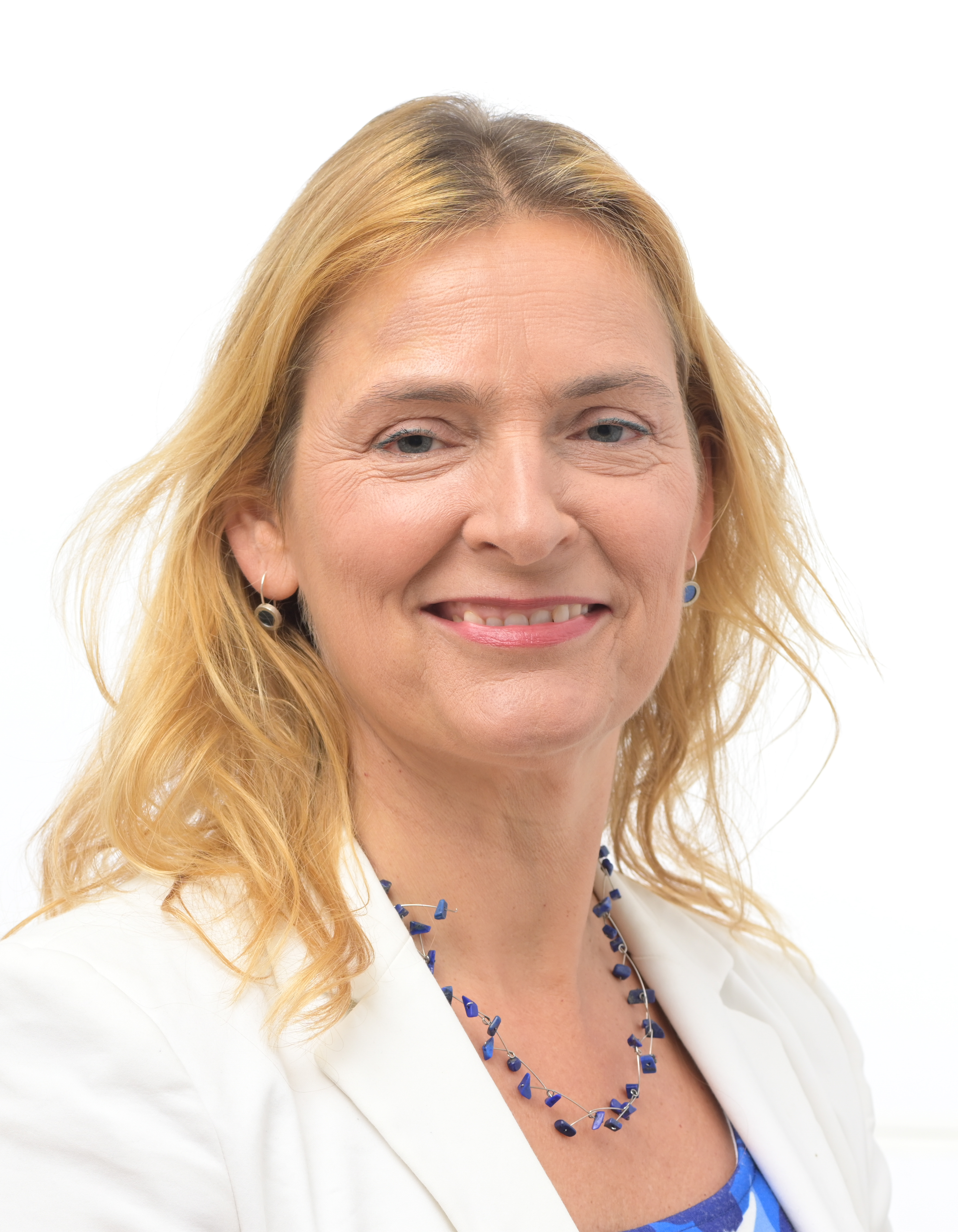
- Official portrait, 2024

Member of the European Parliament
- Incumbent
- Assumed office 16 July 2024
- Parliamentary group: Renew Europe
- Constituency: Netherlands

Member of the Provincial Council of South Holland
- In office 15 March 2023 – 15 July 2024

Personal details
- Born: Jeannette Nicole Baljeu; 7 August 1967 (age 58) Den Helder, Netherlands
- Party: People's Party for Freedom and Democracy; Alliance of Liberals and Democrats for Europe Party
- Occupation: Politician

Jeannette Nicole Baljeu (Dutch: [ʑɑˈnɛd bɑlˈjøː]; born 7 August 1967) is a Dutch politician of the conservative-liberal People's Party for Freedom and Democracy (VVD).

She ran for the European Parliament in June 2024 as the VVD's third candidate. The party secured four seats, and Baljeu was elected. Her focus is on internal market, entrepreneurs, and transportation and industry sustainability.

== European Parliament committees ==
- Committee on the Internal Market and Consumer Protection
- Delegation for relations with the People's Republic of China
- Committee on the Environment, Public Health and Food Safety (substitute)
- Delegation to the EU–UK Parliamentary Partnership Assembly (substitute)

== Electoral history ==
Electoral history of Jeannette Baljeu
Year	Body	Party	Pos.	Votes	Result		Ref.
Year	Body	Party	Pos.	Votes	Party seats	Individual	Ref.
2024	European Parliament	VVD	3	91,653	4	Won	
