= Sebastiaan Stöteler =

Dutch politician (born 1983)

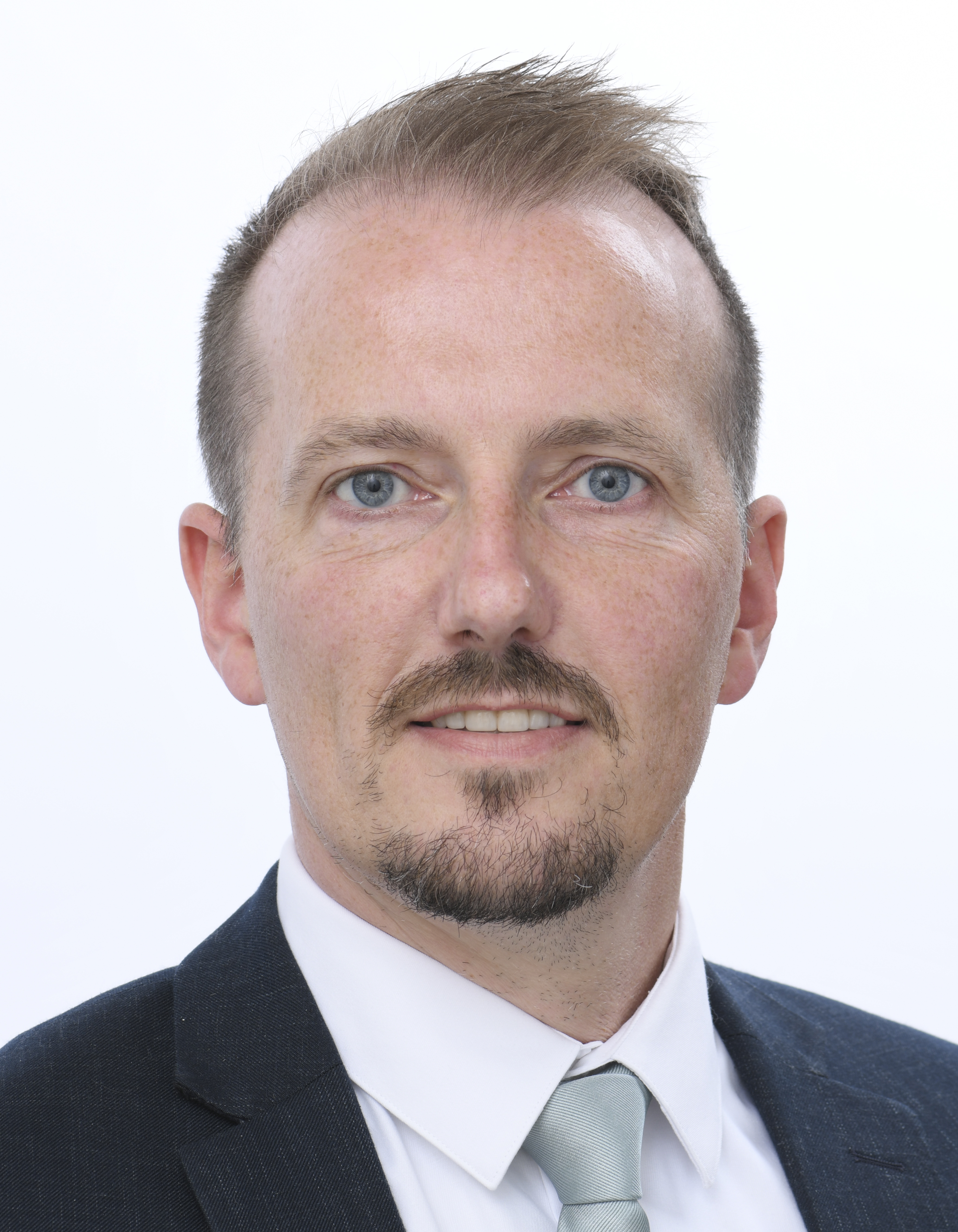
- Official portrait, 2024

Member of the House of Representatives
- Incumbent
- Assumed office 12 November 2025

Member of the European Parliament
- In office 16 July 2024 – 11 November 2025
- Succeeded by: Mieke Andriese
- Parliamentary group: Patriots for Europe
- Constituency: Netherlands

Member of the Provincial Council of Overijssel
- In office 16 March 2022 – 15 July 2024

Member of the Almelo Municipal Council
- In office 21 March 2018 – 15 July 2024

Personal details
- Born: T.S.M. Stöteler; 18 November 1983 (age 42) Almelo, Netherlands
- Party: PVV (since 2016)
- Education: HU University of Applied Sciences Utrecht
- Occupation: Politician; judicial officer

T.S.M. "Sebastiaan" Stöteler (Dutch: [səˈbɑstijaːn ˈstøːtələr]; born 18 November 1983) is a Dutch politician of the right-wing populist Party for Freedom (PVV).

Born and raised in Almelo, he worked as a judicial officer and served on its municipal council starting in 2018. He became a member of the Provincial Council of Overijssel in 2022. Stöteler was elected to the European Parliament in June 2024 as the PVV's lead candidate.

== Biography ==
=== Early life ===
Stöteler was born in Almelo, Overijssel in 1983 and he grew up there. He had several jobs after graduating high school with a havo diploma before studying law at the HU University of Applied Sciences Utrecht. From 2002 to 2008 he was a bailiff and later a judicial officer for a debt collection agency starting in the mid-2010s.

=== Political career ===
Stöteler first became involved with the PVV in 2016 and volunteered as a policy officer for the PVV's faction in the Provincial Council of Overijssel. Stöteler entered the Almelo Municipal Council in 2018, where he has served on its presidium and as the PVV's parliamentary leader. Comparing him to other municipal councilors of the PVV, de Volkskrant described Stöteler as a moderate who occasionally cooperated with the governing coalition. He was the party's 25th candidate in the March 2021 general election, when the PVV won 17 seats. Stöteler became a member of the Provincial Council of Overijssel the following year next to this job and his position on the municipal council.

He was selected as the PVV's lead candidate in the June 2024 European Parliament election. Newspaper NRC called Stöteler invisible during the campaign, as he shied away from public appearances apart from attending two debates. He announced that the PVV intended to leave the Identity and Democracy Party in favor of a new party to be established by French politician Marine Le Pen. The PVV became the second-largest party in the Netherlands, winning six seats, and Stöteler was elected. Its MEPs joined the new Patriots for Europe political group that included Le Pen's National Rally and the Hungarian Fidesz party. Stöteler became vice-chair of the group, and he has served on the following committees:

- Committee on the Environment, Public Health and Food Safety
- Committee on Foreign Affairs
- Subcommittee on Security and Defence
- Delegation for relations with Israel
- Delegation for relations with the countries of Southeast Asia and ASEAN (substitute)

== Political positions ==
Stöteler has stated that his main political interests and strengths are in estimating how law works in practice. He has argued that Islam is not a religion but a totalitarian ideology which he likened to fascism and has spoken out against the construction of new mosques in the Netherlands. In 2021, Stöteler argued that the PVV does not want to exclude foreigners or immigrants from the Netherlands but is against what he described as "Islamization" of the country. Stöteler also supports expanding nuclear energy in the Netherlands. A 2020 profile in Dutch newspaper Tubantia described Stöteler as a relatively pragmatic and moderate member of the PVV.

== Electoral history ==
Electoral history of Sebastiaan Stöteler
| Year | Body | Party | Pos. | Votes | Result | | Ref. |
| Year | Body | Party | Pos. | Votes | Party seats | Individual | Ref. |
|---|---|---|---|---|---|---|---|
| 2019 | Senate | PVV | 11 | 0 | 5 | Lost | |
| 2021 | House of Representatives | PVV | 25 | 338 | 17 | Lost | |
| 2024 | European Parliament | PVV | 1 | 546,868 | 6 | Won | |
| 2025 | House of Representatives | PVV | 2 | 8,584 | 26 | Won | |
