= Sebastian Kruis =

Dutch politician

Sebastian Kruis MEP
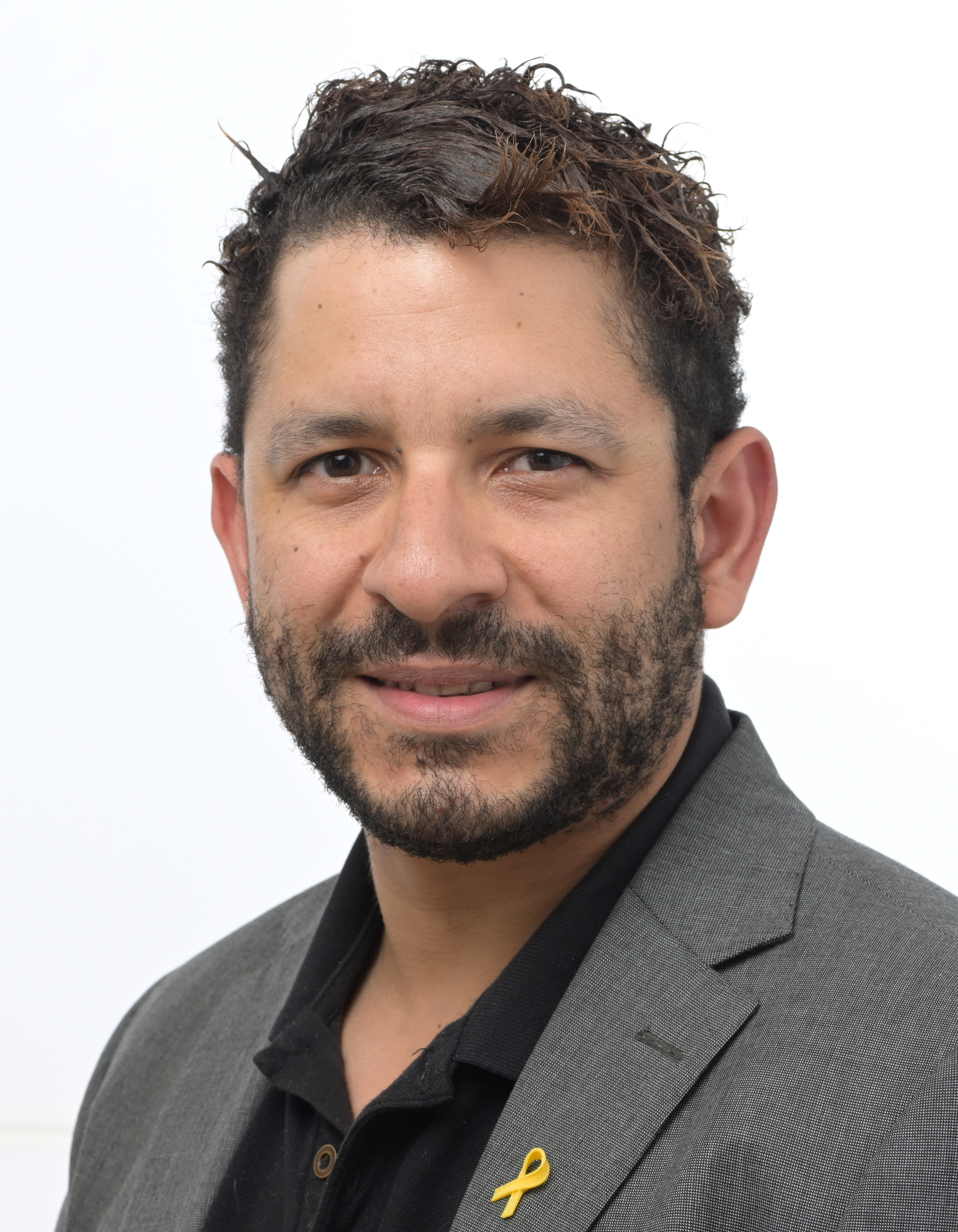
- Official portrait, 2024

Member of the European Parliament
- Incumbent
- Assumed office 16 July 2024
- Parliamentary group: Patriots for Europe
- Constituency: Netherlands

Member of The Hague Municipal Council
- In office 11 October 2018 – 20 June 2024
- Preceded by: Willie Dille

Member of the States of South Holland
- In office 17 September 2014 – 31 March 2015
- Preceded by: Vicky Maeijer

Personal details
- Born: 4 August 1989 (age 36) Medellín, Colombia
- Party: PVV (since 2006)

Alvaro Sebastian Kruis (born 4 August 1989) is a Colombian-born Dutch politician of the Party for Freedom (PVV). He was elected member of the European Parliament in 2024. He served as a member of the municipal council of The Hague for almost 6 years until his election as MEP.

== Early life and career ==
Kruis was born in 1989 in Medellín, Colombia, and was left in a foster home by his addicted biological mother. He was adopted by a couple in Zoetermeer in the Netherlands at the age of nine months. In a 2022 interview, Kruis explained that he was initially unable to locate his biological family due to misconducts within the international adoption system before learning that his parents were both drug addicts and homeless at the time of his birth. He subsequently located his mother in Colombia and said the experience was a factor that motivated his interest in politics and social issues. After leaving secondary school, Kruis was a social worker and later a property manager.

He joined the PVV at the age of 17 in 2006 as a volunteer for the party on the day he was criticized by his school for a presentation he gave about immigration. He began working for the national PVV in 2011 as a press officer, and succeeded Vicky Maeijer as member of the Provincial Council of South Holland in 2014. Kruis ran for the European Parliament in the June 2024 election as the PVV's fourth candidate. The party won six seats, and Kruis was sworn in on 16 July.

=== European Parliament committees ===
- Committee on International Trade
- Committee on Petitions
- Delegation for relations with the countries of the Andean Community
- Committee on the Internal Market and Consumer Protection (substitute)
- Delegation to the EU–Türkiye Joint Parliamentary Committee (substitute)

== Electoral history ==
Electoral history of Sebastian Kruis
Year	Body	Party	Pos.	Votes	Result		Ref.
Year	Body	Party	Pos.	Votes	Party seats	Individual	Ref.
2021	House of Representatives	Party for Freedom	48	93	17	Lost	
2024	European Parliament	Party for Freedom	4	9,243	6	Won	
