= Ton Diepeveen =

Dutch politician (born 1957)

Ton Diepeveen MEP
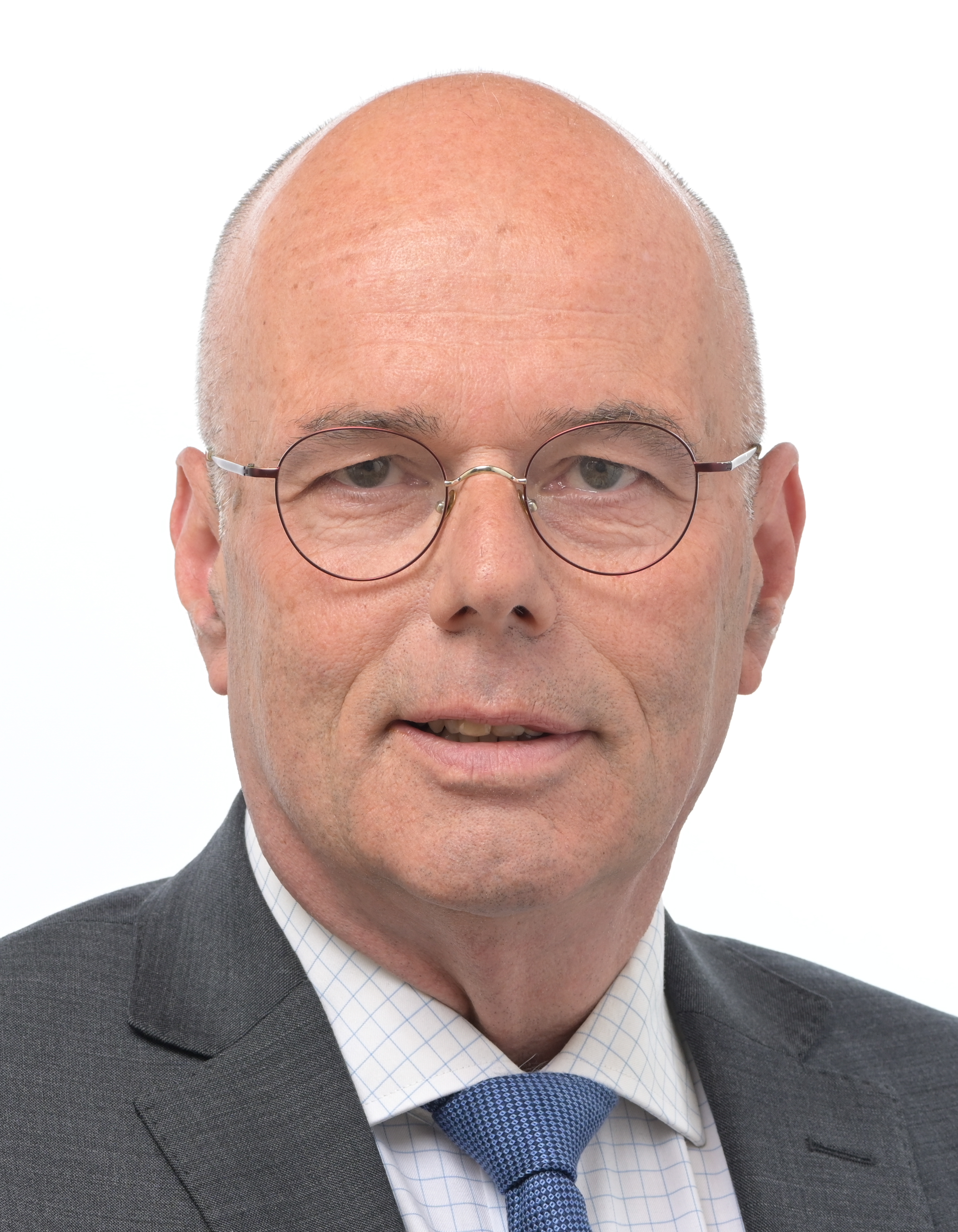
- Official portrait, 2024

Member of the European Parliament for the Netherlands
- Incumbent
- Assumed office 16 July 2024

Member of the Provincial Council of Gelderland
- In office 20 March 2019 – 15 July 2024

Personal details
- Born: 27 August 1957 (age 68) Veenendaal, Netherlands
- Party: Party for Freedom
- Education: Erasmus University Rotterdam

Ton Diepeveen (born 27 August 1957) is a Dutch politician of the Party for Freedom (PVV) who became a member of the European Parliament after the 2024 election.

Diepeveen graduated with a degree in law from the Erasmus University Rotterdam and worked as a fraud investigator and later as a company director before entering politics. He served in the Provincial Council of Gelderland from 2019 to 2024, where he was group leader of the party. Diepeveen ran for the European Parliament in June 2024 as the PVV's sixth candidate. The party secured six seats, but Diepeveen was not directly elected as lijstduwer Geert Wilders met the preference vote threshold. Wilders declined his seat, and Diepeveen was sworn into the European Parliament on 16 July 2024.

== European Parliament committees ==
- Committee on Fisheries
- Committee on Legal Affairs
- Delegation to the EU–UK Parliamentary Partnership Assembly
- Committee on Agriculture and Rural Development (substitute)
- Delegation for relations with Central Asia (substitute)

== Electoral history ==
Electoral history of Ton Diepeveen
Year	Body	Party	Pos.	Votes	Result		Ref.
Year	Body	Party	Pos.	Votes	Party seats	Individual	Ref.
2024	European Parliament	Party for Freedom	6	5,590	6	Lost (Note: Diepeveen was not elected despite his party's result due to Geert Wilders meeting the threshold for preference votes. However, he did become a member of the body as Wilders declined his seat.)	
