= Rachel Blom =

Dutch politician (born 1987)

Rachel Blom MEP
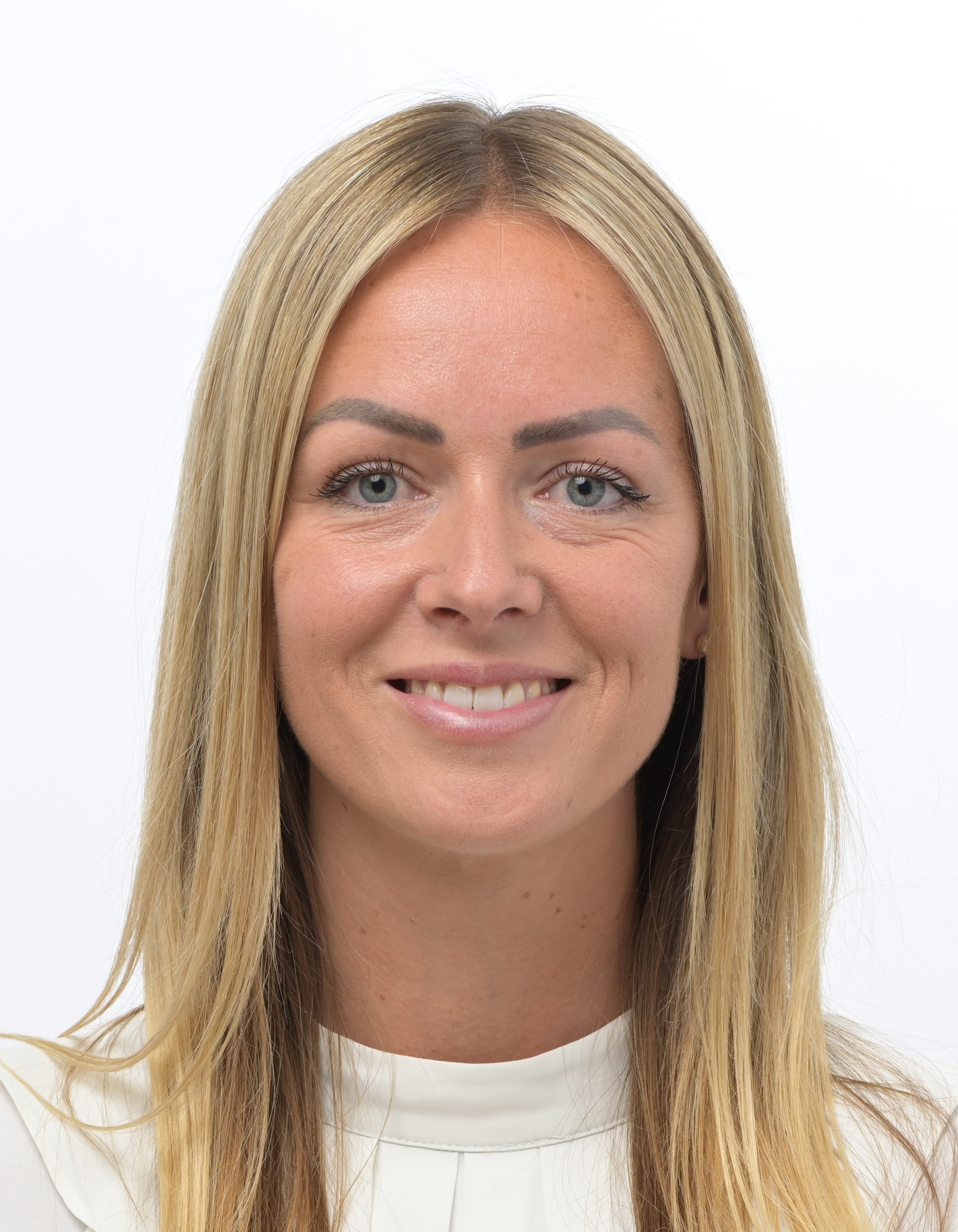
- Official portrait, 2024

Member of the European Parliament
- Incumbent
- Assumed office 16 July 2024
- Parliamentary group: Patriots for Europe
- Constituency: Netherlands

Personal details
- Born: 7 October 1987 (age 38) Rotterdam, Netherlands
- Party: Party for Freedom
- Education: Erasmus University Rotterdam

Rachel M. Blom (born 7 October 1987) is a Dutch politician of the Party for Freedom (PVV) who was elected member of the European Parliament in 2024.

== Early life and career ==
Blom was born in Rotterdam in 1987. She studied at Erasmus University Rotterdam and had several jobs in the insurance industry. She was a claims client relationship manager at Chubb Limited when she ran for the European Parliament in June 2024 as the PVV's fifth candidate. The party secured six seats, and Blom was sworn in on 16 July.

=== European Parliament committees ===
- Committee on Employment and Social Affairs
- Committee on Transport and Tourism
- Delegation for relations with Bosnia and Herzegovina and Kosovo
  - EU–Bosnia and Herzegovina Stabilisation and Association Parliamentary Committee
  - EU–Kosovo Stabilisation and Association Parliamentary Committee
- Delegation for relations with Canada (substitute)

== Electoral history ==
Electoral history of Rachel Blom
Year	Body	Party	Pos.	Votes	Result		Ref.
Year	Body	Party	Pos.	Votes	Party seats	Individual	Ref.
2024	European Parliament	Party for Freedom	5	16,359	6	Won	
2025	House of Representatives	Party for Freedom	77	233	26	Lost	
