= Ufuk Kâhya =

Dutch politician (born 1988)

Member of the European Parliament
- Incumbent
- Assumed office 30 June 2026
- Preceded by: Bas Eickhout
- Constituency: Netherlands

Personal details
- Born: 19 January 1988 (age 38)
- Party: Progressief Nederland (since 2026)
- Other political affiliations: GroenLinks (until 2026)

Ufuk Kâhya (born 19 January 1988) is a Dutch politician serving as a member of the European Parliament since 2026. From 2018 to 2023, he was an alderman of 's-Hertogenbosch.
