= Dirk Gotink =

Dutch politician (born 1982

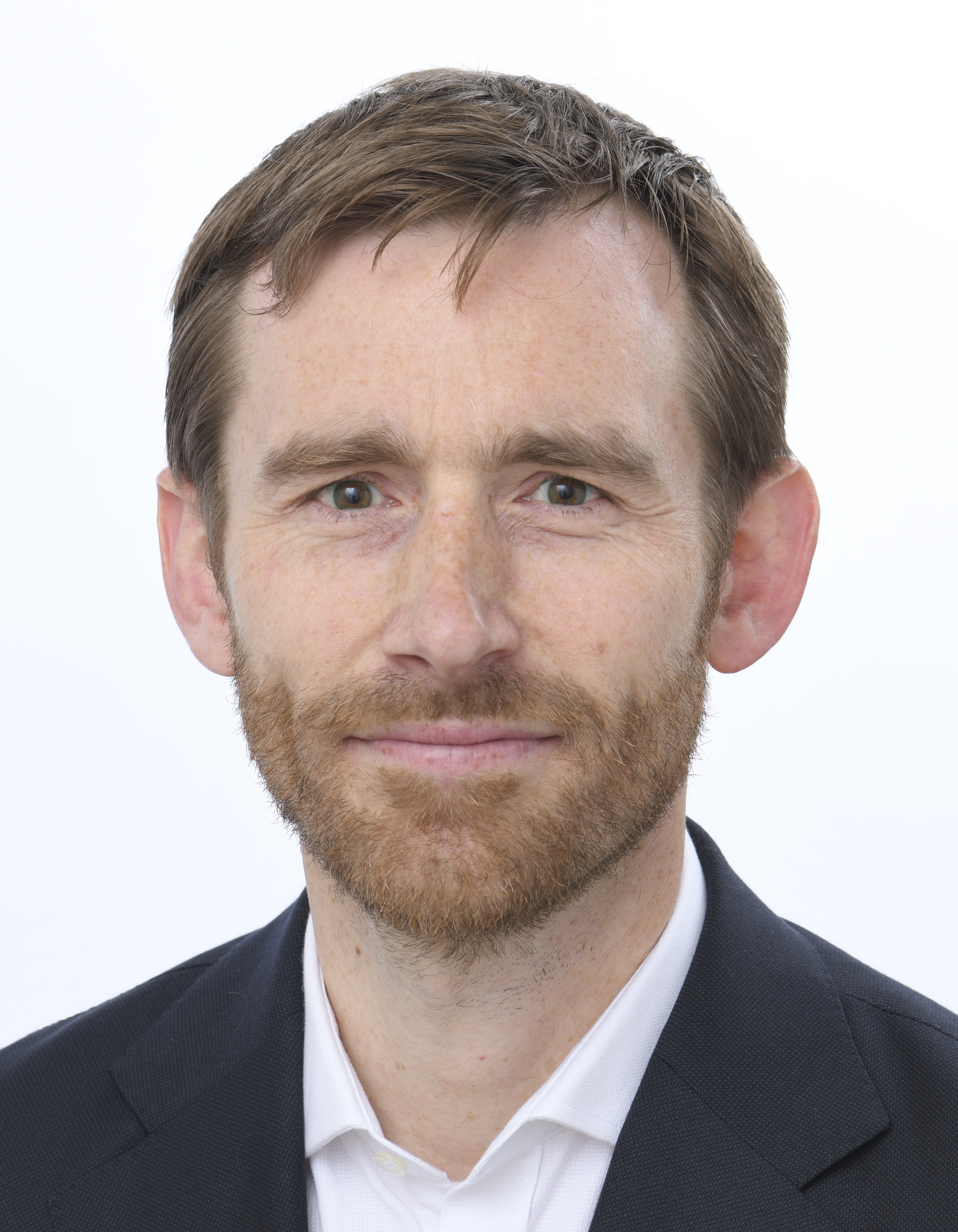
- Official portrait, 2024

Member of the European Parliament
- Incumbent
- Assumed office 16 July 2024
- Parliamentary group: European People's Party Group
- Constituency: Netherlands

Personal details
- Born: 13 August 1981 (age 45) Haarlem, Netherlands
- Party: Independent (since 2026)
- Other political affiliations: NSC (2023–2026); CDA (until 2023)
- Occupation: Politician; political staffer

Dirk Gotink (Dutch: [ˈdɪr(ə)k ˈxoːtɪŋk]; born 13 August 1981) is a Dutch politician serving as a member of the European Parliament. Prior to October 2026, he was a member of the Christian-democratic New Social Contract (NSC) party. He was also a member of the Christian Democratic Appeal (CDA) before 2023.

== Early career ==
Gotink worked in European politics for seventeen years, including as spokesperson for the European People's Party (EPP) and as assistant to Manfred Weber.

== Political career ==
Gotink first ran for the European Parliament in 2014 on the CDA's party list.

When Pieter Omtzigt, a former CDA member, founded the New Social Contract (NSC) party in August 2023, Gotink joined. At the time, he argued the CDA had lost its critical voice with regard to the European Union. Gotink was chosen to serve as NSC's lead candidate in the June 2024 European Parliament election. He planned to contain the EU's climate policy and financial solidarity between member states in an energy transition. In the campaign, he also decried European regulations, stating they threatened Dutch traditions such as Easter fires and rookworst. NSC won one seat in the election, joining the European People's Party Group, and Gotink was elected.

In 2026, Gotink represented the European Parliament in the selection process that decided on Lille as the host city of the newly established European Union Customs Authority (EUCA).

In October 2026, Gotink would leave his party, the New Social Contract, due to its decision to explore collaboration with Eurosceptic politician Mona Keijzer. This would leave the NSC without representation in the European Parliament.

=== European Parliament committees ===
- Committee on Economic and Monetary Affairs
- Delegation for relations with Afghanistan
- Committee on Budgetary Control (substitute)
- Committee on the Internal Market and Consumer Protection (substitute)
- Delegation to the EU–Mexico Joint Parliamentary Committee (substitute)

== Electoral history ==
Electoral history of Dirk Gotink
Year	Body	Party	Pos.	Votes	Result		Ref.
Year	Body	Party	Pos.	Votes	Party seats	Individual	Ref.
2024	European Parliament	New Social Contract	1	136,176	1	Won	
2025	House of Representatives	New Social Contract	30	35	0	Lost	
