= Marieke Ehlers =

Dutch politician (born 1988)

Marieke Ehlers MEP
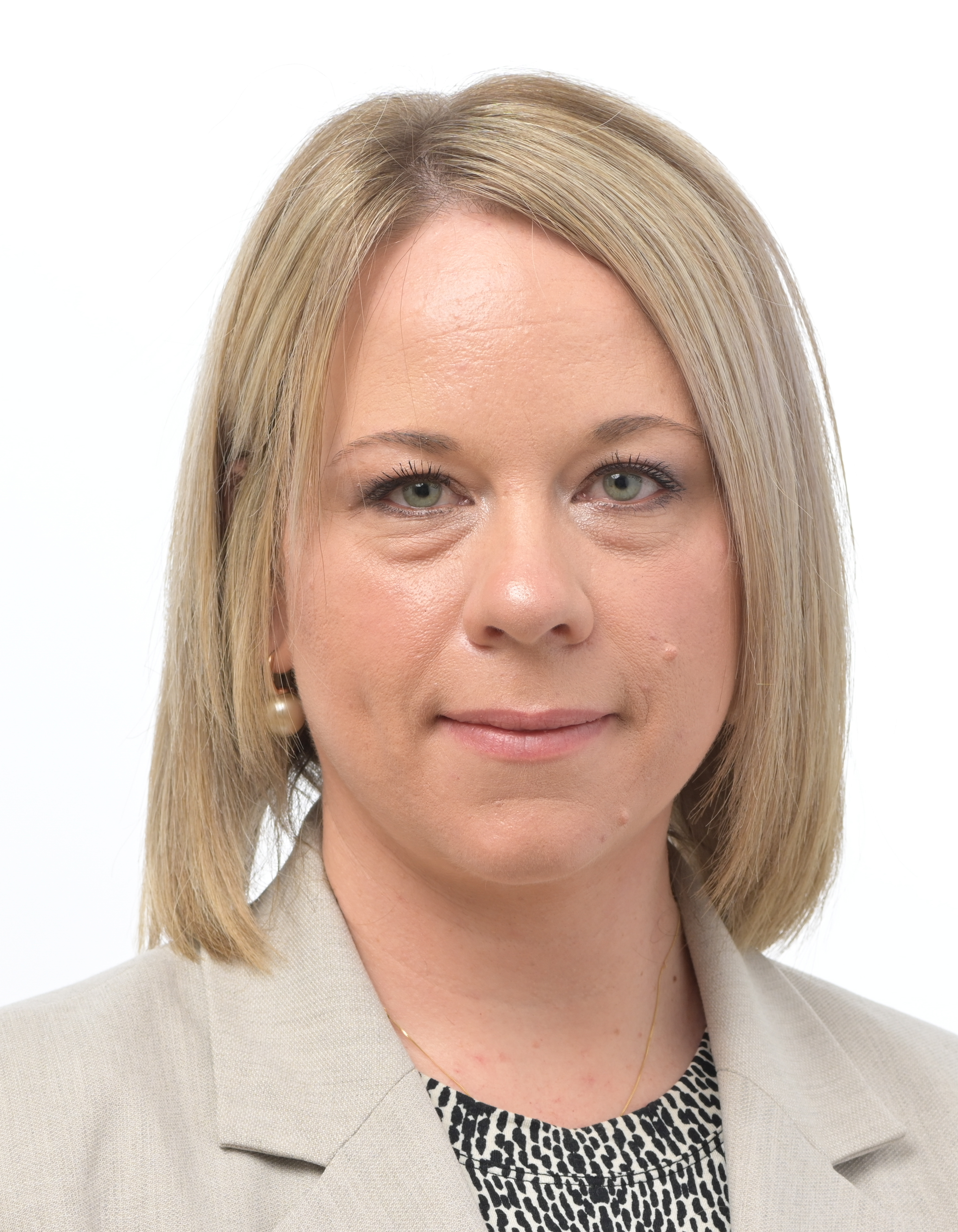
- Ehlers in 2024

Member of the European Parliament
- Incumbent
- Assumed office 16 July 2024
- Parliamentary group: Patriots for Europe
- Constituency: Netherlands

Personal details
- Born: Marieke Roos; 6 May 1988 (age 38) South Africa
- Citizenship: Netherlands
- Party: Party for Freedom
- Education: The Hague University of Applied Sciences; University of Kent; University of Johannesburg

Marieke Roos (née Ehlers; born 6 May 1988) is a Dutch educator and politician of the Party for Freedom (PVV) who was elected a member of the European Parliament (MEP) in 2024.

== Biography ==
=== Early life and career ===
Ehlers was born and raised in South Africa. She graduated from The Hague University of Applied Sciences in the Netherlands with a bachelor's degree in international and European law. After this, she studied at the University of Kent for a master's degree in international law and international relations and then completed an LL.D. in law at the University of Johannesburg, with a thesis on nuclear weapons and nuclear energy in international law, while working part-time as a lecturer. She subsequently worked as a lecturer in Johannesburg, and a law clerk at the Constitutional Court of South Africa. She later moved back to Europe and worked as a policy advisor in the European Parliament for six years.

=== Political career ===
Ehlers was elected to the European Parliament in the June 2024 election for the PVV, which subsequently joined the Patriots for Europe group. She is on the following European Parliament committees:

- Committee on Civil Liberties, Justice and Home Affairs
- Delegation for relations with the United States
- Committee on Development (substitute)
- Committee on Constitutional Affairs (substitute)
- Delegation for relations with the Pan-African Parliament (substitute)

== Electoral history ==
Electoral history of Marieke Ehlers
Year	Body	Party	Pos.	Votes	Result		Ref.
Year	Body	Party	Pos.	Votes	Party seats	Individual	Ref.
2024	European Parliament	Party for Freedom	2	56,682	6	Won	
2025	House of Representatives	Party for Freedom	78	191	26	Lost	
