= Alisha Müller =

Dutch politician (born 1993)

Member of the House of Representatives
- Incumbent
- Assumed office 25 February 2026
- Preceded by: Eelco Heinen

Personal details
- Born: 25 June 1993 (age 32)
- Party: People's Party for Freedom and Democracy

Alisha Müller (born 25 June 1993) is a Dutch politician serving as a member of the House of Representatives since 2026. She previously served as head of the Policy and Operations Evaluation Department of the Ministry of Defence.
