= Mieke Andriese =

Dutch politician

Member of the European Parliament
- Incumbent
- Assumed office 20 November 2025
- Preceded by: Sebastiaan Stöteler
- Constituency: Netherlands

Personal details
- Party: PVV (since 2024)
- Other political affiliations: FvD (2019–2020)

Mieke Andriese is a Dutch politician serving as a member of the European Parliament since 2025. From 2024 to 2025, she served as assistant to Sebastiaan Stöteler.
