= Netherlands (European Parliament constituency) =

Dutch constituency of the European Parliament

- European Parliament constituency
- Location among the current constituencies
- Member state: Netherlands
- Created: 1979
- MEPs: 25 (1979–1994); 31 (1994–2004); 27 (2004–2009); 25 (2009–2011); 26 (2011–2020); 29 (2020–2024); 31 (2024–present)

The Netherlands is a European Parliament constituency for elections in the European Union covering the member state of Netherlands. It is currently represented by 31 Members of the European Parliament. Until the 2009 European Parliament election, it excluded the Dutch in the Netherlands Antilles and Aruba.

== Background information ==
Year	Electorate	Votes	Turnout	Blank votes	Invalid votes	%	Valid	%	Lists	Combined lists	Electoral alliances
1979	9,808,176	5,700,603	58.12%	33,300		0.59%	5,667,303	99.41%	10	0	1
1984	10,485,014	5,334,582	50.88%	37,833		0.71%	5,296,749	99.29%	9	2	1
1989	11,099,123	5,270,374	47.48%	28,041		0.53%	5,242,333	99.47%	10	2	0
1994	11,618,677	4,146,730	35.69%	13,173		0.32%	4,133,557	99.68%	11	1	0
1999	11,862,864	3,560,764	30.02%	16,356		0.46%	3,544,408	99.54%	11	1	0
2004	12,168,878	4,777,121	39.26%	11,444		0.24%	4,765,677	99.76%	15	1	3
2009	12,445,497	4,573,743	36.75%	10,013	9,866	0.44%	4,553,864	99.56%	17	1	3
2014	12,815,496	4,782,251	37.32%	16,786	11,719	0.60%	4,753,746	99.40%	19	1	2
2019	13,164,688	5,519,776	41.93%	10,267	11,696	0.40%	5,497,813	99.60%	16	2	NA
2024	13,542,363	6,253,467	46.18%	9,662	11,607	0.34%	6,232,198	99.66%	20	2	NA

List	Election year									
List	1979	1984	1989	1994	1999	2004	2009	2014	2019	2024
Christian Democratic Appeal	10	8	10	10	9	7	5	5	4	3
Labour Party	9	9	8	8	6	7	5	3	6	
GroenLinks				1	4	2	3	2	3	
GroenLinks–PvdA										8
People's Party for Freedom and Democracy	4	5	3	6	6	4	3	3	4	4
Democrats 66	2		1	4	2	1	3	4	2	3
C.P.N. Green Party Netherlands P.P.R. P.S.P.		2								
Rainbow (ppr-psp-cpn-evp-gpn-indep.)			2							
SGP, GPV and RPF		1	1	2	3					
Christian Union – Reformed Political Party						2	2	2	2	
Reformed Political Party										1
Socialist Party					1	2	2	2		
Europe Transparent						2				
Party for Freedom							4	4		6
Party for the Animals								1	1	1
50PLUS									1	
Forum for Democracy									3	
Farmer–Citizen Movement										2
Volt Netherlands										2
New Social Contract										1
Total	25	25	25	31	31	27	25	26	26	31

== Elections ==
=== 1979 ===
The 1979 European election was the first direct election to the European Parliament to be held and hence the first time the Netherlands had voted. Four parties won seats: the conservative liberal People's Party for Freedom and Democracy (VVD), the progressive liberal Democrats 66 (D66), the Christian-democratic Christian Democratic Appeal (CDA) and the social-democratic Labour Party. Five other nationally represented parties competed but won no seats. 58.1% of the Dutch population turned out on election day.

=== 1984 ===
The 1984 European election was the second election to the European Parliament and the second for the Netherlands. In these elections two alliances formed successful common lists:

- left-wing parties Communist Party of the Netherlands (CPN), Pacifist Socialist Party (PSP) and Political Party of Radicals (PPR) parties (Green Progressive Accord) (won 2 seats)
- the orthodox Protestant Political Reformed Party (SGP), Reformed Political Alliance (GPV), Reformatory Political Federation (RPF) (won 1 seat)

The progressive liberal Democrats 66 (D66) lost its two seats and disappeared from the parliament. 50.9% of the Dutch population turned out.

=== 1989 ===
The 1989 European election was the third election to the European Parliament and the third for the Netherlands. The conservative liberal People's Party for Freedom and Democracy (VVD) lost seats to the progressive liberal Democrats 66 (D66), which returned to the European parliament after a five-year absence. 47.5% of the electorate turned out.

=== 1994 ===
The 1994 European election was the fourth election to the European Parliament and the fourth for the Netherlands. The liberal People's Party for Freedom and Democracy (VVD) and Democrats 66 (D66) parties and the orthodox Protestant alliance of Political Reformed Party, Reformatory Political Federation and Reformed Political Alliance profited from the increase in the number of seats. While the Christian Democratic Appeal and the Labour Party lost a considerable number of votes, but remained stable in terms of seats. 35.7% of Dutch voters turned out on election day.

=== 1999 ===
The 1999 European election was the fifth election to the European Parliament and the fifth for the Netherlands. With only 30 percent of the population showing up, the voter turnout hit an all-time low for Dutch elections on the national level. In the election, GreenLeft performed particularly well quadrupling their seats from one to four, the Socialist Party also won its first seat. These gains were made at the cost of the Christian Democratic Appeal, Democrats 66 and the Labour Party, which lost one, two and two seats respectively.

=== 2004 ===
The 2004 European election was the sixth election to the European Parliament and the sixth for the Netherlands. The election was held on 10 June 2004. The ruling centre-right parties, the Christian Democratic Appeal and the People's Party for Freedom and Democracy polled poorly, while the opposition Labour Party and Socialist Party gained ground. The anti-fraud party Europe Transparent of whistle blower Paul van Buitenen unexpectedly won two seats.

=== 2009 ===
The 2009 European election was the seventh election to the European Parliament and the seventh for the Netherlands.

=== 2014 ===
The 2014 European election was the eighth election to the European Parliament and the eighth for the Netherlands. The Christian Democratic Appeal won the most seats and was seen as the winner of the 2014 elections, but was overtaken by Democrats 66 in terms of numbers of votes. The Christian Democratic Appeal won an extra seat thanks to their electoral alliance with Christian Union – Reformed Political Party (Christian Union-SGP). The eurosceptic Party for Freedom (PVV) was the biggest loser, although it only lost 1 seat. In contrast to other European countries, the eurosceptic movement did worse than in previous elections.

=== 2019 ===
The 2019 European election was the ninth election to the European Parliament and the ninth for the Netherlands.

=== 2024 ===
The 2024 European election was the tenth overall and in the Netherlands, and it was held on 6 June. The Labour Party and GroenLinks participated with the combined GroenLinks–PvdA list and received a plurality of 8 seats or 21% of the vote. The Party for Freedom, which had not won any seats in the previous election, came in second with 6 seats or 17% of the vote. The Farmer–Citizen Movement, Volt Netherlands, and New Social Contract secured European Parliament seats for the first time, while the Christian Union, Forum for Democracy, and 50PLUS lost their representation. Voter turnout rose to 46.2%.
