= List of members of the House of Representatives of the Netherlands for Forum for Democracy =

The members of the House of Representatives of the Netherlands for Forum for Democracy is a list of all members of the House of Representatives who have been members of the Forum for Democracy parliamentary group.

== Members ==
Member	Term start	Term end	Ref.
Thierry Baudet	23 March 2017	12 January 2025	
Thierry Baudet	1 April 2025	11 January 2026	
Iem al Biyati	1 September 2026		
Ralf Dekker	23 August 2022	27 March 2023	
Ralf Dekker	19 November 2024	31 March 2025	
Ralf Dekker	12 November 2025		
Peter van Duyvenvoorde	12 November 2025		
Olaf Ephraim	31 March 2021	13 May 2021 (Note: Left the parliamentary group and continued as part of Groep Van Haga.)	
Wybren van Haga	30 November 2020 (Note: Was previously member of the VVD and independent member.)	13 May 2021	
Theo Hiddema	23 March 2017	24 November 2020	
Pepijn van Houwelingen	31 March 2021	5 December 2023	
Pepijn van Houwelingen	18 January 2024	18 November 2024	
Pepijn van Houwelingen	1 April 2025	31 August 2025	
Pepijn van Houwelingen	12 November 2025		
Frederik Jansen	31 March 2021	16 January 2024	
Frederik Jansen	12 November 2025	12 May 2026	
Simone Kerseboom	31 March 2021	15 August 2022	
Simone Kerseboom	28 March 2023	5 December 2023	
Gideon van Meijeren	31 March 2021		
Tom Russcher	15 January 2026		
Milan Schenk	19 May 2026		
Hans Smolders	31 March 2021	13 May 2021	
Lidewij de Vos	16 January 2025	31 March 2025	
Lidewij de Vos	4 September 2025	5 August 2026	

== Parliamentary leaders ==
Member	Term start	Term end	Ref.
Thierry Baudet	23 March 2017	12 January 2025	
Thierry Baudet	2 April 2025	3 September 2025	
Ralf Dekker	6 August 2026		
Gideon van Meijeren	29 January 2025	1 April 2025	
Lidewij de Vos	4 September 2025	5 August 2026	
