= Baudet =

Baudet (pronounced [bodɛ]) is a French surname. Notable people with the surname include:

- Cristina Baudet (born 1991), Catalan footballer
- Étienne Baudet (c. 1636–1711), French engraver
- Jacques Baudet-Lafarge (1803–1867), French politician
- Jean Baptiste Charlemagne-Baudet (1734–1789), French-Russian sculptor
- Jean C. Baudet (1944–2021), Belgian philosopher and writer
- Julien Baudet (born 1979), French footballer and manager
- Mathieu Baudet-Lafarge (1765–1837), French politician
- Thierry Baudet (born 1983), Dutch politician, writer and conspiracy theorist

== See also ==
- Biaudet
