= European Young Conservatives =

Political youth organization

- Chairman: Alexander Redpath
- Deputy Chairman: Alexios Karamanolas
- Vice-Chairman: Gabriel Kroon (Czech Republic) Jan Smitka (Israel) Raz Granot (United Kingdom) Nathan Redmond (Poland) Berenika Grabowska (Netherlands) Frederik Jansen (Georgia (country)) Khatia Lachashvili (United Kingdom) Lukhani Rogol (Italy) Fabio Roscani
- Secretary General: (Poland) Michał Szpądrowski
- Treasurer: (United Kingdom) Mo Metcalf Fisher
- Founded: August 1993
- Split from: Democrat Youth Community of Europe
- Headquarters: Margaret Thatcher House, 85 Western Road, Romford, London, RM1 3LS; United Kingdom
- Ideology: Conservatism; Euroscepticism
- International affiliation: International Young Democrat Union
- Website: www.eycorganisation.com

The European Young Conservatives (EYC) is a grouping of youth wings of conservative and centre-right political parties in Europe.

As of 2014, the group has a membership of 25 political youth organisations from 22 countries and territories, in addition to four associated members. The EYC is independent and not affiliated with any European political party, but maintains a non-exclusive relationship with the European Conservatives and Reformists Party.

The EYC is a full member of the International Young Democrat Union.

== History ==
The EYC was founded in August 1993 by the youth wings of the British Conservative Party, Danish Conservative People's Party, and Icelandic Independence Party, under the leadership of Andrew Rosindell, then-chairman of the UK's Young Conservatives.

It emerged from a split in the centre-right Democrat Youth Community of Europe (DEMYC), which separated into two factions: the larger part, following a broadly Christian democratic philosophy; and the smaller part, led by Rosindell, following a broadly conservative philosophy. Two crucial points of disagreement were the scope of economic liberalisation and the desirability of a federal Europe.

From 1993 to 1997, the group was led by Rosindell. The group gave training to newly established democratic political parties in Russia, Belarus, and Azerbaijan. It was refounded much later by Oliver Cooper.

The EYC generally holds three conference events per year, with the largest being the autumn Freedom Summit.

=== Freedom Summit ===
- Cambridge, United Kingdom – 2014
- Cambridge, United Kingdom – 2015
- Porto, Portugal – 2016
- Warsaw, Poland – 2017

=== Summer Camp ===
- Stockholm, Sweden – 2014
- Tbilisi, Georgia 2016
- Prague, Czech Republic – 2017
- Leptokarya, Greece – 2018
- Leptokarya, Greece – 2019

=== Annual Congress ===
- Warsaw, Poland – 2012
- Prague, Czech Republic – 2013
- Istanbul, Turkey – 2014
- Prague, Czech Republic – 2015
- Brussels, Belgium – 2016
- London, England – 2017
- Warsaw, Poland – 2018
- Amsterdam, Netherlands – 2019

Since 2016, an internal conflict between civic and ethnic nationalists has emerged within the EYC. The ethnic nationalists were opposed to the membership of Turkish and Israeli parties and claimed the EYC has "replaced anti-immigration politics with free market capitalism". Resulting from the dispute, the Finns Party Youth announced its withdrawal on 18 May 2017, with its leader Samuli Voutila saying: "We cannot be members in the same organization as the new Turkish sultan’s youth wing, when it acts against European values." On 12 June, the Estonian movement Blue Awakening sent a letter to the EYC demanding the expulsion of the Turkish AK Party Youth within seven days. The letter was later published on Richard B. Spencer's website Altright.com.

== Membership ==
The EYC has twenty-five member organisations:

Country	Organisation	Mother party	European party
Armenia	Prosperous Armenia Youth	Prosperous Armenia	ACRE
Belarus	BPF Youth	BPF Party	ACRE
Belgium	Jong N-VA	N-VA	EFA
Bulgaria	YBWC	–	None
Czech Republic	Young Conservatives	Civic Democratic Party	ACRE
Faroe Islands	Huxa	People's Party	ACRE
Georgia	Young Conservatives	Conservative Party of Georgia	ACRE
Germany	Young Reformer	Alliance for Progress and Renewal	ACRE
Iceland	Young Independents	Independence Party	ACRE
Italy	Conservatives and Reformists	Conservatives and Reformists	ACRE
Italy	National Youth	Brothers of Italy	ACRE
Italy	Youth for Freedom	–	None
Israel	Likud Youth	Likud	ACRE (regional partner)
Latvia	For Fatherland and Freedom/LNNK Youth Club	For Fatherland and Freedom/LNNK	None
Liechtenstein	Junge FBP	Progressive Citizens' Party	None
Lithuania	Electoral Action of Poles in Lithuania Youth Organisation	Electoral Action of Poles in Lithuania	ACRE
Luxembourg	adrenalin, déi jonk adr	Alternative Democratic Reform Party	ACRE
The Netherlands	Jongerenorganisatie Forum voor Democratie	Forum for Democracy	None
Norway	Progress Party's Youth	Progress Party	None
Poland	Law and Justice Youth Forum	Law and Justice	ACRE
Portugal	People's Youth	Democratic and Social Centre – People's Party	EPP
Romania	New Republic Youth	New Republic	ACRE
Sweden	Young Swedes SDU	Sweden Democrats	None
Switzerland	Young SVP	Swiss People's Party	None
United Kingdom	Young Conservatives	Conservative Party	ACRE
United Kingdom (Scotland)	Conservative Future Scotland	Scottish Conservative Party	ACRE
United Kingdom	Young Unionists	Ulster Unionist Party	ACRE

=== Associate members ===
Country	Organisation	Mother party
Australia	Young Liberals	Liberal Party of Australia
Canada	Young Conservatives	Conservative Party of Canada
New Zealand	New Zealand Young Nationals	New Zealand National Party
United States	Young Republicans	Republican Party
North Macedonia	United Youth for Macedonia	United for Macedonia

=== Former members ===
Country	Organisation	Mother party
Estonia	Blue Awakening	Conservative People's Party of Estonia
Finland	Finns Party Youth	Finns Party
Turkey	AK Party Youth	Justice and Development Party
