= Pepijn van Houwelingen =

Dutch politician (born 1980)

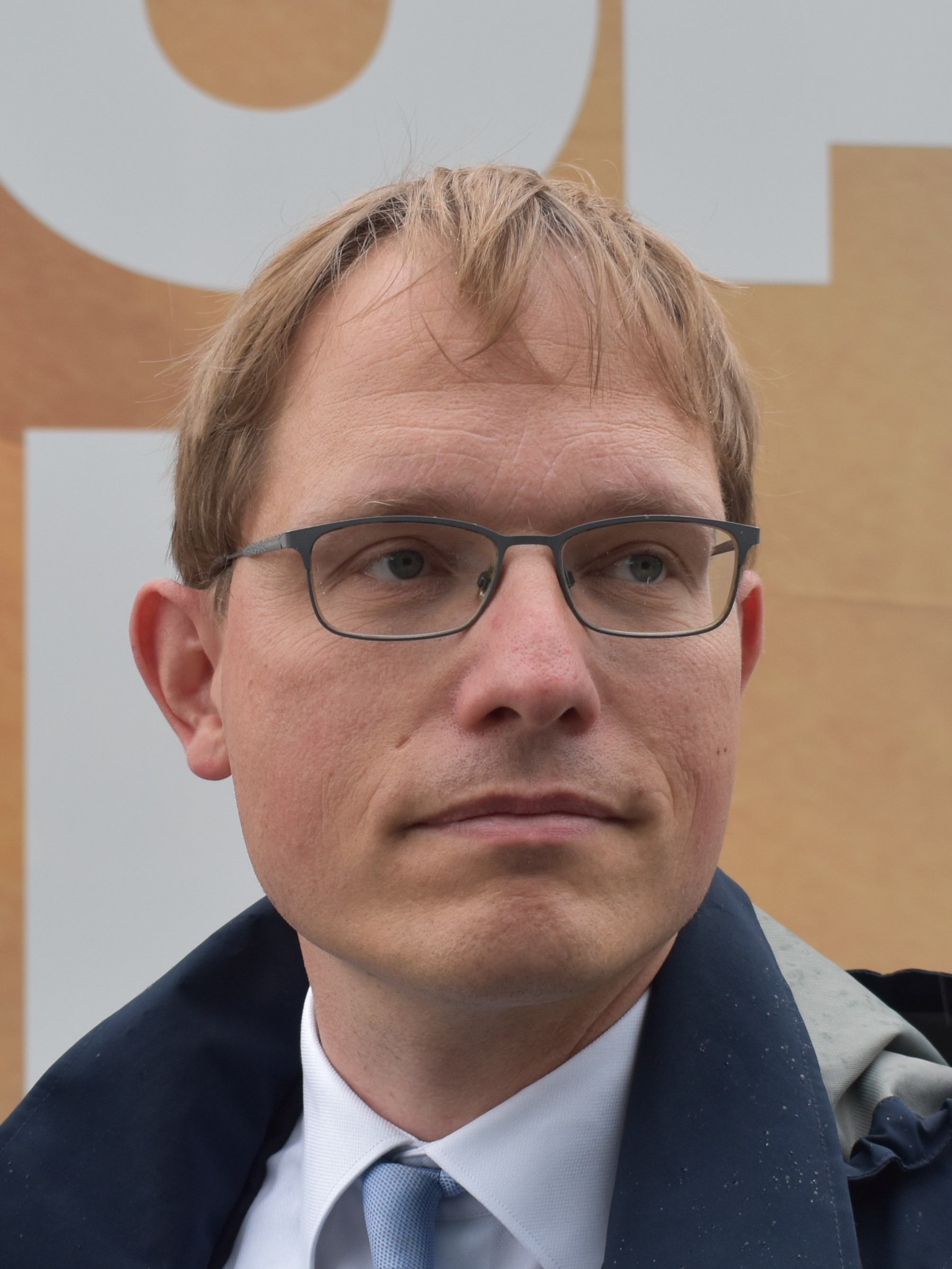
- Van Houwelingen in 2024

Member of the House of Representatives
- Incumbent
- Assumed office 12 November 2025
- In office 1 April 2025 – 31 August 2025
- Preceded by: Ralf Dekker
- Succeeded by: Lidewij de Vos
- In office 18 January 2024 – 18 November 2024
- Preceded by: Freek Jansen
- Succeeded by: Ralf Dekker
- In office 31 March 2021 – 5 December 2023

Personal details
- Born: Pepijn van Houwelingen; 24 February 1980 (age 46) Enschede, Netherlands
- Party: Forum for Democracy
- Children: 2
- Education: University of Twente; Erasmus University Rotterdam; Hiroshima City University
- Occupation: Politician; social researcher

Pepijn van Houwelingen (born 24 February 1980) is a Dutch politician of the conservative populist party Forum for Democracy (FvD). He was elected to the House of Representatives in March 2021, and he served as a member of parliament until he lost his bid for re-election in November 2023. He returned to the House between January 2024 and November 2024 and once more between April 2025 and September 2025. Van Houwelingen holds a doctorate and has worked for The Netherlands Institute for Social Research for a decade.

Van Houwelingen has received media attention for several controversial statements with regard to his opposition to globalist ideas and the government's measures to mitigate the COVID-19 pandemic.

== Early life and career ==
Van Houwelingen was born in 1980 in the Overijssel city Enschede and grew up in its Helmerhoek neighborhood with his three sisters and one brother. He attended the gymnasium of the secondary school Jacobus College starting in 1992 and studied industrial engineering at the University of Twente from 1998 until 2002. Van Houwelingen subsequently did another master's in (philosophy of) economics and another bachelor's in Japanese studies at the same time at Erasmus University Rotterdam. He moved to Japan in 2004 to study at the Hiroshima City University and obtained his PhD in 2009 after finishing his dissertation titled Social capital in Japan.

After finishing his studies, Van Houwelingen worked for half a year in demand and supply management at Canon Europe in Amstelveen. In February 2010, he took a job as a scientific assistant specialized in citizen participation at the Netherlands Institute for Social Research, a government agency, where he remained employed until he became an MP.

== Politics ==
While working at the Netherlands Institute for Social Research, Van Houwelingen voiced his opposition to what he perceived as the growing power of the European Union (EU). He also wrote that he favored direct democracy with referendums and that he supported decentralization.

Van Houwelingen was one of the initiators of Burgercomité-EU (EU citizen committee), which aims to make decisions surrounding the EU more democratic. After a law was passed that made it possible to trigger an advisory referendum, the organization cooperated with GeenStijl and Forum for Democracy to get a referendum on the approval of the European Union–Ukraine Association Agreement. The referendum was held in 2016 after enough signatures had been collected, and Burgercomité-EU campaigned against the agreement. Van Houwelingen also co-authored a manifesto opposing it. A few weeks after the referendum, NRC Handelsblad revealed that a novel by Van Houwelingen had been published in 2010 under the pseudonym Vossius. The book's main character argues in favor of city-states, discrimination of minorities, oppression of women, and the abolition of human rights, and he calls the EU the source of many evils.

At the end of 2019, Van Houwelingen was involved in the establishment of the broadcasting corporation Ongehoord Nederland (Unheard Netherlands), which would become part of the Dutch public broadcasting system. Van Houwelingen was a guest during its first broadcast on 22 February 2022.

=== First House term ===
In the 2021 general election, Van Houwelingen was Forum for Democracy's eighth candidate. He was elected, receiving 430 preference votes, and was sworn into the House of Representatives on 31 March 2021. Van Houwelingen became the FvD's spokesperson for the European Union, referendums, social affairs, and public health. Finances and economic affairs were added to his specialties when three Forum for Democracy MPs left the party in May 2021. He is a member of the United States contact group and of the Committees for Agriculture, Nature and Food Quality; for European Affairs; for Finance; for Health, Welfare and Sport; for the Interior; for Petitions; and for Social Affairs and Employment. While a House member, Van Houwelingen argued against scale-ups and mergers in the public sector, and an essay by him about the issue called Microfobie (Microphobia) was published by Forum for Democracy's scientific institute in 2021. His position led him to voice his opposition to the proposed merger of the municipalities of Scherpenzeel and Barneveld. He also attempted to undo a 2019 merger between Groningen en Haren through a bill, but it did not receive a House majority. Besides, Van Houwelingen opposed the power and influence held by supranational organizations such as the European Union, the World Health Organization, and the World Economic Forum, considering it to be a globalist power grab. In 2022, he introduced a bill in the House together with party leader Thierry Baudet to reintroduce consultative referendums comparable to those organized in Switzerland. Some parties complained that the bill remained vague on details, and the proposal was ultimately rejected.

During a legislative meeting in April 2021 about a mandatory quarantine for travelers returning to the Netherlands because of the COVID-19 pandemic, he called the measure totalitarian and compared its reasoning to that of the persecution of Jews during World War II. In November 2021, comments by Van Houwelingen during a House debate again stirred controversy. When Sjoerd Sjoerdsma (D66) asked him to distance himself from comparisons between measures to limit the spread of the coronavirus and the persecution of Jews, Van Houwelingen told him "Your time will come, because there will be tribunals." in reference to Sjoerdsma's support of the government's COVID-19 policy, which he described as criminal. He clarified after an adjournment that his statements were not intended as a personal threat to Sjoerdsma but that he does believe major crimes were being committed, which warrant an investigation. Later that day, Speaker of the House Vera Bergkamp wrote that threats and intimidation of any form are completely unacceptable and that she wanted a dialogue with the parliamentary groups about debate manners. This later led to a ban on threats in the House's rules of procedure. A motion by Van Houwelingen in December to rule out a vaccine mandate did not receive support from a House majority even though a majority opposed such a mandate at the time. Van Houwelingen sat on a committee to prepare a parliamentary inquiry into the governments approach to the corona pandemic. Media reported in February 2023 that some committee members had demanded the departure of Van Houwelingen and Wybren van Haga (BVNL) for promoting prejudiced views. The committee reconciled soon after, but the start of the inquiry was postponed indefinitely in June when only four parties had nominated an MP to take part. Van Houwelingen had been put forward by FvD.

In September 2022, Van Houwelingen posted a picture on Twitter of Ministers Ernst Kuipers and Karien van Gennip raising a flag of the United Nations' Sustainable Development Goals (SDGs) alongside the same picture where the flag had been replaced by the one of Nazi Germany. It was accompanied by the caption "The facade and reality". Both cabinet members filed a criminal complaint, and D66 parliamentary group leader Jan Paternotte pled for Van Houwelingen to be suspended as a House member through a complaint to the Board of Inquiry on Integrity for endangering the ministers. Van Houwelingen removed his social media post in favor of another one with the same image where the SDGs flag had been replaced by a communist hammer and sickle flag, stating this was a more appropriate comparison. He did not apologize for his original tweet but did call it possibly inappropriate and clumsy. Van Houwelingen received a €450 fine from the Public Prosecution Service for insult, which was converted into a suspended fine by a court in October 2024. He announced that he would appeal the decision.

=== 2023 general election ===
Van Houwelingen ran for re-election in November 2023, having been placed fourth on the party list. He did not receive a second term, as Forum for Democracy lost five of its eight seats. Freek Jansen, who was elected, stepped down in January 2024 to allow Van Houwelingen to help prepare a parliamentary inquiry into COVID-19 as a member of parliament for half a year. He was sworn in on 18 January. NOS reported that such a temporary switch unrelated to health reasons had not occurred in the House since 1977. The committee carrying out the inquiry first convened on 6 February 2024. Van Houwelingen stayed on beyond the half year initially planned. He stepped down on 18 November 2024 to assist his pregnant wife, and he was replaced until his return on 1 April 2025 by Ralf Dekker. Van Houwelingen resigned again on 31 August 2025 to allow lead candidate Lidewij de Vos to take up a House seat ahead of the October 2025 general election.

== Personal life ==
Van Houwelingen has two children and a Japanese wife, and he is a resident of The Hague.

== Electoral history ==
Electoral history of Pepijn van Houwelingen
Year	Body	Party	Pos.	Votes	Result		Ref.
Year	Body	Party	Pos.	Votes	Party seats	Individual	Ref.
2021	House of Representatives	Forum for Democracy	8	430	8	Won	
2023	House of Representatives	Forum for Democracy	4	5,608	3	Lost	
2024	European Parliament	Forum for Democracy	3	13,100	0	Lost	
2025	House of Representatives	Forum for Democracy	6	3,133	7	Won	
2026	The Hague Municipal Council	Forum for Democracy	17 (Note: Van Houwelingen participated as lijstduwer.)	671	1	Lost	

== Bibliography ==
- (2010, Aspekt) Oneigentijds (Not contemporary) under the pseudonym Vossius
- (2015, Blue Tiger) Manifest aan het volk van Nederland (Manifesto to the people of the Netherlands) with Arjan van Dixhoorn
- (2021, Renaissance Instituut) Microfobie: De cult van het kolossale (Microphobia: The cult of the colossal)
