= Simone Kerseboom =

Dutch politician (born 1984)

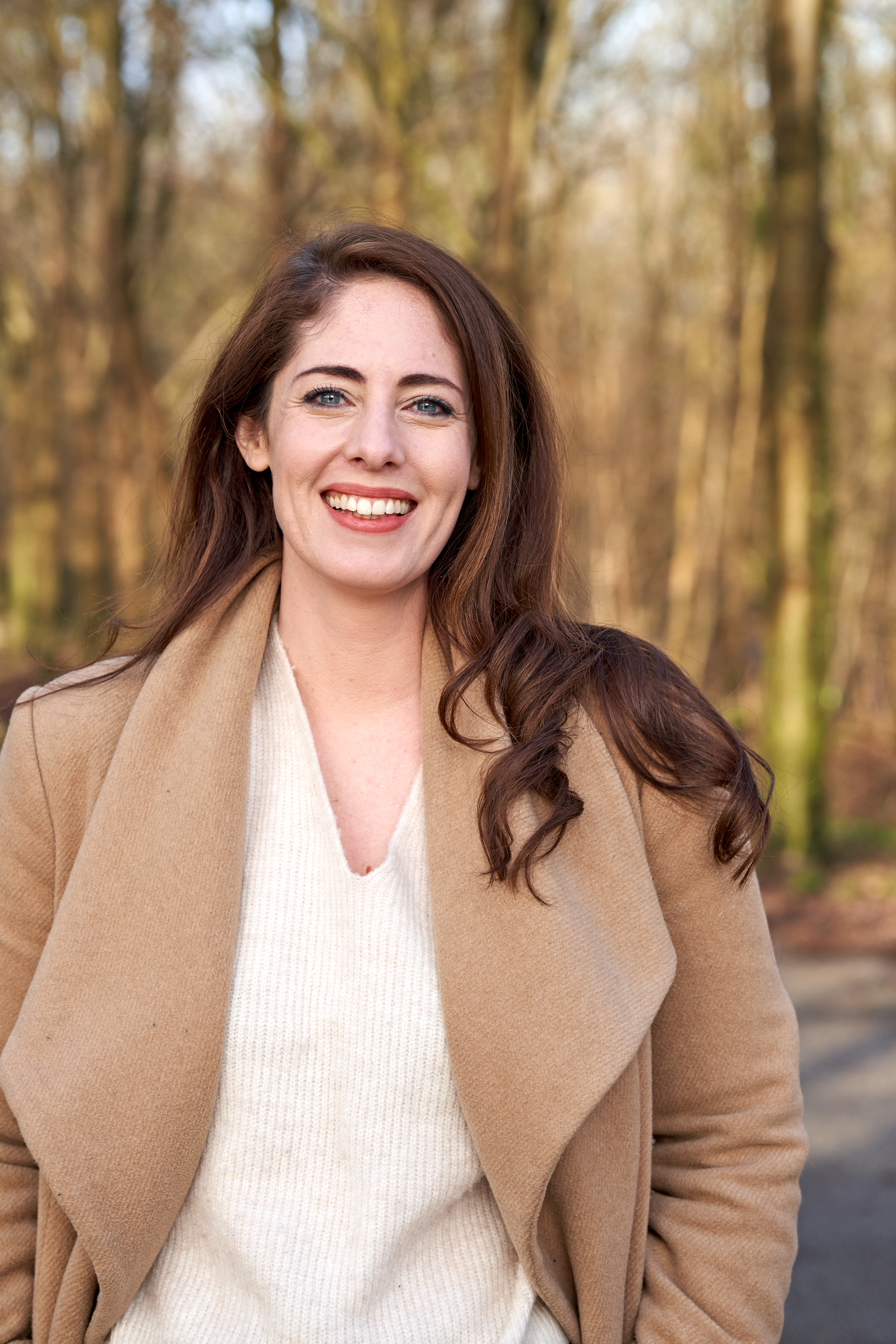
- Kerseboom (2021)

Member of the House of Representatives
- In office 28 March 2023 – 5 December 2023
- Preceded by: Ralf Dekker
- In office 31 March 2021 – 15 August 2022
- Succeeded by: Ralf Dekker

Member of the States of Limburg
- In office 6 December 2022 – 28 March 2023
- Preceded by: Ruud Burlet
- In office 28 March 2019 – 15 August 2022
- Succeeded by: Ruud Burlet

Personal details
- Born: 26 April 1984 (age 42) Roosendaal, Netherlands
- Party: Forum for Democracy
- Children: 1
- Education: Rhodes University
- Occupation: Politician; translator

Simone Kerseboom (born 26 April 1984) is a Dutch politician of the conservative populist party Forum for Democracy (FvD). She has been a member of the House of Representatives since the 2021 general election, and she served on the States of Limburg in the years 2019–2023. Kerseboom lived in South Africa for about twenty years and holds a doctorate from Rhodes University.

== Early life and career ==
Kerseboom was born in the North Brabant city of Roosendaal, and she moved with her parents and younger brother in 1996 to South Africa, the country where her mother was born. Her parents had met in South Africa in the 1970s, when her father was working for a dredging project at the port of Port Elizabeth, and he would later become a sea captain. Kerseboom studied history at Rhodes University, obtaining her doctorate after completing her dissertation about the nation state and national identity. Kerseboom returned to the Netherlands in 2015 and started working as an English–Dutch translator, editor, and writer. She owned a business called Novel Translations & Language Services.

== Politics ==
In 2017, Kerseboom wrote an opinion piece on the website ThePostOnline, in which she warned that "a shared national identity appears to be eroding rapidly" in the Netherlands. She wrote that "any remnants of national pride and values are systematically being replaced by a relentless supranationalism accompanied by the politically correct abstract concepts of multiculturalism and diversity which threaten Dutch sovereignty and national cohesion by emphasizing the differences between citizens instead of celebrating what we have in common".

Kerseboom joined Forum for Democracy and was their second candidate in Limburg in the 2019 provincial elections. The party, a newcomer, won seven seats, causing Kerseboom to receive a seat in the States of Limburg. When FvD's lead candidate left the council to become a member of the provincial executive, Kerseboom succeeded him as caucus leader. In November 2020, newspaper Het Parool published an article about extremist ideas held by members of the party's youth wing, which caused a crisis within Forum for Democracy. Four out of the seven FvD members of the States of Limburg left the party, while Kerseboom expressed her continuing support for party leader Thierry Baudet.

Forum for Democracy announced the following month that Kerseboom would appear fifth on its party list in the 2021 general election. She was elected, receiving 7,025 preference votes, and entered the House of Representatives on 31 March. She kept her seat in the States of Limburg but stepped down as caucus leader. Kerseboom became her party's spokesperson for foreign affairs, foreign trade, education, culture, and science, and she is on the Committees for Education, Culture and Science; for Foreign Affairs; and for Foreign Trade and Development Cooperation. She is also part of the contact groups United Kingdom and United States and of the Benelux Interparliamentary Consultative Council. Kerseboom violated social distancing rules – in effect due to the COVID-19 pandemic – after holding her maiden speech, when fellow member of parliament Gideon van Meijeren congratulated her by kissing and hugging her.

Kerseboom temporarily stepped down as member of the House of Representatives and the States of Limburg starting on 16 August 2022 because of her maternity leave. She extended her House leave after 6 December, but she returned to the States Provincial after the sixteen-week period Her House leave ended on 28 March 2023. Kerseboom sought a second term as provincial councilor in the March 2023 elections as Forum for Democracy's second candidate. However, her party won only one seat in Limburg, bringing an end to her tenure. Kerseboom was the party's third candidate in the May 2023 Senate election, and she announced that she would leave the House for a Senate membership – a part-time position – if she could not combine motherhood with a House seat. However, Kerseboom was not elected as her party won only one seat in the Senate, and she stayed in the House. She did not run for re-election in the November 2023 general election, citing personal reasons, and appeared on the party list only as a lijstduwer.

== Personal life ==
Kerseboom lives in the Limburg city of Maastricht. She was engaged, while a member of parliament, and her daughter was born in 2022.

== Electoral history ==
Electoral history of Simone Kerseboom
Year	Body	Party	Pos.	Votes	Result		Ref.
Year	Body	Party	Pos.	Votes	Party seats	Individual	Ref.
2021	House of Representatives	Forum for Democracy	5	7,025	8	Won	
2023	House of Representatives	Forum for Democracy	48	407	3	Lost (Note: Kerseboom participated as a lijstduwer.)	
