= Freek Jansen =

Dutch politician (born 1992)

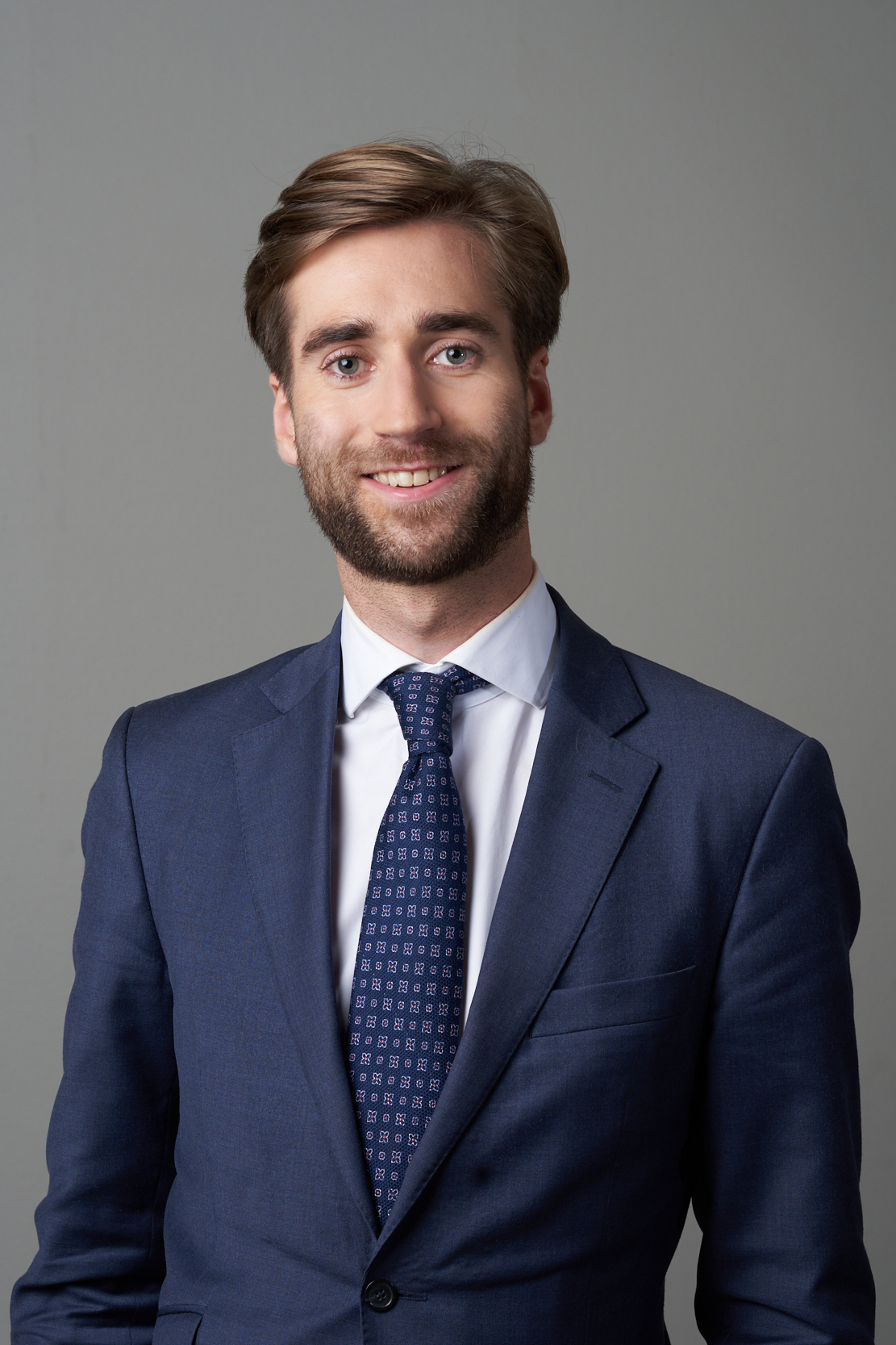
- Jansen in 2021

Member of the House of Representatives
- In office 31 March 2021 – 16 January 2024
- Succeeded by: Pepijn van Houwelingen
- In office 12 November 2025 – 12 May 2026
- Succeeded by: Milan Schenk

Chair of the youth wing of Forum for Democracy
- In office 2017–2021
- Preceded by: Office established
- Succeeded by: Iem al Biyati

Personal details
- Born: Frederik Jan Harm Jansen; 6 December 1992 (age 33) Oldebroek, Netherlands
- Party: Forum for Democracy
- Education: University of Amsterdam

Frederik Jan Harm "Freek" Jansen (born 6 December 1992) is a Dutch politician who served as a member of the House of Representatives (2021–2024 and 2025–2026) for the far-right Forum for Democracy (FvD) party. He previously chaired the FvD youth wing, the Jongerenorganisatie Forum voor Democratie (2017–2021).

Jansen studied political science and joined Forum for Democracy in 2016, when it became a political party from a think tank. He established its youth wing the following year and became its chair on 1 April 2017. Jansen also assisted the party's House caucus. Reports about extremist messages by members of the youth wing in 2020 led to criticism of Jansen and caused a split within FvD. Jansen became a member of the House of Representatives after he was elected in the 2021 general election. He was reelected in 2023, before he stepped down in January 2024, ceding his seat to Pepijn van Houwelingen. He was reelected in 2025, but left again in 2026

== Early life and non-political career ==
Jansen was born in 1992 in the Gelderland town of Oldebroek and grew up there. He studied political science at the University of Amsterdam starting in 2011. Jansen is an IT professional, and his first job was as an assistant to the clerk of the municipality of Westland.

== Politics ==
Jansen assisted Forum for Democracy when it transitioned into a political party in 2016. At that point, the organization had already been in existence as a think tank for a number of years. Jansen had first met party leader Thierry Baudet in September 2012 after Baudet's HJ Schoo-lezing, an annual lecture. Jansen founded the FvD's youth wing in 2017 and started serving as its chair. That same year, he also joined Forum for Democracy's caucus in the House of Representatives.

When Forum for Democracy received a plurality of the votes in the 2019 provincial elections, Jansen co-wrote Baudet's victory speech. He also ran for Member of the European Parliament in the 2019 election, ranking sixth on the party list, but he was not elected due to FvD winning three seats. It was revealed the following year that Jansen had helped arrange a controversial 2017 meeting between Baudet, Jansen, white supremacist Jared Taylor, and the Dutch alt-right association Erkenbrand. Besides, news magazine HP/De Tijd reported that his former superior at the Westland local council had written in a statement of defense for a labor dispute that Jansen had downplayed the Holocaust and had lauded the economic policies of Nazi Germany. Forum for Democracy called the statements "ridiculous and defamatory".

=== Extremist messages and 2021 general election ===
In April 2020, HP/De Tijd published an article about members of Forum for Democracy's youth wing being worried about right-wing extremist ideas that were expressed in WhatsApp group chats. In response, three members were expelled due to unacceptable statements and another three were suspended. The youth wing also expelled at least five whistleblowers. Forum for Democracy announced in October 2020 that Jansen would be the party's seventh candidate in the 2021 general election.

Newspaper Het Parool wrote the following month that antisemitic, Nazi, and homophobic thoughts were still being held and expressed by members of the FvD's youth wing. Its board started an internal investigation and suspended itself in the meantime. Jansen reacted by saying that there was no place in the organization for "racist and antisemitic ideas". Forum for Democracy politician Annabel Nanninga called the youth wing's response "too little too late" and called for the division to be reorganized, while Baudet continued to express his support for Jansen. Shortly after, Forum for Democracy announced that Jansen had given up his spot on the party list for the 2021 election.

After a number of prominent FvD members had left the party because of the controversy and Baudet had retained control over the party, a new party list for the 2021 general election was presented in late December. Jansen returned as the party's seventh candidate, and he was elected in March with 4,331 preference votes. Thierry Baudet and Theo Hiddema stated that they were among the people who had voted for Jansen.

=== House of Representatives ===
Jansen was sworn into the House of Representatives on 31 March 2021. In the House, his specialities are education, youth, climate, innovation, digital affairs, and defense, and he is on the Committees for Defense, for Digital Affairs, for Economic Affairs and Climate Policy, for Infrastructure and Water Management, for Kingdom Relations, for Public Expenditure, and for Social Affairs and Employment. Jansen stayed on as chair of the Forum for Democracy youth wing until September 2021, and he joined FvD's board as treasurer in November. He has advocated expanding the military, saying that spending on it should far exceed the NATO norm of 2% of GDP. Jansen was reprimanded in October 2022 by the House of Representatives for refusing to disclose his position as board member of publisher Amsterdam Media Group, while Baudet was suspended. The House's integrity body advised the following year to suspend Jansen along with Baudet and Van Meijeren for one week for omitting roles at a meal-kit delivery service on their disclosure forms.

In early 2022, Jansen declined a seat in the States of Overijssel, which was offered to him as there was a vacancy and he had been FvD's lijstduwer in the 2019 provincial elections. Jansen accepting the seat would have compelled him to relocate to the province. Jansen received a second term in the House after he was re-elected in 2023 as Forum for Democracy's second candidate. He temporarily stepped down on 16 January 2024 to make room for Pepijn van Houwelingen to serve on the body. NOS reported that such a temporary switch unrelated to health reasons had not occurred in the House since 1977. Although the replacement was intended to last six months, Van Houwelingen stayed on as a member of parliament. Jansen was Forum for Democracy's second candidate in the June 2024 European Parliament election, but the party did not secure any seats.

He was again elected to the House in 2025, but he resigned on 12 May 2026 following the birth of his child.

== Political views ==
In speeches, Jansen has complained about a moral weakening of Western civilization. He has said that people have become slaves of a financial system based on debt, that society suffers from consumerism and social isolation, and that mass immigration is causing the replacement of the population by people who do not share Western culture. Jansen has called immigration an "insane demographic experiment", of which young people will experience the consequences. During a debate in the House of Representatives, he decried the (by his own count) four million immigrants who had entered the Netherlands after World War II. Jansen said that without them the Netherlands would not be suffering from crime, street disturbances, a housing shortage, and overcrowded classrooms and hospitals (the latter during the COVID-19 pandemic). Furthermore, he said that "there would be conviviality and trust", that "you would not have to look over your shoulder while using an ATM", and that "girls could walk alone on the streets carefree". Earlier, he had also stated that children are being raised as slaves, unable to say what they think and unable to fight for what they care about because of political correctness.

Jansen has said that civilization must be saved from its downfall and that there is a choice between going under and fighting for a renaissance. He believes this latter option requires a community stronger in unity with an urge to dominate. Trouw reported that Jansen has used references to the alt-right.

== Personal life ==
While in parliament, Jansen moved from The Hague to Amsterdam.

== Electoral history ==
Electoral history of Freek Jansen
| Year | Body | Party | Pos. | Votes | Result | | Ref. |
| Year | Body | Party | Pos. | Votes | Party seats | Individual | Ref. |
|---|---|---|---|---|---|---|---|
| 2021 | House of Representatives | Forum for Democracy | 7 | 4,331 | 8 | Won | |
| 2023 | House of Representatives | Forum for Democracy | 2 | 3,456 | 3 | Won | |
| 2024 | European Parliament | Forum for Democracy | 2 | 2,954 | 0 | Lost | |
| 2025 | House of Representatives | Forum for Democracy | 4 | 800 | 7 | Won | |
| 2026 | Amsterdam Municipal Council | Forum for Democracy | 24 (Note: Jansen participated as a lijstduwer.) | 91 | 1 | Lost | |
