= Ralf Dekker =

Dutch politician (born 1957)

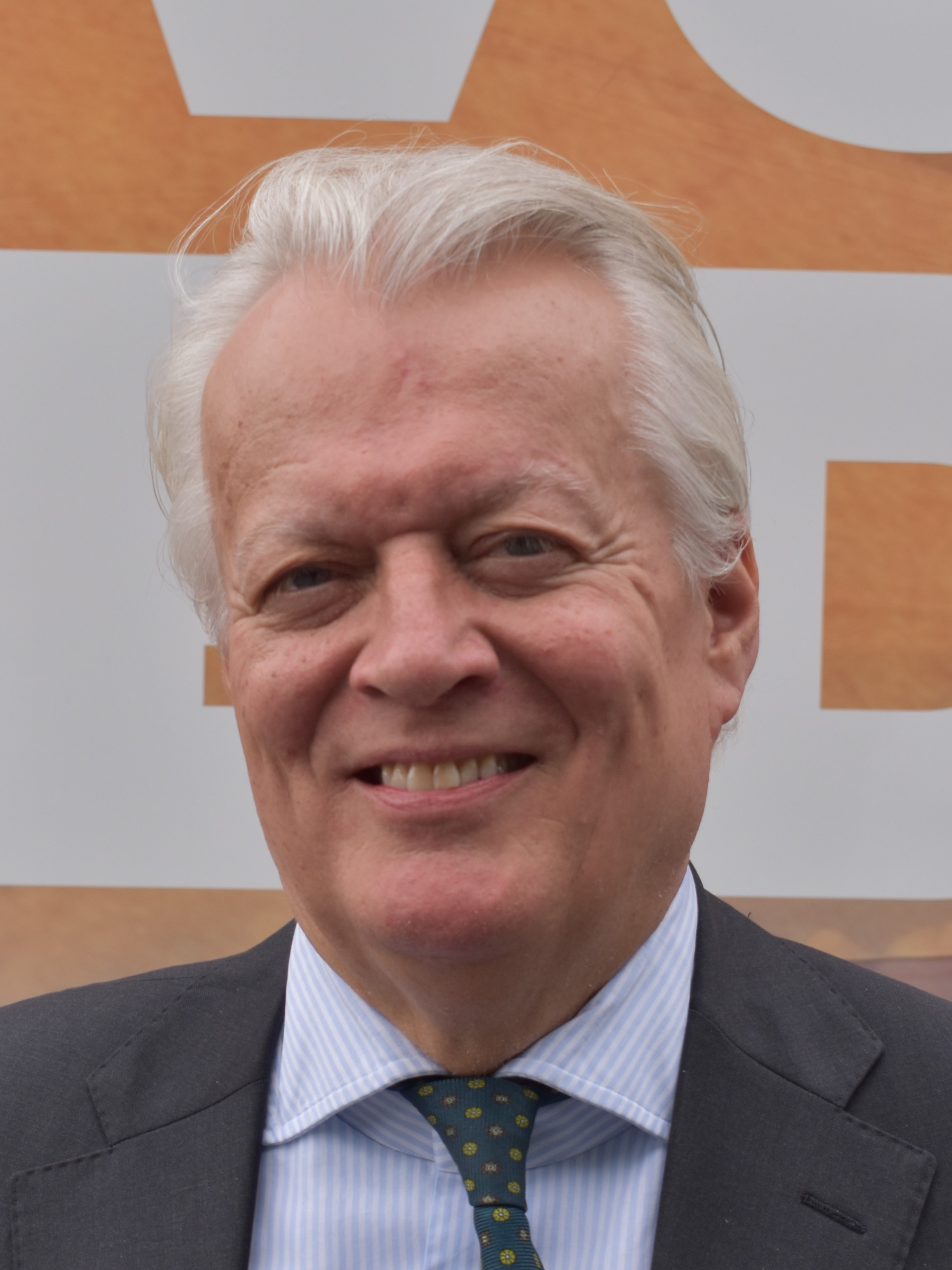
- Dekker in 2024

Member of the House of Representatives
- Incumbent
- Assumed office 19 November 2024
- Preceded by: Pepijn van Houwelingen
- In office 23 August 2022 – 27 March 2023
- Preceded by: Simone Kerseboom
- Succeeded by: Simone Kerseboom

Member of the Provincial Council of North Holland
- Incumbent
- Assumed office 28 March 2019

Personal details
- Born: Roelof Jan Dekker; 18 February 1957 (age 69) Utrecht, Netherlands
- Party: Forum for Democracy
- Children: 5
- Education: Leiden University; Utrecht University
- Occupation: Politician; banker

Roelof Jan "Ralf" Dekker (Dutch: [ˈrɑl(ə)f ˈdɛkər]; born 18 February 1957) is a Dutch banker and politician of the far-right party Forum for Democracy (FvD). Following his career at Rabobank, he has served on the Provincial Council of North Holland since March 2019 and in the House of Representatives since November 2024, having had a prior term from August 2022 to March 2023. He became chair of the Renaissance Institute, FvD's think tank, in 2022.

== Early life and career ==
Dekker was born in 1957 in Utrecht. He studied geology at Leiden University for three years, followed by business administration at Utrecht University. He worked in consultancy and automation before joining Rabobank in 1992. He was an executive board member between 2013 and 2017, and he left the bank afterwards. Dekker has been on the board of De Groene Rekenkamer (2011–12) and on the supervisory boards of DLL Group (2017–18) and Philip Morris Netherlands (until 2021).

He became a member of Forum for Democracy (FvD) in May 2018, nearly two years after its founding, and he was elected to the Provincial Council of North Holland in March 2019. Dekker ran for the House of Representatives in March 2021 as FvD's ninth candidate, and he was not elected as the party won eight seats. Between 23 August 2022 and 27 March 2023, he replaced Simone Kerseboom as a member of parliament during her maternity leave. He became chair of the Renaissance Institute, FvD's think tank, in 2022, and he was one of the initiators of Renaissance Scholen, a proposed network of schools inspired by the party's ideology.

He lost his bid for re-election to the Provincial Council of North Holland, but he remained a member due to Thierry Baudet declining his seat. He was FvD's fifth candidate in the November 2023 general election and its lead candidate in the June 2024 European Parliament election, but he was elected to neither. Dekker was again sworn into the House of Representatives on 19 November 2024, replacing Pepijn van Houwelingen, who stepped down to take care of his pregnant wife. Van Houwelingen's return is planned for March 2025.

== Personal life ==
As of 2024, Dekker lived in Amsterdam. He has five children, three of whom are from a previous relationship.

== Electoral history ==
Electoral history of Ralf Dekker
Year	Body	Party	Pos.	Votes	Result		Ref.
Year	Body	Party	Pos.	Votes	Party seats	Individual	Ref.
2019	Provincial Council of North Holland	Forum for Democracy	5	1,549	9	Won	
2021	House of Representatives	Forum for Democracy	9	536	8	Lost (Note: Dekker was appointed to the body later during the term due to a vacancy.)	
2022	Amsterdam Municipal Council	Forum for Democracy	19	18	1	Lost	
2023	Provincial Council of North Holland	Forum for Democracy	2	4,905	2	Lost (Note: Dekker was not elected despite his party's result due to other candidates meeting the threshold for preference votes. However, he did become a member of the body as Thierry Baudet declined his seat.)	
2023	Provincial Council of Utrecht	Forum for Democracy	15 (Note: Dekker participated as a lijstduwer.)	762	1	Lost	
2023	House of Representatives	Forum for Democracy	5	4,144	3	Lost	
2024	European Parliament	Forum for Democracy	1	111,052	0	Lost	
2025	House of Representatives	Forum for Democracy	5	1,462	7	Won	
2026	Amsterdam Municipal Council	Forum for Democracy	23	189	1	Lost	
