= Oikofobie =

2013 Dutch book by Thierry Baudet

Oikophobia: The Fear of Home
- First Dutch edition cover
- Author: Thierry Baudet
- Original title: Oikofobie: De angst voor het eigene
- Language: Dutch
- Publisher: Prometheus; Bert Bakker
- Publication date: 2013
- Publication place: Netherlands
- ISBN: 9789035140004

Oikofobie: De angst voor het eigene (Oikophobia. The fear of home) is a 2013 Dutch book written by Thierry Baudet.

In the book Baudet follows Roger Scruton's criticism of cultural relativism and multiculturalism. Baudet uses the word Oikophobia and explains this as a term that stands for a type of self hate of the (left) elite towards their own traditional culture. According to Baudet this becomes visible in the society in the dominant preference for open borders within Europe, modern art, multiculturalism. The book forms, together with Baudets other book Aanval op de natiestaat, the foundation for his political program of his political party Forum voor Democratie.

Reviews about the book have appeared in De Groene Amsterdammer, Joop (VARA), Vlaams Belang, Trouw, Vrij Nederland, Nederlandse Publieke Omroep Kunststof, Propria Cures, De Dagelijkse Standaard.

== Criticism ==
Several thinkers have strongly criticized Baudet's thinking. Sociologist Jan Willem Duyvendak claims the exact opposite in fact regarding the political elite who is focused Dutch people on "feeling at home", which was part of the Amsterdam political plans. The opening of the Nationaal Historisch Museum and the integration policies for immigrants are focused on adapting to the Dutch identity instead of assimilation of both immigrants as well as Dutch people. Duyvendak speaks of oikophily or oikomania instead. According to cultural philosopher Thijs Lijster, Baudet is making a fallacy by mixing the public space, the city and the house as one thing. The rules inside the house differ from the ones in the city and the public space. This results in the distinction to regard certain groups of people as "guests" instead of legal civilians. Musicologist Yuri Landman explains Baudet creates a paradox by stating modern art (and atonal music) are inferior in quality compared to pre-1900 art and music, while he also states that the Western culture is superior above any other culture and should be protected to what Baudet has called "the homeopathic dilution of our culture" by immigrants with a different cultural background. If everything after 1900 is inferior, the contemporary Western culture can not be superior. Also Landman warns Baudet for approaching the concept of degenerate art with his conservative criticism.

== Publication ==
- Oikofobie, de angst voor het eigene. (2013) Amsterdam: Prometheus/Bert Bakker, ISBN 9789035140004
