= Lidewij de Vos =

Dutch politician (born 1997)

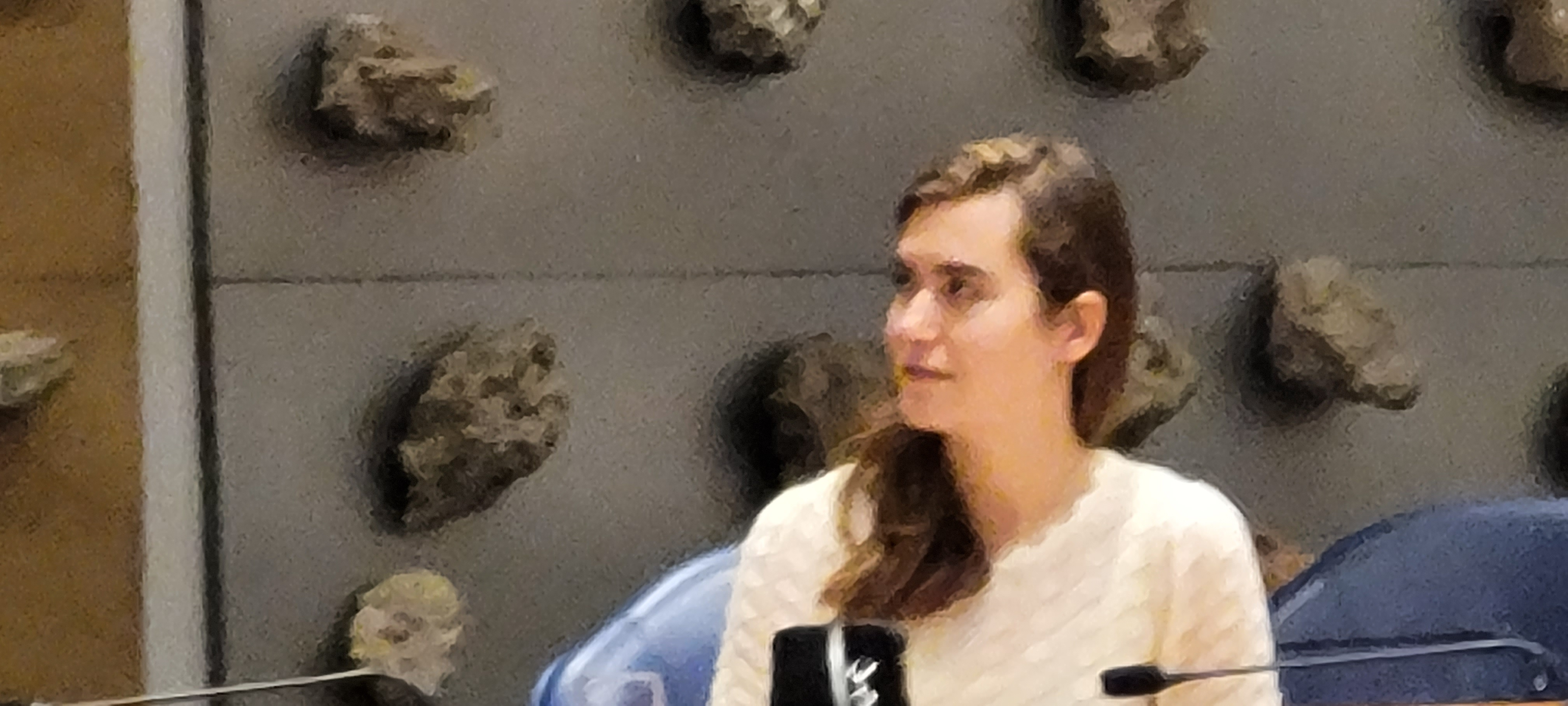
- De Vos in 2024

Leader of Forum for Democracy in the House of Representatives
- In office 4 September 2025 – 6 August 2026
- Preceded by: Thierry Baudet
- Succeeded by: Ralf Dekker

Member of the House of Representatives
- In office 4 September 2025 – 6 August 2026
- Preceded by: Pepijn van Houwelingen
- Succeeded by: Iem al Biyati
- In office 16 January 2025 – 31 March 2025
- Preceded by: Thierry Baudet
- Succeeded by: Thierry Baudet

Personal details
- Born: Lidewij Guinevere de Vos; 30 August 1997 (age 29) Leidschendam, Netherlands
- Party: FvD
- Education: Utrecht University; Erasmus University Rotterdam
- Occupation: Politician; musician

Lidewij Guinevere de Vos (Dutch: [ˈlidəʋɛi də ˈvɔs]; born 30 August 1997) is a Dutch politician of the far-right Forum for Democracy (FvD).

== Biography ==
=== Early life and career ===
De Vos was born in 1997 in Leidschendam, and she studied biochemistry at Utrecht University and neuroscience at Erasmus University Rotterdam. She was trained to play the violin, and she worked as a violin teacher in Utrecht from 2017 to 2019.

=== Political career ===
De Vos was a volunteer for the Jongerenorganisatie Forum voor Democratie, the youth-wing of the FvD. She later became a policy advisor for Forum for Democracy in August 2021. In 2023, she and party leader Thierry Baudet co-authored the book Nobody in the Cockpit which describes the state of government in the Netherlands, according to the authors. De Vos ran for the House of Representatives in November 2023 as the party's sixth candidate, but she was not elected since the party secured three seats. She was sworn into the House on 16 January 2025 to temporarily replace party leader Thierry Baudet, who stepped down to go on paternity leave. Baudet returned on 1 April 2025.

De Vos was the lead candidate of Forum for Democracy in the October 2025 general election. On 4 September 2025, following the announcement, she returned to the House, replacing Pepijn van Houwelingen. She succeeded Baudet as parliamentary leader. Her selection as FvD leader was seen as a move to improve and clean the party's image and regain votes. However, research by Dutch newspaper NRC suggested that De Vos had worked closely with members of the party's youth-wing who had made "racist, anti-Semitic and terror-glorifying statements" and claimed she was partly involved in promoting controversial members of the youth-wing to important positions. De Volkskrant noted the "Lidewij effect" where the FvD was able to achieve a better result in the 2025 Dutch general election under her leadership despite its policy content remaining the same. The party saw seven MPs elected in the election.

=== House committee assignments ===
- Committee for Climate Policy and Green Growth

== Personal life ==
As of 2024, De Vos resided in The Hague.

== Electoral history ==
Electoral history of Ralf Dekker
Year	Body	Party	Pos.	Votes	Result		Ref.
Year	Body	Party	Pos.	Votes	Party seats	Individual	Ref.
2022	The Hague Municipal Council	Forum for Democracy	4	41	1	Lost	
2023	House of Representatives	Forum for Democracy	6	2,200	3	Lost (Note: De Vos was appointed to the body later during the term due to a vacancy.)	
2025	House of Representatives	Forum for Democracy	1	427,882	7	Won	
