= Biaudet =

Biaudet is a Finnish surname. Notable people with the surname include:

- Eva Biaudet (born 1961), Finnish politician
- Rudi Biaudet (born 1953), Finnish sailor
- Ulla Bjerne-Biaudet (1890–1969), Swedish-Finnish author

== See also ==
- Baudet
