= Milan Schenk =

Dutch politician (born 2000)

Member of the House of Representatives
- Incumbent
- Assumed office 19 May 2026
- Preceded by: Freek Jansen

Personal details
- Born: 2000 (age 25–26)
- Party: Forum for Democracy (since 2022)
- Other political affiliations: Schenk List (2022)

Milan Schenk (born 2000) is a Dutch politician serving as a member of the House of Representatives since 2026. He has been a municipal councillor of Teylingen since 2022.
