= Lennart van der Linden =

Dutch politician (born 1983)

Member of the Senate of the Netherlands
- Incumbent
- Assumed office 2019

Alderman of Barendrecht
- In office 2014–2018

Personal details
- Born: 4 November 1983 (age 42) Rotterdam, Netherlands
- Party: JA21
- Other political affiliations: Echt voor Barendrecht (2014–); Forum for Democracy (2018–2020)

Lennart van der Linden (born 4 November 1983) is a Dutch politician and a member of the Senate of the Netherlands.

Van der Linden was the Alderman of Barendrecht for the localist Echt voor Barendrecht (Really for Barendrecht) political party and served in this role until 2018. He became installed as a Senator for the Forum for Democracy party in 2019. He subsequently served as vice-chairman of the FvD Senate faction and was a member of the party's executive board. He became acting chairman of the party after Thierry Baudet temporarily stood down following several controversies and allegations. Following an internal referendum in the party which saw Baudet return as FvD leader, Van der Linden announced he would step down from the FvD's board and reconsider his future in the party. In 2020, he resigned from the FvD to sit as an independent before joining JA21 founded by ex-FvD members.
