= Peter van Duijvenvoorde =

Dutch politician (born 1988)

Member of the House of Representatives
- Incumbent
- Assumed office 12 November 2025

Personal details
- Born: 5 August 1988 (age 37) Leiden, Netherlands
- Party: Forum for Democracy

Peter van Duijvenvoorde (born 5 August 1988) is a Dutch politician for Forum for Democracy (FvD). In the 2025 general election, he was seventh on the candidate list for the House of Representatives election and thus elected. He is director of the Renaissance Institute and chairman of the Tocqueville Foundation.
