= Tom Russcher =

Dutch politician (born 1992)

Member of the House of Representatives
- Incumbent
- Assumed office 15 January 2026
- Preceded by: Thierry Baudet

Personal details
- Born: Tom Kristian Russcher; 11 December 1992 Soest, Netherlands
- Party: Forum for Democracy
- Education: Amsterdam University of Applied Sciences (BA)

Tom Kristian Russcher (born 11 December 1992) is a Dutch politician of the far-right Forum for Democracy (FvD) party, who has been serving as a member of the House of Representatives since January 2026.

== Early life and career ==
He was born on 11 December 1992 in Soest, and he studied commercial economics at Amsterdam University of Applied Sciences, graduating with a Bachelor of Arts degree in 2017. After some roles in the private sector, he became a policy officer of the FvD's parliamentary group in the House in 2019. He simultaneously served as the party's national spokesperson starting in 2022. A resident of Harderwijk, Russcher was the eighth candidate on the FvD's party list in the October 2025 general election, and he succeeded party founder Thierry Baudet in the House on 15 January 2026, following his stepping down.
