= Johan Dessing =

Dutch politician (born 1965)

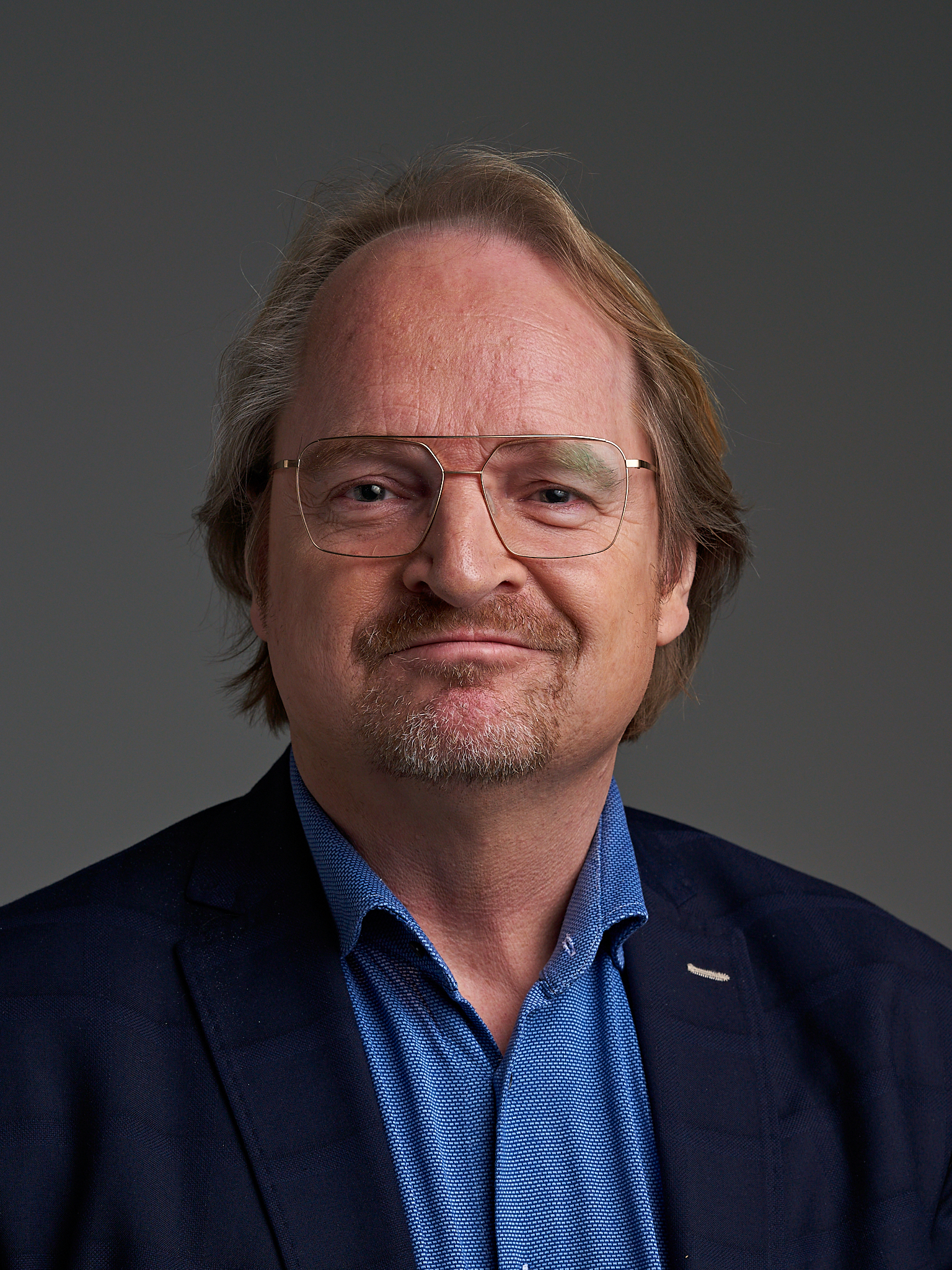

Member of the States of North Holland
- Incumbent
- Assumed office 28 March 2019

Member of the Senate
- Incumbent
- Assumed office 11 June 2019

Parliamentary leader of Forum for Democracy
- Incumbent
- Assumed office 31 March 2022

Personal details
- Born: 1965 (age 60–61) Amsterdam, Netherlands
- Party: Forum for Democracy

Johan Dessing (born 1965) is a Dutch politician and a member of the Senate for the Forum for Democracy party.

Before entering politics, Dessing was an air traffic controller at Amsterdam Schiphol Airport. Dessing has been a member of the Provincial Council in North-Holland since 28 March 2019 and the party leader of the FvD in the province. On 11 June 2019, he was also installed as a senator in the Senate. Since March 2022, he has been the party's only senator and is therefore parliamentary leader. He is the brother of Dutch television presenter Floortje Dessing.

== Electoral history ==
Electoral history of Johan Dessing
Year	Body	Party	Pos.	Votes	Result		Ref.
Year	Body	Party	Pos.	Votes	Party seats	Individual	Ref.
2021	House of Representatives	Forum for Democracy	42	84	8	Lost	
2023	Senate	Forum for Democracy	1		2	Won	
2023	House of Representatives	Forum for Democracy	10	162	3	Lost	
2024	European Parliament	Forum for Democracy	7	290	0	Lost	
2025	House of Representatives	Forum for Democracy	42	21	7	Lost	
2026	Amsterdam Municipal Council	Forum for Democracy	1	6,587	1	Won	
