= Jongerenorganisatie Forum voor Democratie =

Youth wing of a political organisation in the Netherlands

Forum for Democracy Youth Organisation Jongerenorganisatie Forum voor Democratie (JFVD)
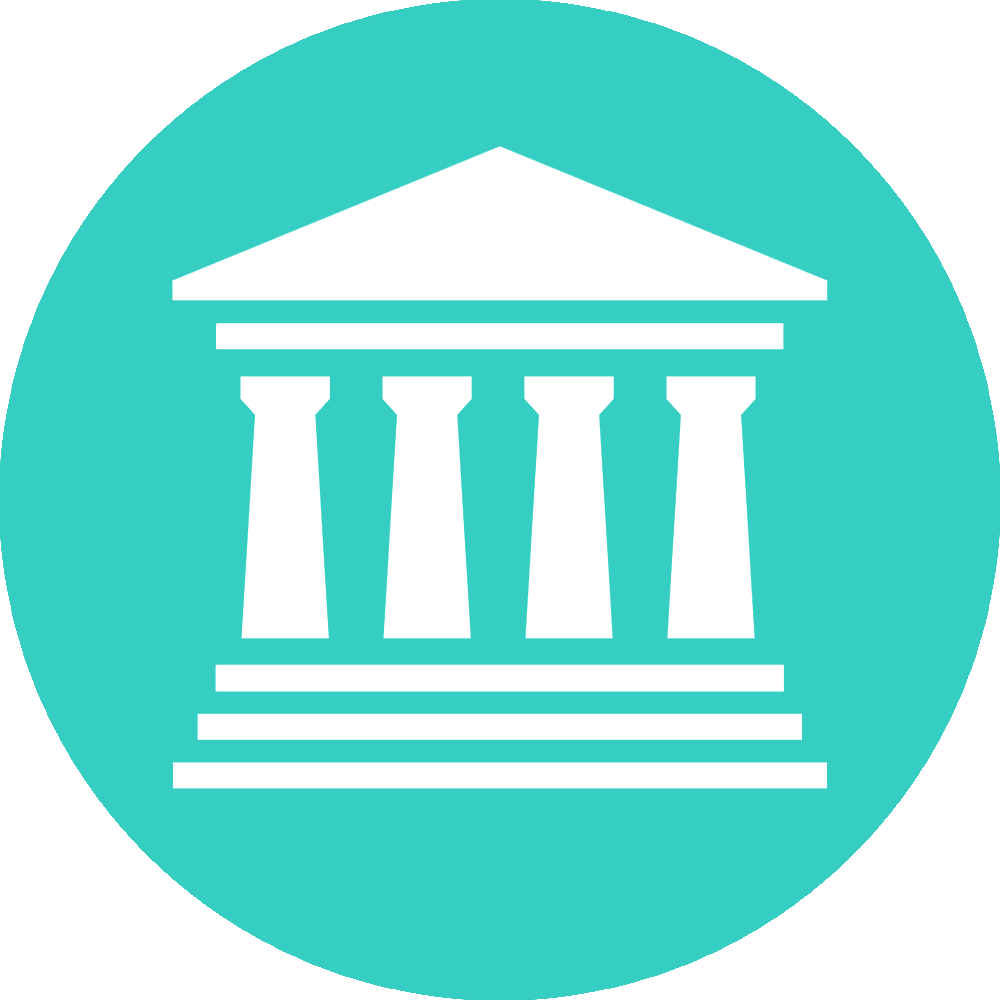
- President: Robbert van der Meijden
- Founded: 2017
- Headquarters: Herengracht 74, Amsterdam
- Ideology: National conservatism Right-wing populism Euroscepticism
- Position: Far-right
- Mother party: Forum for Democracy
- International affiliation: European Young Conservatives
- Website: www.jongerenfvd.nl

Jongerenorganisatie Forum voor Democratie (JFVD; English: Forum for Democracy Youth Organisation) is a political youth organisation in the Netherlands that acts as the youth wing of the Forum for Democracy party.

== Organization ==
JFVD is aimed at people between the ages of 14 and 31. It has a national board with five members and a regional hub for each Dutch province controlled by one member of the national board with at least two coordinators working with them. These hubs organise events such as summer camps for members, debates, and lectures. The membership was claimed to stand at around 4498 in 2021. The JFVD was originally founded and chaired by Freek Jansen. He was subsequently succeeded by Iem al Biyati. The youth wing publishes a magazine called De Dissident.

== Controversies ==
In April 2021, the JFVD was investigated by the mother party after Dutch magazine HP/De Tijd published instances of members sharing messages in WhatsApp groups that were deemed to have extremist and racist content (including praise of Anders Breivik and Brenton Tarrant). In response, then FVD Senator and vice-chairman Lennart van der Linden described the messages as "disgusting" but added "we do not want to be a thought police for things that people do in private" and that one of the people involved was not a member of the party. The FVD subsequently discharged three members as a result of the incident.

In November 2021, Het Parool revealed more instances of remarks deemed racist, homophobic and antisemitic made by members and alleged that the JFVD chair and parliamentary candidate Freek Jansen had appointed individuals who had made controversial statements into coordinating positions of the youth wing. Jansen responded to the allegations by saying that the youth wing had no place for "racist and antisemitic ideas". However, the controversies led to calls from some FVD politicians for the youth wing to be disbanded and were cited as a reason by some FVD MEPs and Senators for quitting the party over what they felt was a slow and inadequate response to the incidents.
