= Eric Kemperman =

Member of the Senate
- Incumbent
- Assumed office 13 June 2023

Member of the Provincial Council of Gelderland
- Incumbent
- Assumed office 15 March 2023

Personal details
- Born: 23 October 1964 (age 61) Rotterdam, Netherlands
- Party: FvD (since 2025)
- Other political affiliations: BBB (until 2025)
- Children: 2
- Education: Nyenrode Business University; Erasmus University Rotterdam
- Occupation: Businessman • Politician

Eric Kemperman (born 23 October 1964) is a Dutch businessman and politician. Since 2023, he has been a member of the Gelderland Provincial Council and of the Senate of the Netherlands.

== Career ==
Kemperman completed several business courses at Nyenrode Business University and the Erasmus University Rotterdam and worked as a manager at various organisations. He first became active in politics as a member of the Farmer-Citizen Movement (BBB) and was elected to the Provincial Council of Gelderland in during the 2023 Dutch provincial elections. He left the party on the 19 May 2025 taking his seats with him. Since September 2025 he has been a member of the Forum for Democracy.
