= Jacques Baudet-Lafarge =

French politician

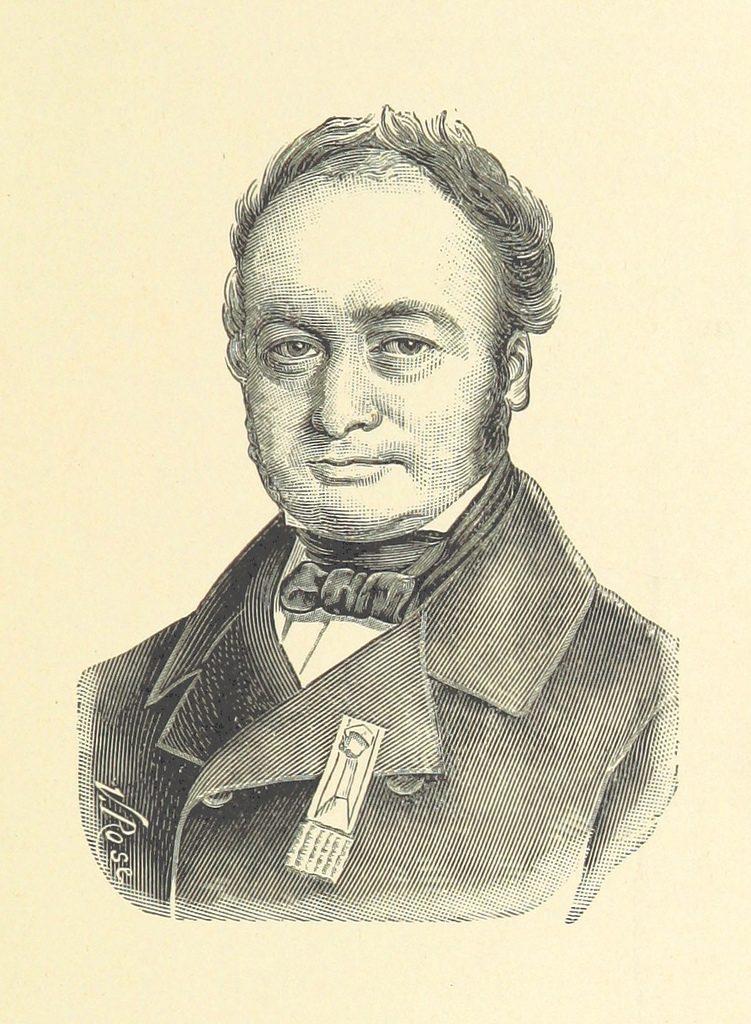
- Born: 28 January 1803; Maringues, Puy-de-Dôme, France
- Died: 11 August 1867 (aged 64); Riom, Puy-de-Dôme, France
- Occupation: Politician
- Parent: Mathieu Baudet-Lafarge

Jacques Baudet-Lafarge (1803–1867) was a French politician. He served as a member of the National Assembly from 1848 to 1849, representing Puy-de-Dôme.
