= Iem al Biyati =

Dutch politician (born 1998)

Member of the House of Representatives
- Incumbent
- Assumed office 1 September 2026
- Preceded by: Lidewij de Vos

Personal details
- Born: 12 July 1998 (age 28)
- Party: Forum for Democracy

Iem al Biyati (born 12 July 1998) is a Dutch politician serving as a member of the House of Representatives since 2026. From 2021 to 2026, she served as chairwoman of the Jongerenorganisatie Forum voor Democratie.
