= Gideon van Meijeren =

Member of the Dutch House of Representatives

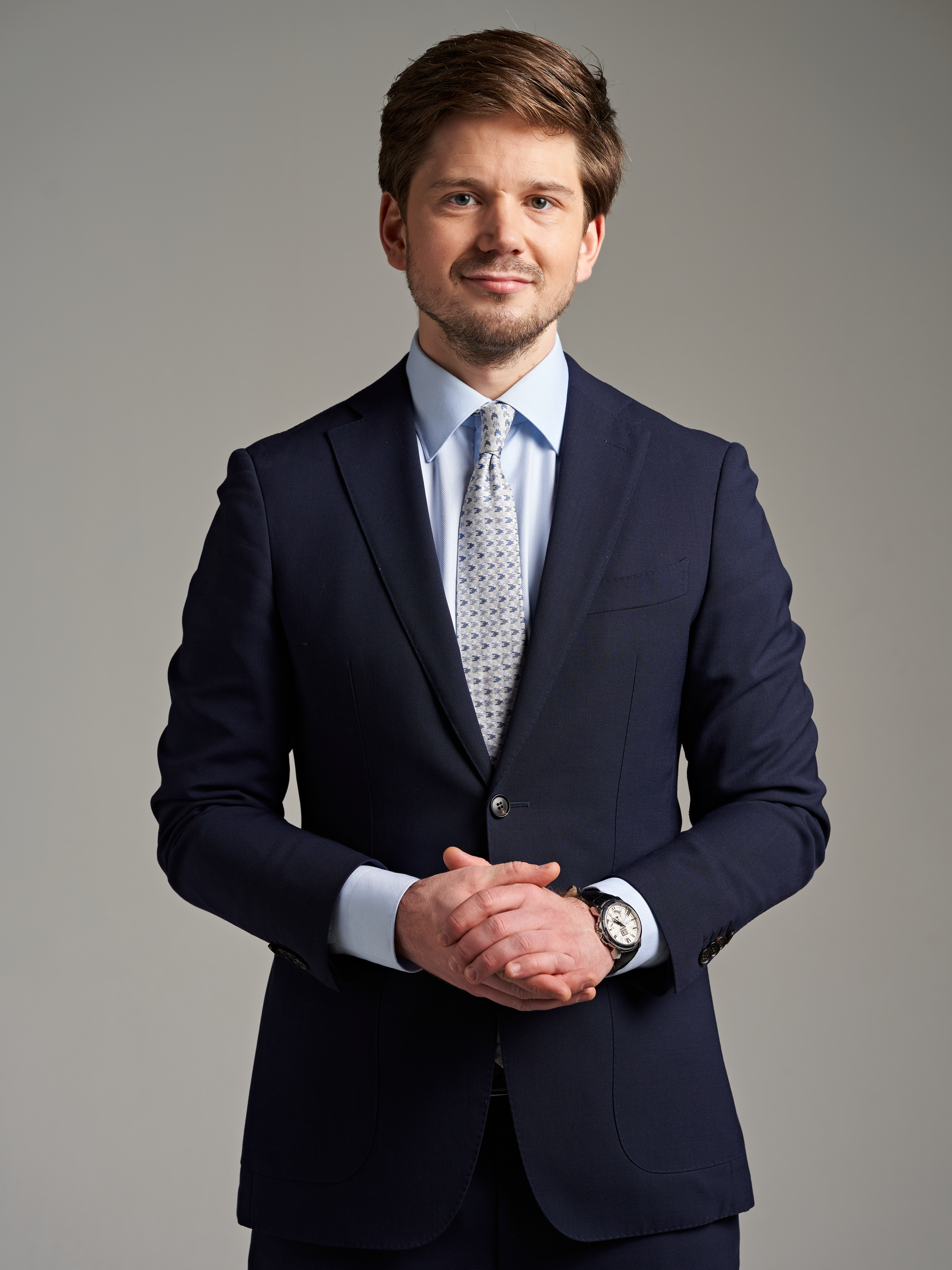
- Van Meijeren (2021)

Member of the House of Representatives
- Incumbent
- Assumed office 31 March 2021

Member of the States of South Holland
- In office 28 March 2019 – 28 March 2023

Member of the municipal council of The Hague
- Incumbent
- Assumed office 30 March 2022

Personal details
- Born: Gideon Frederik Cornelis van Meijeren; 27 May 1988 (age 38) Doetinchem, Netherlands
- Party: Forum for Democracy
- Education: Radboud University
- Occupation: Politician; civil servant

Gideon Frederik Cornelis van Meijeren (born 27 May 1988) is a Dutch civil servant and politician, who has represented Forum for Democracy (FVD) in the House of Representatives since the 2021 general election. He also held a seat in the States of South Holland and was elected to the municipal council of The Hague in 2022. He previously worked as a legislative adviser for the government. His opposition to the government's policy to mitigate the COVID-19 pandemic and his statements regarding democracy – including speculation about an overthrow of the government – have drawn stark criticism from political leaders. In June 2024, Van Meijeren was sentenced by the District Court of The Hague to 200 hours of community service for incitement to violence for utterances in past speeches and interviews, but the The Hague Court of Appeal acquitted him on appeal in March 2026.

== Early life and career ==
Van Meijeren was born and raised in the Achterhoek city of Doetinchem. He has two siblings and is the middle child. Van Meijeren attended the secondary school Ulenhofcollege between 2000 and 2006 at havo level. He then studied law at the Juridische Hogeschool in Tilburg, receiving his propedeuse in 2007, and followed a short officer training at the Royal Military Academy in Breda until 2008. Van Meijeren worked for 3.5 years as an IT employee for the Royal Netherlands Army.

He returned to college studying law in the years 2011–15 at Radboud University Nijmegen, and subsequently found a job as a legislative adviser at the Ministry of the Interior and Kingdom Relations. He filled that same position starting in 2017 at the legislative office of the House of Representatives, offering legislative advice to any political party.

== Local and regional politics ==
Van Meijeren joined Forum for Democracy when it became a political party in 2016, and he became active within the party, having been unable to practice his political convictions in his job. He started working as a legal assistant of Forum for Democracy's House caucus in November 2018. He was elected to the States of South Holland as FVD's fifth candidate in the 2019 provincial elections, and he became the party's spokesperson for climate and reactive nitrogen in that legislative chamber. He was also placed eighth on the party list in the European Parliament election two months later. In the provincial council, Van Meijeren unsuccessfully called for a referendum about the construction of wind turbines and solar farms, saying that South Holland's plans were anti-democratic. He also participated in a July 2020 Farmers Defence Force protest near the RIVM's headquarters in Bilthoven against a measure to limit reactive nitrogen emissions, which would affect farmers.

Following a November 2020 article by Het Parool about extremist thoughts of members of the FVD's youth wing, five out of the seven provincial councilors in the States of South Holland left the party. Van Meijeren continued to be a member of Forum for Democracy and became the leader of the South Holland caucus. A few months later, Elsevier Weekblad reported that Van Meijeren had replied "Hell no" in a WhatsApp group chat, after party leader Thierry Baudet had asked "Would you want your sister to come home with a negro?" Van Meijeren explained that it was an inside joke in a discussion about institutional racism, saying that his ex-girlfriend is Antillean and that his sister is married to a person of colour.

Van Meijeren decided to keep his seat in the States of South Holland when he was elected to the House of Representatives in 2021, but he stepped down as caucus leader. He was Forum for Democracy's lead candidate in The Hague in the March 2022 municipal elections, leading to his election to the municipal council. He was sworn in on 30 March. He was also the lijstduwer of his party in the same election in Doetinchem, in which his father, Lambert van Meijeren, a former Albert Heijn branch manager, was elected to the council as FVD's lead candidate. Van Meijeren was lijstduwer in South Holland in the March 2023 provincial elections. He raised doubts about the election results in advance, saying that those in power would be willing to go far to keep out rivals. Van Meijeren was re-elected to the States of South Holland due to his 10,177 preference votes, but he declined his seat. Forum for Democracy had won two seats in total. Near the end of his term, NOS and regional broadcasters featured Van Meijeren in an article about the most absent members of provincial councils. The article noted that Van Meijeren had been absent during 13 out of 30 meetings, making him the tenth most absent provincial council member in the country.

== House of Representatives ==
He joined the Forum for Democracy's board as secretary in January 2021 and was its sixth candidate in the 2021 general election. During the campaign, he said that he wanted to introduce a bill prohibiting censorship by social media companies and that he wanted the mayorship to be an elected office. He also told that he feared immigration, as it would make the Netherlands unrecognizable and would ruin the welfare state. He was elected to the House of Representatives with 602 preference votes, was installed on 31 March, and became FVD's spokesperson for justice, security, immigration, agriculture, nature, and the interior.

=== COVID-19 pandemic ===
He opposed lockdowns and measures to mitigate the COVID-19 pandemic in the Netherlands, saying that its implementers would be prosecuted and locked up for taking away freedoms. He later opposed the Dutch vaccination program against the disease. Van Meijeren's comments and actions in parliament related to the issue have sparked several controversies. In May 2021, he violated social distancing rules – in effect due to the COVID-19 pandemic – after the maiden speech of fellow member of parliament Simone Kerseboom, when he congratulated her by kissing and hugging her. When the House's integrity committee received complaints about the incident, Van Meijeren stated that he did not recognize the body's authority. In September, the Speaker of the House interrupted a debate contribution by Van Meijeren, when he drew a comparison between restrictions for people not vaccinated against COVID-19 and the persecution of the Jews during World War II. This occurred in a debate about violence and threats against journalists, in which Van Meijeren claimed that the mainstream media were spreading fake news and misinformation. Another two months later, after fellow member of parliament Nilüfer Gündoğan had complained in a debate about intimidating emails, Van Meijeren said that he was proud that his supporters were going all out to change her mind about the government's COVID-19 policy.

Van Meijeren was deprived of the floor by the Speaker in January 2022 for violating the ban on calls for lawlessness of the House's rules of procedure; he had advocated civil disobedience of COVID-19 restrictions after he had called them criminal and had expressed his distrust of the Dutch legal system. The Speaker had been criticized in the preceding days for not intervening enough. Van Meijeren subsequently argued during a debate about norms that freedom of speech has come under threat in the House of Representatives. In June 2022, over 300 scientists signed a letter, in which they decried attacks on the scientific community. The direct cause was Van Meijeren accusing infectionist Jaap van Dissel – noted for his work related to the COVID-19 pandemic – of corruption. A documentary called Gideon: Op zoek naar de waarheid (Gideon: In search of the truth), in which Van Meijeren investigates COVID-19 vaccinations from a critical point of view, was released by Docsfair in early 2022. The documentary's premier in Tuschinski Theatre was canceled as cinema chain Pathé found it inappropriate to show a film about him in a place that was founded by a Jew who was killed as part of the Holocaust given earlier comments by Van Meijeren.

=== Anti-government statements ===
While a House member, he told in an interview that he did not consider the Netherlands to be a democracy anymore, arguing that decisions are made in back rooms and that they cannot be changed by the parliament. Van Meijeren also criticized the mainstream media in the Netherlands. In October 2022, he made a video in which he approached a Hart van Nederland journalist to hold her accountable for a mistake and compared her to a sewer rat. The action was widely condemned by other politicians including Prime Minister Mark Rutte, who called it a "new low point", as well as by the Dutch Association of Journalists. Van Meijeren and his party have often expressed their belief – labeled by media as a conspiracy theory – that the government is working with the World Economic Forum (WEF), a non-governmental organization, to subjugate the population.

His comments during an interview with website Compleetdenkers in November again sparked criticism, including from the prime minister. Van Meijeren voiced his opinion that freedoms were being curtailed by the Dutch government and said that regimes exhibiting tyrannical behavior had been overthrown by the people before. He hoped that a revolution – during which people would march to the parliament building – would be peaceful but said this had often not been the case. His comments drew comparisons to the January 6 United States Capitol attack, which had occurred two years earlier. The Public Prosecution Service announced in September 2023 that it would prosecute Van Meijeren for incitement, focusing on his comments on Compleetdenkers as well as a speech at a July 2022 farmers' protest in Tuil. In the latter, he had told that "it is permissible to violently resist the government if it were to expropriate farmers". Van Meijeren stated that his prosecution appeared politically motivated. He was sentenced to 200 hours of community service by a court in The Hague in June 2024.

NRC wrote that Van Meijeren had become "one of the best-known FVD members due to his fierce statements." The article also noted that he often appears at anti-government demonstrations as well as in videos of the party.

=== Second term ===
He was re-elected in November 2023. When Thierry Baudet stepped down effective 13 January 2025 to go on paternity leave, Van Meijeren succeeded him as the FVD's parliamentary leader in the House.

=== Committee assignments ===
==== 2021–2023 term ====
- Committee for Agriculture, Nature and Food Quality
- Committee for the Interior
- Committee for Justice and Security
- Contact group Belgium

==== 2023–present term ====
- Committee for the Interior
- Committee for Justice and Security
- Temporary committee Fundamental rights and constitutional review
- Contact group Belgium
- Committee for Asylum and Migration
- Committee for Agriculture, Fisheries, Food Security and Nature

== Personal life ==
Van Meijeren moved to The Hague in 2015 after completing his studies in Nijmegen. He has a girlfriend called Carola, whom he had met during the campaign for the 2017 general election.

Media reported late 2022 that Van Meijeren had to appear in court after he had violated a driving disqualification the year before. Explaining the disqualification, he told that he noticed one of his car's wheels being loose upon leaving the garage of the House of Representatives. After he had pulled over, his driver's license was suspended after he had refused to take a breathalyzer test. According to Van Meijeren, he refused to take the test as a result of intimidating comments, including ones related to his political activities, by the police officers and a suspicion that he had been followed by the police for a while. Van Meijeren told he abstains from alcohol, but some media reports seemingly contradicted this. The police noticed in December 2021 that he had broken the driving ban, when they pulled him over for running a red light on a moped. Van Meijeren stated that he was unaware that the driving ban also applied to mopeds. For his violation, he was ordered in March 2023 to serve 60 hours of community service, and he received a one-week suspended prison sentence. The proceedings revealed that Van Meijeren had twice before been caught driving under influence in the period 2010–11.

== Electoral history ==
Electoral history of Gideon van Meijeren
Year	Body	Party	Pos.	Votes	Result		Ref.
Year	Body	Party	Pos.	Votes	Party seats	Individual	Ref.
2021	House of Representatives	Forum for Democracy	6	602	8	Won	
2023	House of Representatives	Forum for Democracy	3	45,361	3	Won	
2024	European Parliament	Forum for Democracy	30 (Note: Van Meijeren participated as a lijstduwer.)	5,743	0	Lost	
2025	House of Representatives	Forum for Democracy	3	18,870	7	Won	
2026	Doetinchem Municipal Council	Forum for Democracy	10	236	4	Won (Note: Van Meijeren received enough preference votes to be elected despite his party's result. However, he declined his seat.)	
