= Mathieu Baudet-Lafarge =

French politician

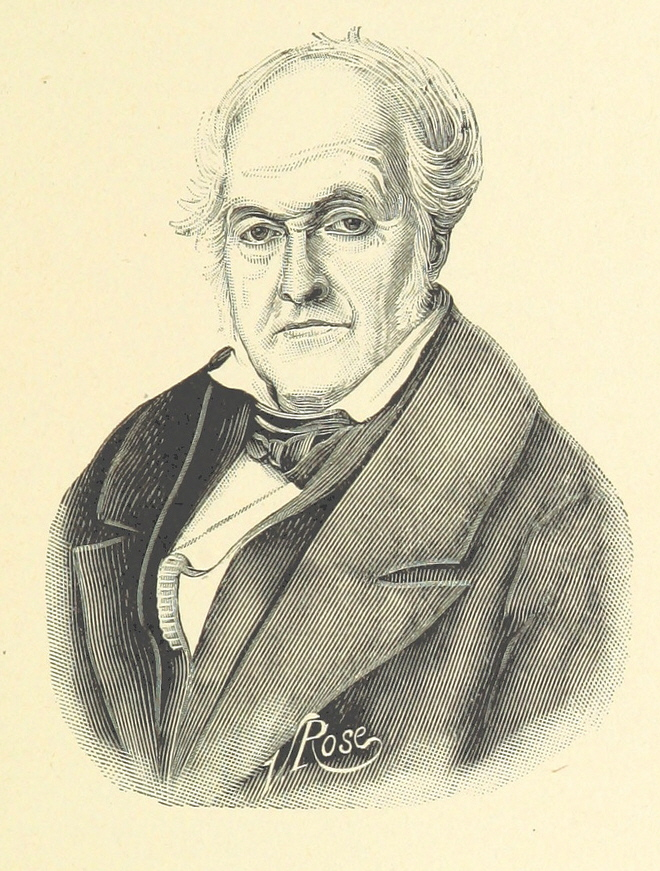
- Born: 8 November 1765; Maringues, Auvergne (province), France
- Died: 2 May 1837 (aged 71); Maringues, Puy-de-Dôme, France
- Occupation: Politician
- Children: Jacques Baudet-Lafarge

Mathieu Baudet-Lafarge (1765–1837) was a French politician. He served as a member of the Council of Five Hundred from 1898 to 1899, and as a member of the Chamber of Deputies from 1830 to 1833, representing Puy-de-Dôme.
