= Lijstduwer =

Dutch political term

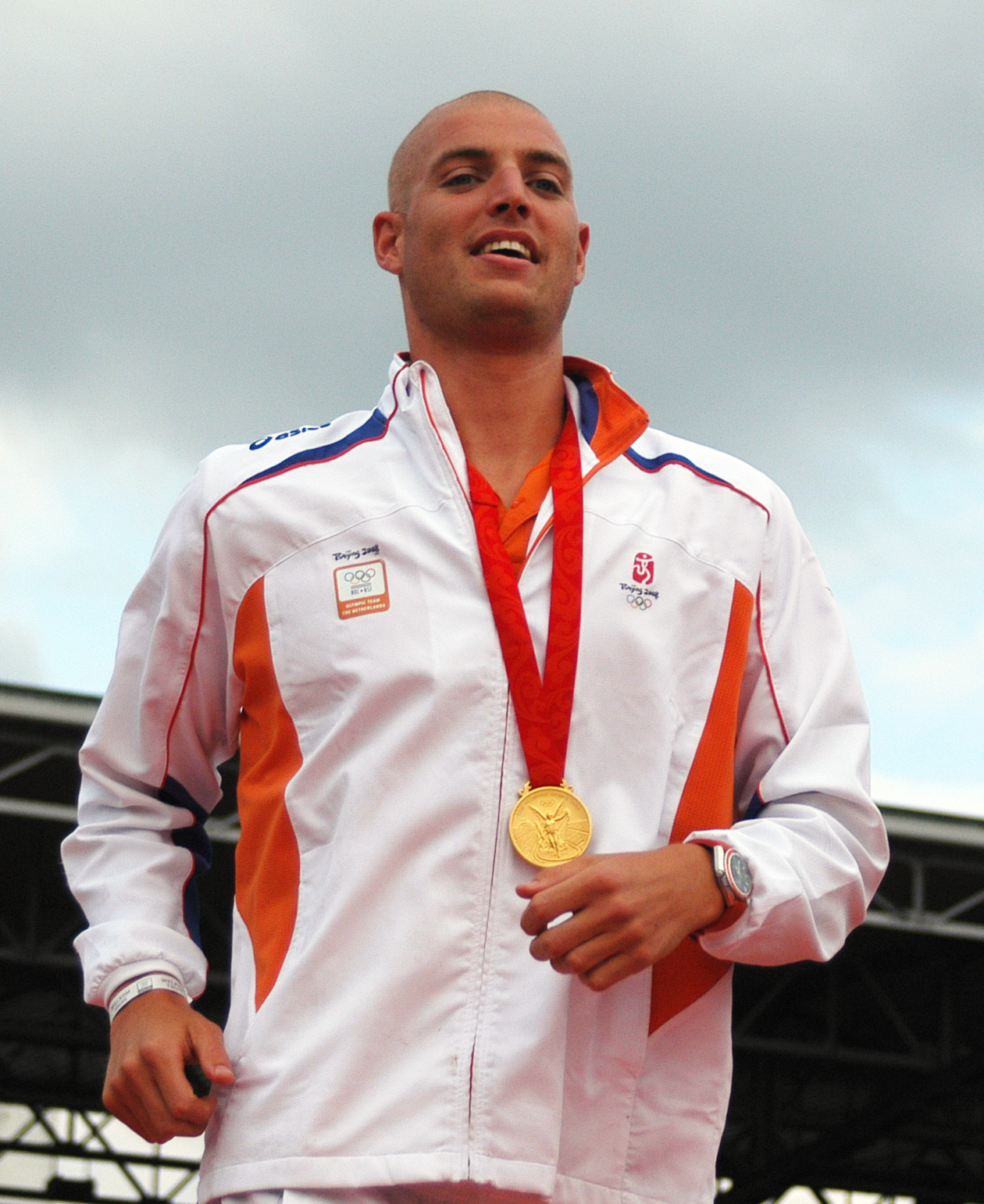
Dutch professional swimmer Maarten van der Weijden was chosen as the lijstduwer for the VVD in the 2017, 2021 and 2023 elections.

Lijstduwer (Dutch pronunciation: [ˈlɛizˌdyu.ər]; 'list pusher') is a Dutch term for the last candidate on a party list.

In Suriname, the Netherlands and Belgium, this position is often taken by well-known non-politicians such as artists, celebrities and sportspeople. They are official candidates, but they are put at the end of the party list. Since this is generally an unelectable position, accepting nomination as a lijstduwer is considered to be an endorsement of that specific party with the intent of attracting more votes for the party on account of their reputation and popularity in their field, while precluding any concerns regarding such nominal candidates' competence as lawmakers. In local elections, ordinary people who are well-known in the community might also act as lijstduwer.

Given that these electoral systems use open list party-list proportional representation, votes cast to the lijstduwer add up to the total number of votes, and hence seats for the party. The candidate is not likely to become a member of the elected body due to the low placement on the list, and generally rejects the position if they gather enough preference votes for a full seat (which they can claim under the Dutch system). There can be more than one lijstduwer. How many members on the list can be considered lijstduwer varies. In the broader definition, candidates who are lower on the list than the number of seats a party is likely to win, are considered lijstduwers.

In Israel, which uses a closed list nationwide proportional representation system, the tradition of choosing elder statesmen and celebrities as candidates in the lowest places of the list also exists, but without a special term.

As some local elections in Germany have cumulative voting and panachage the last place on the party list is sometimes given to a more prominent or high-profile candidate for similar reasons to the phenomenon in the Netherlands.

In Spain, most national constituencies are small enough that the last candidate in the list has a decent chance of being elected, either directly or as a replacement in case the main candidate resigns mid-term. But in the biggest constituencies, such as Madrid or Barcelona, where there are so many seats that no single party will reasonably fill them all up, or in local and regional elections, which are often conducted with a single list of dozens or even over a hundred candidates, this practice is sometimes used to attract attention. For instance, football coach Pep Guardiola acted as the closing candidate for the pro-independence party Junts pel Sí in the Barcelona constituency list for the 2015 Catalan regional election

Well-known national politicians can act as lijstduwer on the list for the European and municipal elections.

== Notable lijstduwers in Dutch general elections ==
- People's Party for Freedom and Democracy: Maarten van der Weijden
- Labour Party: Foppe de Haan
- Christian Democratic Appeal: Wiljan Vloet
- GroenLinks: Ineke van Gent
- Party for the Animals and Forum for Democracy: Paul Cliteur
- Democrats 66: Kajsa Ollongren

== See also ==
- Lijsttrekker, first candidate on a party's list
- Paper candidate
- Star candidate
