= Thierry Baudet =

Dutch author and politician (born 1983)

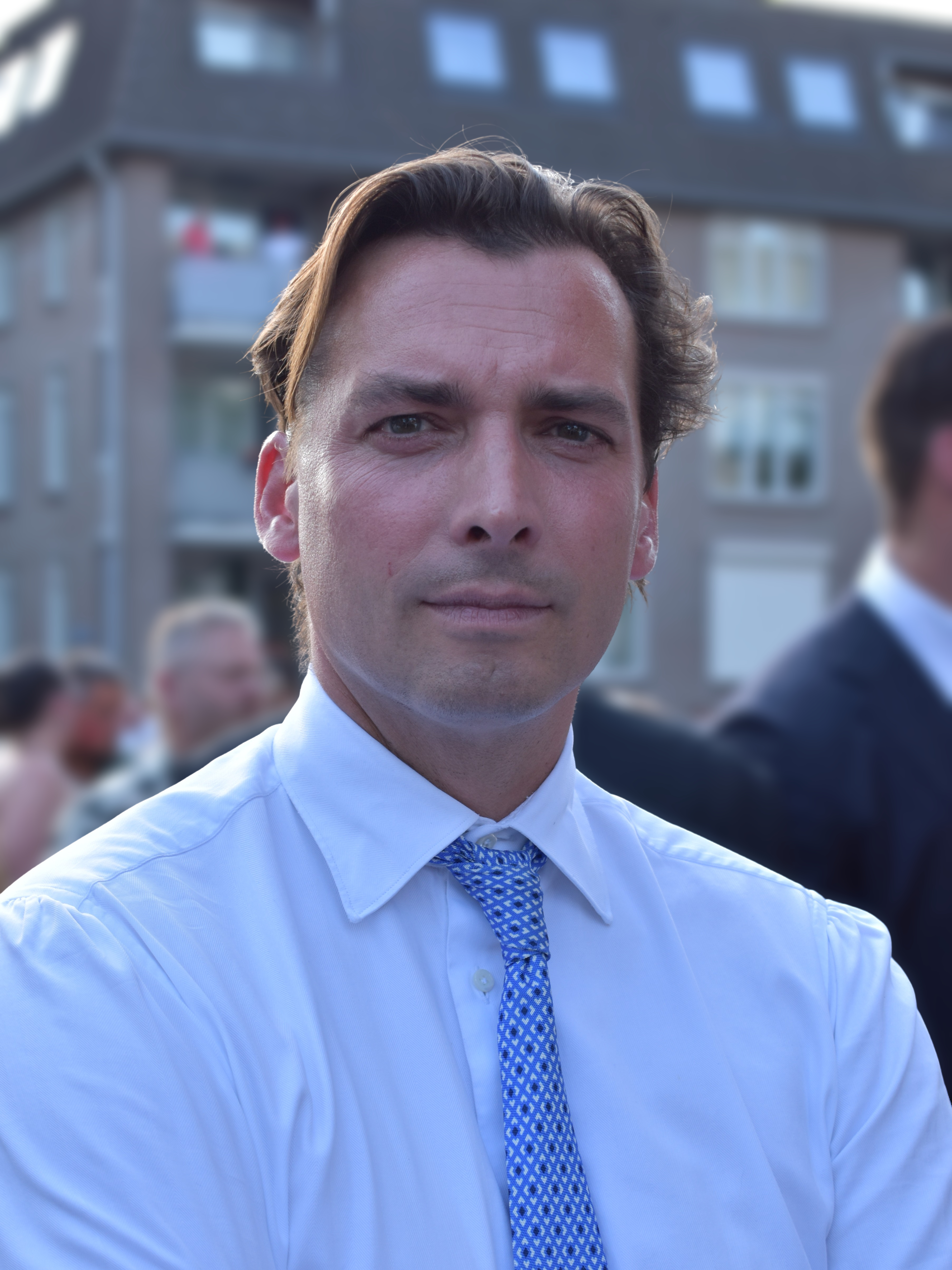
- Baudet in 2025

Chairman of Forum for Democracy
- Incumbent
- Assumed office 22 September 2016
- Preceded by: Party established

Leader of Forum for Democracy in the House of Representatives
- In office 1 April 2025 – 4 September 2025
- Preceded by: Gideon van Meijeren
- Succeeded by: Lidewij de Vos
- In office 23 March 2017 – 12 January 2025
- Preceded by: Position established
- Succeeded by: Gideon van Meijeren

Member of the House of Representatives
- In office 1 April 2025 – 11 January 2026
- Preceded by: Lidewij de Vos
- Succeeded by: Tom Russcher
- In office 23 March 2017 – 12 January 2025
- Succeeded by: Lidewij de Vos

Personal details
- Born: Thierry Henri Philippe Baudet; 28 January 1983 (age 43) Heemstede, Netherlands
- Party: Forum for Democracy (2016–present)
- Spouse: Davide Heijmans (m. 2021)
- Children: 2
- Education: University of Amsterdam (BA, LLM); Leiden University (PhD)
- Occupation: Politician, author

Thierry Henri Philippe Baudet (Dutch: [ˈtɕɛri boːˈdɛ(t), - bʌuˈdɛ(t)]; born 28 January 1983) is a Dutch politician, author, and self-declared conspiracy theorist. He is the founder, chairman and former leader of Forum for Democracy (FvD), for which he was a member of the House of Representatives between 2017 and 2026, with the exception of his paternity leave.

== Family ==
Baudet was born in Heemstede into a family of partial Huguenot ancestry. His forefather, Pierre Joseph Baudet, immigrated to the Batavian Republic in 1795 when his home in Hainaut was annexed by the French Republic, fleeing from conscription into the French Army. Baudet's great-great-grandmother, Ernestine van Heemskerck, was born in the Dutch East Indies and was of partly Indonesian parentage.

== Education ==
Baudet attended the Latin School of Haarlem, a college preparatory school with compulsory Latin and Ancient Greek. His first degree, from the University of Amsterdam, was in history, and from 2007 to 2012 he was a PhD student at Leiden University, where in 2012 he graduated as a Doctor of Philosophy with a thesis on national identity, European identity, and multiculturalism. The dissertation was supervised by professor Paul Cliteur and the British philosopher Roger Scruton, and was published in Dutch as De aanval op de natiestaat (The Attack on the Nation-State).

== Career ==
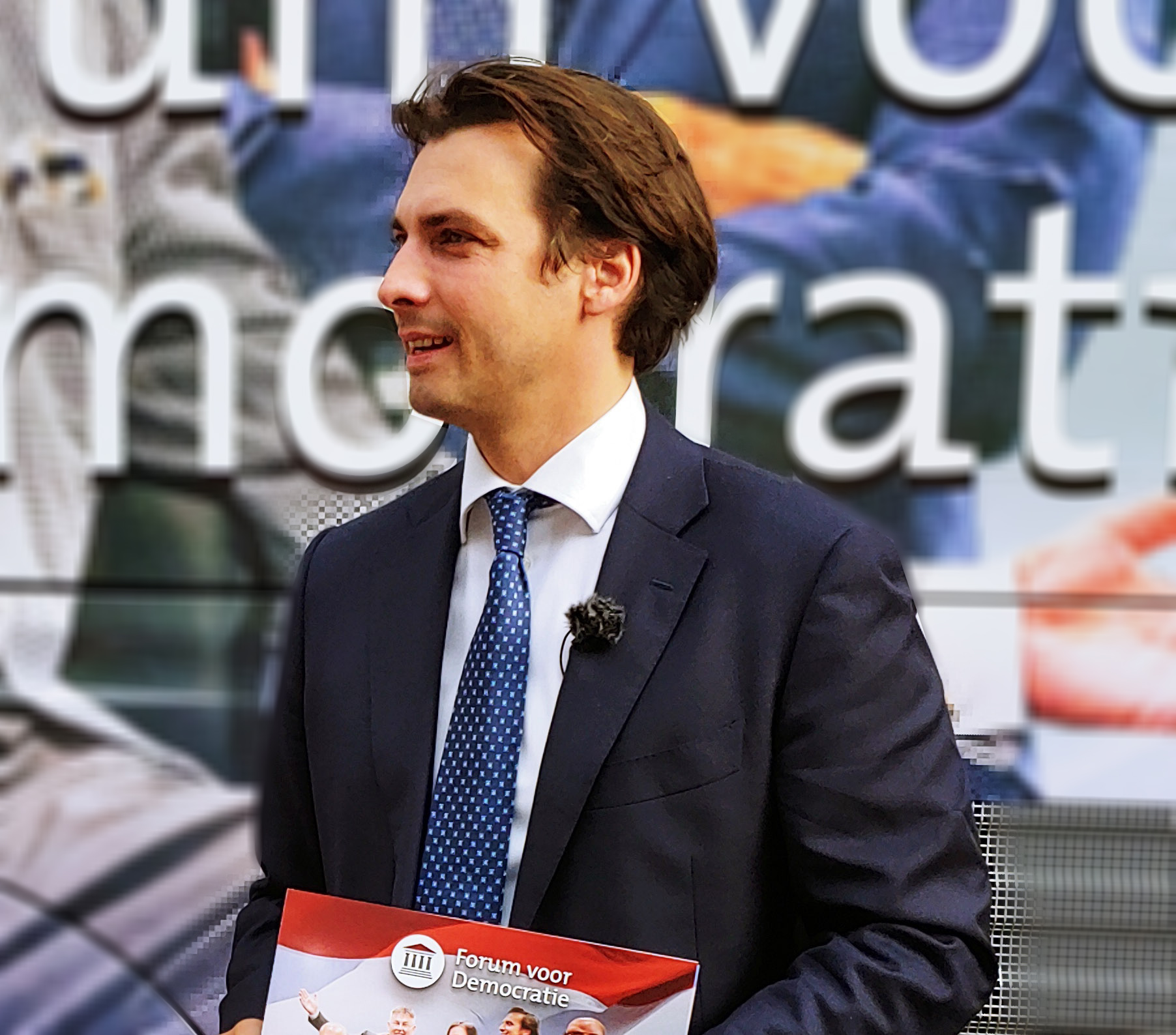
Baudet campaigning in 2020

Baudet was a post-doctoral fellow at Tilburg University in 2013. He also wrote a newspaper column in NRC Handelsblad from 2011 to 2012. In 2016, he founded the Forum for Democracy (FvD, Dutch: Forum voor Democratie), which became a political party, and he was elected along with Theo Hiddema to the House of Representatives in the 2017 general election.

In 2018, he was awarded the Prize for Liberty by the Flemish classical-liberal think tank Libera!.

On 26 October 2023, Baudet was assaulted with an umbrella upon his arrival at Ghent University. On 20 November 2023, he was hospitalised after being attacked with a bottle at a cafe in Groningen.

Baudet stepped down from the House of Representatives on 12 January 2025 for his paternity leave. He was replaced by Lidewij de Vos. He returned on 3 March 2025. He again stepped down from the House on 11 January 2026 to focus on the campaign for the March 2026 municipal elections and on the subsequent formation of local coalition governments.

== Political views ==
At the start of his political and writing career, Baudet was a national conservative and Eurosceptic, advocating for both the Netherlands' exit from the European Union (EU) and the eventual dissolution of the EU, as well as campaigning against unskilled immigration into the Netherlands. In a speech he described immigration as causing a "homeopathic dilution" of the Dutch culture, and in an interview said he wants to preserve the native cultures and ethnicities of Europe as they are. In 2017, Baudet expressed admiration for murdered Dutch politician Pim Fortuyn, and both ideological and personality comparisons between the two men were made by both Dutch and overseas media.

Since 2020, journalists, political analysts, former FvD politicians and political acquaintances of Baudet have described his views as having changed and shifted from conservatism and Dutch nationalism towards conspiracy theories, radical right, nativist and in some cases neo-fascist and antisemitic opinions. In 2024, Dutch political historian Robin te Slaa argued that Baudet "at the very least flirts with fascist ideology" while University of Amsterdam scholar Jan Willem Duyvendak has argued Baudet employs racial nativism and ethno-nationalism in his speeches.

In 2024, Baudet advocated for mass remigration in order to maintain a "white Europe".

=== Foreign policy ===
==== Russia and Ukraine ====
Baudet is opposed to the European Union–Ukraine Association Agreement. Together with GeenStijl and the Burgercomité EU association, Forum for Democracy was behind the campaign to collect the signatures required for the 2016 Dutch Ukraine–European Union Association Agreement referendum. Baudet and Forum for Democracy campaigned for the "No"-vote in this referendum. During the campaign, Baudet at multiple occasions spread fake news, including false reports of purported crimes by the Ukrainian military, and associated himself with pro-Russian activist Vladimir Kornilov.

In November 2016, Baudet co-signed a letter, initiated by the journalists Billy Six and Joost Niemöller, which questioned the independence of the MH17 investigations and requested Donald Trump to press for a new investigation. This led to criticism from surviving relatives. In May 2018, he supported the Dutch cabinet in holding Russia accountable for the MH17 shootdown incident. Baudet's WhatsApp chats were leaked to the media in 2020; these revealed his close contacts with Vladimir Kornilov, who Baudet described as "a Russian paid by Putin", and demonstrated a significant influence of Kornilov on Baudet's actions on Ukraine, the referendum and future anti-NATO campaigns. In the chats with his FvD colleagues, Baudet also alluded to financial support from Kornilov. Baudet disagreed with the conclusions drawn from these texts, and said that the text messages were quoted out of context. In February 2022, after Russia officially recognized separatist regions in Ukraine as independent nations and deployed military troops to the Donbas, Baudet voiced his approval of Vladimir Putin's actions. On 24 February 2022, during the Russian invasion of Ukraine, Baudet stated that Russia was "unnecessarily being vilified". During a debate in parliament on 28 February, he explicitly refused to condemn the invasion. In August 2022, Baudet described Putin as "a huge hero" fighting a "heroic" fight against "globalists".

==== Middle East ====
At the start of his career, Baudet held strongly pro-Israel views. He described Israel as "the only democracy in the Middle East" and supported moving the Dutch embassy to Jerusalem. However, these changed after the Gaza war, with Baudet praising DENK's (a party accused of Islamist and Turkish nationalist sympathies) views on the conflict. In January 2024, Baudet referred to Israel's actions as "ethnic cleansing" and suggested that Israel was planning to make money by selling new housing developments in the Gaza Strip. In March 2024, Baudet and DENK's Stephan van Baarle were the only two factional leaders in the House of Representatives to abstain on supporting a statement against antisemitism. Baudet has been critical of other European nationalist parties for taking pro-Israel stances and claimed that they consider "Israel more important than Europe."

=== Arts and religion ===
Baudet has strong opinions on the arts, the topic of his book Oikofobie; he considers non-Western art and Western post-1900 modernism in visual arts inferior to Western Realism, encourages education and programmation of tonal music opposed to atonal music, and dislikes modern post-1950 architecture. In reaction to this, self-described musicologist Yuri Landman warned Baudet for approaching the concept of degenerate art with his conservative criticism.

Baudet is not religious but has expressed sympathy for Christianity on several occasions. In an interview in 2017, he called himself an "agnostic cultural Christian". In an interview in 2022, he distanced himself from Christianity, saying it's a belief "for losers" that "lacks masculinity" and claimed his views align more to paganism. Baudet has been critical of Islam and expressed concern about both high levels and lack of assimilation of migrants from Islamic societies. In a 2017 interview, he expressed disagreement with the proposals made by another Dutch politician, Geert Wilders, to ban copies of the Quran. Meanwhile, he also praised Wilders as someone who "has put on the agenda the significant problem that we have with radical Islam in our time and Muslim immigration". Baudet has called for Islamic schools in the Netherlands to subscribe to Western values. He has criticised both Dutch and wider European handling of immigration and assimilation.

=== Dutch political system ===
Baudet frequently speaks about the perceived existence of a "party cartel", in which the main ruling parties of the Netherlands divide power among themselves and conspire towards the same goals, despite claiming to be competitors.

=== Other views and statements ===
In February 2018, Baudet was confronted with the question of whether there is a relation between IQ and race in a debate with Femke Halsema. Hiddema and the number two on Baudet's party list for the 2018 Dutch municipal elections in Amsterdam, Yernaz Ramautarsing, stated they believed it to be true while Baudet refused to answer the question. Deputy Prime Minister Kajsa Ollongren stated that Forum for Democracy is a bigger threat than the Party for Freedom and that members have an unhealthy fascination for race differences; Baudet made a complaint for defamation at an Amsterdam police station. Hiddema supported him as his advocate. In February 2021, Elsevier reported it had uncovered WhatsApp messages sent by Baudet to fellow party members, in which he claims white people have a higher IQ than Hispanics and African-Americans. Baudet and several other members reportedly also sent messages in which they used racial slurs and expressed their opposition to interracial relationships.

Baudet is an adherent of the Cultural Marxism conspiracy theory, which states there is a calculated effort to destroy Western culture by academic and intellectual means. Baudet accuses the European Union of being "a Cultural Marxist project, with the aim of destroying European Civilization". Baudet has stated that COVID-19 was introduced by George Soros to "steal freedom", a claim he denies. He has also allegedly made anti-semitic comments. Following these claims in November 2020, published by one of his party's Senators, Baudet temporarily resigned as leader of the party and the party allegedly split. He soon returned as party leader but by then many party members had left Forum for Democracy, including the majority of the Senators and all of the party's members of the European Parliament. In 2021, Baudet responded to an article about the migrant population of Brussels by tweeting that an "escape-strategy, Madagascar or something" was needed. This was widely perceived as a reference to the Madagascar Plan, the plan by the government of Nazi Germany to forcibly relocate the entire European Jewish population to Madagascar.

Baudet and Members of Parliament of his party have repeatedly compared measures to combat the spread of COVID-19 to the persecution of Jews by Nazi Germany. In May 2021, this led to another split in the party. In September 2021, Baudet attended a protest against the measures to combat COVID-19, in which several protesters wore Jewish badges, which drew condemnation. This led five Jewish organisations to ask parliament to explicitly distance itself from comparisons of the measures with the persecution of Jews and the Holocaust. In response, Baudet issued a tweet in which he stated that Jewish organisations "do not own the war", and wrote the word Holocaust within quotation marks, which was interpreted as an antisemitic dog whistle. Baudet was widely condemned by other politicians and Jewish organisations. He is pro-Russian, and has said that the Russian invasion of Ukraine is the fault of the West. He also stated that the September 11 attacks were false flag operations and insinuated that the Apollo 11 Moon landing was staged, both implemented by the United States government.

In an October 2022 interview, Baudet promoted the conspiracy theory that the world is controlled by "evil reptilians". He also said he was a fan of Vladimir Putin, whom he called "a hero we need". He said the Russian president is the only one who can take on the elite. He believes Putin must win the war against Ukraine and says "we must do everything we can to support him". Baudet later claimed in his defense that he was expressing a metaphor rather than a belief that the world is controlled by reptilians, however this was disputed by journalists and opponents.

== Personal life ==
Although once identifying with cultural Christianity, Baudet has since argued that "Christianity lacks masculinity" and stated his personal religious outlook is closer to paganism. Baudet claimed to have had a love affair with political commentator Eva Vlaardingerbroek in 2017. Vlaardingerbroek responded that it had been nothing more than a brief fling. In 2018, Baudet said that his girlfriend was an Iranian refugee. In December 2021, Baudet married Dutch photographer Davide Heijmans. Their son, Lancelot, was born in September 2022, and their daughter, Penelope, was born in January 2025.

== Electoral history ==
Electoral history of Thierry Baudet
Year	Body	Party	Pos.	Votes	Result		Ref.
Year	Body	Party	Pos.	Votes	Party seats	Individual	Ref.
2017	House of Representatives	Forum for Democracy	1	124,991	2	Won	
2021	House of Representatives	Forum for Democracy	1	245,323	8	Won	
2023	House of Representatives	Forum for Democracy	1	163,881	3	Won	
2024	European Parliament	Forum for Democracy	31 (Note: Baudet participated as a lijstduwer.)	13,814	0	Lost	
2025	House of Representatives	Forum for Democracy	2	22,032	7	Won	
2026	Amsterdam Municipal Council	Forum for Democracy	25	1,708	1	Lost	

== Published works ==
- 2010: (ed. with Michiel Visser) Conservatieve Vooruitgang. De grootste denkers van de 20ste eeuw (Conservative progress. The greatest thinkers of the 20th century). Prometheus/Bert Bakker.
- 2011: (ed. with Michiel Visser) Revolutionair Verval en de conservatieve vooruitgang in de 18de en 19de eeuw (Revolutionary decline and conservative progress in the 18th and 19th centuries). Prometheus/Bert Bakker.
- 2012: Pro Europa dus tegen de EU (Pro Europe therefore against the EU). Elsevier
- 2012: The Significance of Borders. Why representative government and the rule of law require nation-states. Brill Academic Publishers. PhD dissertation
- 2012: De aanval op de natiestaat (The attack on the nation state). Prometheus/Bert Bakker.
- 2013: Oikofobie. De angst voor het eigene (Oikophobia. The fear of home). Prometheus/Bert Bakker.
- 2014: (ed. with Geert Mak) Thuis in de Tijd (At home in time). Prometheus/Bert Bakker. ISBN 9789035141988
- 2014: (with Arie Boomsma) Van Bach tot Bernstein. Klassieke muziek voor iedereen (From Bach to Bernstein. Classical music for everyone). ISBN 9789044627084
- 2014: Voorwaardelijke liefde (Conditional love. [Novel]). Amsterdam: Prometheus/Bert Bakker. ISBN 9789044626810
- 2017: Breek het partijkartel! De noodzaak van referenda (Break the party cartel. The necessity of referendums). Amsterdam: Prometheus/Bert Bakker. ISBN 9789044633689
- 2018: Van elk waarheen bevrijd (Delivered from all whereto. [Novel]). Amsterdam: Prometheus/Bert Bakker. ISBN 9789044637359
- 2020: Politiek van het gezond verstand (Politics of common sense). Amsterdam: Amsterdam Books. ISBN 9789083063010
- 2020: De ravage van tien jaar Rutte (The havoc of ten years' Rutte). Amsterdam: Amsterdam Books. ISBN 9789083063041
