= Forum for Democracy =

Dutch political party

Forum for Democracy Forum voor Democratie
- Abbreviation: FVD; FvD
- Leader: Lidewij de Vos
- Chairperson: Thierry Baudet
- Leader in the House of Representatives: Lidewij de Vos
- Leader in the Senate: Johan Dessing
- Founders: Thierry Baudet; Henk Otten
- Founded: 1 September 2016
- Headquarters: Herengracht 74, Amsterdam
- Youth wing: Jongerenorganisatie Forum voor Democratie (JFvD)
- Think tank: Renaissance Institute
- Membership (2026): ▲70,687
- Ideology: National conservatism; Right-wing populism; Neo-fascism
- Political position: Far-right
- European affiliation: ESN Party (since 2024) (Note: The party was formerly part of ECR Party (2019–2022) and were non-affiliated (2022–2024).)
- European Parliament group: None (since 2024) (Note: The party was formerly part of the ID Group (2022), were Non-Inscrits (2020–2022), the ECR Group (2019–2020) and were Non-Inscrits (2022–2024).)
- Colors: Maroon
- House of Representatives: 7 / 150
- Senate: 3 / 75
- States-Provincial: 15 / 570
- European Parliament: 0 / 31
- Municipal councils: 295 / 8,610

Website
- fvd.nl

Forum for Democracy (Dutch: Forum voor Democratie [ˈfoːrʏɱ voːr ˌdeːmoːkraːˈ(t)si], FVD or FvD) is a far-right political party in the Netherlands, originally founded as a think tank by Thierry Baudet and Henk Otten in 2015 before registering itself as a party the following year. The FVD first participated in elections in the 2017 general election, winning two seats in the House of Representatives.

At the time of its conception, the FVD was a conservative liberal and Eurosceptic movement positioned on the right-wing of the political spectrum. During its initial years, the FVD was defined as a national conservative political party focused on opposing Dutch membership of the European Union, political reform and protection of Dutch culture. Following the 2017 general election, the FVD saw a period of popularity in opinion polls and grew to become the largest party during the 2019 Dutch provincial elections. However, it underwent an ideological change and adopted increasingly radical policies and messages following the departure of several of its founding members and saw a subsequent decline in support. Presently, the FVD is regarded by media and political analysts to be a right-wing populist, nativist, far-right, radical right, neo-fascist, or extreme-right political party.

== History ==
=== Founding and early years (2016–2018) ===
The FVD was established by Thierry Baudet and Henk Otten as a citizens initiative and then a think tank whose main feat was campaigning in the 2016 Dutch Ukraine–European Union Association Agreement referendum and against the EU in general. The think-tank argued for the introduction of a referendum act and campaigned with GeenPeil to have an inquiry into Dutch membership of the eurozone. In 2015, Baudet along with journalists Jort Kelder and Arno Wellens took the initiative to parliament to call for a debate on the eurozone.

In September 2016, it converted itself into a political party founded by Baudet, Henk Otten and Rob Rooken and announced its intention to take part in the 2017 general election. The FVD ended up with 1.8% of the vote, entering parliament for the first time with two seats taken by Baudet and well-known lawyer and commentator Theo Hiddema.

In February 2018, in part due to its rapidly growing pace, the party suffered from internal issues with a number of prominent members leaving the party because they felt the party had a lack of internal democracy.

=== Electoral breakthrough (2018–2019) ===
In the 2018 municipal elections, the FVD won three seats on the Amsterdam city council. The party only stood in Amsterdam. In Rotterdam however it endorsed the Livable Rotterdam party.

During the 2019 provincial elections, FVD made a major breakthrough and won 86 seats, spread across the twelve provinces of the Netherlands. In South Holland, North Holland, and Flevoland, FVD became the largest party, winning 11, nine, and eight seats. As populists, the bulk of the Forum's nominated parliamentary candidates did not have prior active experience in other political parties. On 30 April 2020, Forum for Democracy formed a coalition with the Christian Democratic Appeal (CDA) in the North Brabant province, the first time the party had formally entered into the administration of a regional authority.

The FVD gained three MEPs during the 2019 European Parliament election. The party's lead candidate was journalist and former Lijst Dedecker politician Derk Jan Eppink. After the election, they joined the European Conservatives and Reformists.

In August 2019, former FVD senator and founding member Henk Otten announced he had registered Group Otten (GO) as a new political party. GO had two seats in the Senate and one seat in the European Parliament which were taken up by former FVD members.

In late 2020, former VVD MP Wybren van Haga defected to the party.

=== Internal divides (2020–2021) ===
In 2020, a series of rows and divides broke out within the party. The events began in April 2020 after HP/De Tijd revealed instances of antisemitism, racism, homophobia and extreme comments including glorification of Anders Breivik and Brenton Tarrant in online WhatsApp groups associated with FVD's youth wing, the Jongerenorganisatie Forum voor Democratie (JFVD). The FVD executive board later investigated these instances and claimed not all the people involved were FVD members but discharged three individuals from the party. Three additional members were also suspended. In a statement, the FVD described the messages as "completely unacceptable." More similar messages were revealed in November by newspaper Het Parool which published an article about extremist comments made by members the party's youth organization in social media chats, including support for Nazi Germany, which led to several JFVD coordinators being removed from their positions. At the same time, other former members of the JFVD came forward and claimed that they had raised concerns about extremist messages to the youth-wing board and the FVD's leadership but had been expelled from the party for sending "defamatory material" to the media.

In response, an internal committee of inquiry was launched at the behest of the youth-wing for the party's executive board to investigate the issue. Some FVD politicians such as Hiddema argued that the youth wing should be disbanded and replaced while others stated the FVD should follow the example of the Sweden Democrats by threatening the youth-wing with disassociation from the mother party unless it cleaned up. Baudet also announced he would resign as the lead candidate for the 2021 general election and Lennart van der Linden stood in as the party's temporary leader. The day after Baudet stood aside as leader, party vice-leader Hiddema vacated his seat in the House for "personal reasons," although some media outlets speculated that this was due to controversies within the party. The following day, Senator Paul Cliteur also resigned from his position as Senate leader while remaining a member of the party.

A day after his resignation, Baudet reversed his decision and said the party would hold a leadership contest. In response, several prominent FVD members accused Baudet of making antisemitic and racist statements. On 26 November 2020, Algemeen Dagblad obtained a letter by FVD Senator Nicki Pouw-Verweij alleging multiple incidents that had taken place during a campaign meeting for the election and at a dinner party held on 20 November for the FVD's candidates. These included Baudet repeatedly making antisemitic jokes and statements and expressing conspiracy theories such as claiming that the COVID-19 lockdowns were concocted by George Soros and lashing out at party colleague Joost Eerdmans who had challenged Baudet's remarks. Pouw-Verweij also claimed that while Baudet had criticized the party's youth-wing in public, he had privately supported some of the statements made by its members, and furthermore argued that the FVD had become more focused on conspiracy theories and trying to draw publicity by provoking controversy instead of holding serious policy discussions. Her accusations were supported by FVD candidates Eerdmans and Eva Vlaardingerbroek. Other FVD spokespeople including Olaf Ephraim disputed the allegations and claimed that Baudet had expressed provocative opinions but was not a "fascist, homophobe, or Nazi sympathizer." Baudet also denied the accusations during a subsequent talk show interview. After a stalemate was reached with half of the FVD's executive board supporting Baudet and the other half calling for him to stand aside, the board announced an internal referendum among the membership on whether to keep Baudet as leader or expel him from the party and replace him with a new lead candidate. This took place on 3 December 2020, with 76% of FVD members voting in favour of Baudet remaining in the party and resuming the role of its leader. In protest at the outcome, the FVD's three MEPs, seven of its senators and some of its parliamentary candidates for the upcoming general election announced their departure from the party. Many of them joined JA21 founded by Eerdmans and former FVD Senator Annabel Nanninga who had quit in response to what they saw as the party's inadequate handling of the youth-wing controversies and clashes with Baudet. Both said that the new party would stay closer to the FVD's original ideas.

=== Splits and radicalization (2021–2024) ===
At the 2021 general election, the party campaigned against COVID-19 lockdown measures in the Netherlands imposed by the Dutch government and managed to win eight MPs. However, the issue of racist comments from youth members was brought up again during the campaign. One of the accused youth members, Gideon van Meijeren, was elected into parliament, as was youth wing chairman Freek Jansen.

During the COVID-19 pandemic, the party caused controversy and saw another three of its MPs leave in May 2021 after it released a poster comparing lockdown measures with the Nazi occupation of the Netherlands. The analogy and timing of the poster was criticized by the Central Jewish Board of the Netherlands. Baudet declined to apologize for the poster, saying that causing controversy was an integral part of FVD. The three former FVD MPs; Van Haga, Ephraim and Hans Smolders later founded the Belang van Nederland with Van Haga stating on Twitter that he had resigned from the FVD due to "a difference of opinion about how to engage in politics" and that his new party would continue the FVD's ideas. During the pandemic, members of FVD were accused of circulating conspiracy theories regarding the COVID-19 vaccine and using further Holocaust comparisons with vaccinations and social distancing. In December 2021, a Dutch court found Baudet guilty of "creating a breeding ground for antisemitism" with his statements and ordered him to delete social media posts comparing COVID policies to the Holocaust or face a fine. Baudet denied that his statements were intended to be offensive or antisemitic.

In 2022, the FVD regained representation in the European Parliament when Marcel de Graaff defected to the party. As a result, the FVD became a member of the Identity and Democracy group instead of the European Conservatives and Reformists (ECR). In 2022 FVD left the European Conservatives and Reformists Party. In March 2022, two of the party's Senators Hiddema and Paul Frentrop left the party in protest at the FVD's decision not to attend Ukrainian President Volodymyr Zelenskyy's speech to the House of Representatives, leaving only Senator Johan Dessing. In October 2022, the FVD was suspended from the Identity and Democracy group after de Graaff expressed support for Putin on Twitter. He later quit the group and the FVD subsequently became a Non-Inscrit member of European Parliament.

In April 2023, a number of former party representatives and employees within the parliamentary group and at the party's head office described an unsafe environment within the FVD that had remained private for a number of years and included racism and antisemitism. A former press officer for the party claimed the FVD's direction and working environment was partly due to Baudet's excessive drinking.

During the 2023 Dutch Senate election the party retained two seats.

For the 2023 Dutch general election, the FVD again nominated Baudet as the party's lead candidate. The FVD saw a reduced result and won three MPs, with Baudet, Jansen, and Van Meijeren retaining their seats. Some commentators attributed the smaller result to the FVD losing voters back to Geert Wilders and the Party for Freedom. In January 2024, Baudet announced the party had founded a branch in the Dutch-speaking Flemish region of Belgium to contest the 2024 European elections and future Flemish elections. However, the party did not collect enough signatures to appear on the Flanders ballot and did not secure enough votes in the Netherlands to return an MEP. The FVD subsequently left the European Parliament. In August 2024, it joined the Europe of Sovereign Nations with Alternative for Germany.

=== Leadership change (2025–present) ===
In the run-up to the 2025 Dutch general election, the FVD announced Lidewij de Vos would replace Baudet as lead candidate. She had previously stood in for Baudet in the House of Representatives when he was on paternity leave. This was seen as a move to reattract support for the party. In an interview with Algemeen Dagblad Baudet said he had become "an obstacle" for the party due to his image and wanted a younger leadership with a new style to take over. According to Dutch political scientist Chris Aalberts, the change was more of a cosmetic measure since the party's political course is determined by the FVD executive board which Aalberts claimed only consists of Baudet and a few of his confidants. In September 2025, the party gained another representative in the Senate after former BBB Senator Eric Kemperman defected to the FVD's faction.

The party saw an improvement on its previous general election result with 4.5% of the vote and 7 seats.

== Ideology and political positions ==
The FVD's ideology and beliefs have shifted over time. During the period of its foundation in 2016, the FVD was initially described as a national conservative, eurosceptic and a conservative liberal political party. The party self-identified as liberal conservative and sat on the right-wing of the political spectrum. The party initially focused on drawing support from former People's Party for Freedom and Democracy (VVD) voters who felt the VVD had grown too soft on the policy areas of European Union and immigration, but saw Geert Wilders' Party for Freedom (PVV) as too hardline, and tried recruiting candidates who came from professional rather than political backgrounds. During its early years, the FVD was also described as one of several contemporary conservative-populist parties in the Netherlands that have been inspired by or inherited the mantle of the defunct Pim Fortuyn List.

On its official platform, the FVD declares itself to be a movement rather than a party with a focus on protecting Dutch sovereignty, identity, and cultural and intellectual property. The party wants stricter immigration and integration policies, calling for the protection of high culture and "Judeo-Christian values". The FVD is also opposed to the integration of the European Union which it claims will lead to eventual Eurofederalism and supports a referendum on Dutch membership of EU.

After establishing itself, the FVD and its platform was perceived by political commentators as a standard Eurosceptic and national populist political party. It was variously described as ideologically national conservative, Hard Eurosceptic, and right-wing populist. In a 2019 column for the Dutch newspaper Het Financieele Dagblad, historian and philosopher Jozef Waanders described the FVD at the time as containing various ideological factions with strands of libertarianism and moderate conservatism, including members sympathetic to the ideas of Ayn Rand and Michel Houellebecq. Both party spokespeople and outside observers dismissed labelling the FVD as a far-right party at the time of its foundation, but various political commentators in the Netherlands and abroad have since described the party as moving towards the far-right of the spectrum. (Note: Multiple sources: Botje, Harm Ede; Cohen, Mischa (19 November 2021). "Forum voor Democratie heeft zijn masker afgezet de juisten zijn nu over". parool.nl.; "Politicoloog ziet Forum voor Democratie steeds verder radicaliseren". 22 November 2021. Archived from the original on 27 October 2022.; Fallon, Katy (25 March 2019). "Forum voor Democratie: Why has the Dutch far right surged?". Al Jazeera. Archived from the original on 8 November 2020.; Boztas, Senay (23 March 2019). "Surprise electoral win leaves far-Right populists scrambling to fill seats". The Telegraph. Archived from the original on 1 May 2021.; Schaart, Eline (20 March 2019). "Far-right populists score stunning win in Dutch provincial vote". Politico. Archived from the original on 30 August 2021.; Tierolf, Bas; Drost, Lisanne; van Kapel, Maaike (December 2018). Zevende rapportage racisme, antisemitisme en extreemrechts geweld in Nederland (PDF) (Report) (in Netherlands Dutch). Verwey-Jonker Instituut. p. 35. ISBN 978-90-5830-912-9. Archived (PDF) from the original on 18 August 2020.; "Dutch far-right politician supports Trump's action against "left wing extremism"". NL Times. June 2020.) The FVD has also been accused of drawing links with the alt-right movement with NRC Handelsblad alleging the FVD was attempting to cultivate popularity among the alt-right in 2017, although the party did not identify itself as such at the time.

In 2019, political commentators and authors began to describe the FVD as moving further to the right of the PVV following the departure of several of its founding members and adoption of more radical political stances. By 2020, observers argued that Baudet and the FVD had undergone an ideological shift and adopted rhetoric deemed far-right. Since 2022, commentators have described the party's current program as neo-fascist. Ahead of the 2024 European Parliament election, the FVD was claimed to be an extreme-right party by journalist Jon Henley and Cas Mudde, who differentiated the FVD from national-populist parties such as the PVV, French National Rally and Vox in Spain since these parties do not reject democracy, while the FVD has promoted conspiracy theories and called for the creation of a "countersociety." The FVD has also been compared to the Alternative for Germany (AfD) party whereby both the AfD and FVD started out as conservative and standard Eurosceptic movements but subsequently followed an opposite trend to other European populist parties that have moderated themselves by moving in a more hardline direction since the early 2020s and containing representatives who openly express statements considered extreme.

=== Domestic policy ===
One of the major issues FVD campaigns against is the perceived existence of a "party cartel" in which the main ruling parties of the country divide power among themselves and work towards the same goals despite claiming to be competitors. The party promises direct democracy through binding referendums as well as directly elected mayors and a directly elected Prime Minister. The party is also in favor of the government consisting of apolitical experts in their respective fields ("technocracy"), and top civil servants having to reapply for their positions whenever a new cabinet is formed.

==== Society and culture ====
FVD supports high culture. It argues for the protection of Dutch culture and "European classical music, art and knowledge." It is critical of modern architecture, calling for both new government buildings to be constructed in a neoclassical style and for city planning that "fits within a historical view." FVD also supports the establishment of a commission to protect historic monuments from destruction, wants Frysk to be retained as a second state language, calls for schools to teach about "beautiful things that the West has produced" and supports free museum admission for all Dutch citizens. The party has promoted plans to defund and privatize the Nederlandse Publieke Omroep, a Dutch public broadcasting organization.

==== Social issues ====
Historically the party has argued for equal treatment of people of different sexual orientations and was more supportive of gay rights, although it now calls for the protection of children against what it describes as "woke and LGBT propaganda" and supports prohibiting minors from being in Pride parades and taking hormone therapy. The FVD's current platform also calls for an end to the promotion of LGBT campaigns by government institutions, for a ban on "transgender propaganda" targeting minors and opposes flying Pride flags from government buildings. FVD has spoken out against feminism and has promoted traditional gender roles such as that of the "masculine man that supports his family". The FVD also supports a retraction for all apologies made by Dutch governments for Dutch colonial history.

On abortion, the FVD supported the current Dutch laws regarding abortion until 2019 and held a generally moderate voting record on the matter until a 2022 debate when it took a more socially conservative stance by referring to abortion as "inhumane" and argued the abortion limit should be reduced from 24 to 18 weeks and that it should only be possible in cases of rape, incest or danger to the mother's life.

==== Criminal justice ====
The party calls for a reform of the Dutch justice system, increased funding for the Dutch police force, tougher penalties against those convicted of violent crimes and where possible for non-naturalized immigrants found guilty of serious crimes to be deported and tried in their country of origin. FVD also supports deleting Articles 93 and 94 from the Dutch constitution which enables international law to take precedence above national law in some cases.

FVD calls for a gradual legalization of soft drugs but also supports reducing the number of cannabis coffee shops within the vicinity of schools.

==== Immigration ====
The FVD has adopted a nationalist viewpoint in which the Dutch culture should be protected and presently argues for mass and incentivized remigration of foreign nationals from the Netherlands. The party calls for a ten year freeze on issuing Dutch citizenship and residency and for Dutch withdrawal from international migration treaties.

In its initial 2017 platform, the party favoured reinstating border controls and ending what it perceives as mass immigration, instead calling for a points based system for skilled immigration. It also supported an end to the Schengen agreement and for Dutch borders to be monitored with digital and biometric technology. It also campaigned against unchecked immigration and said it would introduce a Dutch Values Protection Act. In 2018, the party said that it supported freedom of religion and called for equal treatment of all citizens regardless of gender, race or sexual orientation, but expressed opposition to any further influence of Islamic culture on Dutch society, supports a crackdown on forced or child marriages and wants to ban Islamic face veils and other face coverings. The FVD also opposes foreign funding of Islamic schools and institutions, and argues that all schools in the Netherlands should subscribe to "Judeo-Christian values." FVD also states that immigrants who do not wish to integrate should be offered incentives to return to their native country and that whenever possible asylum seekers should be processed off Dutch soil. The party also supports withdrawing the Netherlands from the UN 1951 Refugee Convention and expanding the Royal Marechaussee to patrol Dutch borders.

The FVD has gradually hardened some of its rhetoric on immigration, with party leader Baudet arguing that he does not want Europe to "Africanize." In 2024, Baudet and the FVD advocated for mass remigration in order to maintain a "white Europe". Baudet and the party have also criticised the immigration policies of Geert Wilders and the PVV as being too liberal. During a speech in Belgium, Baudet said "You have to organize mass remigration, because there are already far too many people here."

=== Economy ===
FVD in the economic field supports economic liberalism. The party is a proponent of the introduction of a high tax-free bracket for everyone, the abolition of taxes on gifts and inheritance and a radical simplification of tax brackets. The party is a proponent of drastic changes in elementary and secondary education, focusing on performance evaluations for teachers. It wants to expand the armed forces, expanding the National Reserve Corps and reverting defense budget cuts.

=== Environment ===
The party calls for a reduction in the use of plastic, more support for the agricultural economy, sustainable farming and tougher laws against animal cruelty. In the spring of 2019, the party, endorsing a climate change denialist platform, intensively campaigned against large state investments in renewable energy, leading to a victory in the provincial elections. Later that year, it also supported protests by Dutch farmers against enforcing legislation on nitrogen emissions.

=== Foreign policy ===
==== International relations ====
The FVD's initial foreign policy stances aligned to Atlanticism and pro-Western positions before moving to a more neutral attitude with the party claiming "there are no friends or enemies" in foreign policy and arguing Dutch interests must come first. In 2022, party leader Baudet claimed that NATO expansion, EU "colour revolutions" in post-Soviet states and the Arab Spring were all part of an ambition by the United States to achieve global regime change. The FVD supports strengthening ties with BRICS countries and for an end to Dutch sanctions on Russia.

==== Defence ====
Early on, FVD held a more pro-NATO stance but has since shifting to blaming NATO countries for the escalation of the Russo-Ukrainian War and since the 2022 Russian invasion of Ukraine has openly supported the Russian view of the conflict, with the party's current platform calling the invasion a "stupid NATO war against Russia."

The FVD is alleged to have been among European parties who received funding from Russia to influence political debates according to a leaked report by the Czech intelligence service in 2024, although this was denied by Baudet who claimed the allegations were a "witch hunt" against the party.

==== Middle East ====
Initially, the FVD held a strongly pro-Israel attitude towards the Israeli–Palestinian conflict and Baudet stated in 2017 that the FVD supported Israel "unconditionally" by considering the country a democratic ally. However, the party began criticizing both sides following the start of the Gaza war and has become more critical of Israel's role with Baudet praising the pro-Palestinian DENK's stance on the conflict. In March 2024, Baudet and DENK's Stephan van Baarle were the only two parliamentary leaders in the House of Representatives to abstain on supporting a statement against antisemitism. Baudet has described Israeli actions as "ethnic cleansing" and suggested that Israel was planning to make money by selling new housing developments in the Gaza Strip.

In 2024, Baudet expressed criticism of the PVV and Vlaams Belang for holding pro-Israel stances and supporting Ukraine and claimed that they consider "Israel more important than Europe."

==== European Union ====
The party states that it supports protecting European civilization and wants free trade between European nations and the world but is opposed to the European Union (EU) and the Eurozone. The party calls for an immediate end to EU enlargement and for the Netherlands to use every veto possible to prevent the EU from becoming a federal superstate. It also supports referendums and Dutch withdrawal from the Eurozone and the Schengen Agreement. FVD also wants a renegotiation of Dutch membership of the EU followed by a binding referendum on EU membership and an "intelligent exit" (Nexit) from the EU if it cannot be reformed and terms cannot be met.

==== Netherlands ====
The party leader Thierry Baudet supported the idea of the Greater Netherlands, claiming that Flanders "actually just belongs to us".

== Election results ==
=== House of Representatives ===
Election	Lead candidate	List	Votes	%	Seats	+/–	Government
2017	Thierry Baudet	List	187,162	1.78	2 / 150	New	Opposition
2021	Thierry Baudet	List	521,102	5.02	8 / 150	▲6	Opposition
2023	Thierry Baudet	List	232,963	2.23	3 / 150	▼5	Opposition
2025	Lidewij de Vos	List	480,393	4.54	7 / 150	▲4	Opposition

=== Senate ===
Election	List	Votes	%	Seats	+/–	Government
2019	List	27,473	15.87	12 / 75	New	Opposition
2023	List	4,866	2.72	2 / 75	▼10	Opposition

=== European Parliament ===
Election	List	Votes	%	Seats	+/–	EP Group
2019	List	602,507	10.96	3 / 26	New	ECR (2019–2020); ID (2022); NI (2022–2024)
2019	List	602,507	10.96	4 / 29	▲1	ECR (2019–2020); ID (2022); NI (2022–2024)
2024	List	155,187	2.49	0 / 31	▼4	

=== Provincial ===
Election	Votes	%	Seats	+/–
2019	1,057,029	14.53	86 / 570	New
2023	237,899	3.07	15 / 572	▼71

=== Municipal ===
Election	Votes	%	Seats	+/–
2018	20,015	0.29	3 / 7,981	New
2022	76,750	1.11	50 / 8,237	▲47
2026	307,605	4.03	299 / 8,554	▲249

== Organization ==
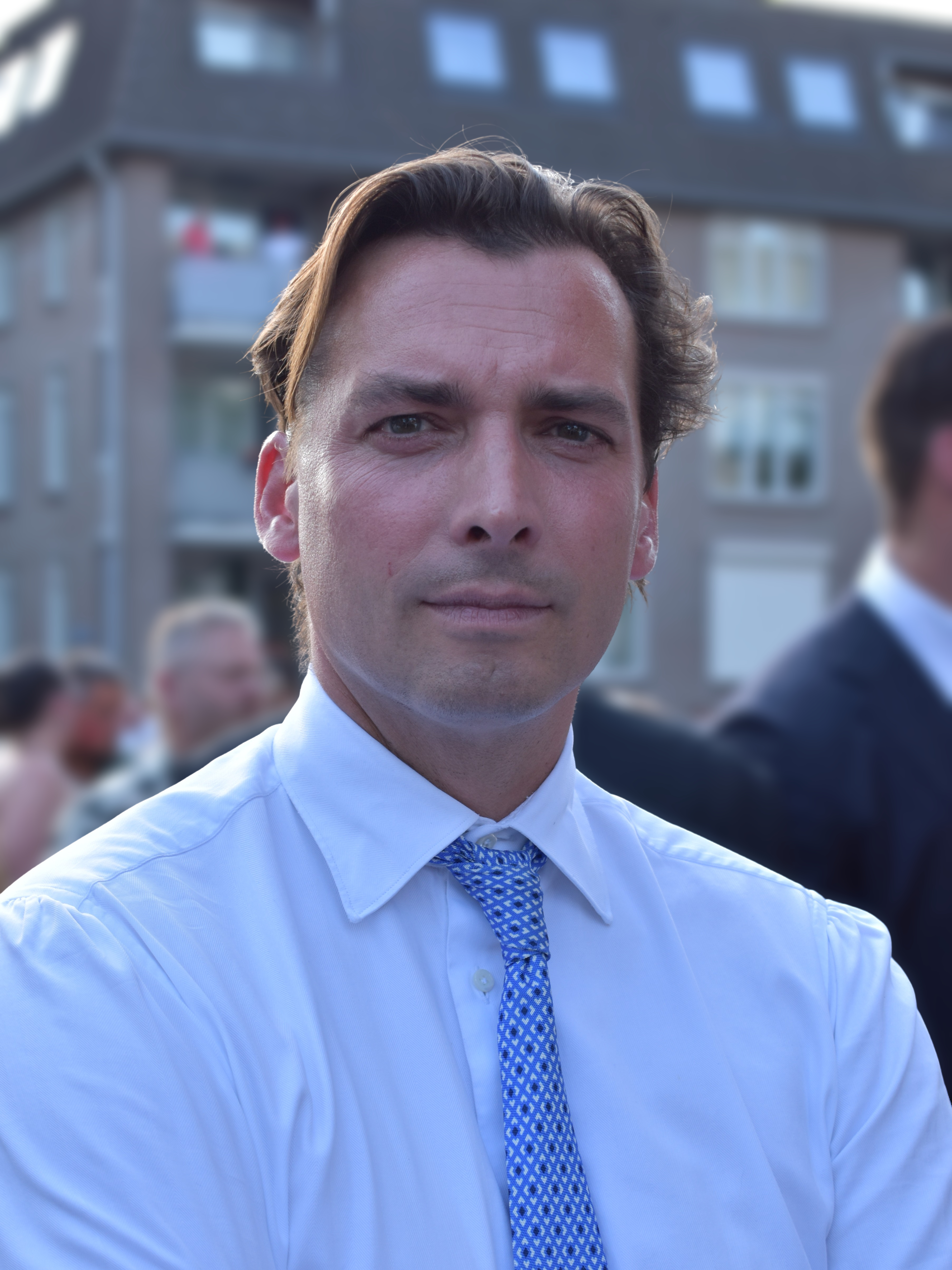
Thierry Baudet, founder and leader of the party

=== Leadership ===
- Leaders
  - Thierry Baudet (since 22 September 2016)
- Chairman
  - Thierry Baudet (22 September 2016 – 17 January 2017; since 25 November 2017)
  - Paul Frentrop (interim; 17 January 2017 – 24 November 2017)
- Leaders in the House of Representatives
  - Thierry Baudet (23 March 2017 – 4 September 2025)
  - Lidewij de Vos (since 4 September 2025)

=== Membership ===
Prior to 2022, party membership numbers of FVD were not independently verified and have been disputed.

Party membership
Year	Membership
2017	1,863
2018	22,884
2019	30,674
2020	43,716
2021	45,322
2022	58,890
2023	61,284
2024	61,633
2025	60,163
2026	70,687

=== Flemish chapter ===
Forum for Democracy founded a Flemish chapter in January 2024. It intended to participate in the June 2024 European Parliament election in Belgium's Dutch-speaking electoral college, but the party did not manage to collect the required amount of signatures.

=== International affiliations ===
In the European Parliament, the FVD initially sat with the European Conservatives and Reformists (ECR) after being admitted into the group following the 2019 European Parliament election in the Netherlands. During this time, the FVD maintained relations and dialogue with fellow ECR member parties the Sweden Democrats, Flemish N-VA, Poland's Law and Justice and the British Conservative Party.

Following a split in the FVD in 2020, its former MEP's defected to JA21 party and joined European Conservatives and Reformists Party. FVD subsequently left the European Conservatives and Reformists Party and was affiliated with the Identity and Democracy (ID) political group with the French National Rally, Vlaams Belang, Danish People's Party, Italian Lega and the Austrian FPO for a short period in 2022. The FVD was later suspended from the ID in October 2022 and later quit the group after accusing ID of being anti-Russian. In 2024, the FVD lost its European Parliament representation, after its MEP had sat as a Non-Inscrit. It joined the newly established Europe of Sovereign Nations party in 2024 led by Alternative for Germany. The FVD also has contacts with the Hungarian Our Homeland Movement, Moldovan Renastere, Republic Movement of Slovakia, the Serbian Party Oathkeepers and Alternative for Sweden, as well as Sanseitō of Japan.

=== Alleged ties to Russia ===
The FVD has also been criticized for alleged financial and political ties to Vladimir Putin with Dutch television show Zembla claiming to have unearthed WhatsApp communications between the party and someone Baudet describes as a Kremlin official. Baudet claimed the messages were a "playful exaggeration." Since the Russian invasion of Ukraine, the FVD's leadership have been condemned by both former party members and other Dutch political parties for supporting the invasion, taking an overtly pro-Putin stance and blaming the West for the war. In October 2022, the party's remaining MEP was suspended (and subsequently resigned) from the Identity and Democracy European Parliamentary group after posting messages on Twitter praising Putin and expressing support for Russia in the war.
