= List of members of the European Parliament for the Netherlands, 2019–2024 =

During the parliamentary term from 2 July 2019 to 15 July 2024, 34 people were representatives of the Netherlands in the European Parliament. The Netherlands initially had 26 seats after the 2019 European Parliament elections, but was allocated three additional seats on 31 January 2020 after withdrawal of the United Kingdom from the European Union.

After the elections, the national parties joined political groups in the European Parliament. The largest delegation, the Labour Party (PvdA, 6 seats), joined the Progressive Alliance of Socialists and Democrats (S&D). People's Party for Freedom and Democracy (VVD, 4 seats) and Democrats 66 (D66, 2 seats) both joined Renew. Christian Democratic Appeal (CDA, 4 seats), 50Plus (50+, 1 seat) and Christian Union (CU, 1 seat) joined the European People's Party Group (EPP). Forum for Democracy (FvD, 3 seats) and Reformed Political Party (SGP, 1 seat) joined European Conservatives and Reformists Group (ECR). GroenLinks (GL, 3 seats) joined Greens–European Free Alliance (Greens-EFA) and Party for the Animals (PvdD, 1 seat) joined The Left in the European Parliament (EUL/NGL).

After Brexit, the candidate lists of FvD and VVD were allocated another seat, while the Party for Freedom (PVV) gained their first seat and joined Identity and Democracy (ID). However, the next candidate awarded the FvD seat, Dorien Rookmaker, had left the party and joined the Otten Group (GO). She remained unaffiliated with an EP Group until joining ECR in December 2021, after having left GO in June 2020 and founding her own party More Direct Democracy in September 2021. The other three representatives of FvD left the party in December 2020 and joined JA21, with Rob Rooken and Rob Roos leaving JA21 and continuing as independent in August 2023. Meanwhile, the PVV's only representative Marcel de Graaff switched to FvD in January 2022 and in October 2022 left ID. Toine Manders left 50+ in June 2020 and joined CDA. Both members of D66 left as well; Sophie in 't Veld continued as independent in June 2023 and joined Volt Netherlands in May 2024, while Samira Rafaela left the party the week before the end of the term.

== List ==
Name	National party	EP Group (Note: Short periods as Non-Inscrits at the start of a term are excluded)	Start date (Note: Limited to this term)	End date	Ref.
Malik Azmani	VVD	Renew	2 July 2019	15 July 2024	
Tom Berendsen	CDA	EPP	2 July 2019	15 July 2024	
Mohammed Chahim	PvdA	S&D	2 July 2019	15 July 2024	
Peter van Dalen	CU	EPP	2 July 2019	3 September 2023	
Bas Eickhout	GL	Gr/EFA	2 July 2019	15 July 2024	
Derk Jan Eppink	FvD (Note: Until 19 December 2020)	ECR	2 July 2019	30 March 2021 (Note: Left to join the House of Representatives)	
Derk Jan Eppink	JA21 (Note: From 20 December 2020)	ECR	2 July 2019	30 March 2021	
Marcel de Graaff	PVV (Note: Until 19 January 2022)	ID (Note: Until 23 October 2022)	1 February 2020 (Note: Started on 12 February, but was appointed retroactively)	15 July 2024	
Marcel de Graaff	FvD (Note: Since 20 January 2022)	ID	1 February 2020	15 July 2024	
Marcel de Graaff	FvD	NI (Note: From 24 October 2022)	1 February 2020	15 July 2024	
Bart Groothuis	VVD	Renew	1 February 2020	15 July 2024	
Anja Haga	CU	EPP	5 September 2023	15 July 2024	
Anja Hazekamp	PvdD	Left	2 July 2019	15 July 2024	
Michiel Hoogeveen	JA21	ECR	15 April 2021	15 July 2024	
Jan Huitema	VVD	Renew	2 July 2019	15 July 2024	
Agnes Jongerius	PvdA	S&D	2 July 2019	3 November 2022	
Esther de Lange	CDA	EPP	2 July 2019	15 February 2024	
Jeroen Lenaers	CDA	EPP	2 July 2019	15 July 2024	
Toine Manders	50+ (Note: Until 1 June 2020)	EPP	2 July 2019	15 July 2024	
Toine Manders	CDA (Note: Since 2 June 2020)	EPP	2 July 2019	15 July 2024	
Caroline Nagtegaal-van Doorn	VVD	Renew	2 July 2019	15 July 2024	
Henk Jan Ormel	CDA	EPP	27 February 2024	15 July 2024	
Kati Piri	PvdA	S&D	2 July 2019	30 March 2021	
Samira Rafaela	D66 (Note: Until 9 July 2024)	Renew	2 July 2019	15 July 2024	
Samira Rafaela	Indep. (Note: From 10 July 2024)	Renew	2 July 2019	15 July 2024	
Thijs Reuten	PvdA	S&D	15 April 2021	15 July 2024	
Catharina Rinzema	VVD	Renew	18 January 2022	15 July 2024	
Rob Rooken	FvD (Note: Until 19 December 2020)	ECR	2 July 2019	15 July 2024	
Rob Rooken	JA21 (Note: From 20 December 2020 until 25 August 2023)	ECR	2 July 2019	15 July 2024	
Rob Rooken	Indep. (Note: From 26 August 2023)	ECR	2 July 2019	15 July 2024	
Dorien Rookmaker	GO (Note: Until 27 June 2020)	NI (Note: Until 7 December 2021)	1 February 2020	15 July 2024	
Dorien Rookmaker	Indep. (Note: From 28 June 2020 until 24 September 2021)	NI	1 February 2020	15 July 2024	
Dorien Rookmaker	MDD (Note: From 25 September 2021)	NI	1 February 2020	15 July 2024	
Dorien Rookmaker	MDD	ECR (Note: Starting 8 December 2021)	1 February 2020	15 July 2024	
Rob Roos	FvD (Note: Until 19 December 2020)	ECR	2 July 2019	15 July 2024	
Rob Roos	JA21	ECR	2 July 2019	15 July 2024	
Rob Roos	Indep.	ECR	2 July 2019	15 July 2024	
Bert-Jan Ruissen	SGP	ECR	2 July 2019	15 July 2024	
Annie Schreijer-Pierik	CDA	EPP	2 July 2019	15 July 2024	
Liesje Schreinemacher	VVD	Renew	2 July 2019	9 January 2022 (Note: Left to join the fourth Rutte cabinet)	
Kim van Sparrentak	GL	Gr/EFA	2 July 2019	15 July 2024	
Tineke Strik	GL	Gr/EFA	2 July 2019	15 July 2024	
Paul Tang	PvdA	S&D	2 July 2019	15 July 2024	
Vera Tax	PvdA	S&D	2 July 2019	15 July 2024	
Sophie in 't Veld	D66 (Note: Until 15 June 2023)	Renew	2 July 2019	15 July 2024	
Sophie in 't Veld	Indep. (Note: Between 16 June 2023 and 14 May 2024)	Renew	2 July 2019	15 July 2024	
Sophie in 't Veld	Volt (Note: Since 15 May 2024)	Renew	2 July 2019	15 July 2024	
Lara Wolters	PvdA	S&D	9 July 2019	15 July 2024	

== See also ==
- 2019 European Parliament election
- List of members of the European Parliament, 2019–2024
