= Members of the European Parliament (2019–2024) =

Members serving in the European Parliament session from 2019 to 2024, following the 2019 election. For a full single list, see: List of members of the European Parliament 2019–2024.

== MEPs ==
- List of members of the European Parliament for Austria, 2019–2024
- List of members of the European Parliament for Belgium, 2019–2024
- List of members of the European Parliament for Bulgaria, 2019–2024
- List of members of the European Parliament for Croatia, 2019–2024
- List of members of the European Parliament for Cyprus, 2019–2024
- List of members of the European Parliament for the Czech Republic, 2019–2024
- List of members of the European Parliament for Denmark, 2019–2024
- List of members of the European Parliament for Estonia, 2019–2024
- List of members of the European Parliament for Finland, 2019–2024
- List of members of the European Parliament for France, 2019–2024
- List of members of the European Parliament for Germany, 2019–2024
- List of members of the European Parliament for Greece, 2019–2024
- List of members of the European Parliament for Hungary, 2019–2024
- List of members of the European Parliament for Ireland, 2019–2024
- List of members of the European Parliament for Italy, 2019–2024
- List of members of the European Parliament for Latvia, 2019–2024
- List of members of the European Parliament for Lithuania, 2019–2024
- List of members of the European Parliament for Luxembourg, 2019–2024
- List of members of the European Parliament for Malta, 2019–2024
- List of members of the European Parliament for the Netherlands, 2019–2024
- List of members of the European Parliament for Poland, 2019–2024
- List of members of the European Parliament for Portugal, 2019–2024
- List of members of the European Parliament for Romania, 2019–2024
- List of members of the European Parliament for Slovakia, 2019–2024
- List of members of the European Parliament for Slovenia, 2019–2024
- List of members of the European Parliament for Spain, 2019–2024
- List of members of the European Parliament for Sweden, 2019–2024
- List of members of the European Parliament for the United Kingdom, 2019–2020
