= List of Forum for Democracy members of the European Parliament =

Members of a Dutch political party in the EU Parliament

This is a list of all, including former members of the European Parliament for the Forum for Democracy (FvD).

== List ==
Name	Start	End	Ref.
Derk Jan Eppink	2 July 2019	4 December 2020	
Marcel de Graaff	20 January 2022	15 July 2024	
Rob Roos	2 July 2019	4 December 2020	
Rob Rooken	2 July 2019	4 December 2020	
