= Michiel Hoogeveen =

Dutch politician (born 1989)

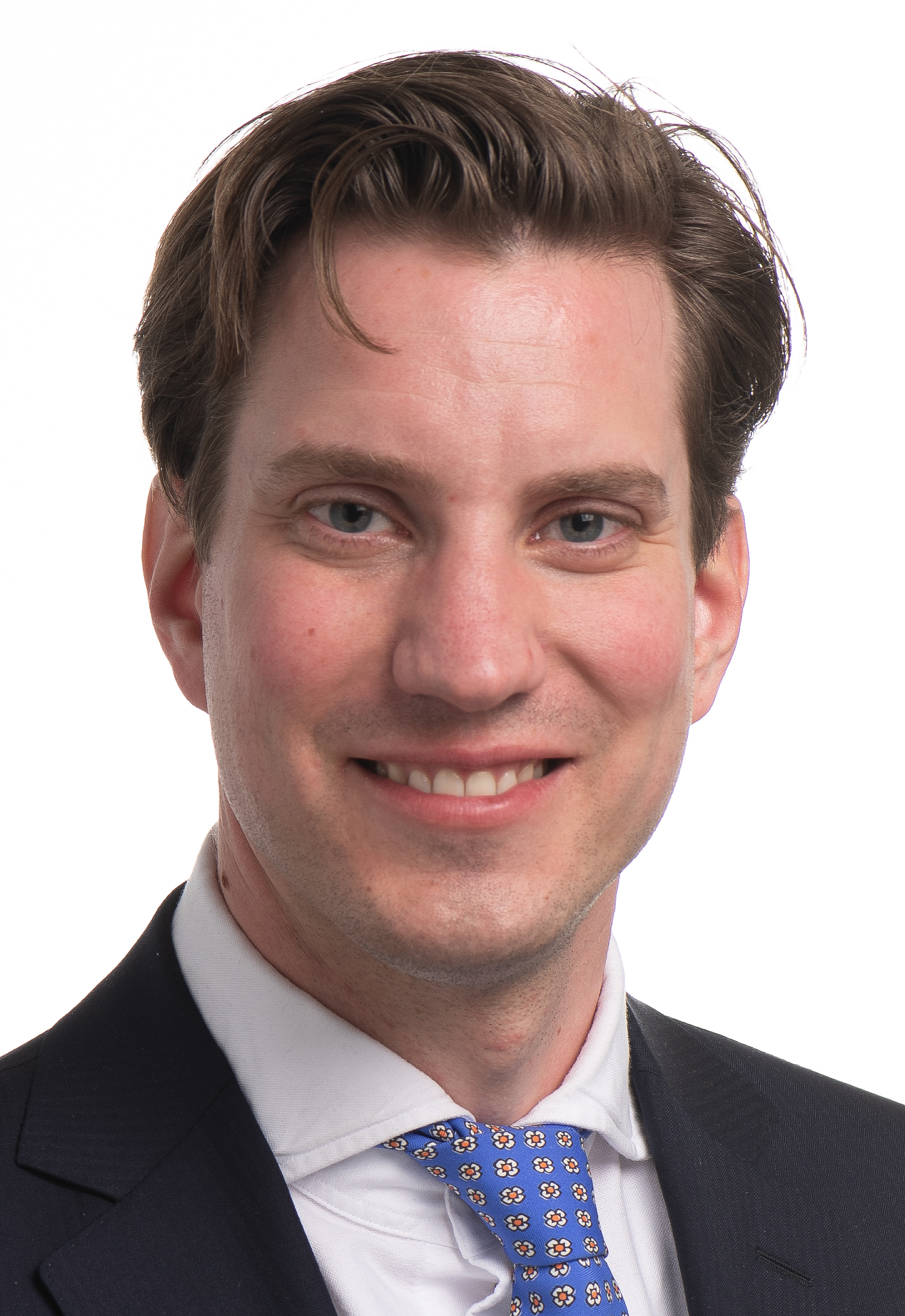
- Official portrait, 2021

Member of the House of Representatives
- Incumbent
- Assumed office 12 November 2025

Member of the European Parliament
- In office 15 April 2021 – 15 July 2024
- Preceded by: Derk Jan Eppink
- Parliamentary group: European Conservatives and Reformists
- Constituency: Netherlands

Member of the Provincial Council of South Holland
- In office 28 March 2019 – 19 May 2021
- Succeeded by: Hillebrand de Vries

Personal details
- Born: Michiel Pieter Hoogeveen; 6 July 1989 (age 37) Leiden, Netherlands
- Party: JA21 (since 2020)
- Other political affiliations: FvD (2016–2020)
- Education: The Hague University of Applied Sciences; Vrije Universiteit Amsterdam
- Occupation: Politician; banker; researcher

Michiel Pieter Hoogeveen (born 6 July 1989) is a Dutch politician serving as a member of the House of Representatives, representing the conservative JA21 party. A member of JA21 since 2020, he previously served in the European Parliament from 2021 to 2024 as part of the European Conservatives and Reformists Group. Before that, he was a member of the States of South Holland from 2019 to 2021 for Forum for Democracy (FVD). Hoogeveen began his career in the financial sector and also worked as a freelance researcher on North Korea.

== Early life and education ==
Hoogeveen was born and raised in the South Holland city of Leiden. He attended the secondary school Bonaventura College and went to The Hague University of Applied Sciences, earning a Bachelor of Business Administration degree in 2011. He then studied political science at Vrije Universiteit Amsterdam and graduated with a Master of Science degree in 2013 after completing his thesis about inter-Korean economic relations.

== Early career ==
Hoogeveen has worked at several banks including KAS Bank and he served as an independent researcher of North Korea at the same time. He traveled to the country three times between 2014 and 2017.

In a 2016 opinion piece, he called the policies of the West and the United Nations to stop North Korea's nuclear weapons program a failure, saying that the condemnations and sanctions following nuclear tests were not having any effect. He instead called for diplomatic talks with North Korea. A book by Hoogeveen called Het kluizenaarskoninkrijk: Over de opkomst en toekomst van Noord-Korea (The hermit kingdom: about the rise and future of North Korea) was published by Blue Tiger in 2018. He has told that the book was intended to stop the flood of disinformation, and he managed to paint a nuanced picture of North Korea "without glossing over Kim Jong-un's dictatorship" according to one review in Trends magazine. Hoogeveen has also served on the board of Pugwash Netherlands, an organization addressing weapons of mass destruction.

== Politics ==
He joined the right-wing conservative Forum for Democracy (FVD) party in 2016 after having attended a speech by party leader Thierry Baudet. Hoogeveen participated in the March 2019 provincial elections as the party's ninth candidate in South Holland and was elected to the States of South Holland. Two months later, he ran for Member of the European Parliament in the election as FVD's fifth candidate. He left his job as a risk consultant at KPMG to join the campaign. In 2019, Hoogeveen told in an interview on Dutch withdrawal from the European Union, that thinking on a European level is undermining the Dutch identity. He received 9,521 preference votes, but FVD's three seats were not sufficient for Hoogeveen to be elected. After the election, Hoogeveen became a press officer and political adviser of MEPs Derk Jan Eppink, Rob Roos, and Rob Rooken.

A crisis broke out within the party in November 2020 after newspaper Het Parool had written that antisemitic, Nazi, and homophobic thoughts were being held and expressed by members of Forum for Democracy's youth wing. An internal election was subsequently held to determine the future of Thierry Baudet. Hoogeveen called on members to vote him out. After Baudet had received support from a majority of the voters in December, Hoogeveen left the party. He decided to keep his seat, and he was joined by four more States of South Holland members of FVD. He later joined the splinter party JA21 and kept his position as press officer and political adviser, as Eppink, Roos, and Rooken had all joined that party as well.

He was JA21's ninth candidate in the 2021 general election, but he was not elected to the House of Representatives due to the party winning three seats. Hoogeveen personally received 337 preference votes. Derk Jan Eppink had been the third candidate and was thus elected to the House, leaving a vacant seat in the European Parliament for Hoogeveen to fill. He was installed on 15 April as part of the European Conservatives and Reformists political group and left the States of South Holland the following month. Hoogeveen became JA21's spokesperson for economic and monetary affairs, international trade, and gender equality, and he was on the following committees and delegations:

- Committee on Economic and Monetary Affairs (vice-chair since May 2021, member since April 2021)
- Delegation for relations with the United States (member since April 2021)
- Committee on International Trade (substitute member since April 2021)
- Delegation for relations with the Korean Peninsula (substitute member since April 2021)
- Committee on Women's Rights and Gender Equality (substitute member since April 2021)

In 2022, during a period of high inflation, Hoogeveen blamed high government spending and monetary policy. He represented the European Parliament in negotiations over reforms of European Long Term Investment Funds, and he became shadow rapporteur on a proposal by the European Commission to introduce a digital euro. Hoogeveen opposed the latter, calling it "a solution looking for a problem". He said it could cause confusion, undermining trust in the financial system, and he raised concerns about a possible bank run. He was rapporteur on a regulation mandating that money transfers between European banks take no longer than ten seconds. Besides, Hoogeveen continued to criticize the West's approach towards North Korea; he said denuclearization of North Korea would not be achieved through directly demanding it. He instead proposed to normalize relations such that they would feel safe to lower their defenses.

Hoogeveen ran for re-election in June 2024 as JA21's lead candidate. The party's vote share of 0.65% was insufficient to secure a seat in the European Parliament, and Hoogeveen's term ended on 15 July 2024.

== Personal life ==
While a Member of the European Parliament, Hoogeveen moved from Leiden to nearby Oegstgeest.

== Electoral history ==
Electoral history of Michiel Hoogeveen
Year	Body	Party	Pos.	Votes	Result		Ref.
Year	Body	Party	Pos.	Votes	Party seats	Individual	Ref.
2024	European Parliament	JA21	1	24,612	0	Lost	
2025	House of Representatives	JA21	4	1,543	9	Won	
