= Annie Schreijer-Pierik =

Dutch politician (born 1953)

Annie Schreijer-Pierik MEP
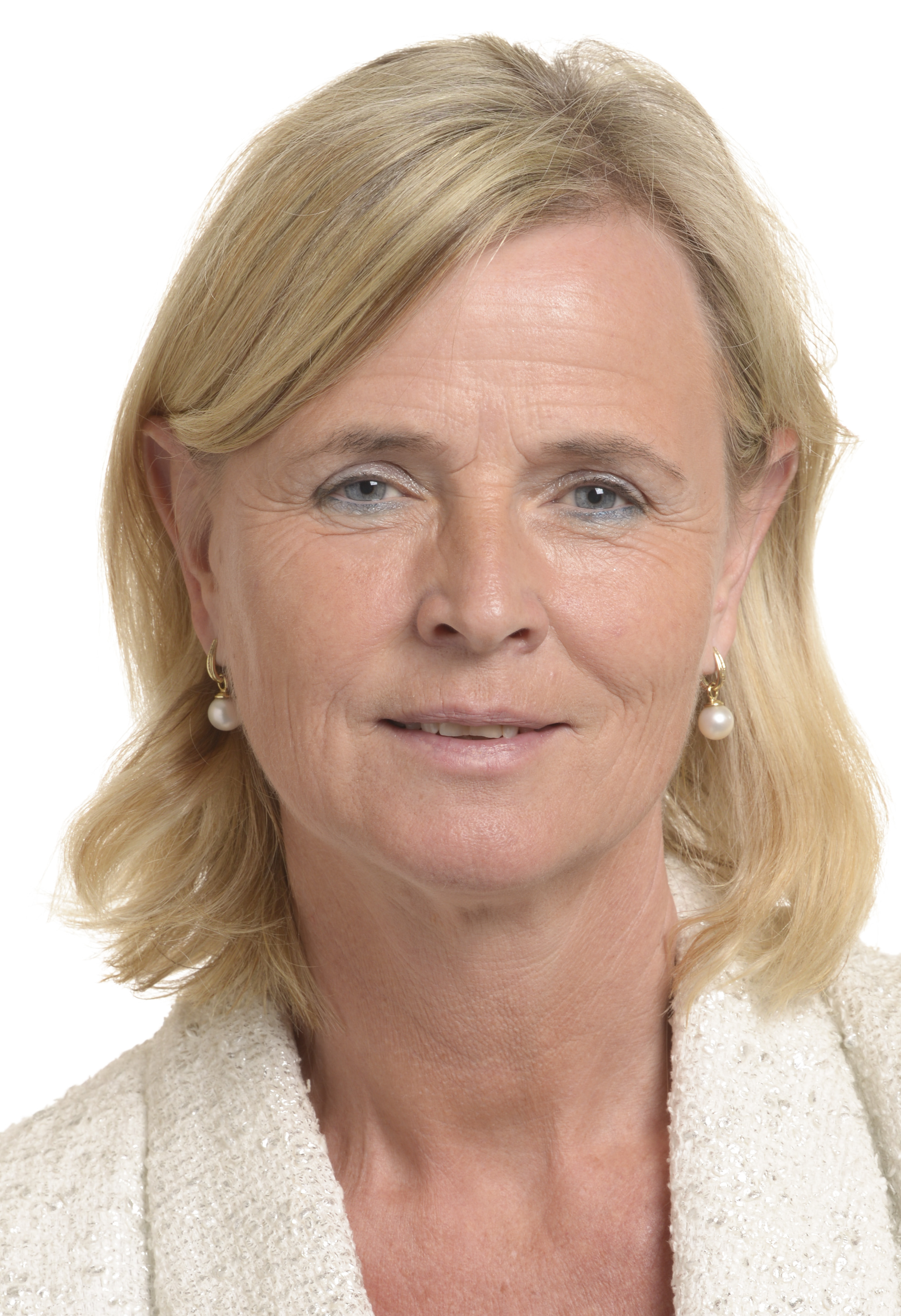

Member of the European Parliament
- In office 1 July 2014 – 15 July 2024
- Constituency: Netherlands

Member of the House of Representatives
- In office 19 May 1998 – 17 June 2010

Personal details
- Born: Johanna Maria Gertruida Schreijer-Pierik; 17 February 1953 (age 73) Diepenheim, Netherlands
- Party: Christian Democratic Appeal (1980–present)
- Other party: European People's Party
- Spouse: Jan Schreijer
- Children: 3
- Website: www.annie-schreijer.eu

Johanna Maria Gertruida "Annie" Schreijer-Pierik (born 17 February 1953) is a Dutch politician and former Member of the European Parliament (MEP) from the Netherlands. She is a member of the Christian Democratic Appeal, part of the European People's Party.

She runs a pig farm in the village Hengevelde, in the eastern part of the Netherlands, together with her family.

== Political career ==
Schreijer-Pierik became active for the Katholieke Plattelands Jongeren (Catholic rural youth) at age 17. She was elected to the municipal council of Ambt Delden in 1991. Four years later, she became a member of the council of the province Overijssel. From 1998 until 2010 Schreijer was a Member of the Dutch national parliament. As a Member of Parliament, she chaired the Agriculture Committee from 2004 until 2008.

=== Member of the European Parliament, 2014–present ===
Schreijer-Pierik was elected to the European Parliament in May 2014 as a CDA lijstduwer thanks to her 113,123 preference votes. A member of the European People's Party Group, she served on the Committee on the Environment, Public Health and Food Safety from 2014 until 2019 before moving to the Committee on Agriculture and Rural Development and the Committee on Fisheries. In addition to her committee assignments, Schreijer-Pierik is part of the Parliament's delegation to the ACP–EU Joint Parliamentary Assembly and the MEPs Against Cancer group.

She became less active in the European Parliament due to heart issues, and colleagues such as Bert-Jan Ruissen (SGP) often spoke on her behalf in debates. Schreijer-Pierik decided not to run for re-election in June 2024. In an interview with Nederlands Dagblad, she described her doubts about remaining a member of the CDA, saying that she had been unable to defend her party's agricultural compromises in the coalition agreement of the fourth Rutte cabinet. She had supported the switch to the Farmer–Citizen Movement (BBB) of her former assistant Sander Smit. Schreijer-Pierik said she desired a merger between the CDA, BBB, and NSC – the latter two having been founded by former CDA members in recent years. Her membership of the European Parliament ended on 15 July 2024.

== Personal life ==
Schreijer-Pierik married on 17 February 1974 in Diepenheim and has three children. She is a member of the Roman Catholic Church.
