= Vera Tax =

Dutch politician (born 1972)

Vera Tax MEP
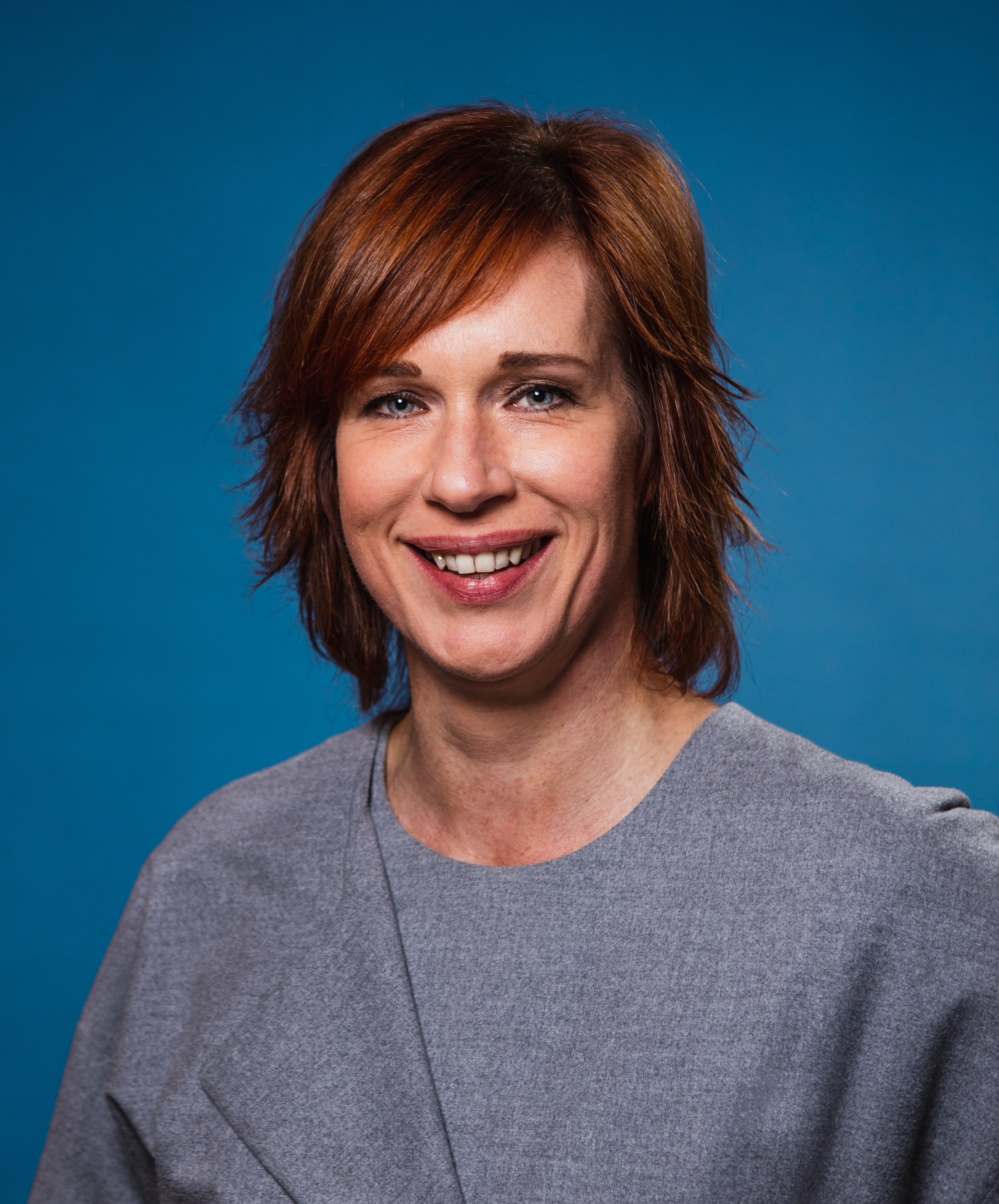
- Tax in 2020

Member of the European Parliament
- In office 2 July 2019 – 15 July 2024
- Constituency: Netherlands

Personal details
- Born: V. E. R. Tax; 8 February 1972 (age 54) Venlo, Netherlands
- Party: Labour Party

Vera E. R. Tax (born 8 February 1972) is a Dutch politician of the Labour Party (PvdA) who served as a Member of the European Parliament (MEP) between 2019 and 2024.

== Political career ==
Tax was elected to the European Parliament in May 2019. In parliament, she served on the Committee on Transport and Tourism. Starting in 2021, she was part of the Parliament's delegation to the Conference on the Future of Europe. In addition to her committee assignments, Tax was part of the Parliament's Delegation for relations with South Africa. She was also a member of the URBAN Intergroup and of the European Parliament Intergroup on LGBT Rights.

Tax did not run for re-election in June 2024, and her term ended on 15 July 2024.
