= List of members of the European Parliament for Ireland, 2019–2024 =

This is a list of the members of the European Parliament for Ireland elected at the 2019 European Parliament election. They served in the 2019 to 2024 session, but two of them did not take their seats until the reallocation of seats which took place when the MEPs elected for the United Kingdom vacated their seats on the implementation of Brexit on 31 January 2020.

== List ==
Name	Constituency	National party	EP group
Ciarán Cuffe	Dublin	Green	Greens/EFA
Frances Fitzgerald	Dublin	Fine Gael	EPP
Clare Daly	Dublin	Inds. 4 Change	GUE/NGL
Barry Andrews	Dublin	Fianna Fáil	RE
Mairead McGuinness (Note: Replaced during term, see table below for details.)	Midlands–North-West	Fine Gael	EPP
Luke 'Ming' Flanagan	Midlands–North-West	Independent	GUE/NGL
Maria Walsh	Midlands–North-West	Fine Gael	EPP
Matt Carthy	Midlands–North-West	Sinn Féin	GUE/NGL
Seán Kelly	South	Fine Gael	EPP
Billy Kelleher	South	Fianna Fáil	RE
Mick Wallace	South	Inds. 4 Change	GUE/NGL
Grace O'Sullivan	South	Green	Greens/EFA
Deirdre Clune	South	Fine Gael	EPP

== Changes ==
Party	Outgoing	Constituency	Reason	Date	Replacement
Sinn Féin	Matt Carthy	Midlands–North-West	Carthy elected to Dáil Éireann at the 2020 general election	8 February 2020	Chris MacManus
Fine Gael	Mairead McGuinness	Midlands–North-West	McGuinness appointed as European Commissioner	20 November 2020	Colm Markey

== See also ==
- Members of the European Parliament (2019–2024) – List by country
- List of members of the European Parliament (2019–2024) – Full alphabetical list
