= Willemien Koning-Hoeve =

Dutch politician

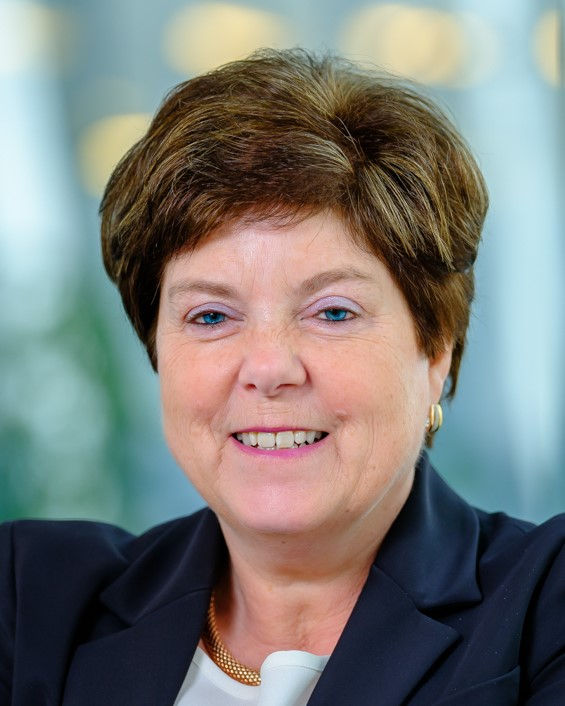

Member of the European Parliament
- Incumbent
- Assumed office 3 March 2026
- Preceded by: Tom Berendsen

Personal details
- Born: 1965 (age 60–61) Koedijk, Netherlands
- Party: Christian Democratic Appeal

Willemien Koning-Hoeve (born 1965) is a Dutch politician and agricultural entrepreneur, a member of the Christian Democratic Appeal (CDA). She became a Member of the European Parliament in 2026 after having been a member of the Provincial States of North Holland since 2015.

== Biography ==
Originally from Koedijk, Willemien Koning-Hoeve is a farmer and runs a dairy farm with her husband in Oudkarspel, the Netherlands.

She became involved very early in representing farmers and in agricultural organizations. In particular, she was president of the LTO Vrouw & Bedrijf organization between 2014 and 2022 and participated in the activities of the European federation of agricultural organizations Copa-Cogeca.

In 2018, she was appointed UN Women Representative for the Kingdom of the Netherlands.

== Political career ==
Willemien Koning-Hoeve was first active at the local level as a municipal councillor in the former municipality of Langedijk.

In March 2015, she was elected as a member of the Provincial States of North Holland for the CDA. There she worked particularly on issues of agriculture, land use planning, water management and nature.

In the 2024 European Parliament election, she was on the CDA list. In 2026, she enters the European Parliament to replace Tom Berendsen, who was appointed Minister of Foreign Affairs in the new Dutch government.

In the European Parliament, she is particularly interested in agricultural policies, food security and rural development.
