= Dorien Rookmaker =

Dutch politician (born 1964)

Dorien Rookmaker MEP
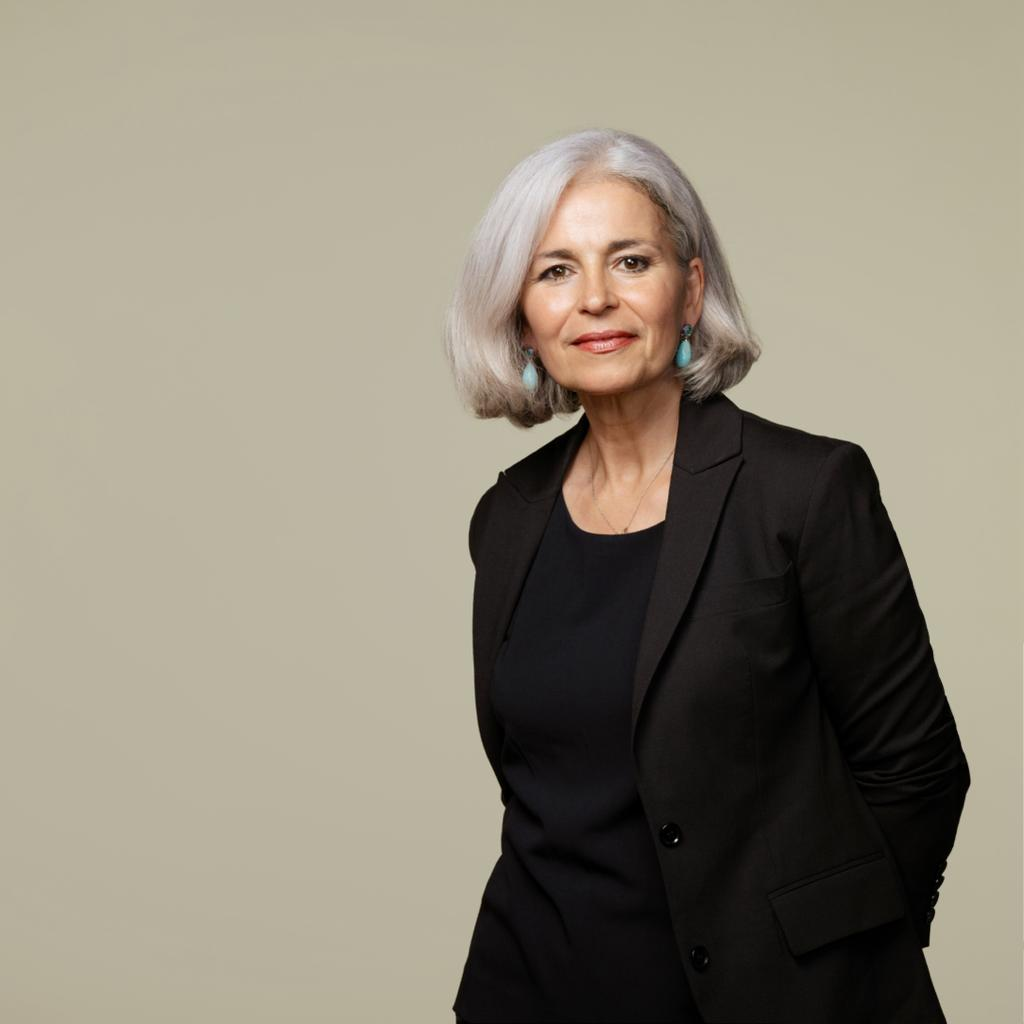
- Rookmaker in 2023

Member of the European Parliament for the Netherlands
- In office 12 February 2020 – 15 July 2024
- Parliamentary group: European Conservatives and Reformists (2021–2024); Non-Inscrits (2020–2021)

Vice President of the European Alliance for Freedom and Democracy
- Incumbent
- Assumed office 29 July 2020
- President: Mislav Kolakušić

Member of the Senate
- In office 11 June 2019 – 11 February 2020
- Parliamentary group: Otten Group (2019–2020); Forum for Democracy (2019)

Personal details
- Born: 30 July 1964 (age 62) Petten, Netherlands
- Party: More Direct Democracy (since 2021); Belang van Nederland (since 2025)
- Other political affiliations: Otten Group (2019–2021); Forum for Democracy (2018–2019); Democrats 66 (1997–2018)
- Education: University of Groningen

Dorien Rookmaker (born 30 July 1964) is a Dutch politician of the More Direct Democracy (MDD) party, who served as a Member of the European Parliament between 2020 and 2024. Initially serving as a non-attached member, she joined the European Conservatives and Reformists in December 2021. She was a member of the Parliament's Committee on Transport and Tourism.

== Education and career ==
=== Education ===
Rookmaker attended Praedinius Gymnasium in Groningen, the Thorbecke Talentschool in Rotterdam and The Hague University of Applied Sciences. She obtained a propaedeutic degree in political science from Leiden University and her doctoral degree from the University of Groningen in Business Economics.

=== Career ===
Rookmaker worked in the financial sector, most recently as head of non-financial risk management at NN Group. She previously worked as a Risk Officer on the Executive Board of Nationale Nederlanden (S&I) and as Head of Risk & Compliance at ProRail. In these positions, she was committed to fighting fraud.

Before that, she worked as head of Risk Management at Achmea Bank and before that in various positions (including business advisor, secretary of the Project Portfolio Group and business analyst) at ABN AMRO. She started her career in 1994 at Randstad Outsourcing as an Intercedent.

=== Political career ===
Rookmaker was politically active for D66. For this party, she was a candidate in the 1994 parliamentary elections and in 2006 she became a municipal councillor in Groningen. In March 2019, Rookmaker was on the electoral list in the Provincial Council elections on behalf of Forum voor Democratie (FVD) in both Gelderland and South Holland.

On 11 June 2019, Rookmaker was installed as a member of the Senate for Forum voor Democratie (FVD). Rookmaker made an unsuccessful attempt to mediate between FVD and Upper House member Henk Otten, who had been expelled by the party. She joined the Otten group in the Upper House on 20 August 2019.[3] Like Jeroen de Vries, she no longer felt comfortable with the "boreal bullshit" of FVD party leader Thierry Baudet.[4] She also disagreed with the way Otten had been expelled,[2]

As the United Kingdom was leaving the European Union from 1 February 2020, known as Brexit, FVD was allocated an additional seat in the European Parliament. As Rookmaker was fourth on the FVD candidate list, she was first entitled to this "brexit seat" (despite her disbanded membership of FVD).[5] As of 10 February 2020, Rookmaker left the Upper House with a view to her appointment as MEP.[6] A day later, she was retroactively appointed to the European Parliament as of 1 February that year.[7] After her official papers were approved, she officially took her seat in the European Parliament on 12 February, where she was part of the group of non-attached members. She did so on behalf of Group Otten until 26 June 2020, after which she continued as an independent. Since 25 September 2021, she has been an MEP on behalf of her own party More Direct Democracy, and on 8 December 2021 she joined the group of the European Conservatives and Reformists. In the MEP, she is particularly committed to a European network of high-speed railway lines,[8] and is a member of the Committee on Economic and Monetary Affairs,[9] as well as a member of the Committee on Economic and Monetary Affairs.

In January 2024, she pleaded towards voters in NRC Handelsblad to ignore career politicians and look for individual candidates who she believes are "recognisable and authoritative",[10] with a view to the European Parliament elections in June the same year. Her goal with the More Direct Democracy party is to get more critical MEPs elected to the European Parliament.[11] The party has no party programme and no form of party discipline.[11] More Direct Democracy's vote share of 0.18% was insufficient to secure a seat, and Rookmaker's term as MEP ended on 15 July 2024.

== Positions ==
During proceedings concerning the removal of the European Parliament's vice-president suspected of corruption, Eva Kaili from her post, Rookmaker abstained from voting in December 2022, along with two other MEPs.[12] The reason for abstaining is that a person is judged innocent until proven guilty. The information available was insufficient for the latter, according to Rookmaker.[12]

Rookmaker is in favour of a high-speed train between Amsterdam and Berlin, in fact also between all European capitals,[13] and made a Christmas greeting on that theme in December 2023.[14]

== Electoral history ==
Electoral history of Dorien Rookmaker
Year	Body	Party	Pos.	Votes	Result		Ref.
Year	Body	Party	Pos.	Votes	Party seats	Individual	Ref.
1994	House of Representatives	Democrats 66	25 (Note: Only in the electoral districts of Groningen, Leeuwarden, Assen, Zwolle, and Arnhem.)	1,107	24	Lost	
2019	Senate	Forum for Democracy	6	0	12	Won	
2019	European Parliament	Forum for Democracy	4	15,403	3	Lost (Note: Rookmaker was appointed to the body later during the term due to a vacancy.)	
2024	European Parliament	More Direct Democracy	1	3,712	0	Lost	
2025	House of Representatives	Belang van Nederland	2	1,553	0	Lost	
