= Leonie van Bladel =

Dutch journalist and politician (born 1939)

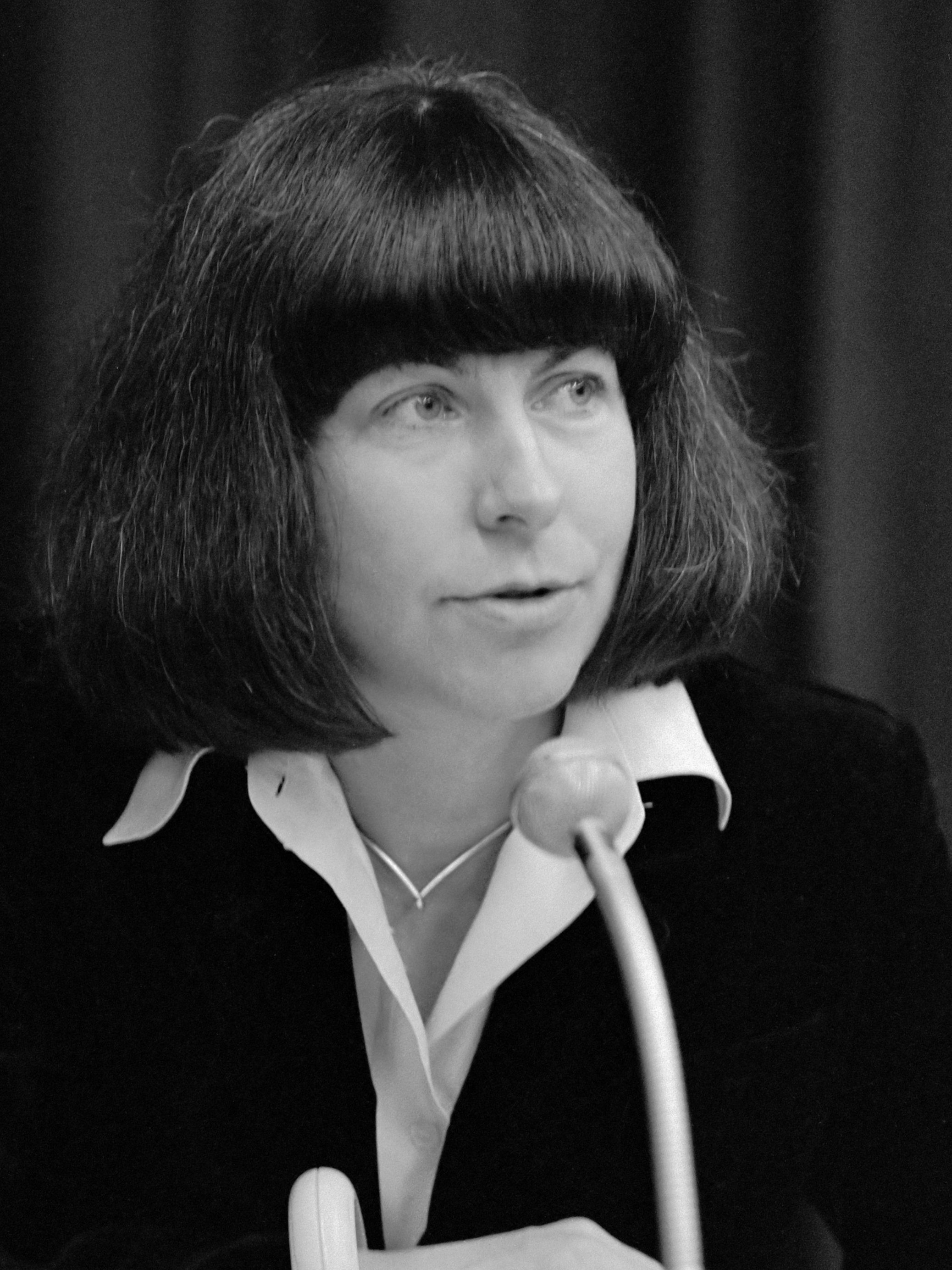
- Van Bladel in 1979

Member of the European Parliament
- In office 1994–1999

Personal details
- Born: Leonie Godefrieda Louisa van Bladel; 22 June 1939 (age 86) Utrecht, Netherlands
- Party: PvdA (until 1996)
- Occupation: Journalist; presenter; politician

Leonie Godefrieda Louisa van Bladel (born 22 June 1939) is a Dutch former politician, presenter, and journalist.

== Career ==
Van Bladel attended the Bonifacius Lyceum in Utrecht. In addition to her work as a secretary, first at the Institute for Art History in Utrecht and later at the NTS Journaal, she took a course at the Press Institute in Amsterdam. In 1965 she did a screen test for broadcaster together with Sonja Barend. She did not get this job and after this she started working at VPRO as a program director. In 1966 she was allowed to fill in as an announcer and she continued to do so until 1973, for both VPRO and IKOR. Van Bladel was also active as a freelance journalist and worked as a reporter and presenter on the radio programs Blik op de Wereld (NOS), In de Rooie Haan (VARA) and on television for the current affairs program Kenmerk (IKON). She presented this column until 1983 and this is where her interest in developing countries, foreign policy and cultures developed. For the NOS, where she became a permanent employee in 1977, she was editor-in-chief of the radio programs Blik op de Derde Wereld ('View on the Third World'), Zorg en hoop ('Care and hope') and Tambú. In 1980 she became head of the Africa department at RNW.

In the 1970s, Van Bladel was chairwoman of the Evert Vermeer Foundation. Through Felix Rottenberg she was put on the Labour Party's electoral list for the 1994 European Parliament elections. In 1996, an argument with fellow party member Hedy d'Ancona, with whom she shared an apartment, was widely reported in the news. Van Bladel spoke of a scuffle and a shouting match, D'Ancona denied the former. In the media this was called the handtasjesoorlog ('handbag war'). Van Bladel left the Labour Party faction in September 1996 and joined the Union for Europe as an independent member. She soon became vice-chairman of that faction and worked together with the unrepresented elderly parties AOV and Union 55+. She was not eligible for election in 1999 and after this she was a board member of the Jewish Humanitarian Fund.
