= European Alliance for Freedom and Democracy =

Former populist European political alliance

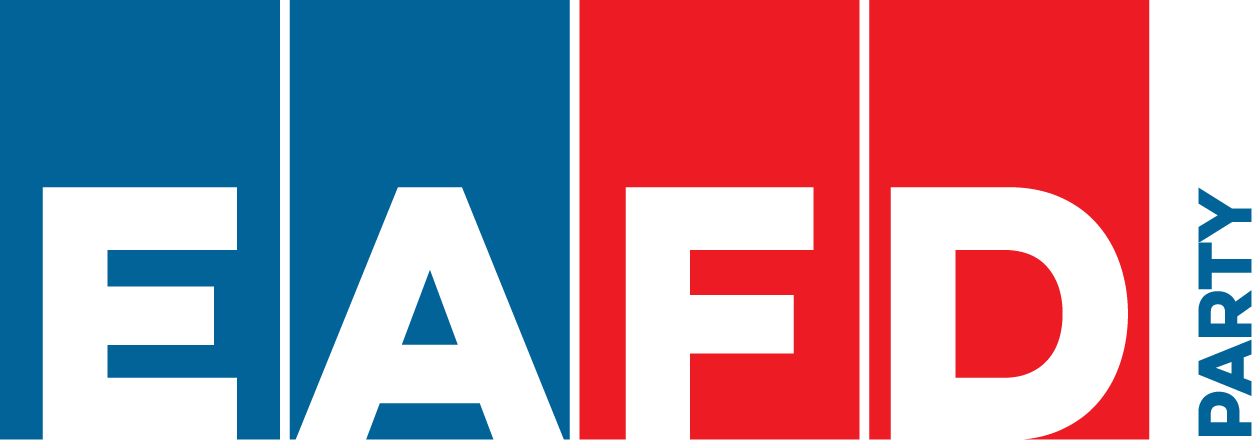
- President: Mislav Kolakušić (HR)
- Vice President: Dorien Rookmaker (NL)
- Founders: Mislav Kolakušić (HR); Dorien Rookmaker (NL); Ivan Vilibor Sinčić (HR); Miroslav Radačovský (SK)
- Founded: 29 July 2020
- Dissolved: August 2023
- Headquarters: B-1047 Bruxelles/Brussel
- Ideology: Populism
- European Parliament group: Non-Inscrits; European Conservatives and Reformists
- Colours: Blue; Red

Website
- eafdparty.eu

The European Alliance for Freedom and Democracy (EAFD, French: Alliance européenne pour la liberté et la démocratie, German: Europäische Allianz für Freiheit und Demokratie) was a populist European political alliance founded in summer 2020 by non-attached MEPs Mislav Kolakušić and Dorien Rookmaker.

According to the EAFD, its policy is based on the following principles: the rule of law and the fight against corruption both at the level of the EU and at the level of its member states, freedom of thought and speech as well as equality between citizens and between the member states of the EU.

The EAFD's application for entry in the register of the Authority for European Political Parties and European Political Foundations was rejected on 1 October 2020. This was justified by the fact that the member parties of the EAFD were not represented in a quarter of the member states, either in the European Parliament, in a national parliament, or in a regional assembly.

== Members ==
State	Name	abbr.	MEPs	National MPs	Regional parliaments
Austria	Team Carinthia; Team Kärnten	TK	0 / 19	0 / 183 0 / 62	3 / 440
Croatia	The Key of Croatia; Ključ Hrvatske	KH	1 / 12	0 / 151	
Croatia	Direct member Mislav Kolakušić		1 / 12		
Cyprus	Solidarity Movement; Κίνημα Αλληλεγγύη	KA	0 / 6	0 / 56	12 / 478
Greece	Agricultural Livestock Party of Greece; Αγροτικό Κτηνοτροφικό Κόμμα Ελλάδας	AKKEL	0 / 21	0 / 300	
Italy	Italian Animalist Party; Partito Animalista Italiano	PAI	0 / 76	0 / 315 0 / 630	2 / 878
Netherlands	More Direct Democracy; Meer Directe Democratie	MDD	1 / 29	0 / 75 0 / 150	
Poland	Kukiz'15; Kukiz’15	K’15	0 / 52	0 / 100 4 / 460	
Slovakia	Slovak PATRIOT; Slovenský PATRIOT	PATRIOT	1 / 14	0 / 150	
Sweden	Healthcare Party in Värmland; Sjukvårdspartiet i Värmland	SiV	0 / 21	0 / 349	4 / 598
Sweden	Security Party; Trygghetspartiet	TP	0 / 21	0 / 349	

=== Former members ===
- Italy 10 Times Better
- Portugal Together for the People

== Leadership ==
- President: Mislav Kolakušić
- Vice President and Treasurer: Dorien Rookmaker
