= Sander Smit =

Dutch politician (born 1985)

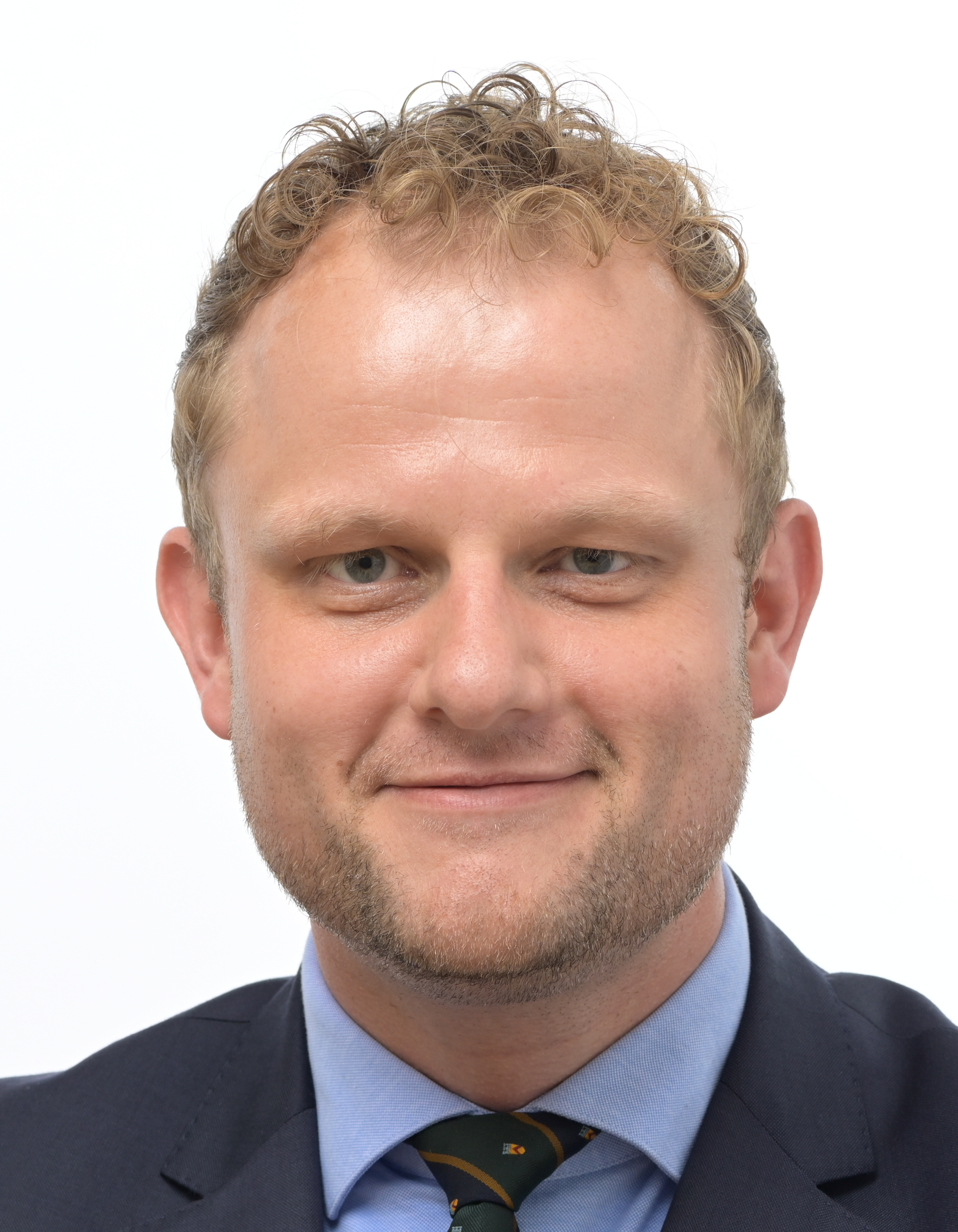
- Official portrait, 2024

Member of the European Parliament
- Incumbent
- Assumed office 16 July 2024
- Parliamentary group: European People's Party Group
- Constituency: Netherlands

Personal details
- Born: 29 July 1985 (age 40) Goor, Netherlands
- Party: BBB (since 2022)
- Other party: CDA (until 2022)

Sander Smit (Dutch: [ˈsɑndər ˈsmɪt]; born 29 July 1985) is a Dutch politician of the Farmer–Citizen Movement (BBB), who has been a Member of the European Parliament (MEP) since 2024.

== Political career ==
Smit was a member of the Hof van Twente Municipal Council on behalf of the Christian Democratic Appeal (CDA), and he worked for eight years as policy advisor of MEP Annie Schreijer-Pierik. He later joined the Farmer–Citizen Movement (BBB), founded by former CDA member Caroline van der Plas in 2019, and he was the party’s lead candidate in the June 2024 European Parliament election. He positioned his party politically between the European People's Party and the European Conservatives and Reformists, and he said he intended to cooperate with both. BBB won two seats, joining the European People's Party Group, and Smit was elected to the European Parliament.

=== European Parliament committees ===
- Committee on Fisheries (vice-chair)
- Delegation to the EU–Russia Parliamentary Cooperation Committee
- Committee on the Environment, Public Health and Food Safety
- Committee on Civil Liberties, Justice and Home Affairs (substitute)
- Delegation for relations with Israel (substitute)

== Electoral history ==
Electoral history of Sander Smit
| Year | Body | Party | Pos. | Votes | Result | | Ref. |
| Year | Body | Party | Pos. | Votes | Party seats | Individual | Ref. |
|---|---|---|---|---|---|---|---|
| 2024 | European Parliament | Farmer–Citizen Movement | 1 | 218,669 | 2 | Won | |
