= Samira Rafaela =

Dutch politician (born 1989)

Samira Rafaela MEP
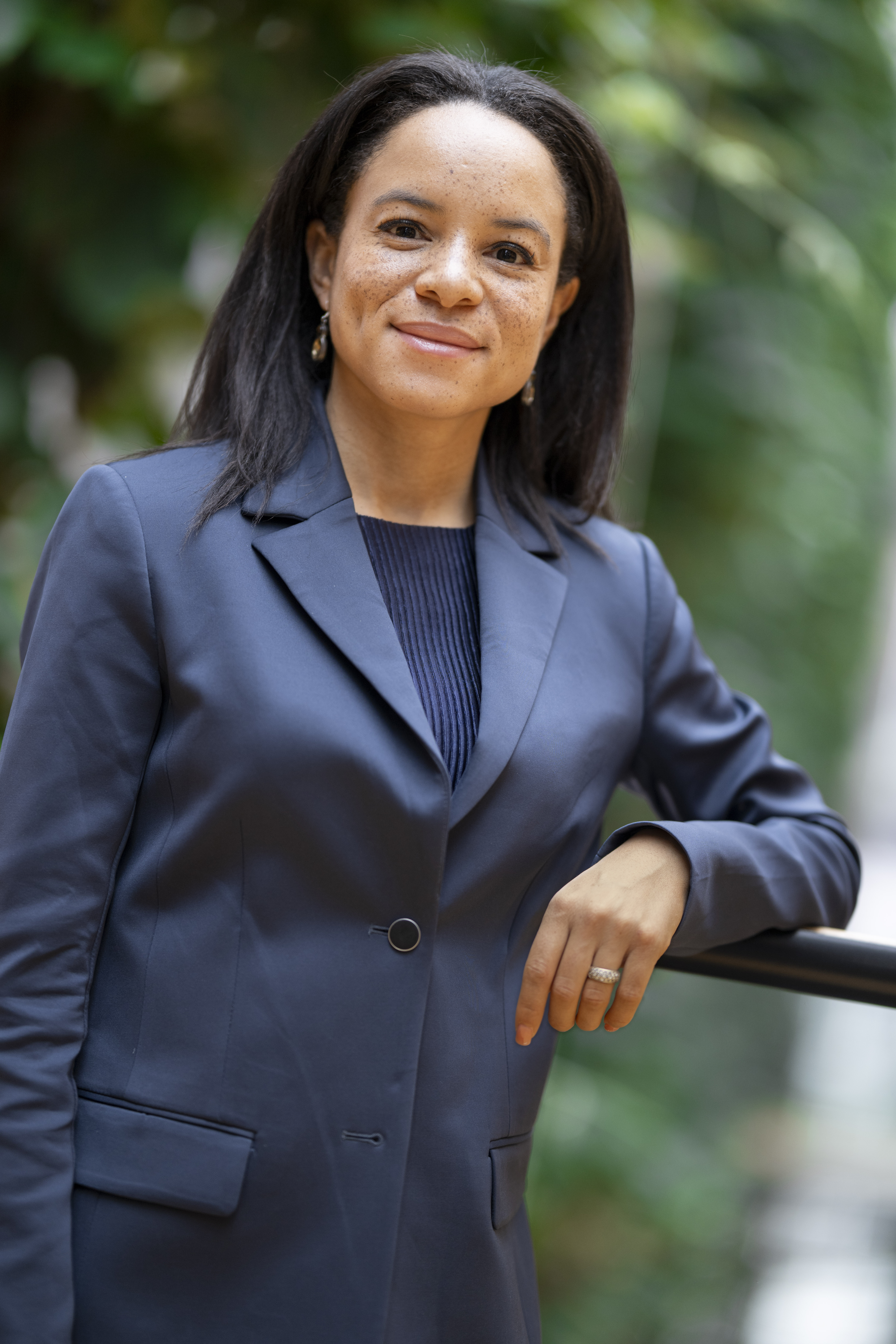
- Samira Rafaela at the European Parliament in Strasbourg (2024)

Member of the European Parliament for the Netherlands
- In office 2 July 2019 – 15 July 2024
- Parliamentary group: Renew Europe

Personal details
- Born: 11 February 1989 (age 37) Zoetermeer, Netherlands
- Party: Democrats 66
- Education: Leiden University

Samira Rafaela (born 11 February 1989) is a Dutch politician of Democrats 66. She served as a Member of the European Parliament between 2019 and 2024, and she was also a member of the Young Democrats.

== Early life ==
Rafaela grew up with her Jewish Dutch-Curaçaoan mother in Uitgeest. Her father was of Ghanaian-Nigerian descent and a practicing Muslim. She considers herself a progressive, liberal, feminist Muslim.

She attended Bonhoeffer College in Castricum and studied public administration at Leiden University. She did research on the causes of radicalization and terrorism and obtained a master's degree in Crisis and Security Management. She worked as a policy maker and administrative advisor for the municipality of Amsterdam. In 2016, she transferred to the Police Netherlands, where she acted as project leader for inclusion. As a social entrepreneur, she worked in Africa with young talent and as an international trainer and speaker on women's participation, leadership, security and inclusion.

Samira Rafaela met President Barack Obama in 2019 when she was selected for his Townhall meeting in Berlin with 300 young leaders from Europe.

== Political career ==
Samira Rafaela was elected a Member of the European Parliament in the 2019 election, making her the first Dutch MEP with Afro-Caribbean roots. She has been a member of the Committee on International Trade (since 2019), the Committee on Women's Rights and Gender Equality (since 2019) and the Committee on Employment and Social Affairs (since 2021).

In 2019, Rafaela delivered the prestigious Martin Luther King speech at the Vrije Universiteit Amsterdam, where she spoke about the role of activists and politicians in society. Rafaela stated that if politicians want to bring about change, they should adopt a bit of an activist mindset as well.

Rafaela was the Co-Chair of the Anti-Racism and Diversity Intergroup in the European Parliament. In 2020, she called for a U.S.-EU joint action plan against racism, which included dedicated funding and support for civil society initiatives.

In 2020, Rafaela was named one of the "20 MEPs to Watch in 2020" by Politico, highlighting her as a symbol of a new trade direction within the European Parliament.

In February 2021, Samira Rafaela requested that the European Commission initiate legal proceedings against the government of The Netherlands. She argued that the childcare benefits scandal involved institutional racism, which violated European laws and treaties.

In 2023, Rafaela succeeded in securing a debate in the European Parliament about the childcare benefits scandal. The debate highlighted the need for ethical use of algorithms, using the scandal as an example of the risks associated with AI replacing human decision-making. During the debate, EU Commissioner Helena Dalli committed to monitoring the remediation process for the victims.

In 2024, Samira Rafaela was shortlisted and nominated for the Youth Champion of the Mandate Awards for her work on eliminating inequalities, fostering sustainable trade policies, and promoting an inclusive labour market. In the same year, Samira Rafaela was listed among the Top 100 most politically influential Members of the European Parliament out of 705 members. She was also ranked in the top 20 for Social Policy and top 20 for Trade as the most influential Members throughout the mandate of 2019–2024. Rafaela achieved the best score among Dutch Members of the European Parliament in the mandate of 2019–2024 due to her high performance as a Rapporteur.

Rafaela was the lead negotiator for the EU Pay Transparency directive. She was also the Rapporteur for the Forced Labour Regulation, an EU law that will ban products made from forced labour from the EU single market.

Samira Rafaela served as the Rapporteur for the Corporate Sustainability and Due Diligence Directive in the Employment and Social Affairs Committee. Rafaela was also the Rapporteur for the EU-Chile Trade Agreement, which included the first EU Gender and Trade chapter.

In addition, Rafaela worked on a plan of actions to combat anti-rights movements in Europe. She stated that anti-rights movements and the continuous misuse of EU public funds by anti-democratic actors are sometimes linked to foreign interference and are becoming increasingly common in institutions.

In addition to her committee assignments, Rafaela was part of the Parliament's delegations to the Euro-Latin American Parliamentary Assembly (EuroLat) and to the EU–Chile Joint Parliamentary Committee. She also co-chaired the European Parliament Anti-Racism and Diversity Intergroup and was a member of the European Parliament Intergroup on Artificial Intelligence and Digital and the European Parliament Intergroup on Disability.

In 2023, Rafaela – together with Malin Björk and Evin Incir – alleged in a letter to the President of the European Parliament Roberta Metsola that their fellow MEPs Anders Vistisen, Isabella Adinolfi and Cristian Terheș breached Parliament's rules on offensive language during a debate on the ratification of the 2011 Istanbul convention against gender-based violence and urged Metsola to investigate.

In 2022, an internal investigation by D66 issued Samira Rafaela a warning following complaints from former co-workers. However, in August of that same year, an independent dispute committee found the investigation to be flawed and declared the warning entirely unjustified, fully exonerating Rafaela.

In 2023, Rafaela alerted the European Commission to "very worrying practices" by major social media platforms, alleging that these platforms were secretly hiding certain posts and content they deemed incompatible with their own opinions.

== Women's rights and health advocacy ==
Rafaela served as the Renew Europe Rapporteur for the EU Women on Boards Directive, where she introduced a 'faming list' to give positive recognition to companies promoting gender equality. Rafaela also addressed the issue of the 'pink tax', urging the European Commission to amend EU legislation to prevent women and girls from paying more than men for the same products.

In 2022, Samira Rafaela, along with other Members of the European Parliament, urged the European Commission to promote greater gender balance in the EU health strategy. In 2024, Rafaela launched the initiative Let's Talk About Our Bodies and presented a manifesto to EU Commissioner Helena Dalli, advocating for increased research and development in women's health. In 2022, Rafaela spoke publicly about her personal experiences with menstrual health and fibroids, highlighting the need for greater awareness among women and the medical community.

== Civic engagement and outreach ==
In 2023, Rafaela launched Europe to the Streets, a project aimed at bringing European politics closer to citizens.

== 2024 European Parliament election ==
In 2023, Samira Rafaela received a positive recommendation from an internal D66 committee, which included senior party leaders such as Sigrid Kaag, the current UN Humanitarian Coordinator for Gaza. The committee advised that she run as the lead candidate for D66 in the 2024 European elections.

Rafaela ultimately lost the internal election after four rounds, receiving 41.5% of the votes. On 21 December 2023, she announced she would not seek re-election in the 2024 European Parliament election. Her term ended on 15 July 2024.

Rafaela is now a visiting fellow at Cornell University Global Labor Institute where she works on global labor governance.

== Recognition ==
- 2020 – International Woman of the Year, awarded by Harper's Bazaar
- 2023 – Changemaker, awarded by Rise and Lead Women
