= More Direct Democracy =

More Direct Democracy Meer Directe Democratie
- Abbreviation: MDD
- Leader: Dorien Rookmaker
- Founded: 2021
- Ideology: Direct democracy
- Political position: Syncretic
- European affiliation: European Alliance for Freedom and Democracy (2021-2023)
- European Parliament group: European Conservatives and Reformists Group (2021-2024)
- Colors: Blue; Dark blue Gold

Website
- meerdirectedemocratie.nl

More Direct Democracy (MDD) is a Dutch political party that was represented in the European Parliament between its establishment in 2021 and 2024.

The party was founded by Dorien Rookmaker, who became a member of the European Parliament in February 2020; initially representing Groep Otten, and then as an independent. Rookmaker is also the chair of the party. Starting on 8 December 8, 2021, the party was part of the faction of the European Conservatives and Reformists (ECH).

The party does not have its own election manifesto, but rather is a platform for representatives who each make their own choices. The party participated in the European elections in June 2024 and lost its seat.

MDD was a member of the European Alliance for Freedom and Democracy (EAFD), a European party that focused on anti-corruption and support for the rule of law. The EAFD was disbanded in 2023.

== Election results ==
=== European Parliament ===
Election	List	Votes	%	Seats	+/–	EP Group
2024	List	11,295	0.18	0 / 31	New	ECR

In the European Parliament elections, More Direct Democracy did not receive enough votes to secure a seat. Notably, Hester Bais, the second candidate on the list, received over 2,000 more votes than party leader Dorien Rookmaker.
