= List of members of the European Parliament for Estonia, 2019–2024 =

This is a list of members of the European Parliament for Estonia in the 2019 to 2024 session.

See 2019 European Parliament election in Estonia for further information on these elections in Estonia.

== List ==
- Marina Kaljurand (Social Democratic Party)
- Sven Mikser (Social Democratic Party)
- Andrus Ansip (Estonian Reform Party)
- Urmas Paet (Estonian Reform Party)
- Jana Toom (Estonian Centre Party)
- Jaak Madison (Conservative People's Party of Estonia)
- Riho Terras (Isamaa)
