= Tom Berendsen =

Dutch politician (born 1983)

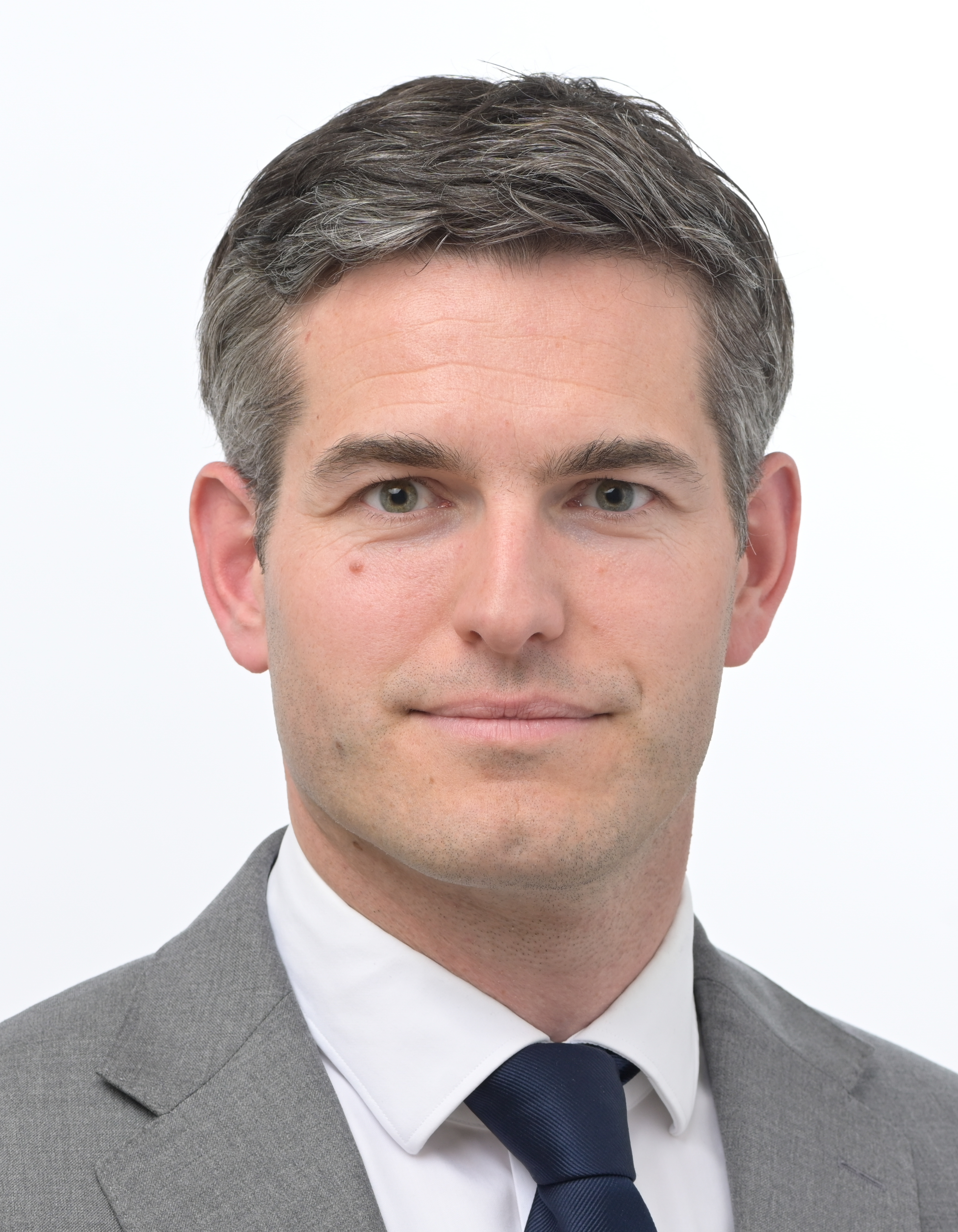
- Official portrait, 2024

Minister of Foreign Affairs
- Incumbent
- Assumed office 23 February 2026
- Prime Minister: Rob Jetten
- Preceded by: David van Weel

Leader of the Christian Democratic Appeal in the European Parliament
- In office 16 July 2024 – 22 February 2026
- Preceded by: Jeroen Lenaers

Member of the European Parliament
- In office 2 July 2019 – 22 February 2026
- Succeeded by: Willemien Koning-Hoeve
- Constituency: Netherlands

Personal details
- Born: Tom Berend Willem Berendsen; 11 April 1983 (age 43) Breda, Netherlands
- Party: Christian Democratic Appeal
- Spouse: Aniek Marissink
- Children: 2
- Education: Tilburg University

Tom Berend Willem Berendsen (born 11 April 1983) is a Dutch politician who has served as Minister of Foreign Affairs in the Jetten cabinet since 2026. From 2019 until his appointment to the government he served as a Member of the European Parliament (MEP). He is a member of the Christian Democratic Appeal (CDA).

== Early life and education ==
Born in Breda, Berendsen studied public administration at Tilburg University, as well as at KU Leuven as part of the Erasmus program, graduating with a master's degree in 2009.

From 2009 to 2015, he worked as an assistant for the Christian Democratic Appeal delegation within the European People's Party group in the European Parliament. Berendsen ran for the European Parliament at the 2014 election, but was not elected. Between 2015 and 2019, he worked as a sustainability adviser for PricewaterhouseCoopers in the Netherlands and completed a postgraduate program in energy and climate at the University of Antwerp in 2019.

== Political career ==
Berendsen took office as a Member of the European Parliament (MEP) following the 2019 election. In the European Parliament, he has served on the Committee on Industry, Research and Energy and the Committee on Regional Development. In addition to his committee assignments, he was part of the European Parliament's delegation for relations to the Pan-African Parliament. He was also a member of the URBAN Intergroup. As an MEP, Berendsen called for an end to Chinese interference in critical European infrastructure, such as Chinese investments in European ports and the use of Chinese scanning equipment at European airports. In 2023, he was appointed rapporteur for a European Port Strategy.

He ran for re-election in June 2024 as the CDA's lead candidate. As part of the campaign, Berendsen stressed the importance of the European defense industry during the Russian invasion of Ukraine, and he advocated for an environmentally-friendly industrial policy. The CDA secured three seats in the European Parliament, and Berendsen received a second term. He has subsequently served as his party's parliamentary leader.

=== Minister of Foreign Affairs ===
On February 7, 2026, Berendsen was put forward as the candidate for Minister of Foreign Affairs in the Jetten cabinet, being sworn in on February 23, 2026. On July 21, 2026, in a letter to the House of Representatives, Berendsen announced that, starting September 22, 2026, the cabinet would ban products originating from Israeli-occupied territories from entering the Netherlands for a period of at least three years.

== Personal life ==
Berendsen is married to Aniek Marissink since 2018, and has two children. He is a supporter of football club NAC Breda.

== Electoral history ==
Electoral history of Tom Berendsen
| Year | Body | Party | Pos. | Votes | Result | | Ref. |
| Year | Body | Party | Pos. | Votes | Party seats | Individual | Ref. |
|---|---|---|---|---|---|---|---|
| 2024 | European Parliament | Christian Democratic Appeal | 1 | 366,454 | 3 | Won | |
| 2026 | Breda Municipal Council | Christian Democratic Appeal | 39 (Note: Berendsen participated as lijstduwer.) | 68 | 6 | Lost | |

== Honours ==
- Japan: Grand Cordon of the Order of the Rising Sun (17 June 2026)

== Notes ==
Political offices
| Preceded by David van Weel | Minister of Foreign Affairs; 2026–present | Incumbent |
