= Mislav Kolakušić =

Croatian lawyer and politician

Mislav Kolakušić MEP
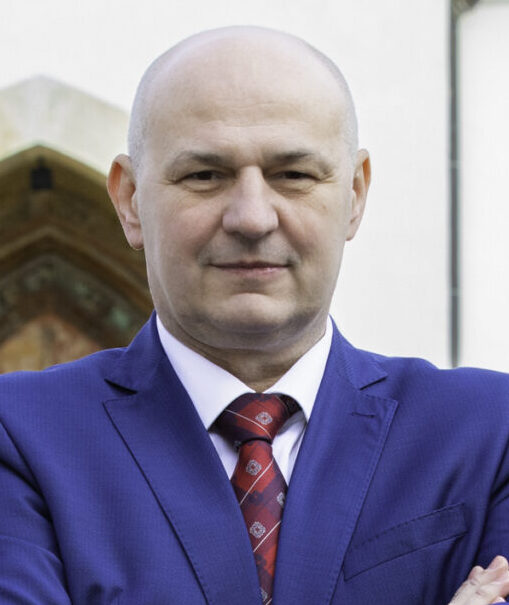

Member of the European Parliament for Croatia
- In office 2 July 2019 – 16 July 2024

Personal details
- Born: 15 September 1969 (age 57) Zagreb, SR Croatia, SFR Yugoslavia (modern Croatia)
- Party: Law and Justice (2024–present)
- Other political affiliations: Independent (2019–2020, 2023–2024); EAFD (2020–2023)
- Education: University of Zagreb
- Occupation: Lawyer; judge; politician
- A: European affiliation

Mislav Kolakušić (born 15 September 1969) is a Croatian lawyer and politician who was a Member of the European Parliament for Croatia from 2 July 2019 to 16 July 2024, having been elected to the position at the 2019 election as an independent. Previously, he served as a judge at the Zagreb Commercial Court.

== Early life and education ==
Kolakušić was born in Zagreb, Croatia, where he finished elementary and high school. Kolakušić graduated law from the University of Zagreb in 1997. He passed the bar exam in 2000.

== Professional career ==
Kolakušić worked as a court trainee at the Commercial Court in Zagreb and at the Municipal and County Courts in Zagreb from 1998 to 2000. From 2001 to 2005, Kolakušić worked on the working-financial department of the Administrative Court of the Republic of Croatia, and from 2005 to 2011 as a senior counsel at the same court. Since 2011, he has been a judge at the Zagreb Commercial Court.

Kolakušić also served as the spokesperson of the High Administrative Court of the Republic of Croatia from 2009 to 2011, as well as the Labor Relations Interlocutor of the same court from 2005 to 2011. He was the president of the Croatian Association of Judicial Advisers and Trainees from 2006 to 2011. In 2017, he was a candidate for a judge at the Constitutional Court of Croatia, but was not elected.

== Political career ==
=== 9th European Parliament ===
At the European Parliament election in Croatia in May 2019, Kolakušić was elected to the European Parliament, as an independent. Kolakušić is a member of the Parliament Committee on Budgets and the Committee on Legal Affairs, and a substitute of the Committee on Civil Liberties, Justice and Home Affairs. From 2019 to 2022, Kolakušić voted with the winning side in 14.8% of votes, the lowest of all MEPs.

In January 2022, Kolakušić addressed French President Emmanuel Macron during a legislative session, arguing that vaccination must remain a choice, and compared vaccine mandates with capital punishment, claiming that tens of thousands had died from it citing data from the European Medicines Agency. The European Medicines Agency said in a response that the cited data was a public, self-reported database of suspected side effects which did not report deaths and would require further scientific investigation to find any causal link between the reports and the COVID-19 vaccine.

In March 2022, Kolakušić gave a speech at the European Parliament targeting Canadian Prime Minister Justin Trudeau's response to protests against COVID-19 vaccine mandates, saying that Canada once stood for civil rights but now resembled more like a "dictatorship of the worst kind".

In October 2022, following a Pfizer executive's testimony before the EU special committee on the COVID-19 pandemic regarding lack of vaccine testing for preventing disease transmission, Kolakušić made several strong statements to Euro Weekly News, speaking out against the EU's purchase of enough vials of the Pfizer vaccine to inoculate every member of the EU 10 times over (4.5 billion vials / 450 million citizens). He further criticized the lack of disclosure of vaccine ingredients, saying..."no one in the world, except maybe 2 or 3 people, knows what it contains," calling it "the biggest corruption scandal in the history of mankind."

In the same month during a session of the European Parliament, Kolakušić remarked that criminal proceedings should be initiated by the EU against Pfizer for the promotion of billions of dollars of fraudulent medicine.

=== Presidential candidacy ===
A day after the 2019 European Parliament election, on 29 May, Kolakušić announced that he will run at the 2019 Croatian presidential election. On 29 November, he submitted some 15,000 signatures to the State Electoral Commission.

== See also ==
- List of members of the European Parliament, 2019–2024
