= Peter van Dalen =

Dutch politician

Peter van Dalen MEP
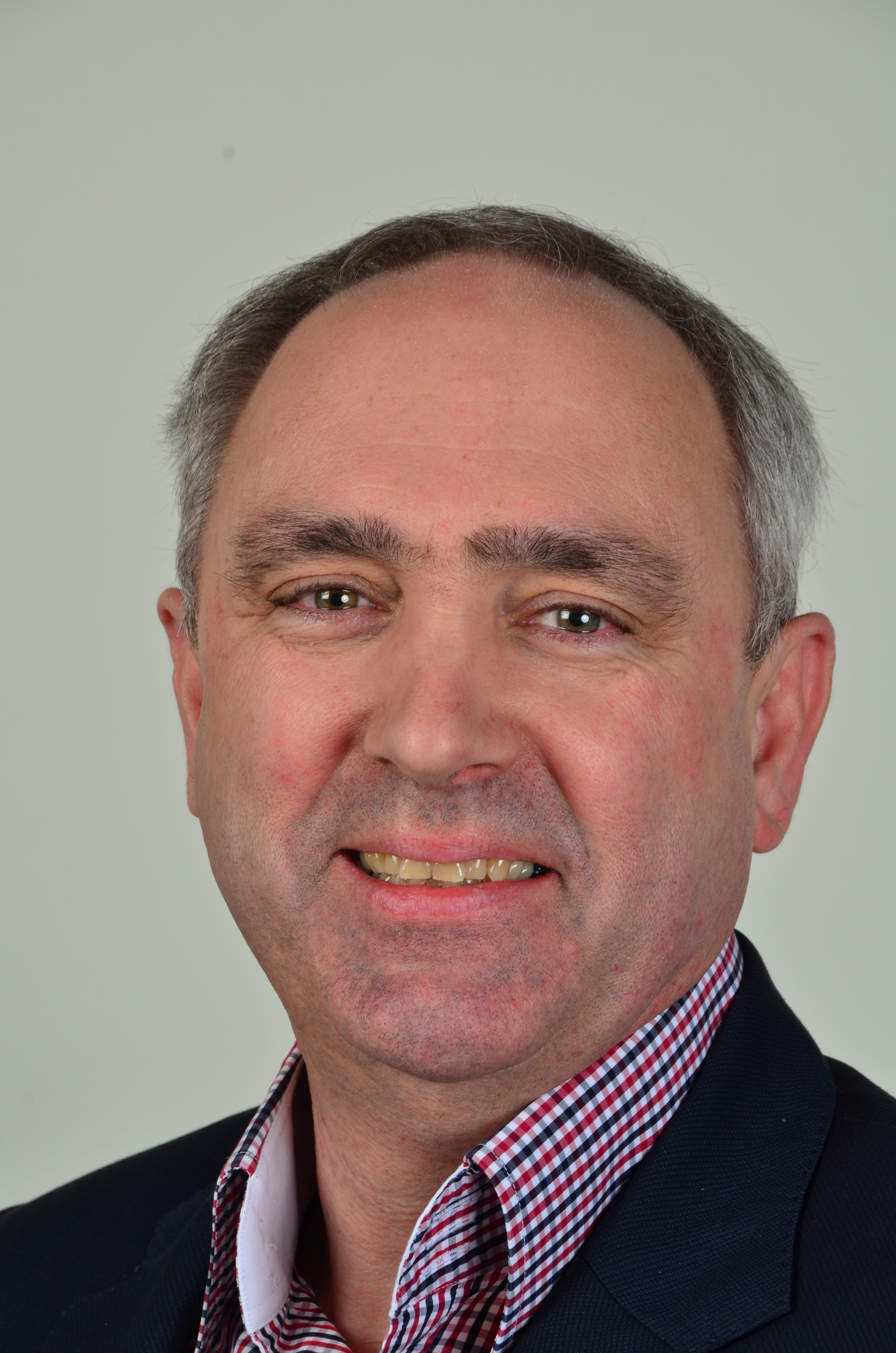

Member of the European Parliament
- In office 14 July 2009 – 3 September 2023
- Succeeded by: Anja Haga
- Constituency: Netherlands

Personal details
- Born: 3 September 1958 (age 68) Zwijndrecht, Netherlands
- Party: Dutch: Christian Union; EU: European People's Party
- Spouse: Corry van Dalen
- Children: 3
- Education: Utrecht University
- Website: www.petervandalen.eu

Peter van Dalen MEP (born 3 September 1958) is a Dutch politician who served as a Member of the European Parliament (MEP) between 2009 and 2023. He is a member of the Christian Union, which used to be part of the European Conservatives and Reformists (ECR), but switched to the European People's Party (EPP) in 2019 following the accession of the far-right Forum for Democracy.

== Pre-political career ==
Van Dalen was educated at the Develstein College, in Zwijndrecht, and studied History and International Relations at Utrecht University. At university, van Dalen was a member of the SSR-NU, a Christian social club for students, and worked in the House of Representatives of the Netherlands as a member of staff for Meindert Leerling, with responsibility for health policy. After graduating in 1983, van Dalen enrolled in Utrecht's law school, but had to drop out in 1985 because he was constantly travelling abroad and was too busy to keep up with his studies. He became a senior policy officer for Leen van der Waal, a Member of the European Parliament for a joint RPF-GPV-SPG (Reformed Political Party) ticket in 1984. In 1989, van Dalen joined the Ministry of Transport, Public Works and Water Management, dealing with the then-European Economic Community (EEC). From 1990 to 2009, van Dalen held increasingly senior positions in the Ministry, reaching the position of Superintendent-Director of the Inspectorate of Transport and Public Works.

== Local government ==
From 1994 to 1998, Van Dalen was a member of the municipal council of Houten for the combined fraction of RPF-GPV and also leader of this fraction.

== European Parliament ==
At the end of February 2009, van Dalen was designated leader for the 2009 European elections of the ChristianUnion – Reformed Political Party. The group won two seats, and sought to join the European Conservatives and Reformists, following the breakup of the Independence/Democracy grouping, but in the European Parliament, the British Conservative Party was critical of the policies of the SGP towards women, and so refused to let the SPG MEP Bas Belder sit in the newly formed European Conservatives and Reformists group. This caused the ChristianUnion – Reformed Political Party to break up, and Bas Belder joined the Europe of Freedom and Democracy grouping. Van Dalen sits on the Committee on Transport and Tourism in the European Parliament.

He resigned in 2023 and was succeeded by Anja Haga.

== Political views ==
Van Dalen is a "Euro-realist" and believes that European cooperation is useful, but that the EU should not lead to a bureaucratic "superstate" involved in anything interfering with domestic social policy. Van Dalen is opposed to Turkish membership of the EU, and believes that the 2008 financial crisis was largely the result of secularisation. Similarly, van Dalen has expressed his belief that secularisation is the biggest threat to Europe.

== Personal life ==
Van Dalen is married and lives in Houten, part of the province of Utrecht. He is a member of the Protestant Church in the Netherlands (PKN).
