= Anja Haga =

Dutch politician (born 1976)

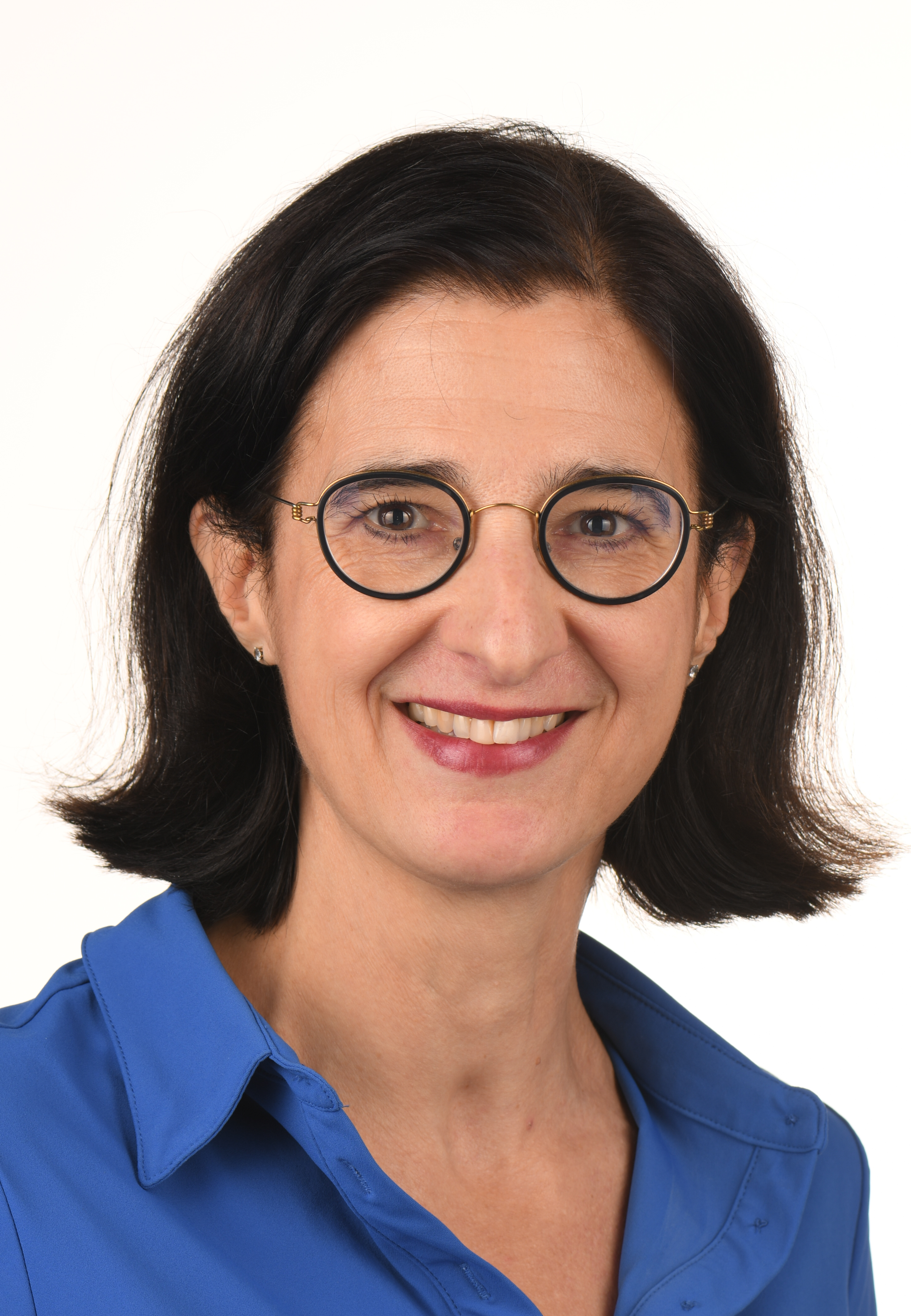
- Anja Haga in 2024

Mayor of Dantumadiel (acting)
- Incumbent
- Assumed office 18 November 2024
- Preceded by: Klaas Agricola

Member of the European Parliament
- In office 5 September 2023 – 15 July 2024
- Preceded by: Peter van Dalen
- Parliamentary group: European People's Party Group
- Constituency: Netherlands

Alderperson of Arnhem
- In office 30 November 2015 – 19 June 2017
- Preceded by: Henk Kok

Member of the Provincial Council of Friesland
- In office 26 May 2010 – 16 December 2015
- Preceded by: Sicco Boorsma
- Succeeded by: Richard Klerks

Personal details
- Born: 25 December 1976 (age 49) Drachten, Netherlands
- Party: Christian Union (European Christian Political Party)
- Education: University of Groningen
- Occupation: Politician; clinical linguist
- Website: anjahaga.eu

Anja Haga (Dutch pronunciation: [ˈɑɲaː ˈɦaːɣaː]; born 25 December 1976) is a Dutch politician of the Christian Union (CU) who served as a Member of the European Parliament (MEP) between September 2023 and July 2024. Born in Drachten, she studied at the University of Groningen and subsequently became a clinical linguist. She switched to the private sector after a number of years, and by then she had become politically active. She lost in 2007 provincial elections in Friesland, but she did receive a seat in its council in 2010 to fill a vacancy. Haga was re-elected the following year and succeeded Piet Adema as parliamentary leader. She often commented on issues of public transport and sustainability, and she secured a third term in the provincial council in 2015 as her party's lead candidate.

Haga joined the municipal executive of Arnhem in November 2015, focusing on sustainability, migration, and healthcare. She received criticism for her handling of complaints by neighbors of an asylum seekers' center. Haga eventually resigned when the Christian Union left the governing coalition over disagreements about a street prostitution zone. After working six years for forestry management organization Staatsbosbeheer, Haga succeeded Peter van Dalen as an MEP in 2023. She had been the third candidate on the joint Christian Union – Reformed Political Party list in the 2019 European Parliament election. Haga lost her bid for re-election, and her term ended in July 2024.

In November 2024, Haga became acting mayor of Dantumadeel.

== Early life and career ==
Anja Haga was born on 25 December 1976 in Drachten, Friesland, where she was raised in the West Frisian language. Her father ran a farm in Blije, but he decided to close down the family business rather than to invest in a required modernization when Haga was young. She attended the Gomarus College high school in Groningen, graduating in 1995 with a VWO diploma. She subsequently went to a conservatory, playing the Western concert flute, and she started studying the Spanish language at the University of Groningen. Haga left the conservatory after a year to study linguistics at the latter university, and she would later in her career also obtain a postgraduate degree in European policy making from the Vrije Universiteit Brussel. Haga got married in 1999 or 2000. After she completed her studies in Groningen around that time, the couple moved to Leeuwarden, where they lived in its Camminghaburen district. She is a member of the Protestant Church in the Netherlands but told in 2015 that she also often visits Catholic churches.

Haga started her career in 2001 as a clinical linguist at hospitals in Haren and Leeuwarden, and she served on the provincial board of the Dutch Association for Speech Therapy and Phoniatrics (NVLF). She did some trainings in business administration to switch to a corporate career in 2006, working consecutively for pharmaceutical company Wyeth and as procurement manager for medical devices producer Covidien. She left her job in 2010, when she became a member of the Provincial Council of Friesland.

== Provincial Council of Friesland ==
Haga joined the Christian Union (CU) in the early 2000s – shortly after that party had been formed through a merger of the Reformed Political League (GPV) and the Reformatory Political Federation (RPF). She has told that a united Christian party appealed to her, and she sees politics as the arena where she can put her faith into practice. She was a board member of the Christian Union's Leeuwarden chapter in the period 2003–06 and started serving on the national campaign team. She first ran for office in March 2007 provincial elections in Friesland. The Christian Union won three seats, while Haga was their sixth candidate. She did become a member of the citizens and community committee of the Provincial Council of Friesland, an unelected position, in January 2009. She again appeared on the party list in 2010 municipal elections in Leeuwarden, but she was not elected. When councilor Sicco Boorsma stepped down in May 2010 to become an alderperson, Haga was appointed to succeed him. She became her party's spokesperson for finances, economy, recreation, education, culture, language, and spatial planning.

She was re-elected in March 2011 as the Christian Union's second candidate – behind Piet Adema – and her specialties switched to transportation, environment, and countryside. The party itself retained its three council seats, and it moved from the governing coalition to the opposition. Haga succeeded Piet Adema as parliamentary leader in May 2011, when Adema left the council to become acting mayor. A few months later, Haga announced she would no longer make debate contributions in the West Frisian language, opting for Dutch instead. A grammatical mistake of hers had been pointed out by a colleague, and she described her language skills as "good enough but not for the provincial council". Due to her decision, the share of councilors debating in West Frisian dropped to 52%.

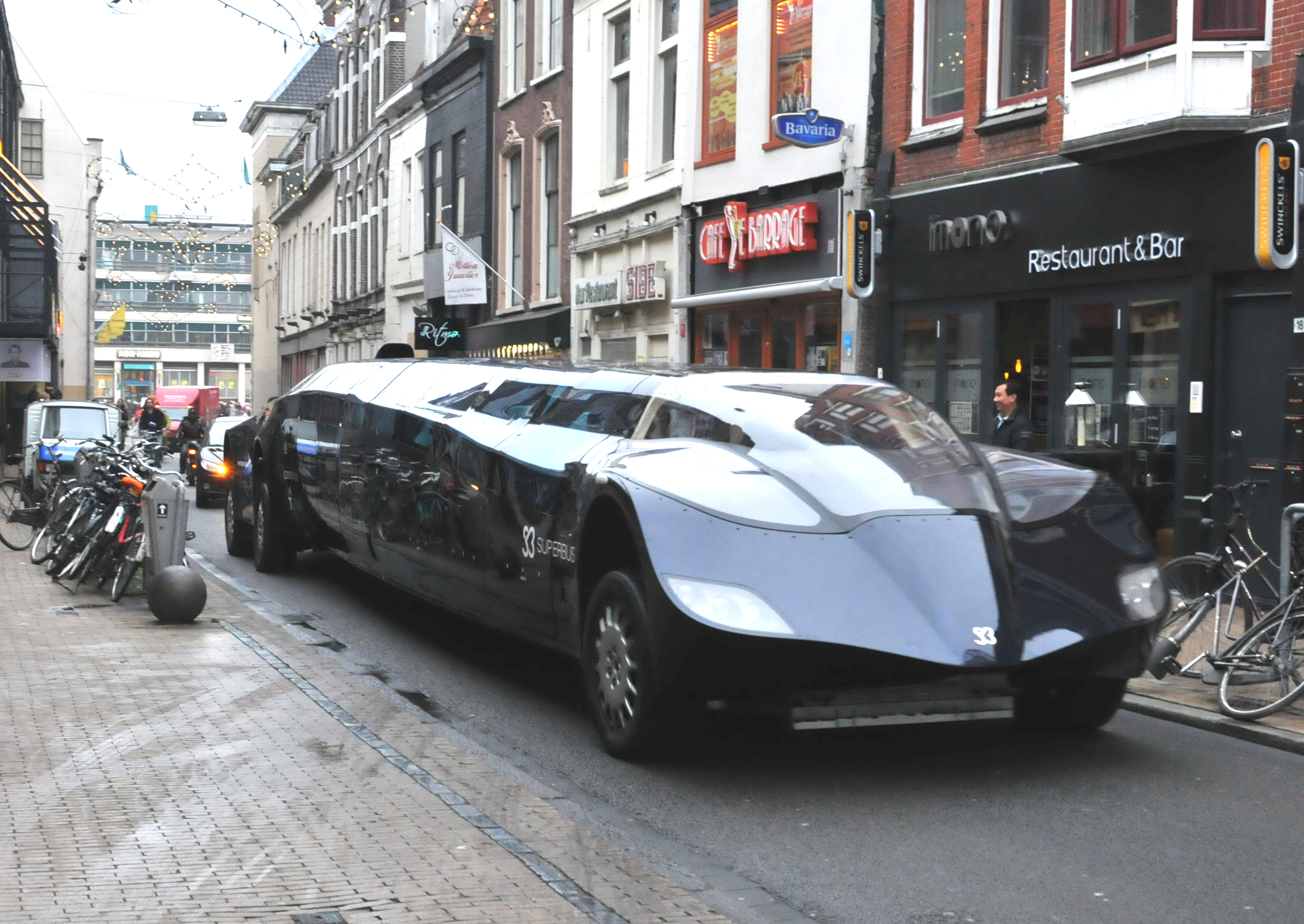
A prototype of the proposed Superbus, which would transport passengers with high speeds

Haga argued in an opinion piece that cooperation between the provinces of Friesland, Groningen, and Drenthe was important to effectively lobby for the region's interests, but she opposed a merger of the provinces. In the council, she often commented on the accessibility of Friesland by public transport. Haga criticized the province's lobby when Friesland was not included in a night-time train service to the Randstad region and when it did not receive funding for the implementation of the European Rail Traffic Management System (ERTMS), which would allow for higher speeds. In response to abandoned plans of a railway between Heerenveen and Groningen, Haga supported an investigation into the Superbus project, a proposed high-speed vehicle that would receive a dedicated lane on the A7 motorway. In talks over the placement of wind turbines, she decried the province's slow decision making and warned that control over site selection could be taken over by the national government in the absence of a determination. She also called for more wind turbines by local initiatives rather than placing the majority in the IJsselmeer, and she proposed the introduction of temporary instead of permanent permits for the turbines. Haga's proposal for all energy generation in Friesland to be free of fossil fuels by 2050 was unanimously adopted by the council. Fellow councilors named Haga the best provincial politician in 2015 in a poll organized by the Friesch Dagblad.

Haga ran for the House of Representatives in 2012 elections. She occupied the eighth spot on the party list, while the Christian Union did not manage to expand its seat count of five. Haga received another term as provincial councilor in March 2015 elections, when she served as the Christian Union's lead candidate. The party did not secure an additional seat despite its slightly increased vote share. Haga filled several positions next to her seat on the council: she joined the board of the Christian Union's directors association in 2010, and she counseled it from 2013 until 2015. Additionally, she advised the party's parliamentary group in the House of Representatives on healthcare. She supported the Leeuwarden food bank as vice chair and Zorgbelang Fryslân (patient interests) and World Servants Netherlands (volunteering) as supervisory board member.

== Arnhem alderwoman ==
When GroenLinks broke with the governing coalition in Arnhem in October 2015, the Christian Union joined the remaining parties – D66, SP, and the CDA. Haga was announced as the successor of Henk Kok, GroenLinks's alderperson in the municipal executive. She was sworn in on 30 November, and she stepped down from the provincial council. She took over Kok's portfolio containing healthcare, welfare, neighborhoods, refugees, and sustainability. Haga was granted an exception to the residency requirement for alderpersons by the municipal council such that she could remain in Dokkum, to where she had moved from Leeuwarden the year before. She did rent an apartment in the area for weekdays. Haga worked to make it easier to apply for subsidies for citizen initiatives after appropriated funds were left unused, and she selected six sites for solar farms, which would fit between 25,000 and 48,000 panels. The latter was in order for Arnhem to achieve its goal to generate 14% of its energy renewably by 2020.

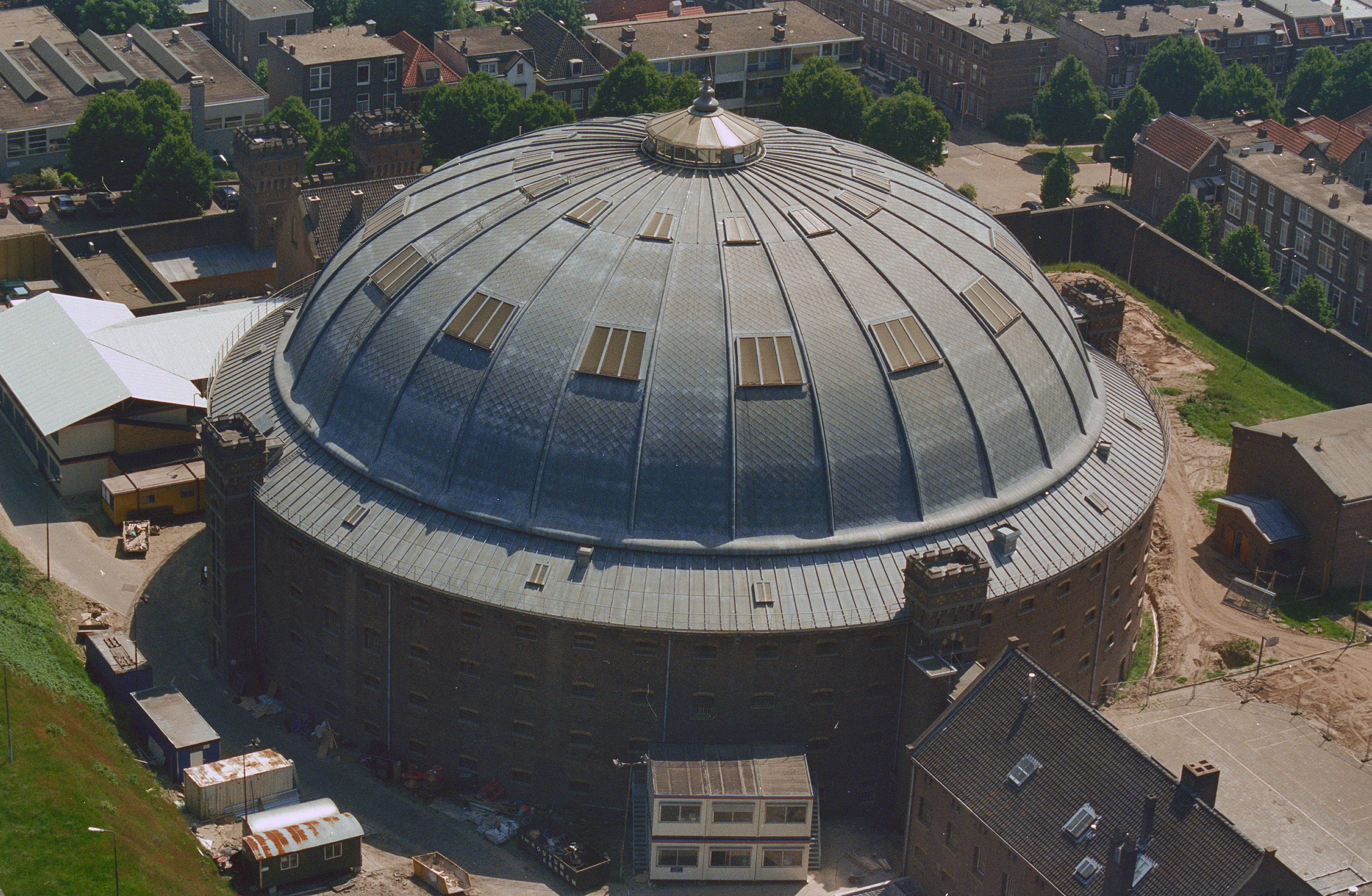
The Arnhem Koepelgevangenis, which was used as an emergency shelter for refugees, as seen from above

Amongst an increased influx of migrants, partly as a result of the Syrian Civil War, the executive decided to postpone the closure of an emergency shelter for refugees in the Koepelgevangenis. Haga also worked with the COA to allow refugees to stay in Arnhem after receiving a residence permit, believing this would aid their integration into society. In April 2016, asylum seekers' center Elderhoeve was opened in Arnhem's southern district. In the municipal council, some political parties repeated complaints from neighbors of the center that no new access road was constructed, to which Haga responded that it was unnecessary from a traffic-engineering point of view. Five months after Elderhoeve's opening – when neighbors complained about nuisances and a lack of promised measures to mitigate them – Haga responded that only four reports had been filed. After a councilor had pointed out that her statement had been false, she revised the number to 112 a few weeks later. 63 reports originated from a single household. By then, Arnhem Centraal, a local party, had declared that it no longer trusted Haga. The executive demanded the party to either press a motion of no confidence or to withdraw its statements, but Arnhem Centraal opted for neither action. Opposition parties scolded Haga once more in December 2016, when she could not clearly answer whether neighbors had helped draw up evaluation criteria for the asylum seekers' center as had been promised. They said concerns of neighbors were repeatedly disregarded.

In March 2017, Haga said the municipality should consider closing its street prostitution zone, as the number of permits had sunk below ten. Arnhem had been phasing out the practice since 2011 by not granting new permits. Following Haga's proposal, however, a large council majority expressed its desire to keep open the zone out of fear prostitutes would continue illegally. In June, the executive announced it would close the zone effective the following year with Haga calling the work degrading. Coalition parties D66 and SP responded furiously to Haga's decision, and the Christian Union subsequently chose to leave the governing coalition, triggering Haga's resignation as alderperson on 19 June. She became the fourth alderperson to leave the municipal executive during the term. The council undid the decision to close the prostitution zone and would await an investigation to make further determinations on the zone's future.

Following her resignation, Haga filled positions as account manager and adviser at forestry management organization Staatsbosbeheer for six years. When MSC Zoe – a container ship – lost a number of her containers in the North Sea in January 2019, Haga joined colleagues from Staatsbosbheer in cleaning up the beaches of Terschelling. She and her husband have subsequently aimed to live without using disposable plastic. She joined the board of A Rocha Netherlands, a Christian nature conservation organization in 2020. In politics, Haga was one of her party's lijstduwers in the 2017 general election but said she did not aspire to enter the House of Representatives. She also served as chair of a committee to select the Christian Union's candidates for the 2019 Senate election.

== European Parliament ==
Haga first ran for the European Parliament in a 2019 election on the joint Christian Union – Reformed Political Party list, occupying its third spot. She presented a four-point plan for the Northern Netherlands that included protection of the Wadden Sea, better train connections to the region, stimulating circular agriculture, and advocating for preservation of Dutch Low Saxon and the West Frisian language. The Christian Union won two seats in the election. Haga's nearly 38,000 votes were enough to meet the preference vote threshold, but the first two candidates had garnered more. She did become an adviser of MEP Peter van Dalen, who had been the lead candidate, focusing on the European Green Deal. In a joint opinion piece, they argued the deal was just the start of necessary measures to mitigate climate change, and they said more investments and incentives would be required for the transport and agriculture sectors.

In June 2023, Van Dalen announced he would step down as of September. He had been asked by the Christian Union's board to make room for Haga to gain experience ahead of the 2024 European Parliament election, as Van Dalen was nearing a party-imposed term limit. Haga was sworn into the European Parliament on 5 September, being part of the European People's Party Group. The Christian Union and the Reformed Political Party had by then ended their cooperation. Haga told that she wanted to take care of God's creation, describing herself as a "Christian with a green heart", and she said she would focus on freedom of religion, reducing plastic usage, and a humane migration policy. She took over the committee assignments of her predecessor, and she remained a resident of Dokkum.

The Christian Union's board officially announced on 12 January 2024 its nomination of Haga as lead candidate in the June 2024 European Parliament election. Her party's vote share of 2.9% was insufficient for a seat, and Haga's term as MEP ended on 15 July 2024.

=== Committee memberships ===
- Committee on Fisheries
- Subcommittee on Human Rights
- Delegation for relations with the countries of South Asia
- Committee on Foreign Affairs (substitute)
- Delegation for relations with the Mashreq countries (substitute)

== Electoral history ==
Electoral history of Anja Haga
Year	Body	Party	Pos.	Votes	Result		Ref.
Year	Body	Party	Pos.	Votes	Party seats	Individual	Ref.
2007	Provincial Council of Friesland	Christian Union	6		3	Lost (Note: Haga was appointed to the body later during the term due to a vacancy.)	
2010	Leeuwarden Municipal Council	Christian Union	5	56	2	Lost	
2011	Provincial Council of Friesland	Christian Union	2		3	Won	
2012	House of Representatives	Christian Union	8	2,262	5	Lost	
2015	Provincial Council of Friesland	Christian Union	1	13,976	3	Won	
2017	House of Representatives	Christian Union	46 (Note: Haga participated as a lijstduwer.)	568	5	Lost	
2019	European Parliament	CU-SGP	3	37,813	2	Lost	
2023	Provincial Council of Friesland	Christian Union	44	75	2	Lost	
2024	European Parliament	Christian Union	1	139,520	0	Lost	
