= List of members of the European Parliament for Malta, 2019–2024 =

This is a list of the six members of the European Parliament for Malta in the 2019 to 2024 session.

== List ==
Name	National party	EP Group
David Casa	Nationalist Party	EPP
Josianne Cutajar	Labour Party	S&D
Cyrus Engerer	Labour Party	S&D
Miriam Dalli (2019-2020)	Labour Party	S&D
Roberta Metsola	Nationalist Party	EPP
Alex Agius Saliba	Labour Party	S&D
Alfred Sant	Labour Party	S&D

=== Party representation ===
National party	EP Group	Seats	±
Labour Party	S&D	4 / 6	+1
Nationalist Party	EPP	2 / 6	−1
