= Rob Roos =

Dutch politician

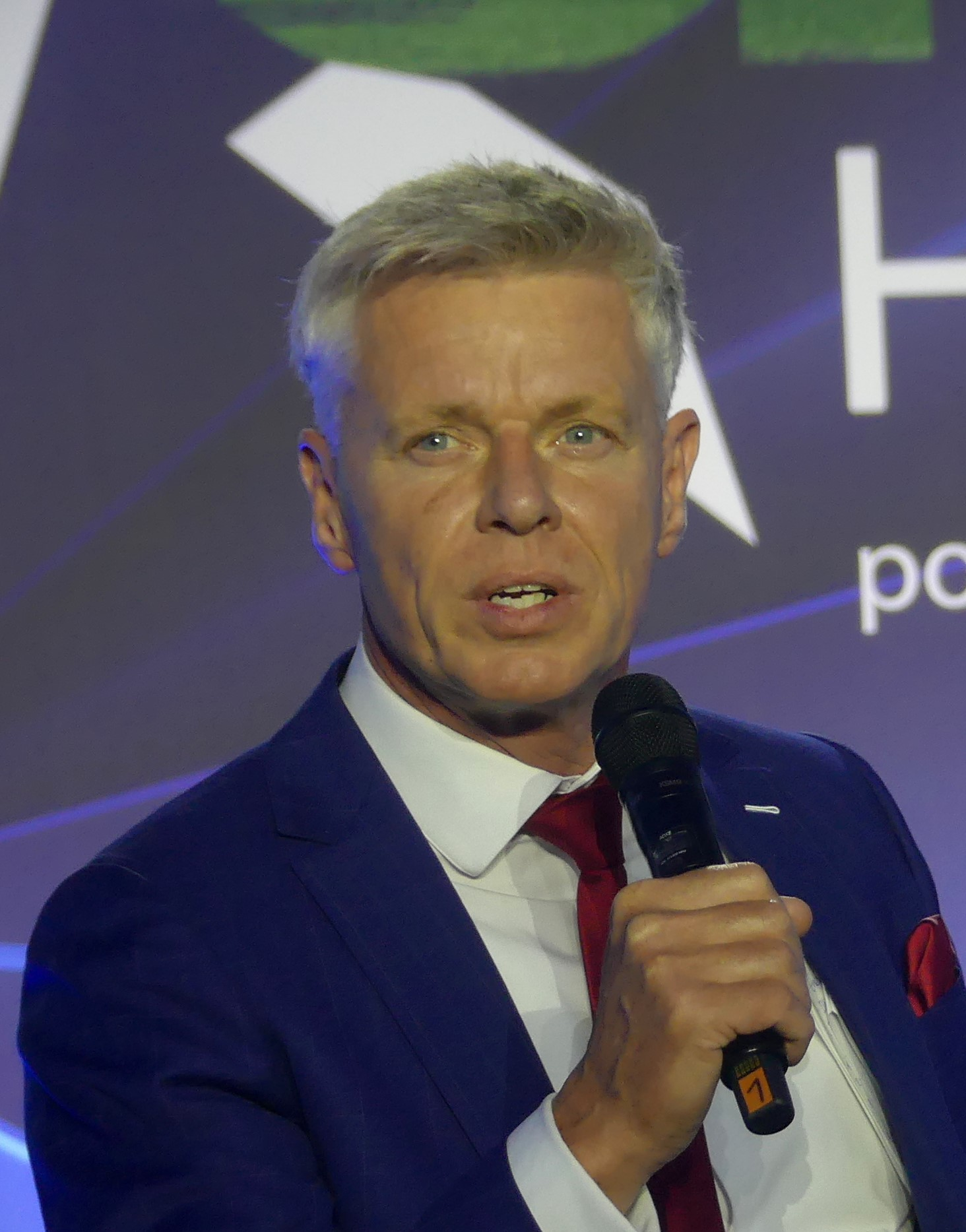
At CPAC Hungary 2023

Robert "Rob" Roos (born 2 August 1966) is a Dutch politician who served as a Member of the European Parliament (MEP) between 2019 and 2024. He was a member of the JA21 political party from 2020-2023, after leaving Forum for Democracy (FvD) in 2020.

== Career ==
Roos was born in Rotterdam.

He pursued a degree in Electrical Energy Technology at the Erasmus University Rotterdam (1989-1992) and then a post-graduate degree in Business Administration at Utrecht University.

He began his professional career as a mid-level manager in engineering and construction companies, working on large projects in the construction and energy sectors.

Having accumulated some capital, he decided to start his own business in 2000, with clients in the railway, energy, transport, utilities, and telecommunications sector. In 2011, Roos launched his own telecom company, investing in and building fibre optic networks for other companies across the Netherlands. In 2013, he created his own Internet Service Provider company running on his own networks. In total, Roos has founded eight companies, bought several other companies, and merged them into two clusters which he sold in 2016 and 2018.

He briefly served in the States of South Holland from 28 March 2019 to 4 September 2019, in which he chaired the FvD group. He had been lijsttrekker in the 2019 provincial election. In the 2019 European Parliament election, he was placed second on the list led by Derk Jan Eppink. In the 2019 Senate election, he was placed thirteenth on the list led by Henk Otten.

Roos later represented JA21 in a Netherlands seat in the EU Parliament. He was vice-chair of the European Conservatives and Reformists Group. In 2023, he participated in the second meeting of the Madrid Forum of the national conservative Spanish political party Vox in Lima, Peru. He did not run for re-election in June 2024, and his term as MEP ended on 15 July 2024.
