= Rob Rooken =

Dutch politician

Rob Rooken MEP

Member of the European Parliament
- In office 2 July 2019 – 15 July 2024
- Constituency: Netherlands

Personal details
- Born: Rob Jan Rooken; 5 October 1969 (age 56) Groningen, Netherlands
- Party: Forum for Democracy (until 2020); Independent (2020); JA21 (2020–2023)

Rob Jan Rooken (born 5 October 1969) is a Dutch politician who served as a Member of the European Parliament (MEP) between July 2019 and July 2024.

Rooken worked as a web designer before entering politics. He was also the founder of the IT company XOIP which was sold to Tiscali in 2001 before Rooken bought it back. He was elected to the European Parliament in May 2019 as the third candidate of Forum for Democracy (FVD), taking office on 2 July. He unsuccessfully ran for the Senate days after his election as MEP, being placed seventh on the party list. Rooken switched parties to JA21 in 2020. He did not run for re-election to the European Parliament in June 2024, and his term ended on 15 July 2024.
