= 2024 European Parliament election in the Netherlands =

- 6 June 2024
- 31 Netherlands seats in the European Parliament
- Turnout: 46.2%
| Party | Leader | Vote % | Seats | +/– |
|---|---|---|---|---|
| GL/PvdA | Bas Eickhout (Note: Ran separately in 2019. 6 seats for PvdA and 3 seats for GL.) | 21.1 | 8 | −1 |
| PVV | Sebastiaan Stöteler | 17.0 | 6 | +6 |
| VVD | Malik Azmani | 11.3 | 4 | 0 |
| CDA | Tom Berendsen | 9.5 | 3 | −1 |
| D66 | Gerben-Jan Gerbrandy | 8.4 | 3 | +1 |
| BBB | Sander Smit | 5.4 | 2 | New |
| Volt | Reinier van Lanschot | 5.1 | 2 | +2 |
| PvdD | Anja Hazekamp | 4.5 | 1 | 0 |
| NSC | Dirk Gotink | 3.7 | 1 | New |
| SGP | Bert-Jan Ruissen (Note: Ran with CU–SGP in 2019. Won 1 seat for SGP.) | 3.7 | 1 | 0 |
This lists parties that won seats. See the complete results below.

The 2024 European Parliament election in the Netherlands was held on 6 June 2024 as part of the 2024 European Parliament election. It was the tenth time the elections have been held for the European elections in the Netherlands, and the first to take place after Brexit.

Left-wing GroenLinks–PvdA retained its plurality, winning eight seats. The right-wing populist Party for Freedom saw the largest increase in seats, going from zero to six compared to the previous election.

== Electoral system ==
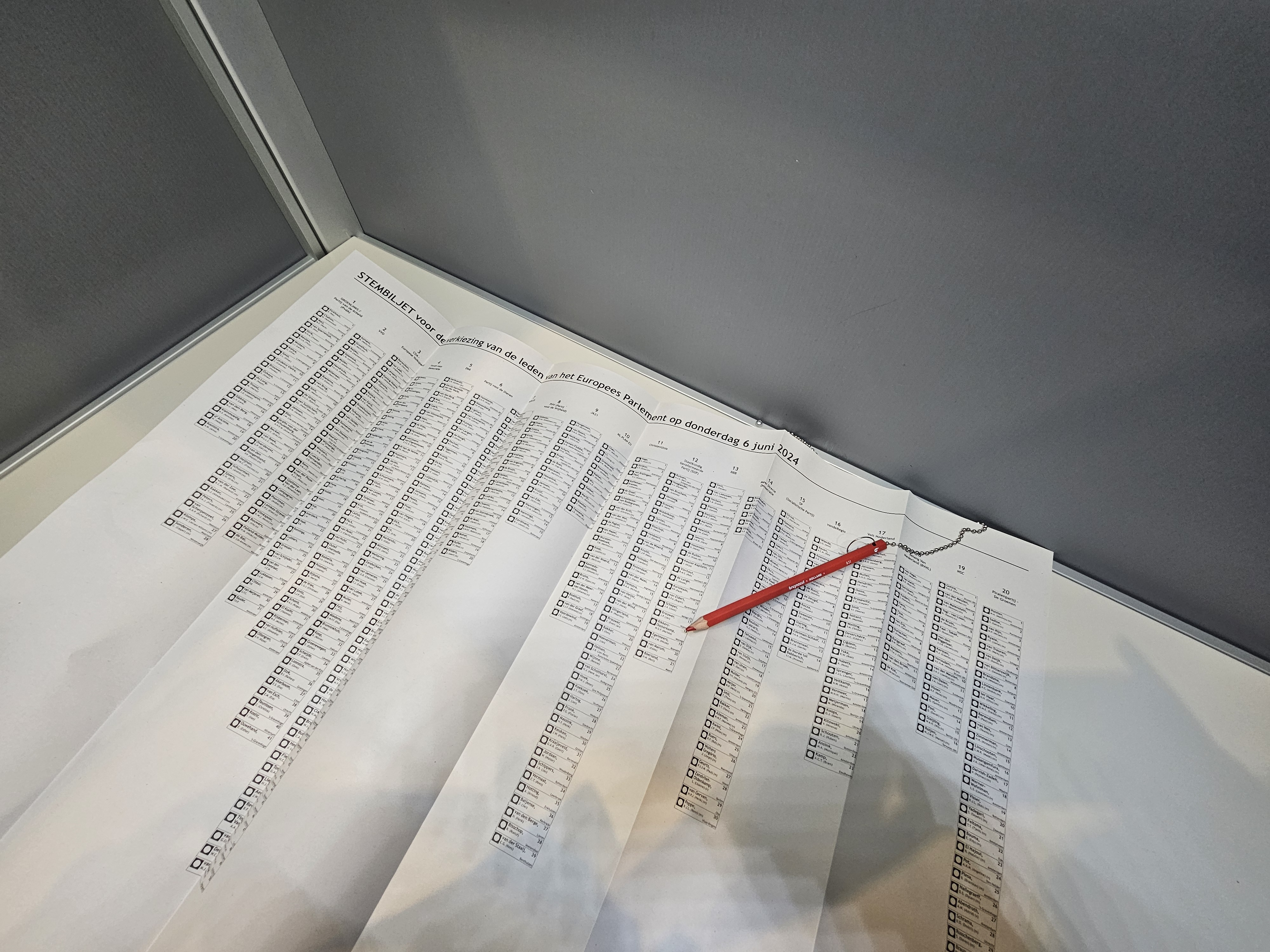
Ballot paper for the European Parliament election in the Netherlands, 2024

=== Apportionment ===
Compared to last election, Netherlands is entitled to five more MEPs: three already assigned in 2020 in the occasion of the redistribution post Brexit, and two assigned in 2023 after a pre-election assessment of the Parliament composition based on the most recent population figures. The 31 members are elected through semi-open list proportional representation in a single nationwide constituency with seats allocated through D'Hondt method. Parties that do not reach a full Hare quota are ineligible to receive remainder seats, meaning there is an effective electoral threshold of around 3.23%.

=== Electoral law ===
Both Dutch nationals and EU citizens residing in the Netherlands are entitled to vote in the European elections in the Netherlands. No voter registration is needed for EU nationals (including Dutch citizens) residing within the country, but they do need to be registered as a resident in their municipality on 23 April 2024. Dutch citizen residing abroad are required to register as "Dutch voter abroad" in the municipality of The Hague. In addition, those eligible to vote must turn 18 years old by election day at the latest.

The seats won by a list are first allocated to the candidates who, in preferential votes, have received at least 10% of the Hare quota (effectively a tenth of a seat or 0.32% of the total votes), regardless of their placement on the electoral list. If multiple candidates from a list pass this threshold, their ordering is determined based on the number of votes received. Any remaining seats are allocated to candidates according to their position on the electoral list.

Five municipalities – Alphen aan den Rijn, Midden-Delfland, Boekel, Borne, and Tynaarlo – will have a pilot to test an A3-size ballot, smaller than ones used in prior elections. The revised ballot would not list all candidate names and would instead ask voters to select the candidate number regardless of party. If successful, it is planned to be used nationwide starting with the 2026 municipal elections.

== Contesting parties ==
| Party | | European Party | Group | 2019 result | Top candidate |
|---|---|---|---|---|---|
| GL/PvdA | GroenLinks–PvdA: GreenLeft; Labour Party | EGP / PES | Greens-EFA / S&D | 29.9 (Note: ran separately in 2019.) | Bas Eickhout |
| VVD | People's Party for Freedom and Democracy | ALDE | RE | 14.6 | Malik Azmani |
| CDA | Christian Democratic Appeal | EPP | EPP | 12.2 | Tom Berendsen |
| FvD | Forum for Democracy | − | NI | 11.0 | Ralf Dekker |
| D66 | Democrats 66 | ALDE | RE | 7.1 | Gerben-Jan Gerbrandy |
| CU | Christian Union | ECPM | EPP | 6.8 | Anja Haga |
| SGP | Reformed Political Party | ECPM | ECR | 6.8 | Bert-Jan Ruissen |
| PvdD | Party for the Animals | APEU | GUE/NGL | 4.0 | Anja Hazekamp |
| 50+ | 50PLUS | EDP | RE | 3.9 | Adriana Hernández |
| PVV | Party for Freedom | ID | ID | 3.5 | Sebastiaan Stöteler |
| SP | Socialist Party | − | GUE/NGL | 3.4 | Gerrie Elfrink |
| Volt | Volt Netherlands | Volt | Greens-EFA | 1.9 | Reinier van Lanschot |
| PP–DG | Pirate Party–The Greens: Pirate Party; The Greens | PPEU | − | 0.4 (Note: ran separately in 2019, with PPNL running together with vandeRegio) | Matthijs Pontier |
| VDR | vandeRegio | EFA | − | 0.2 (Note: ran together with Pirate Party in 2019) | Sent Wierda |
| BBB | Farmer–Citizen Movement | − | − | − | Sander Smit |
| BVNL | Interest of the Netherlands | − | − | − | Wybren van Haga |
| JA21 | JA21 | − | ECR | − | Michiel Hoogeveen |
| MDD | More Direct Democracy | − | ECR | − | Dorien Rookmaker |
| NLPLAN | Nederland met een Plan | − | − | − | Kok Chan |
| NSC | New Social Contract | − | − | − | Dirk Gotink |

== Campaign ==
Newspaper NRC wrote that the election campaign was overshadowed by the conclusion of the 2023–2024 cabinet formation and that it only gained momentum in the week prior. Polling by Ipsos I&O showed that name recognition of the lead candidates barely increased during the campaign.

On election day, CDA, PVV, and FVD reported that their websites had been hit by denial-of-service attacks, and pro-Russian hacker group HackNeT claimed responsibility.

=== Debates ===
The NOS organized a television debate the day before the election. The lead candidates of the nine biggest parties in the November 2023 general election and in the polls – PVV, GroenLinks–PvdA, VVD, CDA, SP, D66, NSC, Volt, and BBB – participated. Anja Haga (Christian Union) and Anja Hazekamp (PvdD), who did not qualify, debated each other the same day in De Balie.

== Opinion polling ==
=== Seats ===
Exit poll

| Polling firm | Fieldwork date | Sample size | Total | GL–PvdA | | VVD Renew | CDA EPP | FvD NI | D66 Renew | SGP ECR | CU EPP | PvdD Left | 50PLUS Renew | PVV ID | SP Left | Volt G/EFA | BBB EPP | NSC EPP | Lead | Ref |
| Polling firm | Fieldwork date | Sample size | Total | PvdA S&D | GL G/EFA | VVD Renew | CDA EPP | FvD NI | D66 Renew | SGP ECR | CU EPP | PvdD Left | 50PLUS Renew | PVV ID | SP Left | Volt G/EFA | BBB EPP | NSC EPP | Lead | Ref |
|---|---|---|---|---|---|---|---|---|---|---|---|---|---|---|---|---|---|---|---|---|
| Ipsos | 6 Jun 2024 | – | 31 | 8 | | 4 | 3 | 0 | 3 | 1 | 0 | 1 | 0 | 7 | 0 | 1 | 2 | 1 | 1 | |
| Peil.nl | 5 Jun 2024 | – | 31 | 8 | | 4 | 2 | 1 | 2 | 1 | 0 | 1 | 0 | 8 | 0 | 2 | 1 | 1 | Tie | |
| Ipsos | 3–5 Jun 2024 | 2,030 | 31 | 8 | | 5 | 2 | 0 | 2 | 0 | 0 | 1 | 0 | 8 | 1 | 1 | 1 | 2 | Tie | |
| Ipsos | 24–27 May 2024 | 2,048 | 31 | 8 | | 5 | 2 | 0 | 2 | 0 | 0 | 0 | 0 | 9 | 1 | 2 | 1 | 1 | 1 | |
| I&O Research | 17–21 May 2024 | 2,141 | 31 | 7 | | 4 | 2 | 0 | 2 | 1 | 0 | 1 | 0 | 9 | 1 | 2 | 1 | 1 | 2 | |
| Peil.nl | 17–18 May 2024 | – | 31 | 8 | | 5 | 2 | 1 | 2 | 0 | 0 | 1 | 0 | 8 | 1 | 1 | 1 | 1 | Tie | |
| I&O Research | 10–14 May 2024 | 2,102 | 31 | 8 | | 4 | 2 | 1 | 2 | 1 | 1 | 0 | 0 | 8 | 1 | 2 | 0 | 1 | Tie | |
| Peil.nl | 3–4 May 2024 | – | 31 | 8 | | 5 | 2 | 1 | 2 | 0 | 0 | 1 | 0 | 8 | 1 | 1 | 1 | 1 | Tie | |
| I&O Research | 12–15 Apr 2024 | 2,182 | 31 | 7 | | 5 | 2 | 0 | 3 | 1 | 0 | 1 | 0 | 8 | 1 | 1 | 1 | 1 | 1 | |
| I&O Research | 22–25 Mar 2024 | 1,586 | 31 | 7 | | 5 | 2 | 0 | 2 | 1 | 0 | 1 | 0 | 10 | 0 | 2 | 1 | 0 | 3 | |
| Ipsos | 23 Feb – 5 Mar 2024 | 1,890 | 31 | 6 | | 5 | 2 | 0 | 2 | 0 | 0 | 1 | 0 | 9 | 1 | 2 | 1 | 2 | 3 | |
| 2019 election | 23 May 2019 | – | 29 | 6 | 3 | 5 | 4 | 4 | 2 | 2 | | 1 | 1 | 1 | 0 | 0 | – | – | 1 | |

=== Vote share ===
Exit poll

| Polling firm | Fieldwork date | Sample size | GL–PvdA | | VVD Renew | CDA EPP | FvD NI | D66 Renew | SGP ECR | CU EPP | PvdD Left | 50PLUS Renew | PVV ID | SP Left | Volt G/EFA | JA21 ECR | BBB EPP | NSC EPP | Others | Lead | Ref |
| Polling firm | Fieldwork date | Sample size | PvdA S&D | GL G/EFA | VVD Renew | CDA EPP | FvD NI | D66 Renew | SGP ECR | CU EPP | PvdD Left | 50PLUS Renew | PVV ID | SP Left | Volt G/EFA | JA21 ECR | BBB EPP | NSC EPP | Others | Lead | Ref |
|---|---|---|---|---|---|---|---|---|---|---|---|---|---|---|---|---|---|---|---|---|---|
| Ipsos | 6 Jun 2024 | – | 21.6% | | 11.6% | 9.7% | 2.5% | 8.1% | 3.4% | 2.7% | 4.4% | 0.8% | 17.7% | 2.0% | 4.9% | – | 5.3% | 3.8% | 1.7% | 3.9% | |
| Ipsos | 3–5 Jun 2024 | 2,030 | 19.5% | | 13.8% | 6.1% | 2.7% | 7.1% | 2.4% | 2.7% | 3.6% | 0.6% | 21.3% | 3.6% | 4.4% | – | 4.0% | 5.0% | 3.3% | 1.8% | |
| Ipsos | 24–27 May 2024 | 2,048 | 20.3% | | 12.5% | 5.3% | 3.2% | 6.4% | 2.3% | 3.0% | 3.1% | 0.6% | 22.7% | 3.2% | 6.3% | – | 3.9% | 4.7% | 2.5% | 2.4% | |
| I&O Research | 17–21 May 2024 | 2,141 | 19.3% | | 10.9% | 5.7% | 2.9% | 7.1% | 3.8% | 3.0% | 4.5% | – | 23.0% | 3.3% | 5.9% | 1.4% | 4.4% | 3.5% | 1.4% | 3.7% | |
| I&O Research | 10–14 May 2024 | 2,102 | 21.3% | | 11.8% | 5.8% | 3.6% | 6.8% | 3.8% | 3.3% | 3.2% | – | 22.5% | 3.4% | 5.4% | 0.8% | 3.2% | 3.5% | 1.8% | 1.2% | |
| I&O Research | 12–15 Apr 2024 | 2,182 | 18.7% | | 12.6% | 5.4% | 3.1% | 7.8% | 3.3% | 3.0% | 4.6% | – | 22.0% | 3.6% | 4.7% | 1.1% | 4.3% | 4.2% | 1.6% | 3.3% | |
| I&O Research | 22–25 Mar 2024 | 1,586 | 18.6% | | 14.1% | 5.5% | 3.0% | 7.0% | 3.8% | 3.1% | 4.0% | – | 25.1% | 2.9% | 5.2% | 1.0% | 3.9% | 3.1% | – | 6.5% | |
| Ipsos | 23 Feb – 5 Mar 2024 | 1,890 | 16.0% | | 12.7% | 5.6% | 2.3% | 6.0% | 2.6% | 2.4% | 3.7% | – | 22.4% | 3.2% | 4.9% | – | 4.5% | 4.7% | 8.8% | 6.4% | |
| Portland | 24–31 Jan 2024 | 535 | 17% | | 12% | 5% | 2% | 5% | 3% | 1% | 3% | 1% | 25% | 3% | 3% | 2% | 4% | 12% | 2% | 8% | |
| 2019 election | 23 May 2019 | – | 19.0% | 10.9% | 14.6% | 12.2% | 11.0% | 7.1% | 6.8% | | 4.0% | 3.9% | 3.5% | 3.4% | 1.9% | – | – | – | 1.6% | 4.4% | |

== Results ==
With most votes counted, GroenLinks–PvdA managed to retain its plurality despite losing one of its nine seats compared to the 2019 election, when GroenLinks and PvdA participated separately. The Party for Freedom, which had won the November 2023 general election, was the biggest winner, going from zero to six seats. The People's Party for Freedom and Democracy (VVD) came in third with four seats. Forum for Democracy, 50PLUS, and the Christian Union, which no longer participated on a shared list with the Reformed Political Party, lost their seats, while the Farmer–Citizen Movement (2), Volt Netherlands (2), and New Social Contract (1) won representation for the first time. Other parties that secured seats were the Christian Democratic Appeal (3), Democrats 66 (3), the Party for the Animals (1), and the Reformed Political Party (1).

Voter turnout was at 46.2%, the highest it had been since 1989. Polling firm Ipsos I&O concluded that of those who had voted for New Social Contract and the Party for Freedom in the November 2023 general election, 59% and 56%, respectively, did not turn out in the European Parliament election. This was 22% for GroenLinks–PvdA.

| Party | Votes | % | Seats | +/– |
|---|---|---|---|---|
| GroenLinks–PvdA | 1,314,428 | 21.09 | 8 | –1 |
| Party for Freedom | 1,057,662 | 16.97 | 6 | +6 |
| People's Party for Freedom and Democracy | 707,141 | 11.35 | 4 | 0 |
| Christian Democratic Appeal | 589,205 | 9.45 | 3 | –1 |
| Democrats 66 | 523,650 | 8.40 | 3 | +1 |
| Farmer–Citizen Movement | 336,953 | 5.41 | 2 | New |
| Volt Netherlands | 319,483 | 5.13 | 2 | +2 |
| Party for the Animals | 281,600 | 4.52 | 1 | 0 |
| New Social Contract | 233,564 | 3.75 | 1 | New |
| Reformed Political Party | 228,036 | 3.66 | 1 | 0 |
| Christian Union | 180,060 | 2.89 | 0 | –1 |
| Forum for Democracy | 155,187 | 2.49 | 0 | –3 |
| Socialist Party | 136,978 | 2.20 | 0 | 0 |
| 50PLUS | 58,498 | 0.94 | 0 | –1 |
| JA21 | 40,570 | 0.65 | 0 | New |
| Pirate Party – The Greens | 23,764 | 0.38 | 0 | 0 |
| Belang van Nederland | 23,032 | 0.37 | 0 | New |
| More Direct Democracy | 11,295 | 0.18 | 0 | New |
| Nederland met een Plan | 8,360 | 0.13 | 0 | New |
| vandeRegio | 2,732 | 0.04 | 0 | 0 |
| Total | 6,232,198 | 100.00 | 31 | +5 |
| Valid votes | 6,232,198 | 99.66 | | |
| Invalid votes | 11,607 | 0.19 | | |
| Blank votes | 9,662 | 0.15 | | |
| Total votes | 6,253,467 | 100.00 | | |
| Registered voters/turnout | 13,542,363 | 46.18 | | |
Source: Dutch Electoral Council

=== European groups ===
Following the election, the PVV switched its affiliation from Identity and Democracy to the newly founded Patriots for Europe group, and newcomers NSC and BBB were admitted into the European People's Party Group.

| Party | Seats | +/– |
|---|---|---|
| Renew Europe | 7 | +1 |
| European People's Party Group | 6 | 0 |
| Patriots for Europe | 6 | New |
| Greens–European Free Alliance | 6 | +3 |
| Progressive Alliance of Socialists and Democrats | 4 | –2 |
| The Left in the European Parliament – GUE/NGL | 1 | 0 |
| European Conservatives and Reformists Group | 1 | –3 |
| Total | 31 | +5 |

=== By province ===
Results by province
| Province | GL- PvdA | PVV | VVD | CDA | D66 | BBB | Volt | PvdD | NSC | SGP | CU | FvD | SP | Others |
|---|---|---|---|---|---|---|---|---|---|---|---|---|---|---|
| Drenthe | 20.4 | 18.5 | 10.2 | 9.9 | 6.1 | 9.9 | 3.3 | 3.5 | 4.6 | 1.7 | 3.8 | 3.0 | 2.5 | 2.5 |
| Flevoland | 16.7 | 21.2 | 11.3 | 7.6 | 6.5 | 6.5 | 3.3 | 4.1 | 3.6 | 6.3 | 4.0 | 3.6 | 2.3 | 3.1 |
| Friesland | 20.2 | 16.9 | 8.2 | 12.2 | 6.3 | 9.1 | 3.2 | 3.5 | 4.0 | 2.0 | 6.3 | 3.3 | 2.4 | 2.4 |
| Gelderland | 20.5 | 15.8 | 10.3 | 9.9 | 7.4 | 6.8 | 4.5 | 4.0 | 3.8 | 6.9 | 3.8 | 2.2 | 2.0 | 2.3 |
| Groningen | 27.4 | 13.7 | 7.8 | 7.8 | 7.7 | 6.0 | 5.0 | 5.7 | 3.5 | 1.8 | 4.8 | 2.6 | 3.8 | 2.3 |
| Limburg | 17.1 | 24.4 | 10.1 | 16.0 | 6.7 | 5.1 | 3.7 | 3.6 | 3.8 | 0.2 | 0.5 | 2.9 | 2.5 | 3.3 |
| North Brabant | 19.1 | 19.4 | 13.7 | 11.6 | 8.9 | 5.3 | 5.0 | 3.6 | 3.6 | 0.9 | 0.9 | 2.2 | 2.7 | 3.2 |
| North Holland | 26.0 | 14.9 | 12.2 | 6.2 | 10.4 | 3.8 | 7.1 | 6.6 | 2.9 | 0.6 | 1.2 | 2.7 | 2.3 | 3.1 |
| Overijssel | 16.5 | 15.9 | 9.2 | 10.8 | 5.8 | 11.1 | 3.7 | 2.9 | 7.7 | 5.3 | 4.9 | 2.3 | 1.7 | 2.0 |
| South Holland | 20.1 | 18.0 | 12.5 | 8.4 | 9.0 | 3.0 | 5.3 | 4.7 | 3.3 | 5.1 | 3.1 | 2.6 | 2.0 | 2.8 |
| Utrecht | 25.2 | 12.5 | 11.3 | 8.1 | 10.6 | 3.2 | 6.9 | 5.3 | 3.1 | 4.5 | 3.8 | 1.8 | 1.6 | 2.2 |
| Zeeland | 15.0 | 16.9 | 10.1 | 10.6 | 5.0 | 8.0 | 2.4 | 3.1 | 3.0 | 15.5 | 3.5 | 2.7 | 2.0 | 2.5 |
| Caribbean Netherlands | 37.8 | 8.9 | 7.8 | 3.4 | 24.5 | 1.6 | 2.6 | 2.0 | 1.1 | 0.5 | 2.8 | 2.8 | 0.9 | 3.3 |
| Postal voters abroad | 31.5 | 9.3 | 13.1 | 4.2 | 13.4 | 2.0 | 8.9 | 4.9 | 2.6 | 1.1 | 1.6 | 3.3 | 1.5 | 2.5 |
