= List of political parties in the Netherlands =

This article lists political parties in the Netherlands. The country has a multi-party system with numerous political parties, and any one party has little chance of gaining power alone; parties work with each other to form coalition governments.

The lower house of the legislature, the House of Representatives, is elected by a national party-list system of proportional representation. There is a legal threshold of 1/150 for getting a seat, so a party can win a seat only with at least two-thirds percent (0.67%) of the national vote, roughly one seat for every 67,000 votes.

The first national political party was the Anti-Revolutionary Party (ARP), founded in 1879.

No party has come close to winning a majority of seats since the introduction of proportional representation in 1918. All governments since then have been coalitions between two or more parties. However, there is a broad consensus on the basic principles of the political system, with all parties having to adjust their goals to some extent in order to have a realistic chance at being part of the government.

== National political parties ==
=== Parties represented in the States General and/or European Parliament ===
Political party	Main ideology	Leader	Affiliation			Seats			Ref.
Political party	Main ideology	Leader	Eur.	EP group	Intl.	Senators	House reps.	MEPs	Ref.
Democrats 66; Democraten 66	Social liberalism	Rob Jetten	ALDE	RE	LI	7 / 75	26 / 150	3 / 31	
People's Party for Freedom and Democracy; Volkspartij voor Vrijheid en Democratie	Conservative liberalism	Dilan Yeşilgöz	ALDE	RE	LI	9 / 75	22 / 150	4 / 31	
Progressive Netherlands; Progressief Nederland	Progressivism	Jesse Klaver	PES	S&D; Greens/EFA	—N/a	14 / 75	20 / 150	8 / 31	
Party for Freedom; Partij voor de Vrijheid	Right-wing populism	Geert Wilders	ID	PfE	—N/a	4 / 75	19 / 150	6 / 31	
Christian Democratic Appeal; Christen-Democratisch Appèl	Christian democracy	Henri Bontenbal	EPP	EPP	—N/a	6 / 75	18 / 150	3 / 31	
JA21	Right-wing populism	Joost Eerdmans	ECR	—N/a	—N/a	2 / 75	9 / 150	0 / 31	—N/a
Forum for Democracy; Forum voor Democratie	Right-wing populism	Lidewij de Vos	ESN	—N/a	—N/a	3 / 75	7 / 150	0 / 31	
Farmer–Citizen Movement; BoerBurgerBeweging	Agrarianism	Henk Vermeer	—N/a	EPP	—N/a	11 / 75	3 / 150	2 / 31	—N/a
Christian Union; ChristenUnie	Christian democracy	Mirjam Bikker	ECPM	—N/a	—N/a	3 / 75	3 / 150	0 / 31	
Denk	Minority interests	Stephan van Baarle	—N/a	—N/a	—N/a	0 / 75	3 / 150	0 / 31	
Party for the Animals; Partij voor de Dieren	Animal welfare	Christine Teunissen	APEU	The Left	—N/a	1 / 75	3 / 150	1 / 31	
Reformed Political Party; Staatkundig Gereformeerde Partij	Christian right	Chris Stoffer	ECPM	ECR	—N/a	2 / 75	3 / 150	1 / 31	
Socialist Party; Socialistische Partij	Democratic socialism	Jimmy Dijk	ELA	—N/a	—N/a	3 / 75	3 / 150	0 / 31	
50Plus	Pensioners' interests	Jan Struijs	EDP	—N/a	—N/a	1 / 75	2 / 150	0 / 31	
Volt Netherlands; Volt Nederland	European federalism	Laurens Dassen	Volt	Greens/EFA	—N/a	2 / 75	1 / 150	2 / 31	
Independent Politics Netherlands; Onafhankelijke Politiek Nederland	Regionalism	Auke van der Goot	EFA	—N/a	—N/a	1 / 75	—N/a	—N/a	—N/a

=== Parties without representation in the States General or European Parliament ===
Party	Main ideology	Leader	Affiliation		Ref.
Party	Main ideology	Leader	EU	Int'l	Ref.
Bij1	Anti-capitalism	Tofik Dibi	—N/a	—N/a	—N/a
Code Orange; Code Oranje	Direct democracy	Bert Blase	—N/a	—N/a	—N/a
Dutch People's Union; Nederlandse Volks-Unie	Neo-Nazism	Constant Kusters	—N/a	—N/a	—N/a
Ouderen Politiek Actief	Pensioners' interests	Vacant	—N/a	—N/a	—N/a
Heart for Freedom; Hart voor Vrijheid	Antivax	Vacant	—N/a	—N/a	—N/a
Belang van Nederland	Classical liberalism	—N/a	—N/a	—N/a	—N/a
Jezus Leeft	Evangelism	Florens van der Spek	—N/a	—N/a	—N/a
LEF – For the New Generation; LEF – Voor de Nieuwe Generatie	Youth politics	Daniël van Duijn	—N/a	—N/a	—N/a
Liberal Democratic Party; Liberaal Democratische Partij	Social liberalism	Sammy van Tuyll	—N/a	—N/a	—N/a
Libertarian Party; Libertaire Partij	Right-libertarianism	Tom van Lamoen	EPIL	LI	
More Direct Democracy; Meer Directe Democratie	Direct democracy	Dorien Rookmaker	EAFD	—N/a	—N/a
Communist Party of the Netherlands; Communistische Partij van Nederland	Marxism–Leninism	Rinze Visser	—N/a	IMCWP	—N/a
Nederland met een Plan	Participatory democracy	Kok Kuen Chan	—N/a	—N/a	—N/a
New Social Contract; Nieuw Sociaal Contract	Christian democracy	Vacant	—N/a	—N/a	—N/a
Pacifist Socialist Party '92; Pacifistisch Socialistische Partij '92	Pacifist socialism	Vacant	—N/a	—N/a	—N/a
Party for the Republic; Partij voor de Republiek	Republicanism	Bruno Braakhuis	—N/a	—N/a	—N/a
Party for Sports; PartijvdSport	Health promotion	Annemarie van Duivenboden	—N/a	—N/a	—N/a
Pirate Party; Piratenpartij	Pirate politics	Mark van Treuren	PPEU	PPI	
Political Party for Basic Income; Politieke Partij voor Basisinkomen	Universal basic income	Sepp Hannen	—N/a	—N/a	—N/a
Trots op Nederland	Conservative liberalism	Sander van den Raadt	—N/a	—N/a	—N/a
Revolutionary Socialist Party; Revolutionair Socialistische Partij	Socialism	Gwildor Sok	—N/a	—N/a	—N/a
Splinter	Secularism	Femke Merel van Kooten	—N/a	—N/a	—N/a
The Greens; De Groenen	Green politics	Mark van Treuren	—N/a	—N/a	—N/a
United Communist Party; Verenigde Communistische Partij	Communism	Engel Modderman	—N/a	—N/a	—N/a
vandeRegio	Regionalism	Sent Wierda	EFA	—N/a	—N/a

== Regional and local political parties ==
=== European Netherlands ===
==== Regional parties ====
Party	Province	Leader	European affiliation	Provincial council seats
Frisian National Party; Fryske Nasjonale Partij	Friesland	Aant Jelle Soepboer	EFA	4 / 43
Groninger Interest; Groninger Belang	Groningen		—	3 / 43
Hart voor Zuid-Holland	South Holland	Richard de Mos	—	1 / 55
Local Brabant; Lokaal Brabant	North Brabant		—	2 / 55
Lokaal-Limburg	Limburg		—	2 / 47
Party for the North; Partij voor het Noorden	Groningen; Friesland; Drenthe		—	Groningen: 1 / 43
Party for Zeeland; Partij voor Zeeland	Zeeland		—	2 / 39
Provincial Interest Fryslân; Provinciaal Belang Fryslân	Friesland		—	1 / 43
Strong Local Drenthe; Sterk Lokaal Drenthe	Drenthe		—	1 / 43
Sterk Lokaal Flevoland	Flevoland		—	1 / 41

==== Local parties ====
Party	Municipality	Main ideology	Leader
Connect Wageningen	Wageningen	Student politics	Cato Vonk
Forza! Netherlands; Forza! Nederland	Multiple	Right-wing populism	Ralph Castricum
The Hague City Party; Haagse Stadspartij	The Hague	Progressivism	Fatima Faïd
Heart for The Hague; Hart voor Den Haag	The Hague	Conservative liberalism	Richard de Mos
Independent Party of Alkmaar; Onafhankelijke Partij Alkmaar	Alkmaar	Localism	Victor Kloos
Livable Rotterdam; Leefbaar Rotterdam	Rotterdam	Fortuynism	Ronald Buijt
Maastricht: Open, Honest, Democratic; Maastricht: Open Eerlijk Democratisch	Maastricht	Student politics	Bram van den Berkmortel
Student & Starter	Utrecht	Student politics	Lars van Rooij
Student and City; Student en Stad	Groningen	Student politics	Wieke van Heteren
Technology Students in Politics; Studenten Techniek In Politiek	Delft	Student politics	Jelle Stap

==== Water board parties ====
Party	Main ideology
General Water Board Party; Algemene Waterschapspartij	Apoliticism
Water Naturally; Water Natuurlijk	Green politics

== Defunct political parties ==
History and evolution of all Dutch political parties to ever have had seats in the House of Representatives.

List of parties that have participated in elections for the House or European Parliament since 1918
Party	Ideology	Founded	Dissolved	Peak vote share	Ref.
Actie Bouwman	Right-wing agrarianism	1934	1940	0.57	
Alliance for National Reconstruction Verbond voor Nationaal Herstel	Authoritarian national conservatism	1933	1941	0.8	
Anti-Revolutionary Party Anti-Revolutionaire Partij (ARP)	Protestant conservatism	1879	1980		
Article 50 Artikel 50	Euroscepticism	2012	2015	0.51	
Catholic National Party	Catholic national conservatism	1948	1955	2.71	
Catholic People's Party	Political catholicism	1945	1980	31.88	
Centre Democrats Centrum Democraten (CD)	Nationalism	1984	2002	2.46	
Centre Party Centrumpartij	Nationalism	1980	1986	0.83	
Centre Party '86 Centrumpartij '86	Neonazism	1986	1998	0.40	
Christian Democratic Party Christen-Democratische Partij	Social protestantism	1905	1930		
Christian Democratic Union Christelijk-Democratische Unie	Christian socialism	1926	1946	2.09	
Christian Historical Party Christelijk Historische Partij	Protestant conservatism	1903	1908		
Christian Historical Union Christelijk-Historische Unie (CHU)	Protestant conservatism	1908	1980		
Christian Historical Voters' League Christelijk Historische Kiezersbond (CHK)	Protestant conservatism	1897	1903		
Christian Social Party Christelijk-Sociale Partij (CSP)	Christian socialism	1907	1926		
Communist Party of the Netherlands Communistische Partij Nederland (CPN)	Marxism-leninism	1901	1991	10.56	
Communist Unity Movement of the Netherlands (Marxist–Leninist) Kommunistiese Eenheidsbeweging Nederland	Communism	1964	1985	0.03	
Communist Workers Organisation (Marxist–Leninist)					
Democratic Party Democratische Partij		1921	1932		
Democratic Socialists '70 Democratisch Socialisten '70 (DS'70)	Conservative social democracy	1970	1983	5.33	
Economic League Economische Bond (EB)		1917	1921	3.11	
Entrepreneurs' Party OndernemersPartij (OP)		2015	2019	0.12	
Europe Transparent					
Evangelical People's Party Evangelische Volkspartij (EVP)	Christian socialism	1981	1991	0.69	
Farmers' Party Boerenpartij	Agrarian right-wing populism	1958	1981	4.77	
Fatherland League	Nationalism	1924	1932		
Free and Social Netherlands	Anti-corona measures	2022	2024		
Free Anti-Revolutionary Party Vrij-Antirevolutionaire Partij (VAR)	Protestant conservatism	1898	1903		
Free-minded Party					
Free-thinking Democratic League Vrijzinnig Democratische Bond (VDB)	Social liberalism	1901	1946	9.06	
Freedom Party Partij van de Vrijheid (PvdV)	Centre liberalism	1946	1948	6.41	
Frisian League Friesche Bond		1898	1908		
General Dutch Fascist League Algemeene Nederlandsche Fascisten Bond (ANFB)	Fascism	1932	1934		
General Elderly Alliance Algemeen Ouderen Verbond (AOV)		1993		3.63	
General League of Roman Catholic Electoral Associations Algemeene Bond van Roomsch-Katholieke Kiesverenigingen	Political catholicism	1904	1926	30.03	
Henk Krol List Lijst Henk Krol	Progressive conservatism	2020	2021	0.09	
Hervormd Gereformeerde Staatspartij	Protestant theocracy	1921	1946	1.06	
Independent Citizens' Party					
Independent Socialist Party					
Islam Democrats Islam Democraten		2005		0.04	
League of Christian Socialists Bond Christen-Socialisten					
League of Communists in the Netherlands					
League of Free Liberals Bond van Vrije Liberalen		1906	1921		
Liberal Party Liberale Partij		1922	1925		
Liberal State Party Liberale Staatspartij (LSP)	Conservative liberalism	1921	1946	9.26	
Liberal Union		1885	1921		
Livable Netherlands Leefbaar Nederland (LN)		1999	2007	1.61	
Middenpartij voor Stad en Land					
Middle Class Party					
National Socialist Dutch Workers Party Nationaal-Socialistische Nederlandsche Arbeiderspartij (NSNAP)	National socialism	1931	1941	0.02	
National Socialist Movement Nationaal-Socialistische Beweging (NSB)	Fascism	1931	1945	4.22	
Nederlands Blok	Nationalism				
Neutral Party					
New National Party Nieuwe Nationale Partij (NNP)	Nationalism	1998	2005		
New Right Nieuw Rechts	Nationalism	2003	2007		
Nida	Islamic democracy				
Nieuwe Midden Partij					
Nieuwe Wegen				0.14	
NLBeter	Healthcare sector interests	2019	2021	0.08	
Pacifist Socialist Party	New Left	1957	1991	3.03	
Party for Human and Spirit / The New Human Partij voor Mens en Spirit / De Nieuwe Mens	Spiritual left	2008	2021	0.28	
Party for Justice, Action and Progress					
Party for Neighbourly Love, Freedom and Diversity	Pedophile rights	2006, 2020	2010, 2022		
Party of the Future / The Party Party Partij van de Toekomst / De Feestpartij	Joke party	2002	2021	0.07	
Peasants' League	Agrarianism	1917	1938		
Pim Fortuyn List Lijst Pim Fortuyn (LPF)	Right-wing populist national liberalism	2002	2008	17.00	
Political Party of Radicals Politieke Partij Radikalen (PPR)	Christian socialism	1968	1990	4.80	
Progressive Integration Party					
Radical League					
Ratelband List					
Reformatory Political Federation	Protestant christian democracy	1975	2003		
Reformed Political League Gereformeerd Politiek Verbond (GPV)	Protestant conservatism	1948	2003	1.77	
Roman Catholic Party of the Netherlands	Catholic conservatism	1972	1985	0.92	
Roman Catholic State Party	Political catholicism	1926	1945	29.64	
Social Democratic Workers' Party	Democratic socialism	1894	1946	23.81	
Social Democratic League	Socialism	1881	1900		
Socialist Party					
Together for the Netherlands Samen voor Nederland	Right-wing populism	2022	2023	0.05	
Ubuntu Connected Front	Ubuntuism	2017	2021	0.02	
Union 55+					
Union of Actualists Verbond van Actualisten	Actualism	1923	1928		
Verbond tot Democratisering der Weermacht				0.51	
VoorNederland		2014	2017	0.36	
Workers Party of the Netherlands Arbeiderspartij van Nederland					

== See also ==
- Politics of the Netherlands
- List of ruling political parties by country
- Liberalism in the Netherlands
- Socialism in the Netherlands
- Christian democracy in the Netherlands
- Republicanism in the Netherlands
- Fascism in the Netherlands
- List of political parties in Aruba
- List of political parties in Curaçao
- List of political parties in Saba
- List of political parties in Sint Eustatius
- List of political parties in Sint Maarten
