= 2026 Dutch municipal elections =

- March 18, 2026; April 30, 2026 (Repeat election in Gorinchem)

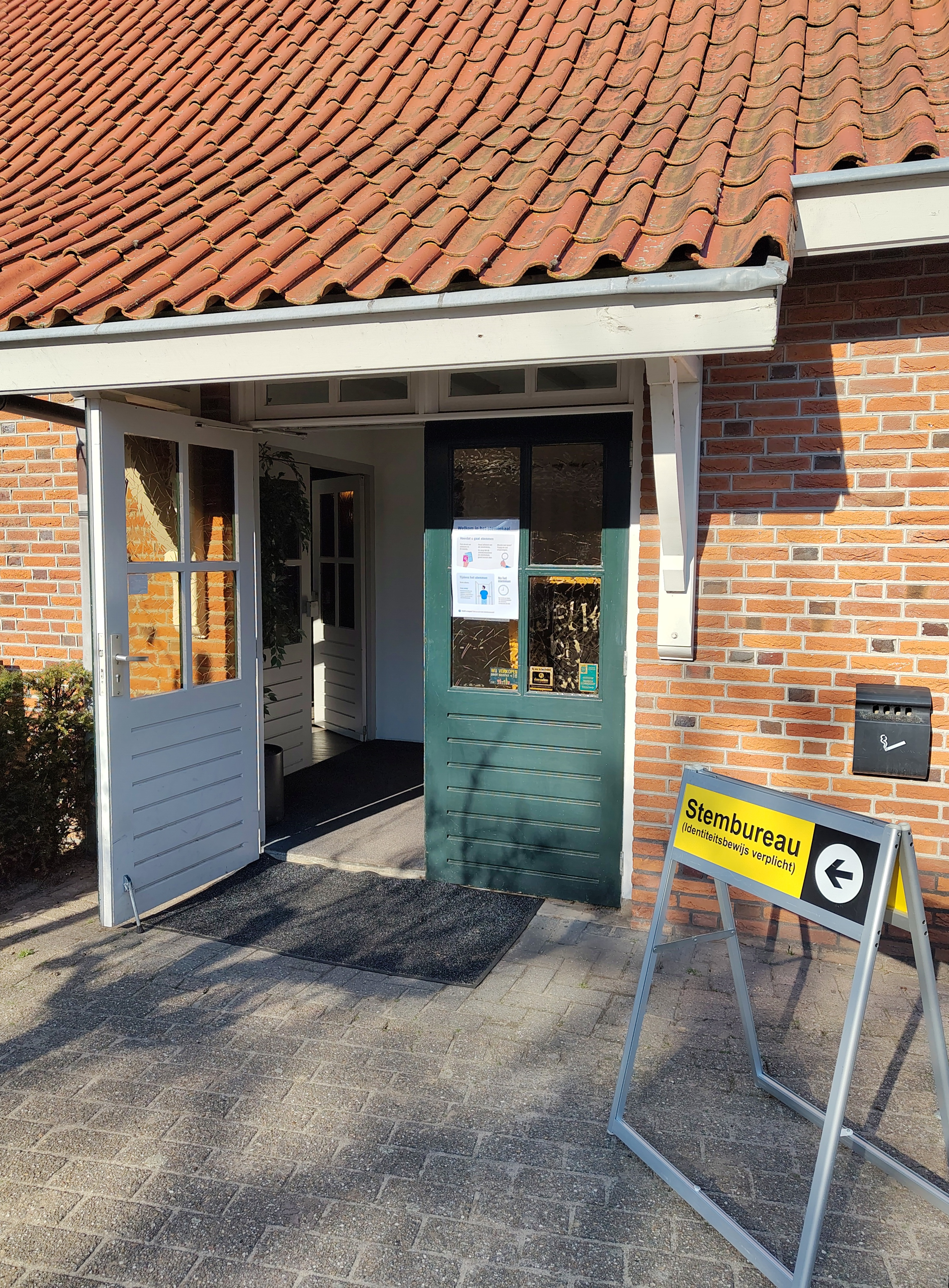
Entrance to a polling place for the 2026 Dutch municipal elections

Municipal elections were held on 18 March 2026 in 333 municipalities in the Netherlands. This election will determine the composition of the municipal councils for the following four years.

== Election process ==
=== Ballot paper size ===
During the 2026 municipal elections, at least eleven municipalities will be experimenting with a smaller ballot paper (A3 format). These are Alphen aan den Rijn, Boekel, Gouda, 's-Hertogenbosch, Leiden, Meierijstad, Midden-Delfland, Nijmegen, Noordoostpolder, Soest and Tynaarlo.

The municipality of Borne previously participated in the experiment, but decided not to participate in these elections due to concerns about the number of invalid votes and the reduced recognizability of candidates.

Both the Ministry of the Interior and Kingdom Relations and the Electoral Council remain positive about the experiment, which should contribute to a simpler and faster voting and counting process.

== National ==
=== Opinion polling ===
Polling firm	Fieldwork date	GL–PvdA	VVD	CDA	D66	CU	SP	SGP	PvdD	FvD	CU–SGP	Denk	PVV	Volt	BBB	50+	JA21	Local parties	Others
2026 election	18 Mar 2026	14.6	11.6	11.1	9.3	2.8	1.9	2.5	1.7	4.0	0.8	1.1	1.2	1.0	0.5	0.8	0.5	33.4	1.2
Ipsos I&O	6–9 Mar 2026	17.3	11.4	8.6	8.7	2.5	1.9	2.3	1.9	3.8	1.1	1.1	2.1	0.8	0.6	0.3	0.3	34.5	0.8
2022 election	16 Mar 2022	17.8	11.7	11.2	8.8	3.9	2.8	2.3	2.0	1.1	1.1	1.0	0.9	0.8	0.6	0.5	0.2	31.3	2.2

=== Results ===
Party	Votes	%	Seats	+/–
Local parties	2,542,374	33.39	3,314	+323
GroenLinks–PvdA	1,109,827	14.58	1,051	–219
People's Party for Freedom and Democracy	885,123	11.63	1,071	+71
Christian Democratic Appeal	847,979	11.14	1,100	–5
Democrats 66	708,261	9.30	656	+36
Forum for Democracy	307,605	4.04	299	+249
Christian Union	211,741	2.78	212	–93
Reformed Political Party	186,857	2.45	256	+27
Socialist Party	146,023	1.92	102	–71
Party for the Animals	127,945	1.68	59	–4
Party for Freedom	92,377	1.21	101	+40
Denk	86,894	1.14	31	+7
Volt Netherlands	74,829	0.98	25	+5
50PLUS	64,407	0.85	39	+15
Christian Union–SGP	61,102	0.80	76	–25
JA21	35,366	0.46	17	+15
Farmer–Citizen Movement	35,304	0.46	38	–21
Frisian National Party	32,127	0.42	41	–8
BIJ1	22,235	0.29	4	–1
BVNL	14,614	0.19	12	–5
D66–GL–PvdA	7,404	0.10	12	–14
Pirate Party	3,256	0.04	1	0
CDA–CU	1,895	0.02	3	New
Party for the Rule of Law	1,773	0.02	1	New
LEF – For the New Generation	1,757	0.02	0	0
New Social Contract	1,718	0.02	0	New
D66–GL	1,141	0.01	2	–10
Peace for Animals	892	0.01	0	New
Libertarian Party	393	0.01	0	New
Ellect	330	0.00	0	New
Netherlands with a Plan	236	0.00	0	New
1 WORLD 1 FUTURE	168	0.00	0	New
Total	7,613,953	100.00	8,523	+93
Source: Kiesraad

== Amsterdam ==
=== Results ===
Party	Votes	%	Seats	+/–
GroenLinks	61,357	17.91	10	+2
Democrats 66	55,069	16.08	8	+1
Labour Party	48,337	14.11	7	-2
People's Party for Freedom and Democracy	37,199	10.86	6	+1
Party for the Animals	20,123	5.87	3	0
Volt Netherlands	17,371	5.07	2	0
JA21	16,665	4.87	2	0
Denk	16,292	4.76	2	0
Bij1	13,002	3.80	2	-1
Christian Democratic Appeal	10,887	3.18	1	0
Forum for Democracy	10,374	3.03	1	0
Socialist Party	10,256	2.99	1	-1
De Vonk	5,428	1.58	0	New
Christian Union	4,471	1.31	0	0
De Stem van Amsterdam	3,990	1.16	0	New
50Plus	2,322	0.68	0	0
Hart voor Amsterdam/Partij van de Ouderen	2,151	0.63	0	New
Pirate Party	1,504	0.44	0	New
Namens Amsterdammers.	1,094	0.32	0	New
Farmer–Citizen Movement	592	0.17	0	New
Partij voor Morgen	436	0.13	0	New
Amsterdamse Alternatieve Alliantie	428	0.12	0	New
LEF – For the New Generation	416	0.12	0	0
Liberaal Collectief Amsterdam	396	0.12	0	New
Libertarian Party	392	0.11	0	New
Het Elan	336	0.10	0	New
ELLECT	266	0.08	0	New
NL Plan	240	0.07	0	New
Partij voor de Rechtsstaat	202	0.06	0	New
Partij voor Betaalbaar Leven	195	0.06	0	New
Partij voor Ontwikkeling	191	0.06	0	New
1 WERELD 1 TOEKOMST (1W1T)	179	0.05	0	New
De Republikeinse Politieke Partij	134	0.04	0	New
De Nieuwe Politiek	132	0.04	0	New
Anti-racistische Moslimpartij	109	0.03	0	New
Total	342,536	100.00	45	–
Source: NOS

=== Opinion polling ===
Polling firm/Commissioner	Fieldwork date	Sample size	PvdA	GL	D66	VVD	BIJ1	PvdD	Volt	SP	JA21	Denk	CDA	FvD	PvdO
2026 election results	18 Mar 2026		8	10	7	6	2	3	2	1	2	2	1	1	
O&S/Het Parool & AT5	9–12 Mar 2026	771	10	8	6	4	2	4	2	2	3	2	1	1	0
O&S/Het Parool & AT5	27 Jan–9 Feb 2026	1,354	9	8	8	4	1	4	2	2	3	2	1	1	0
O&S/Het Parool & AT5	4–12 Mar 2025	846	10	8	6	5	1	4	3	2	2	2	1	0	1
2022 election	16 Mar 2022	—	9	8	7	5	3	3	2	2	2	2	1	1	0

== Rotterdam ==
=== Results ===
Party	Votes	%	Seats	+/–
GroenLinks–PvdA	46,542	22.05	11	+2
Livable Rotterdam	43,248	20.49	11	+1
Democrats 66	22,689	10.75	5	0
People's Party for Freedom and Democracy	20,256	9.60	5	–1
Denk	18,592	8.81	4	0
Forum for Democracy	10,161	4.81	2	+1
Christian Democratic Appeal	7,189	3.41	1	0
Party for the Animals	6,234	2.95	1	–1
Volt Netherlands	6,171	2.92	1	–1
50Plus	5,521	2.62	1	0
Socialist Party	5,055	2.39	1	0
Christian Union	5,074	2.40	1	0
BIJ1	4,195	1.99	1	–1
Rotterdam NEXT	2,437	1.15	0	New
JOU, lijst Verkoelen	2,387	1.13	0	New
Reformed Political Party	1,636	0.77	0	New
Party for Sports	790	0.37	0	New
Beweging Armoedebestrijding	800	0.38	0	0
Peace for Animals	892	0.42	0	New
Wij van de Wijk	690	0.33	0	New
Wij Kleurrijk Rotterdam	538	0.25	0	0
Total	211,097	100.00	45	–
Valid votes	211,097	99.10		
Invalid votes	1,049	0.49		
Blank votes	862	0.40		
Total votes	213,008	100.00		
Registered voters/turnout	525,071	40.57		

=== Opinion polling ===
Pollster	Fieldwork date	Party														
Pollster	Fieldwork date	LR	GL/PvdA	D66	DENK	VVD	FVD	PvdD	BIJ1	CDA	50PLUS	SP	Volt	CU	Other	Lead
2022 result	16 Mar 2022	10	9	5	4	6	1	2	2	1	1	1	2	1	0	1
Peil.nl	15 Mar 2026	10–11	8–9	6–7	3–4	3–4	2–3	1–2	1–2	1–2	1–2	1–2	1–2	0–1	0–1	2
Peil.nl	22 Feb 2026	9–10	8–9	8–9	3–4	3–4	2–3	1–2	1–2	1–2	1–2	1–2	1–2	0–1	0–1	1
D66/ordered by D66	15 Feb 2026	10	9	9	unclear	6	unclear	unclear	unclear	4	unclear	unclear	unclear	unclear	unclear	1
Ipsos I&O/ordered by GLPVDA	15 Feb 2026	16%	21%	15%	10%	9%	unclear	9%	unclear	unclear	unclear	unclear	unclear	unclear	unclear	5%

== Groningen ==
=== Results ===
Party	Votes	%	Seats	+/–
GroenLinks–PvdA	28,817	24.98	13	-2
Democrats 66	14,238	12.34	6	+1
People's Party for Freedom and Democracy	10,286	8.92	4	+1
Party for the Animals	9,337	8.09	4	0
Student en Stad	8,699	7.54	3	0
Christian Democratic Appeal	8,052	6.98	3	+1
Stadspartij 100% voor Groningen	8,046	6.98	3	-1
Socialist Party	7,445	6.45	3	-1
Christian Union	4,428	3.84	2	0
Forum for Democracy	4,284	3.71	1	+1
Party for the North	3,873	3.36	1	-1
Party for Freedom	3,639	3.15	1	0
Volt Netherlands	3,032	2.63	1	+1
Farmer–Citizen Movement	674	0.58	0	New
DURF	499	0.43	0	New
Total	115,349	100.00	45	–
Source: NOS

=== Opinion polling ===
Polling firm/Commissioner	Fieldwork date	Sample size	GL–PvdA	D66	PvdD	Stadsp.	SP	VVD	S&S	CU	CDA	PvhN	PVV	FvD	Volt
OOG/Onderzoekdoen.nl	3–9 Mar 2026	1,759	14	4	3	2	6	3	1	1	4	1	2	2	2
2022 election	16 Mar 2022	—	15 (Note: As GroenLinks (9 seats) and PvdA (6 seats).)	5	4	4	4	3	3	2	2	2	1	0	—

== No elections ==
=== Reorganization ===
In the following municipalities, no regular municipal council elections will be held on 18 March 2026 because they have recently been involved in a reorganization operation:

- Reorganization as of 1 January 2027

In the municipalities of Hilversum and Wijdemeren, redistricting elections will be held on 18 November 2026, if the parliamentary procedure regarding the merger bill is completed in time in 2026.

=== Due to status as a public body ===
The public bodies of Bonaire, Saba, and Sint Eustatius (Caribbean Netherlands) have many tasks that are performed by municipalities in the rest of the Netherlands. However, the island council elections for these public bodies will take place simultaneously with the Provincial Council elections, which will be held for the first time in 2027.

== Aftermath ==
Due to irregularities involving proxy votes, the municipal council of Gorinchem voted to annul the results of the election. According to the NRC, voters (generally members of the Turkish minority) were coerced into giving away their voting passes and printed copies of their identity cards. A repeat election was held on 29 April. In the re-election, D66 lost a seat which was won by the CDA.

== See also ==
- 2026 The Hague municipal election
