= JONG (political party) =

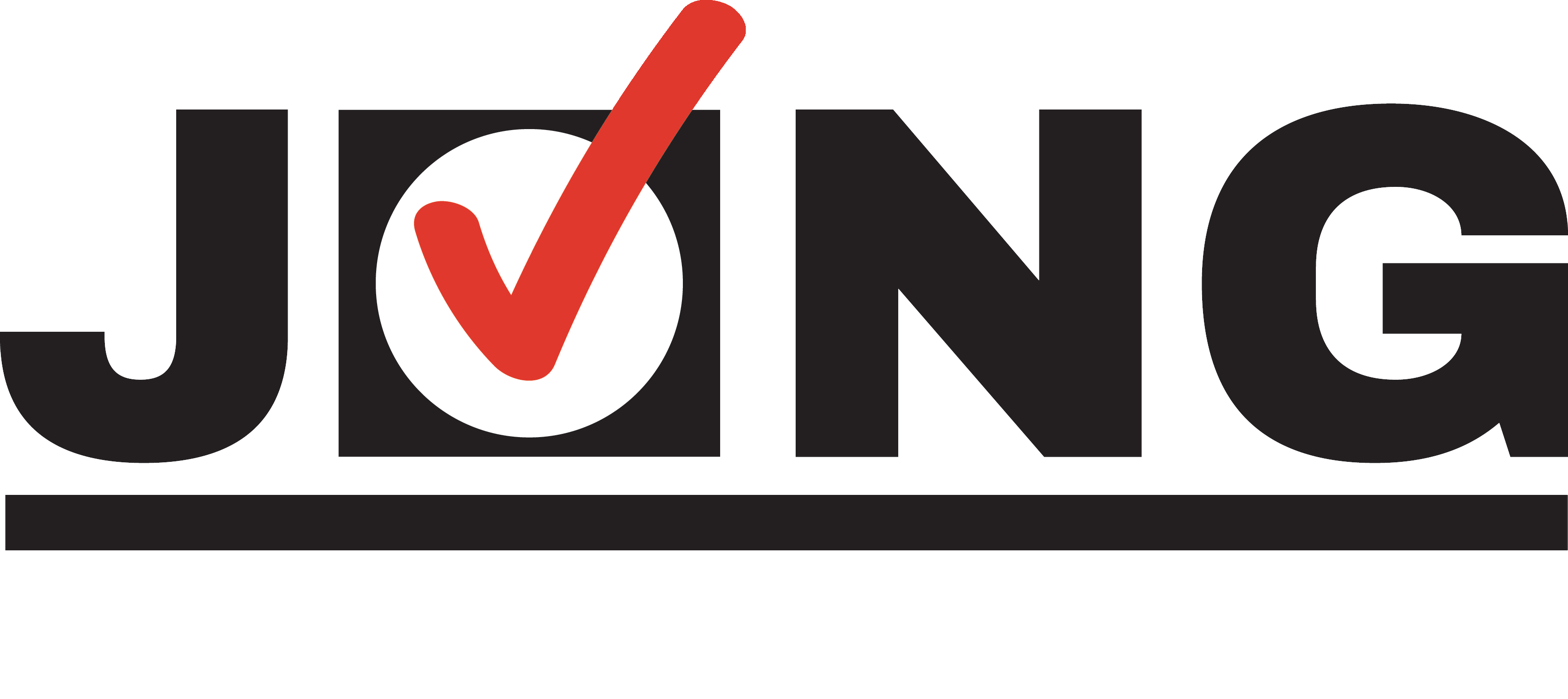
- Leader: Jaron Tichelaar (2020–2021)
- Founder: Jacob de Groot
- Founded: 2017
- Ideology: Youth politics Environmentalism
- Political position: Centre
- Colors: Orange

Website
- jong.vote

JONG (Dutch pronunciation: [jɔŋ]; transl. Young) was a political party in the Netherlands. The party was founded in 2017 by Jacob de Groot from Gaast.

== History ==
The party was founded for youth participation. The party contested the first time during the municipal elections of 2017 in Súdwest-Fryslân after municipal reorganization with De Groot as lead candidate. It received about 100 votes short to win a seat in the council. It also contested in the 2021 Dutch general election, but was unable to win any seats.

== Ideology ==
JONG's three spearheads concerned the climate, education and housing. For example, the party wanted more subsidies for research into innovations in tackling climate change, the abolition of the loan system, a maximum price for student housing and more sustainable homes for starters. In addition, JONG wanted to lower the voting age to 16 and the party preferred a European Union that focuses on tackling migration and climate.

== Electoral history ==
=== House of Representatives ===
Election	List	Votes	%	Seats	+/–
2021	List	15,297	0.15%	0 / 150	Steady

=== Municipal elections ===
Election	Municipality	Votes	%	Seats	+/−
2017	Súdwest-Fryslân	669	2.12%	0 / 37	Steady

== See also ==
- List 17 (formally LEF Association), a young people's party which contested in the 2010 general election
- LEF – For the New Generation, a party for youth interests which stands to contest in the 2023 general election
- Connect Wageningen, a local party for students, young adults, and internationals in Wageningen
- Student & Starter, a local party for students, young people, and first-time homeowners in Utrecht
- Student en Stad, a local students' party in Groningen
- Studenten Techniek In Politiek (STIP), a local students' party in Delft
