= LEF – For the New Generation =

LEF – For the New Generation LEF – Voor de Nieuwe Generatie
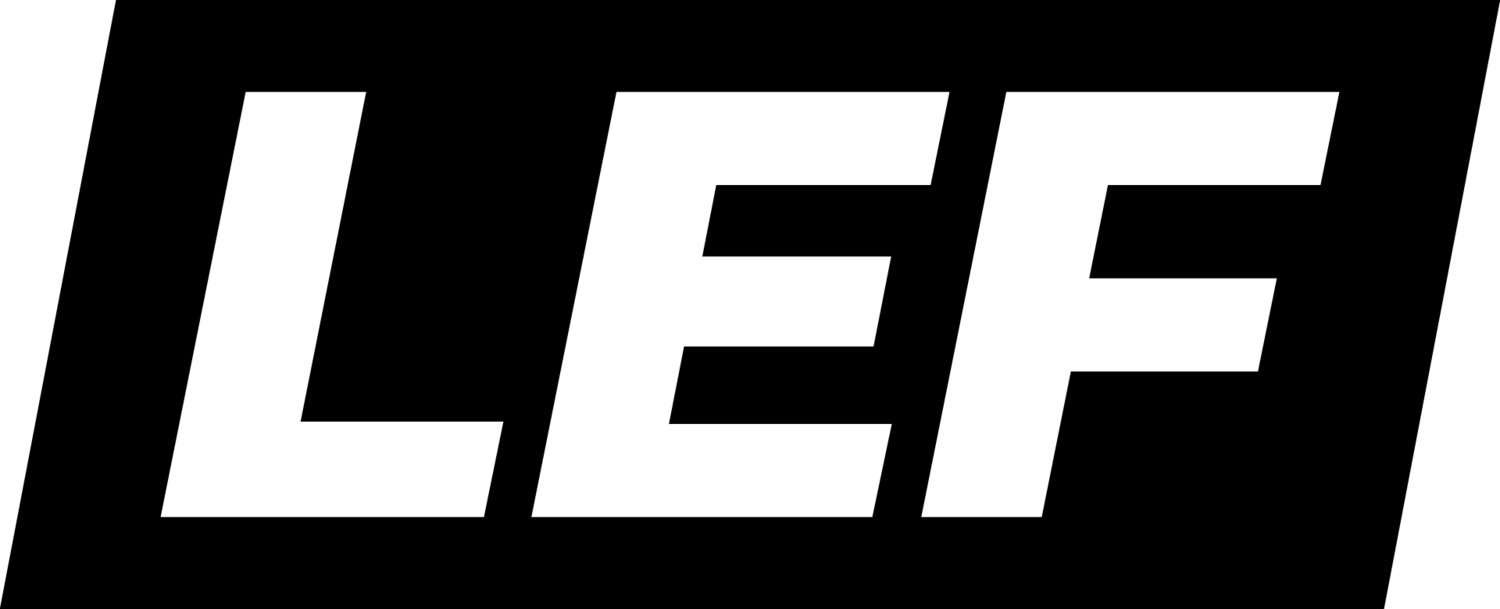
- Abbreviation: LEF
- Leader: Daniël van Duijn
- Founder: Daniël van Duijn
- Founded: 18 December 2020; 4 years ago
- Ideology: Youth politics E-democracy; Environmentalism
- Colors: Purple and black

Website
- lef.nl

LEF – For the New Generation (Dutch: LEF – Voor de Nieuwe Generatie, pronounced [ˈlɛf | voːr də ˈniu.ə ɣeːnəˈraːtsi]), also known simply as LEF (lit. 'courage'), is a political party in the Netherlands focused on youth interests. The party participated in the 2023 House of Representatives elections with Daniël van Duijn as lead candidate, but was unable to win a seat.

== History ==
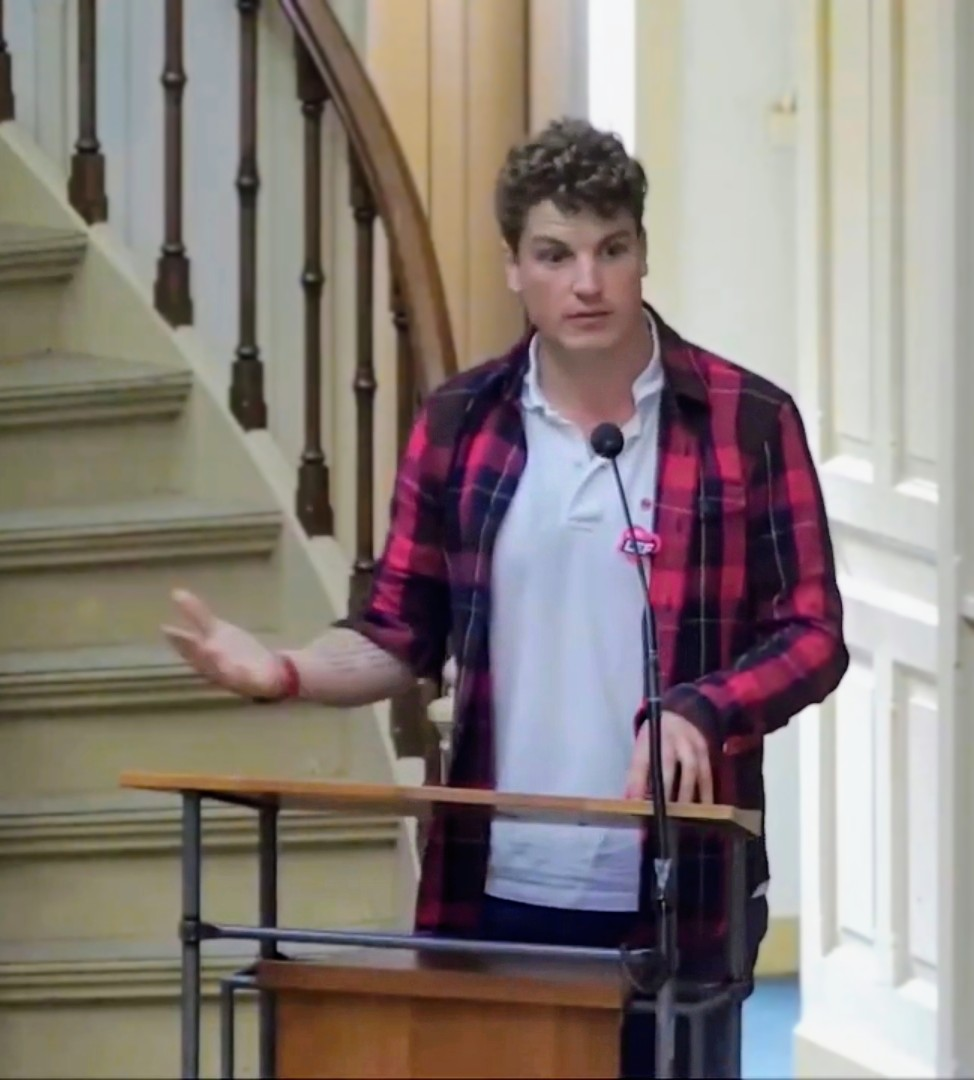
Daniël van Duijn in 2023

The party was founded by party leader Daniël van Duijn in 2020. It participated in the 2022 municipal election in Amsterdam and The Hague, but was unable to win a seat in either municipal council.

The party participated in the 2023 Dutch general election with Van Duijn as its lead candidate. The party received 5,053 votes, not enough for a seat. They chose to campaign solely by performing campaign stunts. One of these had Van Duijn paste the party's poster on the windows of the studio from which Buitenhof was being live broadcast, thereby interrupting an interview with Party for the Animals party leader Esther Ouwehand. While doing this, Van Duijn exclaimed: "Climate is more important than Omtzigt!". Van Duijn also interrupted the final leaders' debate before the elections by stepping up onto the stage, yelling accusations of 'old politics', and told Dilan Yeşilgöz that her VVD party should 'never come to power again'. After this Van Duijn was arrested by police. He was released the next day, on the condition that he would stay away from the House of Representatives on results evening.

== Ideology ==
The party program of the 2023 House of Representative elections listed several key points, such as the implementation of a basic income, citizen councils, lowering the voting age to under 18, and compensating students with student debt. The party furthermore has a general focus on the younger generation, and advocates for stronger climate action.

Party leader Van Duijn made the news when it became clear that he had the party's most important program points tattooed on his forearm by renowned tattoo artist Henk Schiffmacher. It concerned the following points, regarding the 2022 municipal elections in Amsterdam and The Hague:

- Enter basic income (basisinkomen invoeren)
- Loosening real estate (vastgoed losmaken)
- Exciting nightlife (bruisend nachtleven)
- Mental peace (mentale rust)
- Drugs safe (drugs veilig)
- Climate positive city (klimaatpositieve stad)
- Set up citizen councils (burgerraden opzetten)
- Slow down the city (stad onthaasten)
- Quality time (quali-tijd)
- Youth at the table (jeugd aan tafel)

== Election results ==
=== House of Representatives ===
Election	Lead candidate	Votes	%	Seats	+/–	Government
2023	Daniël van Duijn	5,122	0.05 (#23)	0 / 150	New	Extra-parliamentary

=== Municipal elections ===
Election year	Municipal council				
Election year	Municipality	Votes	%	# of overall seats won	+/−
2022
2022	Amsterdam	848	0.26%	0 / 45	New
2022	The Hague	1,618	0.89%	0 / 45	New

== See also ==
- List 17 (formally LEF Association), a young people's party which contested in the 2010 election
- JONG, a party for youth interests which contested in the 2021 election
- Connect Wageningen, a local party for students, young adults, and internationals in Wageningen
- Student & Starter, a local party for students, young people, and first-time homeowners in Utrecht
- Student en Stad, a local students' party in Groningen
- Studenten Techniek In Politiek (STIP), a local students' party in Delft
