= 2026 The Hague municipal election =

- 18 March 2026
- All 45 seats to The Hague municipal council 23 seats needed for a majority
- Turnout: 46.3% (▲3.3pp)
Party	Leader	Vote %	Seats	+/–
HvDH	Richard de Mos	31.1	16	+7
D66	Yousef Assad	15.6	8	0
GL/PvdA	Mariëlle Vavier	15.5	7	−1
VVD	Lotte van Basten Batenburg	7.4	3	−4
Denk	Nur Icar	6.4	3	+1
PvdD	Robert Barker	4.8	2	−1
CDA	Kavish Partiman	4.3	2	−1
SP	Tijmen van Wijngaarden	2.2	1	0
FvD	Robbert van der Meijden	2.1	1	0
Volt	Mylène Tabernal	2.0	1	+1
CU–SGP	Judith Klokkenburg	2.0	1	0
This lists parties that won seats. See the complete results below.
Executive before	Executive after
D66–GL–PvdD–PvdA–CDA–Denk	HvDH–VVD–Denk–CDA

An election for the municipal council of The Hague in the Netherlands was held on 18 March 2026, as part of the 2026 Dutch municipal elections. 45 municipal councillors were elected for a four-year term using party-list proportional representation. The local populist party Heart for The Hague, led by former alderman Richard de Mos, expanded its plurality in the municipal council. The party won sixteen seats, an increase of seven compared to the previous election.

== Background ==
In the 2022 municipal election, the local populist party Heart for The Hague (HvDH) led by Richard de Mos became the largest party. Because of an ongoing investigation into De Mos and fellow HvDH politician Rachid Guernaoui, other parties were unwilling to cooperate with HvDH, and a broad five-party municipal executive was formed comprising the Democrats 66 (D66), the People's Party for Freedom and Democracy (VVD), GroenLinks, the Labour Party (PvdA) and the Christian Democratic Appeal (CDA).

In April 2023, De Mos and Guernaoui were acquitted, and sought to return to the municipal executive, of which they had previously been a part between 2018 and 2019. While D66, VVD and CDA were open to start talks with De Mos, GroenLinks and PvdA were not, stating that they would not provide support to a right-wing coalition. This prompted the VVD to leave the executive on 29 June, which then lost its majority and fell. Nevertheless, no majority could be found for a coalition with HvDH, and the four remaining parties established a new executive along with the Party for the Animals (PvdD) and Denk. After two councillors left the PvdA and CDA groups to join HvDH in November 2024, the coalition lost its majority again, but remained in office as a minority executive.

Two members of the executive left office in 2025: Martijn Balster (PvdA) resigned in March after losing the confidence of caravan residents in his handling of the municipality's caravan policy, while Robert van Asten (D66) resigned in November after being elected to the House of Representatives in the 2025 general election. Important political issues in that year included the extension of the city's zero-emission zone, which was agreed upon in February despite the CDA's scepticism, and the municipality's policy on hotels, which D66 sought to extend, but which was met with criticism from other coalition parties.

== Electoral system ==
The 45 members of the municipal council are elected through semi-open lists under proportional representation in a single constituency. The number of seats per list is determined using the D'Hondt method. The seats won by a list are first allocated to the candidates who, in preferential votes, have received at least 25% of the Hare quota, regardless of their placement on the electoral list. If multiple candidates from a list pass this threshold, their ordering is determined based on the number of votes received. Any remaining seats are allocated to candidates according to their position on the electoral list.

== Contesting parties ==
On 6 February 2026, the central polling station announced that twenty candidate lists would be on the ballot. The table below shows parties that won seats in the previous municipal election.

Name		Ideology	Lead candidate	2022 result		Outgoing seats
Name		Ideology	Lead candidate	Votes (%)	Seats	Outgoing seats
Heart for The Hague	HvDH	Right-wing populism	Richard de Mos	17.0%	9 / 45	12 / 45
GroenLinks–PvdA	GL–PvdA	Social democracy, green politics	Mariëlle Vavier	16.4%	8 / 45	7 / 45
Democrats 66	D66	Social liberalism	Yousef Assad	15.3%	8 / 45	8 / 45
People's Party for Freedom and Democracy	VVD	Conservative liberalism	Lotte van Basten Batenburg	13.3%	7 / 45	6 / 45
Party for the Animals	PvdD	Animal rights	Robert Barker	6.8%	3 / 45	3 / 45
Christian Democratic Appeal	CDA	Christian democracy	Kavish Partiman	6.3%	3 / 45	2 / 45
Denk	Denk	Minority rights	Nur Icar	5.6%	2 / 45	2 / 45
The Hague City Party	HSP	Progressivism	Fatima Faïd	3.5%	1 / 45	1 / 45
Socialist Party	SP	Democratic socialism	Tijmen van Wijngaarden	2.9%	1 / 45	1 / 45
Party for Freedom	PVV	Right-wing populism	Chris Faddegon	2.9%	1 / 45	1 / 45
Christian Union–SGP	CU–SGP	Social conservatism	Judith Klokkenburg	2.7%	1 / 45	1 / 45
Forum for Democracy	FvD	Right-wing populism	Robbert van der Meijden	2.7%	1 / 45	1 / 45

Other parties contesting the election include Volt Netherlands, New Social Contract and 50PLUS.

== Campaign ==
Richard de Mos led Heart for The Hague into the election. Rita Verdonk, who was placed second on the candidate list in the 2022 election, will not seek re-election. Football player Tom Beugelsdijk was placed 15th on the candidate list. In its election platform, the party advocated giving current residents priority for allocating housing, doubling the number of enforcement officers, and scrapping all asylum accommodation except for Ukrainian women and children. De Mos stated he is open to cooperating with any other party after the election.

GroenLinks and the Labour Party (PvdA) contested the election with a joint GroenLinks–PvdA list for the first time, mirroring the national parties' merger process. Alderwoman Mariëlle Vavier served as their lead candidate, while alderman Arjen Kapteijns was not on the candidate list for the municipal council, but is open to another term as alderman.

The Democrats 66 contested the election with a list led by Yousef Assad. The party's election platform emphasised public housing, calling the topic its "absolute top priority". The party also called for the extension of the city's tram tunnel, and placed less emphasis on reducing car traffic than it did in the 2022 election. The party hoped to repeat its national success in the 2025 general election and become the city's largest party. On 24 January 2026, Assad ruled out cooperating with Heart for The Hague after election.

The People's Party for Freedom and Democracy was led by Lotte van Basten Batenburg. Its election platform called for the lowering of municipal taxes, increasing the number of enforcement officers, and boosting housing construction. The party wanted to pay for these investments by cutting 5% of the municipal civil service, which it said would save 50 million euros. Although the party left the municipal executive in 2023 in order to reopen talks with Heart for The Hague, Van Basten Batenburg criticised De Mos' political style in December 2025, and expressed scepticism about the prospect of cooperating after the election.

The Hague City Party suffered a leadership crisis in January 2026, when two party representatives openly criticised Fatima Faïd's leadership of the party. A majority of the party's membership voted to retain Faïd as lead candidate, but several other candidates subsequently withdrew their candidacy.

The Forum for Democracy candidate list was led by 25-year-old student Robbert van der Meijden. The party's third-placed candidate, Timon Busscher, had previously praised Anders Breivik and Brenton Tarrant, made antisemitic remarks, and was recorded singing the Horst-Wessel-Lied. On 5 February 2026, nine parties in the municipal council released a joint statement denouncing Busscher, and ruling out cooperation with Forum for Democracy as long as the party does not distance itself from his remarks.

== Opinion polling ==
Polling firm/Commissioner	Fieldwork date	Sample size	HvDH	GL–PvdA	D66	VVD	PvdD	CDA	Denk	HSP	SP	PVV	CU–SGP	FvD	Volt
Ipsos I&O/NOS	18 Mar 2026		17	8	8	3	2	2	2	0	1	0	0	1	1
Ipsos I&O/Municipality of The Hague	9–22 Feb 2026	1,270	14	9	8	4	3	1	2	0	0	2	1	1	0
Ipsos I&O/Municipality of The Hague	12–25 Jan 2026	1,462	12	8	8	3	2	2	4	0	0	3	1	1	1
No Ties/Omroep West	15–29 Dec 2025	1,011	12	7	8	6	2	2	3	0	1	3	0	1	—
No Ties/Omroep West	14 Feb–4 Mar 2025	1,064	11	9	5	5	3	3	2	1	1	4	0	1	—
2022 election	16 Mar 2022	—	9	8 (Note: As GroenLinks (5 seats) and PvdA (3 seats).)	8	7	3	3	2	1	1	1	1	1	—

== Results ==
Heart for The Hague became the largest party, winning sixteen seats, seven more than the previous election. The Democrats 66 retained its eight seats, while GroenLinks–PvdA won seven, losing one seat compared to the two parties' previous results. The People's Party for Freedom and Democracy lost four seats, retaining just three. Volt Netherlands won its first seat in the municipal council, while The Hague City Party and the Party for Freedom both failed to get reelected.

A number of candidates, all of whom are women, were elected as a result of preference votes. This includes two candidates from the GroenLinks–PvdA list, one from the Party for the Animals list and one from the Denk list. The second-placed Democrats 66 candidate, Marije Mostert, received more preference votes than the party's lead candidate Yousef Assad.

Party	Votes	%	Seats	+/–
Heart for The Hague	62,878	31.10	16	+7
Democrats 66	31,646	15.65	8	0
GroenLinks–PvdA	31,311	15.48	7	–1
People's Party for Freedom and Democracy	14,975	7.41	3	–4
Denk	12,988	6.42	3	+1
Party for the Animals	9,805	4.85	2	–1
Christian Democratic Appeal	8,771	4.34	2	–1
Socialist Party	4,397	2.17	1	0
Forum for Democracy	4,164	2.06	1	0
Volt Netherlands	4,015	1.99	1	New
Christian Union – Reformed Political Party	3,984	1.97	1	0
Drerrie voor Den Haag	2,907	1.44	0	New
Party for Freedom	2,712	1.34	0	–1
50Plus	2,278	1.13	0	0
Blank list (Çetinkaya)	1,954	0.97	0	New
The Hague City Party	1,758	0.87	0	–1
INL Den Haag	669	0.33	0	0
New Social Contract	646	0.32	0	New
Partij voor de Rechtsstaat	237	0.12	0	New
Blank list (Ramdhani)	108	0.05	0	New
Total	202,203	100.00	45	–
Valid votes	202,203	99.35		
Invalid votes	969	0.48		
Blank votes	361	0.18		
Total votes	203,533	100.00		
Registered voters/turnout	438,895	46.37		

== Aftermath ==
As the largest party in the municipal council, Heart for The Hague was given the initiative in the formation a coalition executive. On 24 March, De Mos nominated Ahmed Aboutaleb, former mayor of Rotterdam, as scout, tasked with exploring potential coalitions. On the same day, De Mos expressed his preference for a two-party majority coalition with either Democrats 66 or GroenLinks–PvdA. However, Democrats 66 started it would not commence negotiations before other options were explored and attempted to form a pact with GroenLinks–PvdA in which they would only enter into negotiations with Heart for The Hague together, but GroenLinks–PvdA ruled out a coalition with HvDH. According to Algemeen Dagblad, the most likely alternative was a right-wing coalition consisting of HvDH, CDA, VVD, and Denk, which would hold a narrow majority.

However, on 3 April, Aboutaleb advised that Heart for The Hague and Democrats 66 should open talks for a two-party coalition executive, to which the latter agreed on 8 April, stating "GroenLinks–PvdA had ruled itself out". Talks between Heart for The Hague and Democrats 66 broke down over asylum accommodation on 14 April, resumed two weeks later, but broke down again on 23 May over the same issue. Heart for The Hague insisted on the closure of all asylum accommodations in the municipality, stating that small changes to the existing policy would not do justice to its electoral mandate. Democrats 66 did not go along with this, stating such a move would constitute a violation of the Dispersal Act.

De Mos subsequently opened talks with VVD, CDA and Denk, still led by Aboutaleb. Constructive talks between the four parties continued throughout June. Nevertheless, asylum accommodation remained a point of contention, with Heart for The Hague insisting on phasing out all accommodation, while Denk had previously stated that compliance with the Dispersal Act was non-negotiable. On 3 July, media reported the four parties had reached an agreement, and had drawn up a list of ten new aldermen.

On 10 July, the four parties presented their coalition agreement. On asylum accommodation, the agreement includes the scrapping of a contentious asylum accommodation location, and relocation to smaller alternatives. The coalition intends to comply with the Dispersal Act, but to lobby for its amendment at the national government in order to alleviate pressure on the city. With regard to transport, the coalition aims to halt the extension of parking fees and add additional parking spaces in specific areas. With respect to housing, the agreement retains the existing ambition of building 4,000 new homes per year, and hints at plans to reach 6,000. The housing ambition will include fewer social housing units, mid-range rental properties and affordable owner-occupied homes, and more private-sector homes. It also includes plans to give priority on the housing market to key professional groups, such as teachers, police officers and healthcare workers.

The new municipal executive took office on 16 July. Among the ten aldermen are the four party leaders, municipal councillors Arjen Dubbelaar (HvDH), Ralf Sluijs (HvDH) and Adeel Mahmood (Denk), and Mariëtte van Leeuwen (HvDH), who had served as provincial executive for the Farmer–Citizen Movement (BBB). The opposition criticised HvDH's nomination of former municipal civil servant Henk Harms, who resigned as the director of the city's urban development department in 2020 following an integrity inquiry. In the investiture vote on 16 July, Harms' appointment was supported by a narrow majority of 25 councillors; other nominees were supported by large majorities.
