= AT-5 =

AT-5 may refer to:

- 9M113 Konkurs, a Russian anti-tank missile with the NATO reporting name "AT-5 Spandrel"
- AT-5 Hawk U.S. Army biplane advanced trainer of 1927
- AT5, a local television station in Amsterdam, Netherlands
