= Olave Nduwanje Basabose =

Dutch feminist and author

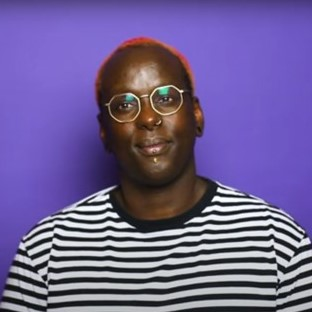
- Born: 1984 (age 41–42); Bujumbura, Burundi
- Occupations: lawyer, writer, activist

Olave Nduwanje Basabose (born 1984) is a Dutch activist, feminist, lawyer, artist and author from Burundi.

== Biography ==
Olave Nduwanje Basabose was born in Bujumbura, Burundi in 1984, the child of a businessman and a princess. Her family left Burundi during the civil war when Nduwanje was 9 years old and came to live in the Netherlands, growing up in Oostzaan. When Basabose was seventeen, her family moved to California, United States. She received her education in Maastrict and Leiden, where she trained as a corporate lawyer. She has done work in the Netherlands to protect the rights of sexual minorities.

Nduwanje was the first black transgender person in the Netherlands to apply for national elections and municipal elections. In 2017 she was a candidate for the House of Representatives elections 2017 for BIJ1 (then Article 1), finishing in ninth place. In 2018 she was a candidate for the municipal elections for the Hague City Party, in tenth place on the list.

In 2020, Nduwanje was named one of the 101 New Talents in the category of Letters by NRC Handelsblad.

Nduwanje identifies as a non-binary transfemme. She previously lived in The Hague, but has lived in Brussels since 2019.
