= Hart voor Den Haag =

Political party in the Netherlands

- Leader: Richard de Mos
- Founders: Richard de Mos; Willem van der Velden; Wil Vonk
- Founded: 2013; 13 years ago
- Headquarters: Spui 70, The Hague
- Ideology: Right-wing populism; Localism
- Political position: Right-wing
- Colours: Green; Yellow
- The Hague municipal council: 12 / 45
- South Holland provincial council: 1 / 55

Website
- www.hartvoordenhaag.nl

Hart voor Den Haag (Dutch: [ɦɑrt voːr dɛn ɦaːx]; lit. 'Heart for The Hague'), also known by its original name De Mos Group (Dutch: Groep De Mos), is a local political party in The Hague, Netherlands. Besides representation in the municipal council of The Hague, it is active in the South Holland provincial council as Hart voor Zuid-Holland.

== History ==
The party was established in 2013 by former PVV member Richard de Mos, former LPF member Willem van der Velden, and former CDA member Wil Vonk. It participated in the 2014 municipal election on a joint list with the pensioners' party Ouderenpartij Den Haag (OPDH). The alliance secured three seats, forming a combined group in the municipal council with two representatives from the De Mos Group and one from OPDH. In April 2017, council member Rachid Guernaoui, formerly of the Democrats 66 (D66), joined the party.

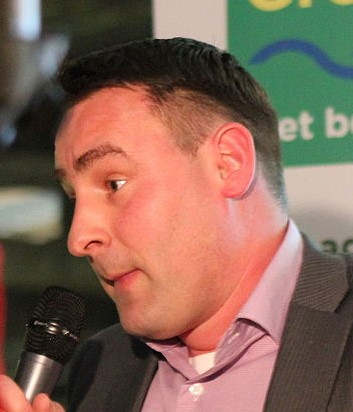
Richard de Mos, founder and leader of the party

Later in 2017, the party announced its intention to adopt the name Hart voor Den Haag. In the 2018 municipal elections, it participated independently under the name De Mos Group/Hart voor Den Haag. With eight seats, it emerged as the largest party in the municipal council. De Mos and Guernaoui subsequently joined the municipal executive alongside D66, GroenLinks, and VVD.

In 2021, the local faction of 50Plus merged with Hart voor Den Haag, increasing its representation to nine seats. Ahead of the 2022 municipal elections, former minister Rita Verdonk stood as the second candidate on the party list, behind De Mos. The well-known local ice cream vendor Moes Pekdemir was listed as a symbolic candidate (lijstduwer). The party retained its nine seats.

On 18 March 2024, South Holland provincial council member Toine Beukering, formerly of JA21, joined the party, establishing its presence at the provincial level under the name Hart voor Zuid-Holland. On 27 November 2024, two council members from the coalition parties Labour Party and CDA defected to Hart voor Den Haag, citing dissatisfaction with the municipal executive's policies and claiming that residents' concerns were being ignored.

== Ideology ==
The party's ideology is commonly described as 'ombuds politics' (Dutch: ombudspolitiek), a term coined by its political leader Richard de Mos. The term refers to the role of a politician or political party as a direct advocate for individual citizens, often in response to complaints or difficulties they encounter in dealing with government institutions. This style of politics is typically reactive and characterised by immediate interaction, with citizens addressing politicians directly. It resembles the function of an ombudsman, but carried out by elected representatives or political organisations.

== Controversies ==
On 1 October 2019, the Public Prosecution Service raided The Hague city hall. Aldermen Richard de Mos and Rachid Guernaoui were suspected of corruption and involvement in two criminal organizations. The party's office was also searched, and both aldermen resigned. De Mos later returned as a council member. The investigation focused on nightlife permits allegedly granted to associates and insider information provided to real estate traders. On 21 April 2023, De Mos was acquitted at first instance. On 21 June 2024, in the appeal brought by the Public Prosecution Service, he was acquitted of corruption but convicted of violating professional secrecy, receiving a conditional fine of €2,000.

In June 2020, the party faced allegations of electoral fraud involving the purchase of voting passes and proxy voting.

== Electoral results ==
=== Municipal council of The Hague ===
Election	Lead candidate	Votes	%	Seats	+/–
2014	Richard de Mos	11,468	5.7	3 / 45	New
2018	Richard de Mos	32,632	16.8	8 / 45	▲5
2022	Richard de Mos	30,988	17.0	9 / 45	▲1
2026	Richard de Mos	62,855	31.1	16 / 45	▲7

== See also ==
- Code Orange (political party)
