= Livable Eindhoven =

Livable Eindhoven ('Leefbaar Eindhoven') is a Dutch local political party for the municipality of Eindhoven.

The party was founded by Ad Pastoor. In 2002, the party won 9 seats in the election for the municipal council. At that moment, it was the biggest party in Eindhoven and formed a coalition with CDA, D66, Ouderen Appèl Eindhoven and Groen Links. In 2006, the party won three seats. In 2010, one seat, and in 2014, two seats.
