= Maastricht: Open Eerlijk Democratisch =

Maastricht: Open Eerlijk Democratisch (also known as M:OED) is a local political party in Maastricht, Netherlands. The party was formed in December 2017 to contest the municipal election in Maastricht. The current party's leader is Martin van Rooij. The majority of the party members are under 35 and either students or employees at the University of Maastricht. M:OED received over 2,800 votes in Maastricht municipal election on 21 March 2018 and got two seats in the municipal council with the highest percentage amongst all new parties in the elections, surpassing Geert Wilders' Party for Freedom.

Maastricht: Open Eerlijk Democratisch describes itself as "open", "honest" and "democratic". The party describes itself as a representative of students, expats and young professionals.

In 2017, M:OED received two seats. Within a year after the election, M:OED's city councillor Simona Maassen left the party keeping her seat. Party founder Alexander Lurvink was made to leave the party by the interim president but remained involved as an independent city councillor. Thereafter, M:OED was effectively no longer represented in the council. In 2022, M:OED was re-elected and ended up with one seat.
