= Henk Schiffmacher =

Dutch tattoo artist

- Schiffmacher in 2014
- Born: 22 March 1952 (age 74); Harderwijk, Netherlands
- Occupation: Tattoo artist
- Spouse: Louise van Teylingen
- Website: tattooing.nl

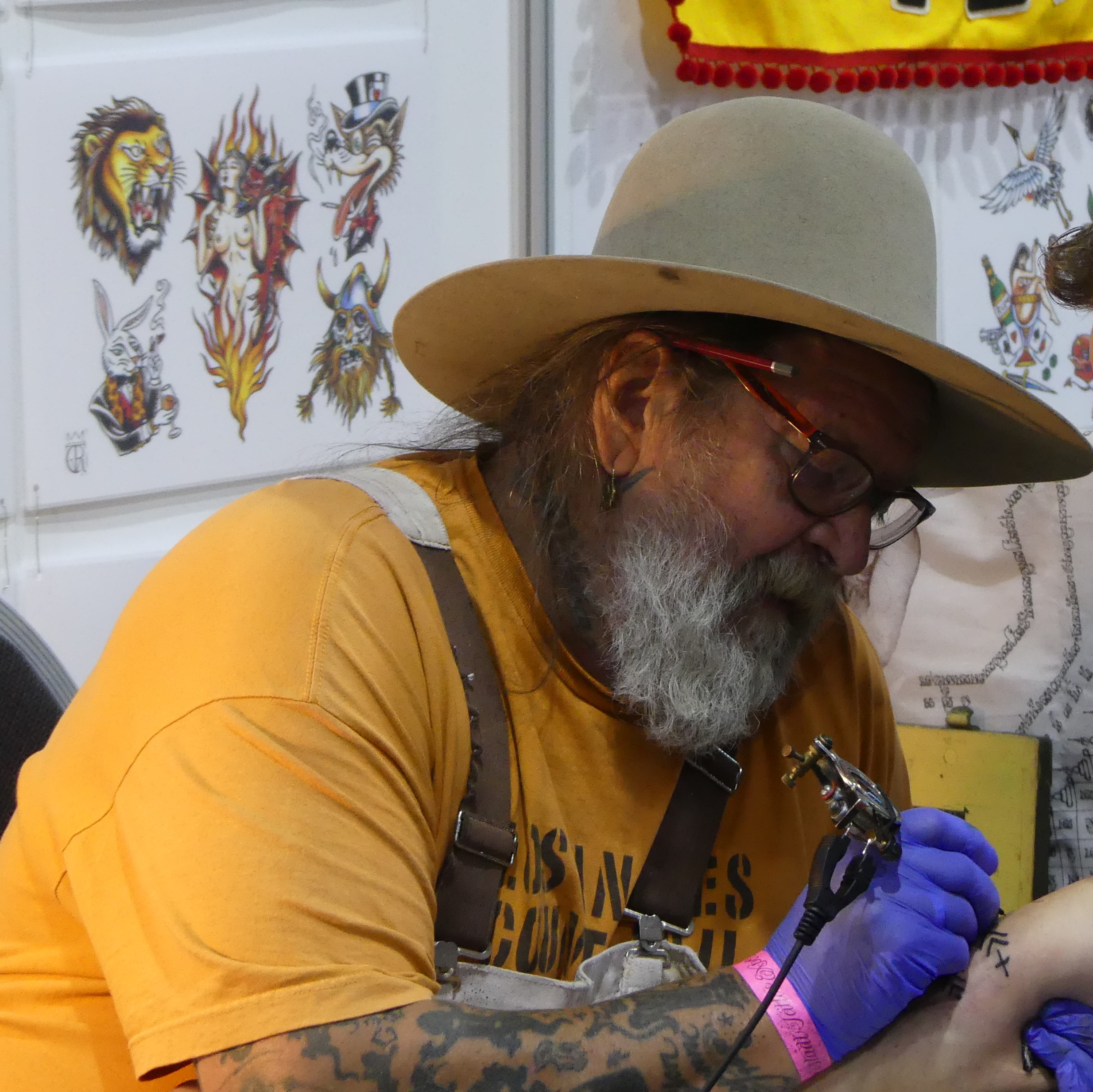
Schiffmacher in 2018

Hendrikus Johannes Everhardus "Henk" Schiffmacher (born 22 March 1952), also known as Hanky Panky, is a Dutch tattoo artist. He is considered an expert within the field of body decoration, having curated exhibitions, written books, and presented television shows on the subject. Schiffmacher has claimed members of the Red Hot Chili Peppers and Pearl Jam, as well as Motörhead frontman Lemmy, to be amongst his clients. RHCP frontman Anthony Kiedis once described Schiffmacher as "an underground philosopher, artist, Hell's Angels associate, booze hound, drug hound, girl hound, an absolute rapscallion of Dutch proportions."

== Biography ==
Born in Harderwijk, Gelderland, Schiffmacher displayed a talent and love for drawing at an early age. In the early 1970s, he studied at the Reclame School REX in Amsterdam. Following stints in various jobs, including employment by Nieuwe Revu as a photographer, Schiffmacher decided to travel. During his travels, Schiffmacher became fascinated by the subject of tattooing, investigating the history of the subject, and upon his return to Amsterdam this fascination led to him opening a tattoo parlour.

Schiffmacher also began to organise tattoo conventions and later wrote on the subject, resulting in the books Tattoos, published in 2001, and 1000 Tattoos, published in 2005. During this period, Schiffmacher also presented a documentary about tattoos, released on DVD in the Netherlands as World of Tattooing in 2004. In 2004, the exhibition Wear Your Dreams, curated by Schiffmacher, opened at the Aboriginal Art Museum in Utrecht. Schiffmacher explained the title as a literal reading of the art of the tattoo and what it means in aboriginal culture: "These people have nothing. Everything they hold, they carry within. They only cover themselves for important events and rituals by using body decorations, thus revealing thoughts and ideas." Schiffmacher then turned to painting; an exhibition of his paintings was held in Antwerp, Belgium, in 2004.

In 2000, Schiffmacher took part in the celebrity version of the Dutch Big Brother, Big Brother VIPS.

In June 2006, Schiffmacher sued the Amsterdam clothing company, 10Feet, alleging they had used his images upon their t-shirts without permission. The court ruled for Schiffmacher on all counts and ordered 10Feet to cease printing the t-shirts, fining the company 500 euro per summary infringement to a maximum of 25,000 euro.

In September 2007, the Schiffmacher's starred in a TV show on Dutch channel AT5 about their lives and on 29 September 2007 the opening for the second Hanky Panky tattoo shop in Amsterdam for his daughter Morrison took place.

In December 2019, both Henk Schiffmacher and his wife Louise Schiffmacher launched an apparel brand called PYF Ink. Creating garments with artwork drawn and designed by the Schiffmacher's for men and women.

In 2021, he was chosen by the Amsterdam municipal health service to design the Covid-19 vaccine plaster used in vaccination centres.
