= Arnoud van Doorn =

Dutch politician (born 1966)

Personal details
- Born: 18 March 1966 (age 60) The Hague, Netherlands
- Party: Party for Freedom (until 2012)
- Children: Iskander Amien De Vries (eldest son)
- Occupation: Politician

Arnoud van Doorn (born 18 March 1966, in The Hague) is a Dutch politician. He was a member of the Dutch Freedom Party (PVV) before converting to Islam.

== Political career ==
Arnoud van Doorn used to be part of the PVV. In December 2011, the party broke with Van Doorn.

He decided to become a Muslim a few months later and announced his conversion to Islam in April 2012. Soon after, he performed Hajj to Saudi Arabia and visited the Prophet's Mosque. He said that the overwhelming reaction of Muslims around the world against the film Fitna made him interested to learn more; all this led to his decision to convert to Islam. He stated, "Right now I am still feeling regret for having distributed the film. I have a responsibility to correct the mistakes that I've made in the past".

Later, his eldest son, Iskander Amien De Vries, followed him in converting to Islam in 2014.

Until May 2014, he served as a member of The Hague City Council for the PvdE, a political party based on Islam. At the moment he is President of the European Da'wah Foundation, and Ambassador of Celebrity Relations for the Canadian Da'wah Association in Europe. He is a Member of the Board and Official Representative for the PvdE in the city council of The Hague.

In February 2014, Van Doorn was sentenced to 40 hours of community service and a fine of €1000 for leaking secret documents to the press, possession of an illegal flare gun, and selling soft drugs to minors. In May 2015, following an appeal by the prosecutor, this sentence was increased to 240 hours of community service, with a three-month suspended jail term. Van Doorn claimed to have sold the soft drugs in order to catch a drug dealer, but the judge described his explanation as "highly implausible".

On 6 August 2018, Willie Dille, a Dutch politician, published a video on Facebook announcing her departure from the city council and alleging the Mayor for searching for charges against her and Van Doorn for organizing a group of Moroccans for abducting and abusing her in March 2017. The next day, she said the assertions were done under "impulse" – the police, having investigated, did not find evidence of such an organization. On 8 August, she died by suicide after apologizing to her loved ones on Facebook.

On 26 September 2021, Van Doorn was arrested in the Hague and held overnight on the suspicion of preparing an assassination attempt on Dutch Prime Minister Mark Rutte. He was released without charge the next day.

== See also ==
- Joram van Klaveren
