= 10 feet =

Dutch fashion label

10Feet
- Industry: Clothing
- Founded: 1990s
- Headquarters: Amsterdam, Netherlands
- Products: Family fashion and accessories
- Website: 10feet.nl

10Feet is a Dutch fashion label and subsidiary of Herb Industries based in Amsterdam. It was founded in the late 1990s and now has 250 retail outlets in the Netherlands.

In June 2006, Henk Schiffmacher, a tattoo artist, sued the company, alleging it had used his images on their T-shirts without permission. The court ruled for Schiffmacher on all counts and ordered 10Feet to cease printing the T-shirts, fining the company 500 euros per summary infringement to a maximum of 25,000 euro.
