= Richard de Mos =

Dutch politician

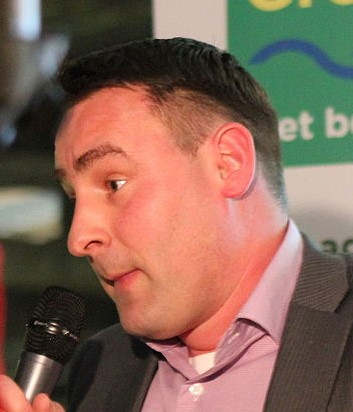
- De Mos in 2013

Municipal councillor of The Hague
- Incumbent
- Assumed office 7 November 2019
- In office 11 March 2010 – 7 June 2018
- Parliamentary group: Hart voor Den Haag

Water board member of Delfland
- Incumbent
- Assumed office March 2023
- Parliamentary group: Belang van Nederland

Alderman of The Hague
- In office 7 June 2018 – 16 October 2019

Member of the House of Representatives
- In office 1 September 2009 – 20 September 2012
- Parliamentary group: Party for Freedom

Personal details
- Born: 5 May 1976 (age 49) Delft, Netherlands
- Party: Hart voor Den Haag; Belang van Nederland
- Other political affiliations: Party for Freedom (until 2012); Code Orange (2019–2021)

Richard de Mos (born 5 May 1976) is a Dutch politician and teacher. He served as a member of the House of Representatives from 1 September 2009 to 20 September 2012 on behalf of the Party for Freedom (PVV). Since 2013, he has been the leader of the local political party Hart voor Den Haag. In addition, De Mos served as lead candidate for Code Orange (CO) in the 2021 general election, and for Belang van Nederland (BVNL) in the 2023 water board election in Delfland.

== Biography ==
=== Early career ===
A native of Delft, De Mos grew up in Hook of Holland. He taught in a primary school in the Spoorwijk neighbourhood in The Hague. In the 2006 general election, he was placed tenth place on the Party for Freedom list. In 2007, he became policy officer of Martin Bosma, a member of the House of Representatives for the PVV.

=== House of Representatives ===
De Mos became a member of the House of Representatives in 2009, succeeding Barry Madlener, who had been elected into the European Parliament. In the House of Representatives, he focused on matters of environmental policy, climate change, waterways, day care and taxicab policy. Although re-elected in 2010, De Mos was not selected to contest in the 2012 general election by party leader Geert Wilders.

In the 2021 general election, De Mos attempted to return to the House of Representatives as lijsttrekker of the party Code Orange. Receiving 0.4% of the vote, the party did not win any seats. In August 2021, he became a member of Belang van Nederland founded by former FvD politician Wybren van Haga.

=== Local politics in The Hague ===
On 11 March 2010, he became a member of the municipal council of The Hague, initially for the Party for Freedom, later as an independent. He participated in the 2014 municipal election with the joint list Groep De Mos/Ouderenpartij, which won three seats in the municipal council.

His party, renamed Groep de Mos/Hart voor Den Haag in 2017, grew to eight seats in the 2018 municipal election, becoming the largest party. He subsequently became First Deputy Mayor of The Hague and alderman for economic affairs, sport and public space. On 1 October 2019, his offices were raided by the Dutch intelligence police as part of an investigation into alleged corruption. He was subsequently removed from office through a motion of no confidence. He called his political fall a "mini-coup". In April 2023, De Mos was acquitted of all charges.
