= Studenten Techniek In Politiek =

STIP Studenten Techniek In Politiek
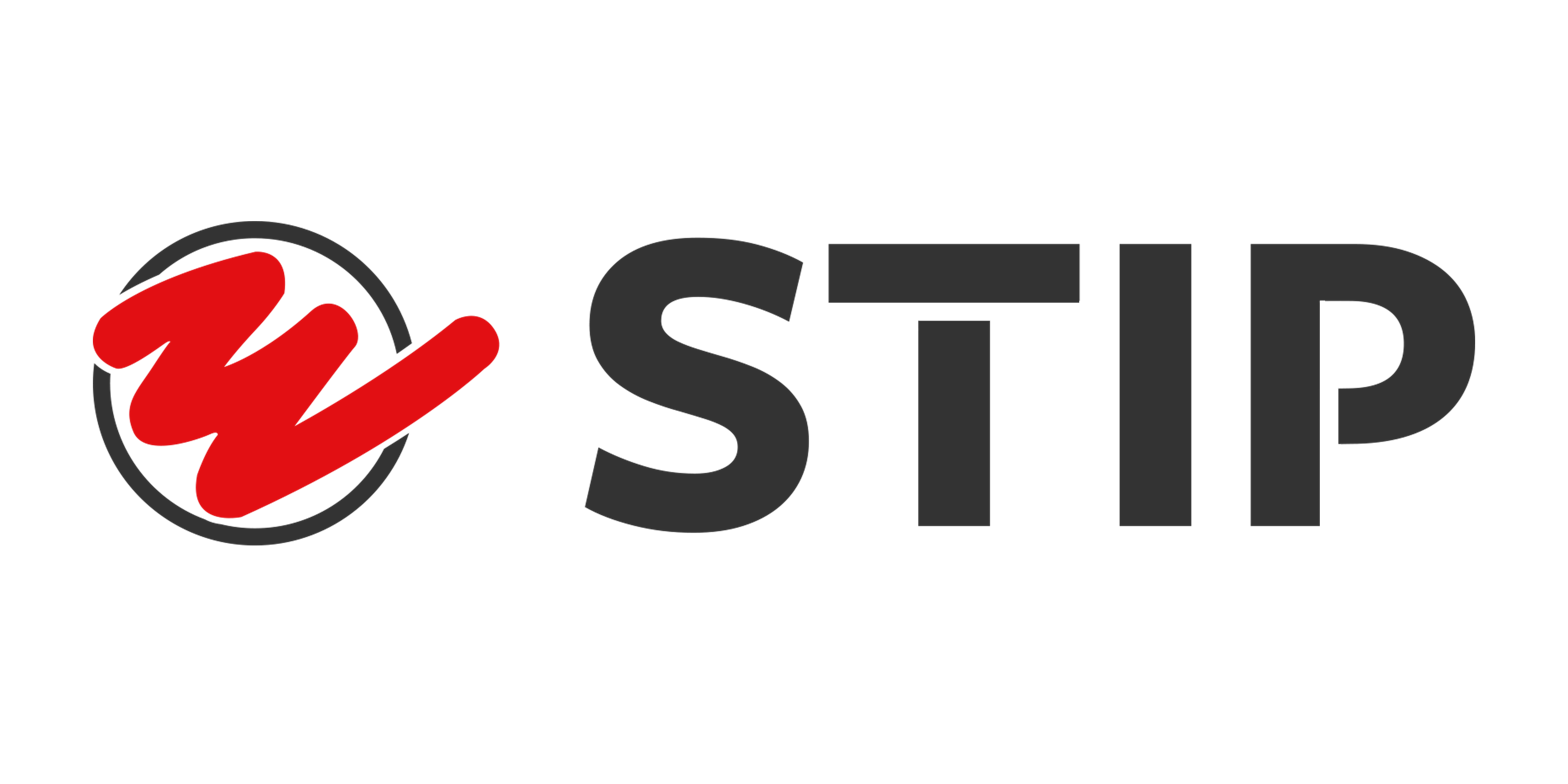
- Leader: Jelle Stap
- Chairman: Rohan Ramnathsing
- Founded: November 1993
- Headquarters: Delft
- Ideology: Localism; Student politics Pragmatism
- Political position: Big tent
- Colours: Yellow and red
- Delft Municipal Council: 6 / 39

Website
- stipdelft.nl

Studenten Techniek In Politiek (STIP, "Technology Students In Politics") is a local political party in the municipality of Delft in the Netherlands.

== History ==
STIP was founded in 1993 and is run exclusively by students. The members of STIP rotate their seats after one year in municipal council (instead of the regular term of four years) to combine their elected position with their studies. STIP is a unique democratic example of student involvement in local politics. First elected in 1994, STIP had steadily grown its representation on the municipal council.

After the election victory in 1998 STIP was invited to join the ruling coalition and get a seat on the executive council (College van Burgemeester en Wethouders). Since then they have consistently remained part of the ruling coalition. STIP is the only student party in the Netherlands with a representation on the local executive council.

== Ideology and electorate ==
STIP has no clearly defined political ideology and self-describes itself as pragmatic. However its raison d'être is improving the relationship between students and 'regular' citizens of Delft in general, and specifically improving the relationship between the Delft University of Technology and the City of Delft. Their platform calls for investments in sustainability, local high tech start-ups and cultural activities. STIP is not affiliated with a national political party. In the last years STIP has been part of local majority coalitions together with the PvdA, VVD, GroenLinks and D66.

In many student cities there are conflicts between the 'regular' population of the city and the student population. Often this conflict remains unresolved partly because of under-representation of students within official representative organs such as the municipal council. The concept of a student party as a way to increase student representation in local government was named as one of the best case practices to increase student friendliness of European cities.

Overwhelmingly the electorate of STIP consists of students, concentrated in the old city centre of Delft and the campus of the Delft University of Technology.

== Election results ==
Election	Votes			Seats		Government
Election	#	%	±	#	±	Government
1994	2,111	4.6%	New	1 / 37	New	Opposition
1998	2,524	5.8%	▲1.2%	2 / 37	▲1	Coalition
2002	3,698	8.2%	▲2.4%	3 / 37	▲1	Coalition
2006	3,026	7.0%	▼1.2%	2 / 37	▼1	Coalition
2010	3,287	8.0%	▲1.0%	3 / 37	▲1	Coalition
2014	5,072	11.6%	▲3.6%	4 / 37	▲1	Coalition
2018	6,677	14.8%	▲3.2%	6 / 39	▲2	Coalition
2022	6,745	15.8%	▲1.0%	6 / 39	0	Coalition

== See also ==
- Studenten voor Leiden (Similar party in Leiden)
- Student & Starter (Similar party in Utrecht)
- Student en Stad (Similar party in Groningen)
- Connect Wageningen (Similar party in Wageningen)
- Municipal politics in the Netherlands
