= List of political parties in Sint Eustatius =

This article lists political parties in Sint Eustatius. Sint Eustatius has a multi-party system with few political parties.

== Parties ==
=== Active Parties ===
- Democratic Party (DP)
- Progressive Labour Party (PLP)
- Statia’s Liberal Action Movement (SLAM)
- St. Eustatius Empowerment Party (STEP)
- United People's Coalition (UPC)

=== Defunct Parties ===
- Sint Eustatius Alliance (SEA)
- Windward Islands People's Movement (WIPM) - no longer active in Sint Eustatius. Still active in Saba.

== See also ==
- List of political parties by country
