= List of political parties in Saba =

This article lists political parties in Saba. Saba has a multi-party system with few political parties.

== Parties ==
=== Active Parties ===
As of 2023 elections, these were the names of active parties on the lists on nomination day.

Party	Abbr.	Ideology	Council
Saba Caring People Party			0 / 5
Windward Islands People's Movement	WIPM	Christian democracy	3 / 5
Saba Labour Party (Note: Despite playing a role as a major opposition party to the WIPM until 2019, they did not submit any lists on nomination day in 2023, so they were out in the 2023, however they did not say they were inactive.)	SLP		0 / 5
The Party for Progress Equality and Prosperity	PEP	Progressivism, Egalitarianism	2 / 5

=== Defunct Parties ===
- Saba United Democratic Party (SUDP): A descendant party of the SDLM party, that was in the late 90s. It also participated in the 2003 elections.
- Saba Democratic Labour Movement (SDLM) or Saba Democratic Labor Party(SDLP):precursor to the SUDP party, active opposition to the WIPM in 1995, which briefly led to the party to become ruling power. Active in the late 80s and early 90s, and participated in 1987, 1991,1995 elections.
- Saba United Party (SUP): active in the late 80s.
- Democratic party: a party that existed in the 1983 Netherlands Antilles island council elections for saba.
- Saba True Labour Party: a party that existed in the 1987 Netherlands Antilles island council elections for saba.
- Democratic Party of Saba:Party that existed in the 1999 elections.
- Saba people's party: party that existed in the 1975 elections.

== See also ==
- List of political parties by country
