= Connect Wageningen =

- Leader: Melissa van der Lingen
- Chairman: Tycho Jongenelen
- Founded: 2017
- Headquarters: Wageningen
- Ideology: Localism; Student politics Syncretic politics
- Political position: Big tent
- Colours: Blue-green; White
- Wageningen Municipal Council: 2 / 25

Website
- connectwageningen.nl

Connect Wageningen is a local political party in the city of Wageningen. It was founded in 2017 by Mark Reijerman, a former councillor for the Stadspartij Wageningen. The aim of Connect Wageningen is to represent young people, students and internationals in Wageningen, which is home to the Wageningen University and Research (WUR).

== Politics ==
In its electoral program Connect Wageningen cites the construction of more affordable housing as their number one priority. Other priorities are the improvement of public transport in the city, a more comprehensive social integration program for newcomers, including free Dutch and English language classes and the development of a sustainable and circular local economy.

== Election results ==
Year	Votes	%	+/–	Seats	+/–	Lead candidate
2018	1,292	6.8%	New	2 / 25	▲2	Mark Reijerman
2022	1,931	10.2%	▲3.4	2 / 25	0	Sarah Alen
2026	1,092	5.0%	▼5.2	1 / 27	▼1	Stef de Warle

== See also ==
- Student & Starter
- STIP
- Student en Stad
