= Islam Democrats =

Islam Democrats Islam Democraten
- Abbreviation: ID
- Leader: Hasan Kucuki
- Founded: 2006
- Dissolved: 2022
- Merged into: Denk
- Ideology: Islamic democracy
- Religion: Islam
- Colors: Green
- The Hague municipal council: 0 / 45

Website
- http://www.islamdemocraten.nl/

The Islam Democrats (Dutch: Islam Democraten, ID) is an Islamic democratic political party in the Netherlands which currently has no seats in the Hague council as of the 2022 Dutch municipal elections.

== History ==
=== Origin ===
After obtaining the council seat in The Hague, the ID participated in the parliamentary elections of 2006 in the List 21 in the electorals of The Hague, Leiden, Rotterdam, Utrecht, Arnhem, Tilburg and Dordrecht. ID then got 4,339 votes, with no representation in parliament.

In November 2006, the Islam Democrats filed a complaint against the One NL, after party leader Marco Pastors had compared the Islamization of the Netherlands with the rise of the Nazis in the 1930s in a radio commercial just before the elections to the House of Representatives. Pastors had indicated in an ad that, in his opinion, the establishment looked the other way in the 1930s when the National Socialists emerged, and that the same is now happening with Islamization. Islam Democrats felt hurt by this contrast. However, the judge ruled that Pastors did not have to retract his ruling. Pastors also did not take back his words, stating that he only wanted to start a discussion with political opponents with the comparison.

In 2007, ID took part in the Provincial Council elections 2007 in South Holland, without winning a seat.

=== Separation ===
At the beginning of 2010, there was a rift between the association board and the council faction. The party tore in two. Councilor Abderazak Khoulani, a Moroccan-Dutch insurance adviser, accused the association board of a lack of democratic values and criticized the way in which the new list of candidates for the municipal elections was compiled. The ID council faction decided to continue independently and Khoulani founded the Party for Islamic Democrats (PID), with which he had wanted to participate in the municipal elections. However, the central electoral committee of The Hague thought that name was too much like Islam Democrats seem. Ultimately, Khoulani took over with the Unity Party participated in the municipal elections in The Hague, alongside the ID and the Dutch Muslim Party.

On March 3, 2010, both the Islam Democrats and the new party of former ID councilor Khoulani managed to get enough votes for a seat in the Hague city council. The Hague was therefore the only Dutch municipality with two Islamic council factions. In September 2013, former PVV councilor Arnoud van Doorn, a convert to Islam, joined Khoulani in his list.

The Islam Democrats in The Hague municipal council are merging with Denk. Both parties state that they largely share the same voter base and ideals. With the merger, they aim to combat the fragmentation of the political landscape. They also call on other parties, such as NIDA, to join Denk.

== Controversy ==
In February 2010, the Islam Democrats made the news after photos of a young family member with pistols appeared on a website of the new party leader Dilaver Delikaya. According to Delikaya, these photos should not have been on the internet and he has therefore removed them.

In early March 2010, on the eve of the elections, the party again became discredited after another candidate ID councilor, Naser Hegiel, knocked a man unconscious over an argument over election leaflets. The victim had to be hospitalized with a broken hand, among other things, and subsequently filed a complaint against Islam Democrat Hegiel.

== See also ==
- List of Islamic political parties
