= Actie Bouwman =

Actie Bouwman (also known as Action for the Small Farmer, Dutch: Actie voor de Kleine Boer) was a political party in the Netherlands. The party was led by Alphons Bouwman, a RKSP member. The party drew its support from rural Catholic sectors. It emerged after large-scale dissatisfaction amongst Catholic farmers towards the Northern Brabant Christian Farmers League (NCB) during the agrarian economic crisis of 1933.

The party was founded in 1934. In February, the party changed its name to the Christian Organisation of Self-employed Persons (Dutch: Christelijke Organisatie van Kleine Zelfstandigen). The party expanded rapidly during 1935, during which the party had 110 branches and 20,000 followers. Thousands visited during 1935.

In 1937, the party was radicalized. In 1940, it merged into the Agrarian Front of the National Socialist Movement, in which Bouwman became an important leader.
