= Student & Starter =

- Leader: Ruben Snijder
- Founded: 26 November 2012
- Headquarters: Utrecht
- Ideology: Localism; Student politics Civil libertarianism Environmentalism
- Utrecht Municipal Council: 2 / 45

Website
- studentenstarter.nl

Student & Starter (S&S or StuSta) is a local political party in the city of Utrecht. Student & Starter was founded in 2013 and is run by students and post-graduates.

== History ==
As of today, S&S is one of four successful student parties being able to win seats in a municipal council in the Netherlands. The councillors of this local political party rotate their seats after one or two years in the municipal council (instead of the regular four-year term). This is done both for practical reasons, but also to introduce new ideas to the municipal council. The party is closely related to other Dutch student parties such as STIP in Delft and Student en Stad in Groningen.

== Ideology ==
S&S has no specific ideology, since its members come from a broad range of ideologies and national parties. They are united by the need for a local, independent voice for young people in Utrecht. During the municipal election of 2014 the party chose three key features in their programme: more affordable housing, especially for students and youth in general, more employment for the recently graduated and lastly investments in public transport and facilities for bicycles. Their election campaign in 2018 had a similar set of policies and principles.

== Elections ==
Year	Votes	%	+/-	Seats	+/-	Lijsttrekker
2014	4,993	3.7%	New	1 / 45	New	Steven Menke
2018	6,445	4.1%	▲0.4%	2 / 45	▲1	Tim Homan
2022	8,536	5.4%	▲1.3%	2 / 45	0	Esma Kendir

== See also ==
- Student activism
- Students' union
- Youth participation
- Youth engagement
- Municipal politics in the Netherlands
- Connect Wageningen
- Studenten Techniek In Politiek
- Student en Stad
