= Haagse Stadspartij =

Political party in the Netherlands

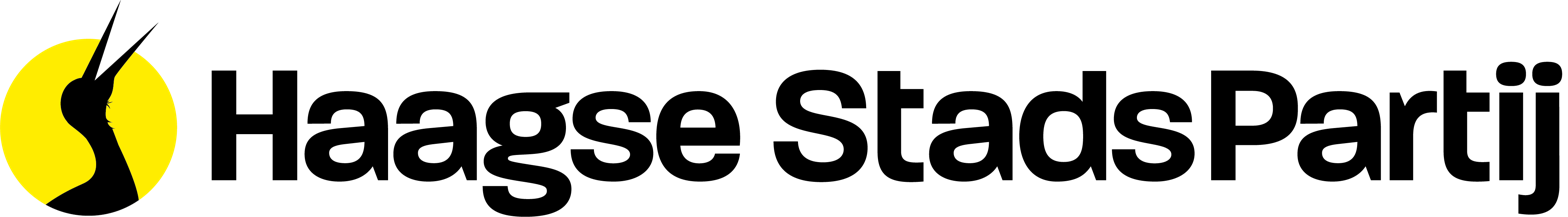
- Abbreviation: HSP
- Leader: Fatima Faïd
- Chairperson: Patricia Dinkela
- Founded: 5 November 1997; 28 years ago
- Headquarters: Spui 70, The Hague
- Ideology: Progressivism; Anarchism
- Political position: Left-wing
- Colours: Yellow
- The Hague municipal council: 0 / 45

Website
- haagsestadspartij.nl

The Haagse Stadspartij (Dutch: [ˈɦaːxsə ˈstɑtspɑrˌtɛi], lit. 'The Hague City Party'; abbreviated HSP) is a local political party in The Hague, Netherlands, founded in 1997. The party positions itself as a progressive and activist movement, advocating for citizen participation and promoting a vision of The Hague as a green, social and inclusive city.

== History ==
The party was established by activists involved in campaigns against the demolition of De Blauwe Aanslag and other controversial urban development projects in The Hague, including the construction of a tram tunnel, and the proposed Spuiforum theatre and its successor, Amare. From its inception, HSP has sought to act as a critical voice in local politics, presenting itself as a "gadfly" party with progressive ideas and a strong emphasis on grassroots engagement.

Logo between 2010 and 2021

In the municipal elections of 1998 and subsequent years, the party consistently won one seat. In 2004, HSP council member Joris Wijsmuller was named "best council member" by the Haagsche Courant. In the 2014 municipal council election, the HSP secured five seats. Wijsmuller subsequently joined the municipal executive on behalf of the HSP. After 24 years in local politics, Wijsmuller announced his departure in 2021, with Fatima Faïd succeeding him as lead candidate for the 2022 election.

Faïd has also been active in national politics: in the 2017 general election, she was the second candidate on the list of Bij1 (then known as Article 1), while continuing to serve as a council member for HSP. Ahead of the 2025 general election, HSP chair Patricia Dinkela stood as a candidate for Bij1's party leadership. On 6 August 2025, she lost the membership vote to Tofik Dibi.

== Electoral results ==
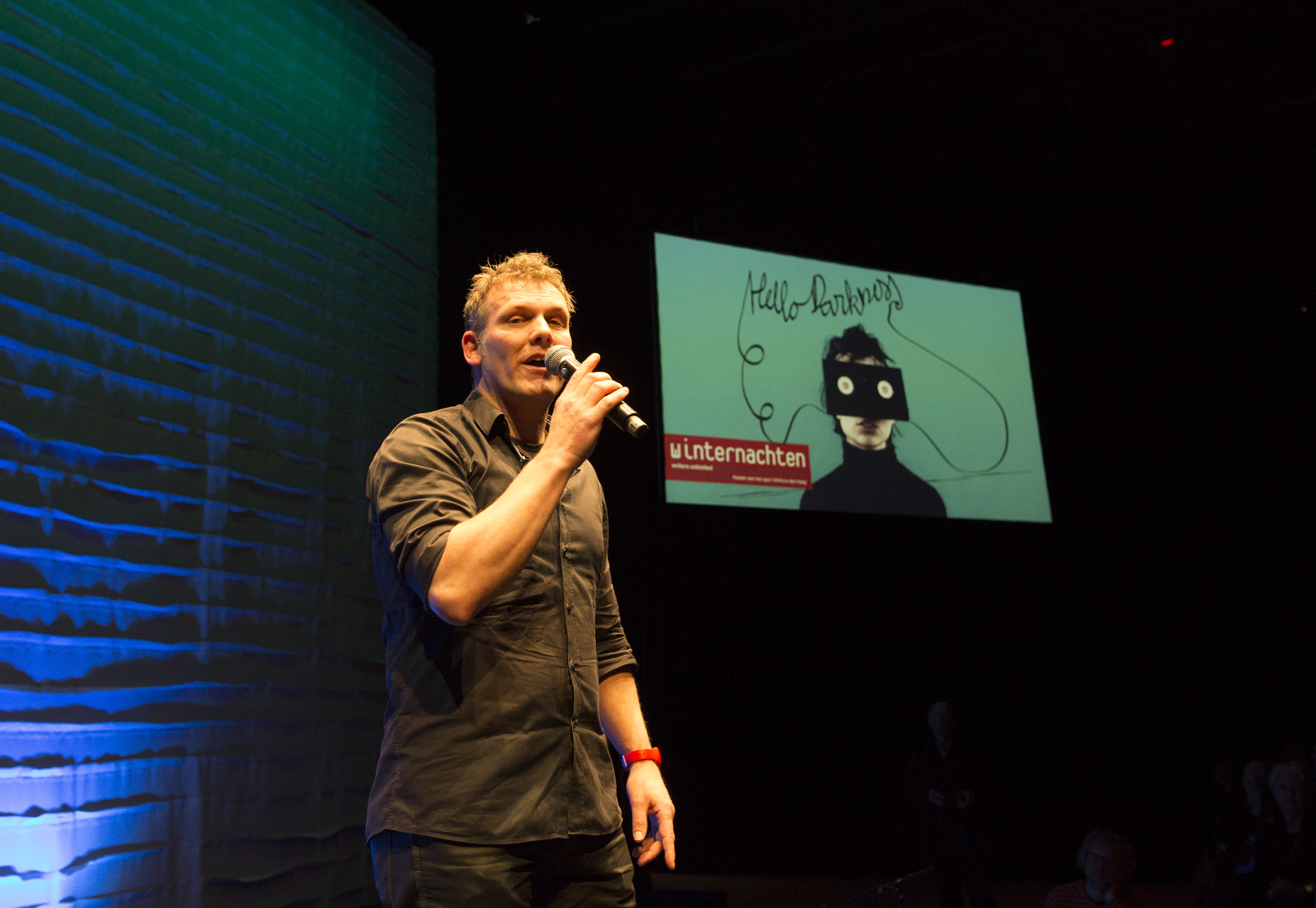
Party leader Joris Wijsmuller in 2016

=== Municipal council of The Hague ===
Election	Lead candidate	Votes	%	Seats	+/–
1998	Joris Wijsmuller			1 / 45	New
2002	Joris Wijsmuller			1 / 45	0
2006	Joris Wijsmuller	3,350	1.94	1 / 45	0
2010	Joris Wijsmuller	8,251	4.19	2 / 45	▲1
2014	Joris Wijsmuller	22,223	11.14	5 / 45	▲3
2018	Joris Wijsmuller	10,897	5.61	3 / 45	▼2
2022	Fatima Faïd	6,471	3.54	1 / 45	▼1
2026	Fatima Faïd	1,760	0.87	0 / 45	▼1
