= Code Orange (political party) =

Dutch political party

Code Orange Code Oranje
- Abbreviation: CO
- Leader: Richard de Mos
- Chairperson: Bert Blase
- Founder: Bert Blase
- Founded: 25 October 2018; 7 years ago
- Headquarters: Papendrecht, Stellingmolen 93352 BB
- Youth wing: Young Code Orange
- Ideology: Direct democracy Soft euroscepticism
- Political position: Syncretic
- Colours: Orange
- Senate: 0 / 75
- House of Representatives: 0 / 150
- European Parliament: 0 / 26

Website
- wijzijncodeoranje.nl

Code Orange (Dutch: Code Oranje [ˈkoːdə ʔoːˈrɑɲə]) was a political movement in the Netherlands.

== History ==
Code Orange was founded on 25 October 2018 by Bert Blase, the interim mayor of Heerhugowaard. The movement advocates for more influence for citizens in political decision-making - for instance, through binding referendums and citizens' assemblies.

In 2019, Code Orange participated in the provincial elections in four provinces, but did not win any seats. The movement also took part in the 2021 general election, but failed to win a seat. Richard de Mos was chosen as its lead candidate.

== Election results ==
=== House of Representatives ===
Election	Lead candidate	List	Votes	%	Seats	+/–	Government
2021	Richard de Mos	List	41,016	0.4	0 / 150	New	No seats

=== Provincial elections ===
Election	Province	Votes	%	Seats	+/−
2019	Gelderland	11,053	1.18	0 / 55	New
2019	North Brabant	2,784	0.27	0 / 55	New
2019	North Holland	16,665	1.43	0 / 55	New
2019	South Holland	4,598	0.32	0 / 55	New
