= Student en Stad =

Student and City Student en Stad
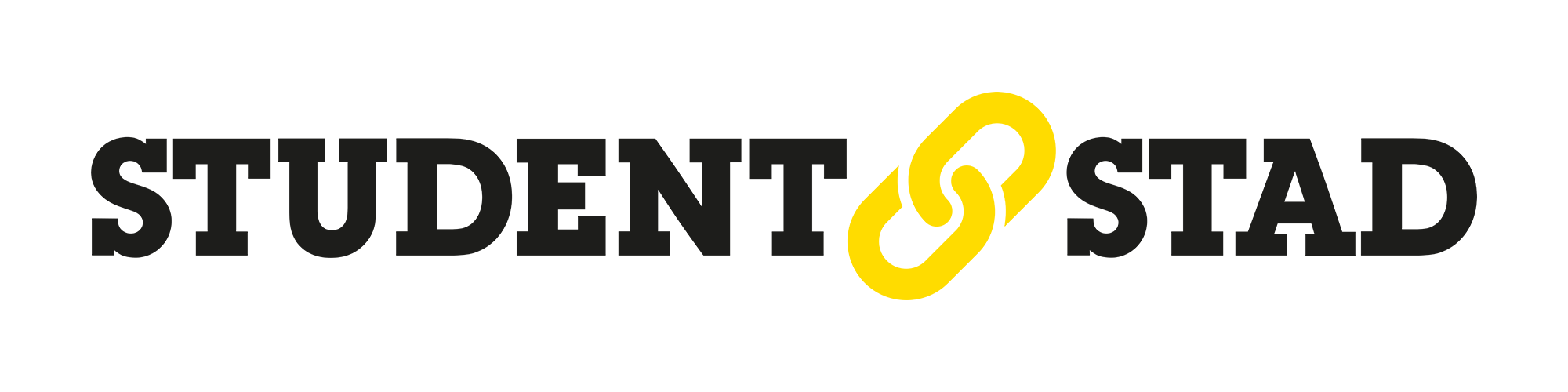
- Founded: November 1993
- Headquarters: Groningen
- Ideology: Localism; Student politics Syncretic politics
- Political position: Big tent
- Colours: Yellow, white, black
- Groningen Municipal Council: 3 / 45

Website
- studentenstad.nl

Student en Stad is a local political party in Groningen in the Netherlands. Founded in November 1993, it is one of just a few student political parties that have been able to win seats in Dutch local elections, with other similar and successful examples being Studenten Techniek In Politiek in Delft and Student & Starter in Utrecht. The party currently holds three seats on the Groningen municipal council.

Although the party's general focus is on student issues, they have not confined themselves to single issue student politics, but rather help decision-making on a range of local issues in Groningen.

== Election results ==
Election	Votes			Seats	
Election	#	%	±	#	±
1994	2,540	2.8%	New	1 / 39	New
1998	3,232	3.8%	▲1.0%	1 / 39	0
2002	4,195	5.0%	▲1.2%	2 / 39	▲1
2006	2,379	2.8%	▼2.2%	1 / 39	▼1
2010	3,566	4.2%	▲1.4%	1 / 39	0
2014	4,269	4.8%	▲0.6%	2 / 39	▲1
2018	2,807	3.1%	▼1.7%	1 / 45	▼1
2022	6,618	6.3%	▲3.2%	3 / 45	▲2

– Source:

== See also ==
- Connect Wageningen, a local party for students, young adults, and internationals in Wageningen
- Student & Starter, a local party for students, young people, and first-time homeowners in Utrecht
- Studenten Techniek In Politiek (STIP), a local students' party in Delft
