= 2018 Dutch municipal elections =

- 21 March 2018

Municipal elections were held on 21 March 2018 in 335 municipalities in the Netherlands. This election determined the composition of the municipal councils for the following four years. The election coincided with the Intelligence and Security Services Act referendum.

== Background ==
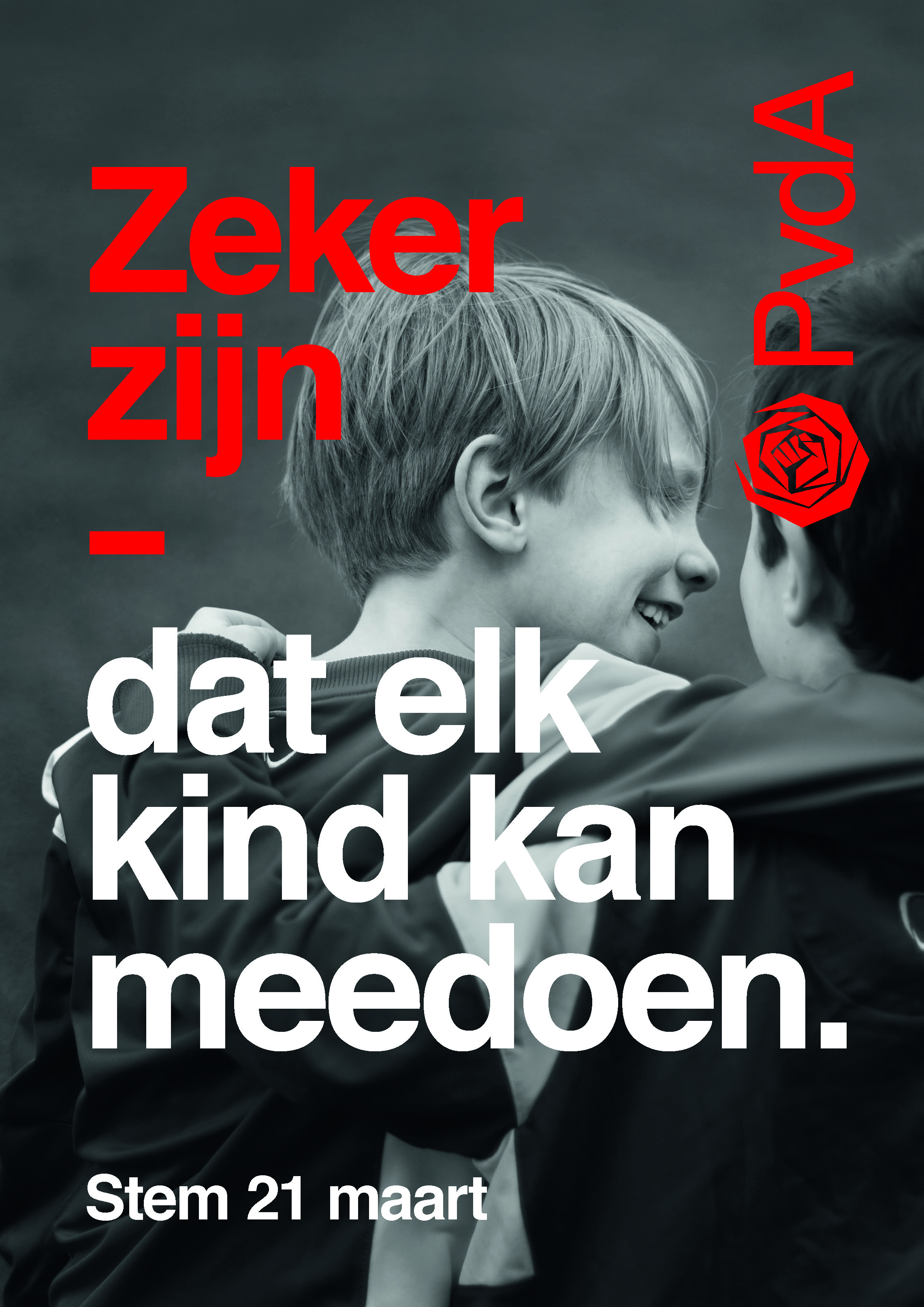
PvdA campaign poster

In the previous municipal elections, local political parties won by far most votes and seats. Nationally, all local political parties won 28% of the votes and a third of municipal council seats. Local parties have seen a steady rise since the 1990s. In 2018, Vlieland will be the only municipality in which no national political parties will contest the election.

Of all national political parties, the Christian Democratic Appeal (CDA) will contest most municipal elections; the party will be on the ballot in all but three (Rozendaal, Vlieland and Schiermonnikoog). The Labour Party (PvdA) comes second, contesting over 320 elections, albeit on a joint list with allied parties in some municipalities. The People's Party for Freedom and Democracy (VVD) will participate in over 315 elections, and the Democrats 66 in over 270, followed by GroenLinks in 220, the Christian Union in 169, the Socialist Party in 118 and the Reformed Political Party (SGP) in 99.

The Party for Freedom (PVV), which had previously only participated in The Hague and Almere, initially planned to expand to a total of sixty municipalities, but has only been able to find suitable candidates in thirty, including Rotterdam. 50PLUS will expand to twenty municipalities, while the Party for the Animals (PvdD) will contest fifteen elections. Two new national political parties will make their entrance to municipal politics. Denk will contest the elections in fourteen municipalities, while the Forum for Democracy will only contest in Amsterdam. Additionally, the latter has endorsed the local party Livable Rotterdam.

45 municipalities did not have elections on 21 March due to mergers.

== Electoral system ==
Municipal councils are elected using party-list proportional representation. The number of seats depends on the population of the municipality, ranging from nine seats for municipalities with a population below 3,000, to 45 seats for municipalities with a population over 200,000.

== Overall results ==
Party	Votes	%	Seats
Local Parties	1,945,904	28.65	2,612
People's Party for Freedom and Democracy	916,930	13.50	1,131
Christian Democratic Appeal	910,441	13.41	1,293
Democrats 66	623,671	9.18	602
GroenLinks	602,157	8.87	527
Labour Party	510,527	7.52	549
Socialist Party	301,600	4.44	285
Christian Union	260,007	3.83	303
Reformed Political Party	129,181	1.90	173
Party for Freedom	94,118	1.39	75
Christian Union – Reformed Political Party	87,762	1.29	107
Party for the Animals	80,904	1.19	30
DENK	70,832	1.04	24
GroenLinks–Labour Party	65,566	0.97	114
50PLUS	55,786	0.82	33
D66–GroenLinks–Labour Party	22,251	0.33	43
Forum for Democracy	20,015	0.29	3
NIDA	16,870	0.25	3
Frisian National Party	13,848	0.20	22
D66–GroenLinks	8,368	0.12	14
United Seniors Party	7,933	0.12	8
General Elderly Alliance	7,310	0.11	9
Elderly Politically Active	6,104	0.09	2
Trots op Nederland	6,066	0.09	3
Pirate Party	5,713	0.08	0
D66–Labour Party	4,596	0.07	5
D66–GL–PvdA–SP	4,528	0.07	10
D66–VVD	3,491	0.05	8
Jesus Lives	2,348	0.03	0
New Communist Party–NCPN	2,346	0.03	3
Ubuntu Connected Front	1,587	0.02	0
Libertarian Party	923	0.01	0
Basic Income Party	635	0.01	0
Peace and Justice	616	0.01	0
TROTS–OPA	510	0.01	0
QUEER	260	0.00	0
Total	6,791,704	100.00	7,991
Valid votes	6,791,704	99.15	
Invalid/blank votes	58,084	0.85	
Total votes	6,849,788	100.00	
Registered voters/turnout	12,461,540	54.97	
Source: Kiesraad

== Amsterdam ==
=== Opinion polling ===
Polling firm	Date	D66	PvdA	VVD	SP	GL	PvdD	CDA	PvdO	CU	DENK	FvD	Bij1	50+	Lead	Ref.
OIS	17 Mar 2018	8	5	6	4	9	3	1	0/1	0	3	4	1	0/1	1	
Peil.nl	10 Mar 2018	9	5	4	5	9	2	1	0	1	3	4	1	1	Tied	
OIS	17 Jan 2018	10	8	5	4	8	2	1	0/1	0	2	3	1	0/1	2	
Peil.nl	10 Jan 2018	9	5	6	4	9	2	1	0	0	3	3	2	1	Tied	
2014 election	19 Mar 2014	14	10	6	6	6	1	1	1	0	did not contest				4	

=== Results ===
Party	Votes	%	Seats	+/–
GroenLinks	70,880	20.42	10	+4
Democrats 66	55,724	16.05	8	–6
People's Party for Freedom and Democracy	39,702	11.44	6	0
Labour Party	37,181	10.71	5	–5
Socialist Party	26,070	7.51	3	–3
Party for the Animals	24,672	7.11	3	+2
DENK	23,138	6.67	3	New
Forum for Democracy	20,015	5.77	3	New
Christian Democratic Appeal	11,991	3.45	1	0
Party for the Elderly	7,752	2.23	1	0
Christian Union	6,837	1.97	1	+1
Amsterdam BIJ1	6,571	1.89	1	New
Other parties	16,615	4.79	0	0
Total	347,148	100.00	45	–
Valid votes	347,148	98.72		
Invalid/blank votes	4,511	1.28		
Total votes	351,659	100.00		
Registered voters/turnout	674,286	52.15		
Source: Kiesraad

After the 2018 municipal elections, the GroenLinks held the largest share of seats on the municipal council, though not enough to hold a majority. As no party held a majority, a left-leaning governing coalition was formed between GroenLinks, D66, the Labour Party, and the Socialist Party, which together hold 26 of the city's 45 council seats.

The new city council elected Femke Halsema, a member of the GroenLinks, to be the mayor of Amsterdam. Halsema is the first woman to be elected mayor of Amsterdam, as well as the first member of the GroenLinks to take that position.

== Rotterdam ==
=== Opinion polling ===
Polling firm	Date	LR	PvdA	D66	SP	VVD	CDA	GL	NIDA	CU-SGP	PvdD	PVV	DENK	50+	Lead	Ref
Peil.nl	18 Feb 2018	9	5	5	5	4	3	5	1	1	1	3	2	1	4	
Peil.nl	25 Jan 2018	7	5	5	4	6	3	5	1	1	1	5	2	0	1	
2014 election	19 Mar 2014	14	8	6	5	3	3	2	2	1	1	did not contest			6	

=== Results ===
Party	Votes	%	Seats	+/–
Livable Rotterdam	47,312	20.50	11	–3
People's Party for Freedom and Democracy	24,641	10.68	5	+2
Democrats 66	22,920	9.93	5	–1
GroenLinks	22,721	9.85	5	+3
Labour Party	22,275	9.65	5	–3
DENK	16,955	7.35	4	New
NIDA Rotterdam	12,389	5.37	2	0
Socialist Party	11,389	4.93	2	–3
Christian Democratic Appeal	10,756	4.66	2	–1
Party for Freedom	8,149	3.53	1	New
Party for the Animals	8,091	3.51	1	0
50PLUS	7,359	3.19	1	New
Christian Union – Reformed Political Party	6,956	3.01	1	0
Other parties	8,873	3.84	0	0
Total	230,786	100.00	45	–
Valid votes	230,786	98.61		
Invalid/blank votes	3,251	1.39		
Total votes	234,037	100.00		
Registered voters/turnout	501,234	46.69		
Source: Kiesraad

== The Hague ==
=== Opinion polling ===
Polling firm	Date	D66	PVV	PvdA	HSP	VVD	CDA	GDM	SP	GL	ID	PvdE	CU–SGP	PvdD	50+	Lead	Ref
I&O Research	14 Mar 2018	7	4	3	3	5	2	6	1	6	2	0	2	2	2	1	
I&O Research	21 Feb 2018	6	4	4	2	7	3	6	2	5	1	0	1	2	2	1	
I&O Research	31 Jan 2018	8	4	4	2	6	2	5	1	5	1	0	3	2	2	2	
2014 election	19 Mar 2014	8	7	6	5	4	3	3	2	2	2	1	1	1	did not contest	1	

=== Results ===
Party	Votes	%	Seats	+/–
De Mos Group/Hart voor Den Haag	32,632	16.80	8	+5
People's Party for Freedom and Democracy	26,990	13.90	7	+3
Democrats 66	23,973	12.34	6	–2
GroenLinks	20,684	10.65	5	+3
Christian Democratic Appeal	12,618	6.50	3	0
Labour Party	12,567	6.47	3	–3
Haagse Stadspartij	10,897	5.61	3	–2
Party for the Animals	10,201	5.25	2	+1
Party for Freedom	9,036	4.65	2	–5
Islam Democrats	6,943	3.57	1	–1
Christian Union – Reformed Political Party	6,129	3.16	1	0
Socialist Party	5,176	2.66	1	–1
Nida	4,481	2.31	1	New
50Plus	4,444	2.29	1	New
Party of Unity	4,026	2.07	1	0
Other parties	3,439	1.77	0	0
Total	194,236	100.00	45	–
Valid votes	194,236	98.85		
Invalid/blank votes	2,261	1.15		
Total votes	196,497	100.00		
Registered voters/turnout	409,444	47.99		
Source: Kiesraad

== Utrecht ==
=== Opinion polling ===
Polling firm	Date	D66	GL	VVD	PvdA	SP	CDA	SBU	CU	S&S	PvdD	DENK	PVV	Lead	Ref
Peil.nl	24 Jan 2018	9	10	7	4	3	3	1	2	1	1	2	2	1	
2014 election	19 Mar 2014	13	9	5	5	4	3	2	2	1	1	did not contest		4	

=== Results ===
Party	Votes	%	Seats	+/–
GroenLinks	36,231	22.96	12	+3
Democrats 66	32,735	20.74	10	–3
People's Party for Freedom and Democracy	20,522	13.00	6	+1
Labour Party	9,812	6.22	3	–2
Christian Democratic Appeal	8,428	5.34	2	–1
Party for the Animals	8,317	5.27	2	+1
DENK	7,662	4.85	2	New
Christian Union	6,451	4.09	2	0
Student & Starter	6,445	4.08	2	+1
Socialist Party	6,419	4.07	2	–2
Party for Freedom	5,915	3.75	1	New
City Interest Utrecht	4,295	2.72	1	–1
Other parties	4,590	2.91	0	0
Total	157,822	100.00	45	–
Valid votes	157,822	99.23		
Invalid/blank votes	1,224	0.77		
Total votes	159,046	100.00		
Registered voters/turnout	269,459	59.02		
Source: Kiesraad

== Eindhoven ==
=== Results ===
Party	Votes	%	Seats	+/–
People's Party for Freedom and Democracy	12,275	14.79	7	+1
GroenLinks	12,044	14.51	7	+3
Labour Party	10,180	12.27	6	–2
Democrats 66	9,735	11.73	6	–1
Christian Democratic Appeal	9,514	11.46	6	+2
Socialist Party	6,609	7.96	4	–3
Elderly Appeal Eindhoven	4,647	5.60	2	–3
Pim Fortuyn List Eindhoven	3,353	4.04	2	+1
50PLUS	3,249	3.91	2	New
DENK	2,864	3.45	1	New
Livable Eindhoven	2,294	2.76	1	–1
Christian Union	1,955	2.36	1	0
Other parties	4,275	5.15	0	0
Total	82,994	100.00	45	–
Valid votes	82,994	98.82		
Invalid/blank votes	988	1.18		
Total votes	83,982	100.00		
Registered voters/turnout	181,079	46.38		
Source: Kiesraad

== Nijmegen ==
=== Opinion polling ===
Polling firm	Date	SP	GL	D66	PvdA	VVD	GN	CDA	DNF	50+	PvdD	Lead	Ref
Peil.nl	24 Jan 2018	6	9	7	3	4	2	2	2	2	2	2	
2014 election	19 Mar 2014	8	8	7	4	4	2	2	2	2 (Note: Contested as the United Seniors Party.)	did not contest	Tied	

=== Results ===
Party	Votes	%	Seats	+/–
GroenLinks	20,149	24.77	11	+3
Democrats 66	12,045	14.81	6	–1
Socialist Party	10,865	13.36	5	–3
People's Party for Freedom and Democracy	8,407	10.34	4	0
City Party Nijmegen	6,355	7.81	3	+1
Labour Party	5,747	7.07	3	–1
Christian Democratic Appeal	4,094	5.03	2	0
Party for the Animals	3,694	4.54	2	New
50PLUS	3,001	3.69	1	New
Just Nijmegen	2,815	3.46	1	–1
ForNijmegen.NOW	1,845	2.27	1	New
Other parties	2,323	2.86	0	–2
Total	81,340	100.00	39	–
Valid votes	81,340	99.27		
Invalid/blank votes	598	0.73		
Total votes	81,938	100.00		
Registered voters/turnout	143,582	57.07		
Source: Kiesraad
