= AT5 =

Local television station in Amsterdam

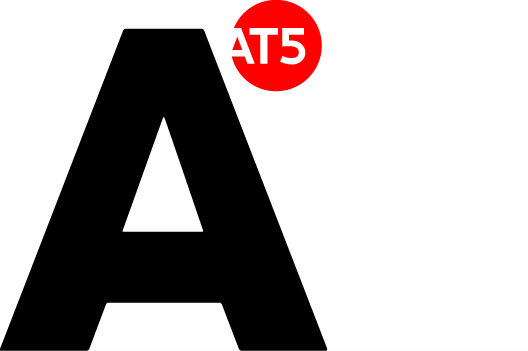
- Type: Public broadcaster
- Country: Netherlands
- Broadcast area: Amsterdam
- Headquarters: Amsterdam

History
- Launched: April 1, 1992

Links
- Website: www.at5.nl

Availability

Streaming media
- Ziggo GO: Watch live (Netherlands only)
- AT5 Livestream: Watch Live

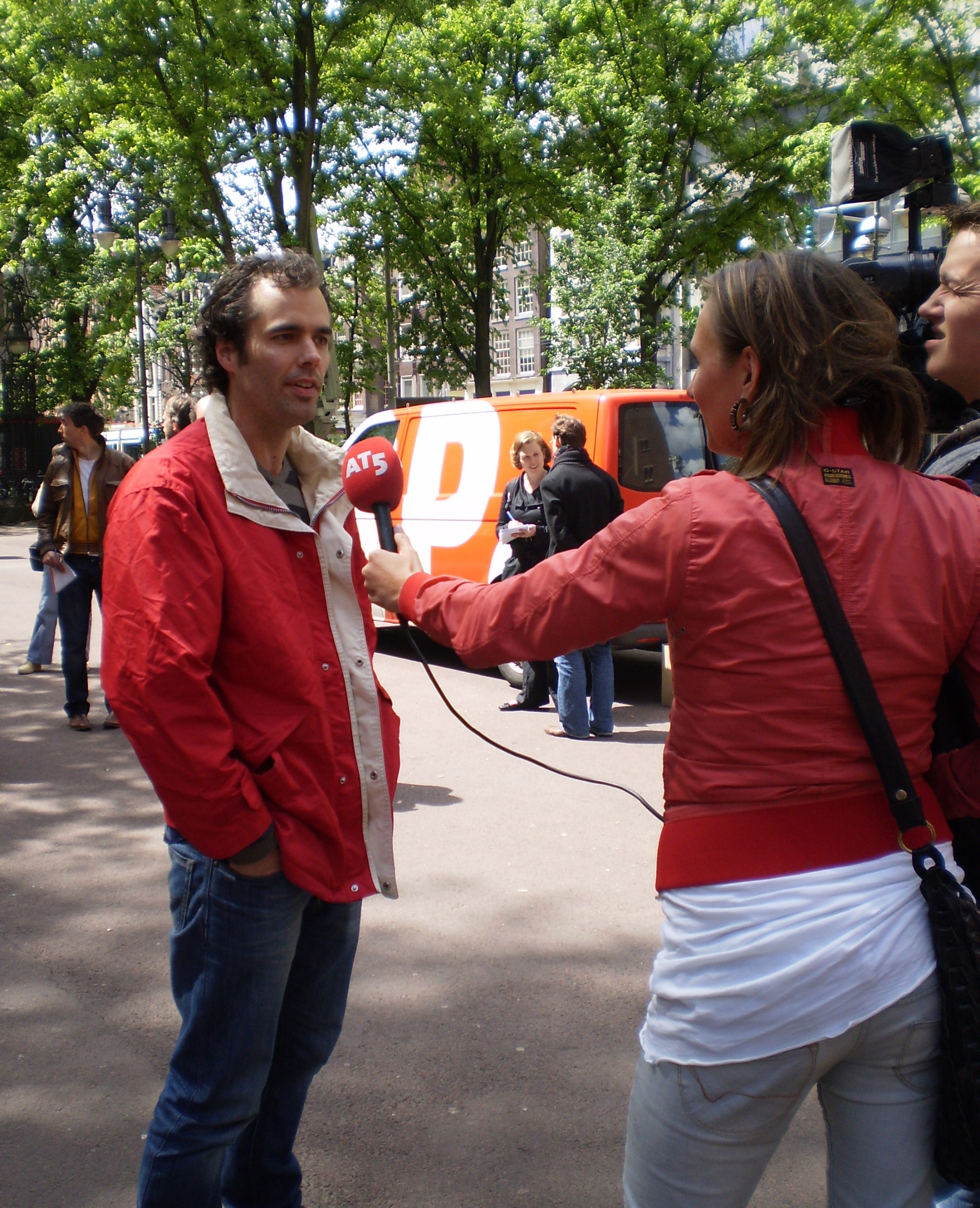
A reporter from Amsterdam television station AT5 interviews city council party leader (Fractievoorzitter) Laurens Ivens.

AT5 (Amstel Television 5) is a local television station in Amsterdam, Netherlands. It first broadcast on April 1, 1992.

The city of Amsterdam is a minority shareholder, and has provided financial support to the station.

== See also ==
- Media of the Netherlands
- Netherlands Public Broadcasting
