= 2022 Dutch municipal elections =

- 16 March 2022

Municipal elections were held on 16 March 2022 in 333 municipalities in the Netherlands. This election determined the composition of the municipal councils for the following four years.

== Background ==
In the previous municipal elections, local political parties won by far the most votes and seats. Nationally, all local political parties won a total of 29% of the votes and around a third of municipal council seats. Local parties have seen a steady rise since the 1990s and in Vlieland there are only local parties that participate.

Of all national political parties, the Christian Democratic Appeal (CDA) will contest the most municipal elections; the party will be on the ballot in all but five (Diemen, Ouder-Amstel, Rozendaal, Vlieland and Schiermonnikoog). The People's Party for Freedom and Democracy (VVD) comes in second, contesting in 317 elections, while Democrats 66 participates in 289 elections. The Labour Party (PvdA) will participate in 303 elections, and GroenLinks in 229, many of which are joint lists between the two parties. Meanwhile, the ChristianUnion runs in 175 and the Reformed Political Party (SGP) in 96, with these parties also having many joint lists. The Socialist Party participates in 86, Forum for Democracy (FvD), which had previously only participated in Amsterdam, has expanded significantly to participate in 50 elections. The Party for Freedom (PVV) participates in 31, Party for the Animals (PvdD) in 30, DENK in 20, 50PLUS in 19 and BIJ1 in 5. There are also 3 national parties participating for the first time in municipal elections, BvNL in 20 municipalities, Volt in 10, and JA21 only in Amsterdam.

Twelve municipalities did not have elections on 16 March due to mergers.

== Electoral system ==
Municipal councils are elected using party-list proportional representation. The number of seats depends on the population of the municipality, ranging from nine seats for municipalities with a population below 3,000, to 45 seats for municipalities with a population over 200,000. All people above the age of 18, who are registered in a municipality, and have not been excluded from voting following a court's decision are eligible to vote. Dutch citizenship is not required to be eligible to vote for municipal elections, non-EU nationals who have legally resided in the Netherlands for at least five years and EU citizens are also eligible to vote.

== National ==
=== Opinion polling ===
Polling firm	Release date	Sample size	Local	VVD	CDA	D66	GL	PvdA	SP	CU	SGP	PVV	PvdD	DENK	50+	FvD	BIJ1	Volt	JA21	Others	Lead	Ref.
I&O Research	10 Mar 2022	1,495	35.4%	11.2%	6.8%	7.5%	7.8%	7.4%	3.6%	3.8%	2.9%	3.3%	3.6%	0.9%	1.1%	1.3%	0.5%	1.5%	0.6%	0.4%	24.2%	
I&O Research	18 Feb 2022	1,444	33.0%	12.7%	6.0%	7.6%	7.3%	6.4%	3.6%	3.9%	2.9%	4.5%	3.6%	1.1%	0.7%	1.4%	0.9%	1.9%	2.6%	0.0%	20.3%	
I&O Research	31 Jan 2022	1,444	31.8%	12.3%	5.2%	7.2%	7.3%	6.0%	3.0%	3.3%	3.0%	6.3%	4.0%	1.3%	1.1%	2.5%	0.9%	2.6%	2.2%	0.0%	19.5%	
2018 election	21 Mar 2018	–	28.7%	13.5%	13.4%	9.2%	8.9%	7.5%	4.4%	3.8%	1.9%	1.4%	1.2%	1.0%	0.8%	0.3%	0.1%	did not contest		4.6%	15.2%	

=== Results ===
Party	Votes	%	Seats	+/–
Local parties	2,134,965	30.95	2,988	+377
People's Party for Freedom and Democracy	807,085	11.70	1,000	–131
Christian Democratic Appeal	773,399	11.21	1,105	–240
Democrats 66	607,353	8.81	620	+18
GroenLinks	585,673	8.49	546	+19
Labour Party	541,140	7.85	560	+11
Christian Union	268,794	3.90	305	+2
Socialist Party	192,132	2.79	173	–112
Reformed Political Party	158,781	2.30	229	+56
Party for the Animals	135,587	1.97	63	+33
GroenLinks–PvdA	99,472	1.44	164	+50
Forum for Democracy	76,750	1.11	50	+47
CU-SGP	74,188	1.08	101	–6
Denk	67,982	0.99	24	0
Party for Freedom	62,559	0.91	61	–14
Volt	51,823	0.75	20	New
Farmer–Citizen Movement	43,892	0.64	59	New
50PLUS	43,517	0.63	24	–9
BIJ1	40,332	0.58	8	+7
Frisian National Party	36,200	0.52	49	+27
BVNL	21,447	0.31	17	New
JA21	13,691	0.20	2	New
D66–GL–PvdA	12,515	0.18	26	–17
Party for the Elderly and Safety	10,104	0.15	11	New
D66–GL	6,936	0.10	12	–2
Party for the North	5,829	0.08	5	New
D66–PvdA	4,043	0.06	4	–1
Jesus Lives	3,893	0.06	0	0
Pirate Party	3,251	0.05	1	+1
General Elderly Alliance	3,217	0.05	4	-5
LEF - For the New Generation	2,466	0.04	0	New
Heart for Freedom	2,334	0.03	1	New
BBB–TROTS	2,152	0.03	1	New
Trots op Nederland	1,422	0.02	2	-1
D66–GL–PvdA–SP	1,240	0.02	2	–8
The Party Party	912	0.01	0	New
Total	6,897,076	100.00	8,237	–
Valid votes	6,897,076	99.47		
Invalid/blank votes	37,085	0.53		
Total votes	6,934,161	100.00		
Registered voters/turnout	13,599,700	50.99		
Source: Kiesraad

== Amsterdam ==
=== Opinion polling ===
Polling firm	Date	GL	D66	VVD	PvdA	SP	PvdD	DENK	FvD	CDA	PvdO (Note: Party for the Elderly)	CU	BIJ1	JA21	Volt	Lead	Ref.
OIS	13 Mar 2022	7	7	4	7	2	4	2	1	1	0	1	2	4	3	Tied	
I&O Research	5 Mar 2022	8	8	4	6	3	4	2	1	0	1	0	3	2	3	Tied	
Peil.nl	22 Feb 2022	5/6	8	6	5/6	2	4	3	1	1	1	1	3	1	3	2	
OIS	5 Feb 2022	7	6	4	5	2	4	2	1	1	1	1	2	4	6	1	
I&O Research	31 Jan 2022	8	8	5	5	2	4	2	2	0	0	0	3	2	4	Tied	
Peil.nl	18 Jan 2022	5	8	5	5	2	4	3	1	1	1	1	3	1	5	3	
2018 election	21 Mar 2018	10	8	6	5	3	3	3	3	1	1	1	1	did not contest		2	

=== Results ===
Party	Votes	%	Seats	+/–
Labour Party	57,093	17.57	9	+4
GroenLinks	48,096	14.80	8	–2
Democrats 66	44,732	13.77	7	–1
People's Party for Freedom and Democracy	34,180	10.52	5	–1
Amsterdam BIJ1	22,623	6.96	3	+2
Party for the Animals	22,031	6.78	3	0
Volt	14,043	4.32	2	New
Socialist Party	14,036	4.32	2	–1
JA21	13,691	4.21	2	New
DENK	13,039	4.01	2	–1
Christian Democratic Appeal	8,270	2.55	1	0
Forum for Democracy	6,688	2.06	1	–2
Other parties	26,347	8.11	0	–2
Total	324,869	100.00	45	–
Valid votes	324,869	99.11		
Invalid/blank votes	2,924	0.89		
Total votes	327,793	100.00		
Registered voters/turnout	703,714	46.58		
Source: Kiesraad

== Rotterdam ==
=== Opinion polling ===
Polling firm	Date	LR	VVD	D66	GL	PvdA	DENK	SP	CDA	PvdD	50+	CU	BIJ1	FvD	Volt	S010	Lead	Ref.
Peil.nl	6 Mar 2022	13	5	6	4	3	4	1	1	2	0	1	2	1	2	0	7	
Peil.nl	22 Feb 2022	13	5	6	3	3	3	1	1	2	0	1	2	1	3	1	7	
2018 election	21 Mar 2018	11	5	5	5	5	4	2	2	1	1	1 (Note: contested as CU-SGP)	did not contest				6	

=== Results ===
Party	Votes	%	Seats	+/–
Livable Rotterdam	39,972	20.08	10	-1
People's Party for Freedom and Democracy	22,410	11.26	6	+1
GroenLinks	19,806	9.95	5	0
Democrats 66	19,761	9.93	5	0
Labour Party	17,113	8.60	4	–1
DENK	15,612	7.84	4	0
Volt	10,365	5.21	2	New
Party for the Animals	8,552	4.30	2	+1
BIJ1	8,205	4.12	2	New
50PLUS	7,216	3.63	1	0
Christian Union	6,822	3.43	1	New
Socialist Party	5,766	2.90	1	–1
Christian Democratic Appeal	5,749	2.89	1	–1
Forum for Democracy	4,637	2.33	1	New
Other parties	7,053	3.54	0	–4
Total	199,039	100.00	45	–
Valid votes	199,039	98.93		
Invalid/blank votes	2,161	1.07		
Total votes	201,200	100.00		
Registered voters/turnout	516,986	38.92		
Source: Kiesraad

== The Hague ==
=== Opinion polling ===
Polling firm	Date	HvDH	VVD	D66	GL	CDA	PvdA	HSP	PvdD	PVV	CU–SGP	SP	50+	FvD	Denk	Lead	Ref.
I&O Research	8 Mar 2022	9	5	7	5	2	4	2	4	3	1	1	0	0	2	2	
I&O Research	8 Feb 2022	9	6	6	5	1	5	2	3	2	1	2	0	0	3	3	
Peil.nl	18 Jan 2022	11	7	7	4	2	3	1	3	2	1	1	0	1	2	4	
2018 election	21 Mar 2018	8	7	6	5	3	3	3	2	2	1	1	1	did not contest		1	

=== Results ===
Party	Votes	%	Seats	+/–
Hart voor Den Haag	30,988	16.97	9	+1
Democrats 66	27,937	15.30	8	+2
People's Party for Freedom and Democracy	24,298	13.30	7	0
GroenLinks	18,223	9.98	5	0
Party for the Animals	12,363	6.77	3	+1
Labour Party	11,764	6.44	3	0
Christian Democratic Appeal	11,455	6.27	3	0
Denk	10,222	5.60	2	New
Haagse Stadspartij	6,471	3.54	1	–2
Socialist Party	5,337	2.92	1	0
Party for Freedom	5,324	2.92	1	–1
Christian Union – Reformed Political Party	4,971	2.72	1	0
Forum for Democracy	3,896	2.13	1	New
Other parties	9,380	5.14	0	–4
Total	182,629	100.00	45	–
Valid votes	182,629	99.20		
Invalid/blank votes	1,465	0.80		
Total votes	184,094	100.00		
Registered voters/turnout	428,137	43.00		
Source: Kiesraad

== Utrecht ==
=== Opinion polling ===
Polling firm	Date	GL	D66	VVD	PvdA	CDA	PvdD	DENK	CU	S&S	SP	PVV	SBU (Note: City Interest Utrecht)	BIJ1	Volt	FvD	Lead	Ref.
I&O Research	5 Mar 2022	9	8	6	3	1	4	3	1	0	1	2	1	2	4	0	1	
Peil.nl	24 Feb 2022	7	8	6	3	1	3	3	2	2	0/1	2	2	0/1	4	1	1	
2018 election	21 Mar 2018	12	10	6	3	2	2	2	2	2	2	1	1	did not contest			2	

=== Results ===
Party	Votes	%	Seats	+/–
GroenLinks	29,110	18.49	9	–3
Democrats 66	25,628	16.28	8	–2
People's Party for Freedom and Democracy	14,856	9.44	5	–1
Labour Party	12,460	7.91	4	+1
Christian Democratic Appeal	11,117	7.06	3	+1
Party for the Animals	10,124	6.43	3	+1
Volt	8,896	5.65	3	New
Student & Starter	8,546	5.43	2	0
Christian Union	6,034	3.83	2	0
DENK	5,525	3.51	1	–1
BIJ1	5,398	3.43	1	New
OneUtrecht	4,383	2.78	1	New
Socialist Party	3,945	2.51	1	–1
City Interest Utrecht	3,432	2.18	1	0
Party for Freedom	3,385	2.15	1	0
Other parties	4,586	2.91	0	0
Total	157,425	100.00	45	–
Valid votes	157,425	99.59		
Invalid/blank votes	645	0.41		
Total votes	158,070	100.00		
Registered voters/turnout	280,577	56.34		
Source: Kiesraad

== Groningen ==
=== Opinion polling ===
Polling firm	Date	GL	PvdA	D66	SP	VVD	CU	PvdD	CDA	SP100G (Note: City Party 100% For Groningen)	S&S	PVV	PvhN	Lead	Ref.
I&O Research	5 Mar 2022	8	5	9	3	5	3	4	1	4	0	2	1	1	
2018 reorganisation election	21 Nov 2018	11	6	5	5	4	3	3	2	4 (Note: contested as 100G, SSO and Sport Party)	1	1	did not contest	5	

=== Results ===
Party	Votes	%	Seats	+/–
GroenLinks	18,669	17.76	9	–2
Labour Party	12,434	11.83	6	0
Democrats 66	10,986	10.45	5	0
Party for the Animals	9,730	9.26	4	+1
City Party 100% for Groningen	9,689	9.22	4	0
Socialist Party	8,631	8.21	4	–1
People's Party for Freedom and Democracy	7,860	7.48	3	–1
Student en Stad	6,607	6.29	3	+2
Christian Union	5,344	5.08	2	–1
Christian Democratic Appeal	5,243	4.99	2	0
Party for the North	4,282	4.07	2	New
Party for Freedom	2,234	2.13	1	0
Other parties	3,401	3.24	0	0
Total	105,110	100.00	45	–
Valid votes	105,110	99.59		
Invalid/blank votes	437	0.41		
Total votes	105,547	100.00		
Registered voters/turnout	194,113	54.37		
Source: Kiesraad

== Nijmegen ==
=== Results ===
Party	Votes	%	Seats	+/–
GroenLinks	16,149	20.36	9	–2
City Party Nijmegen	12,873	16.23	7	+4
Democrats 66	10,664	13.45	6	0
Labour Party	8,352	10.53	4	+1
Party for the Animals	7,726	9.74	4	+2
Socialist Party	7,043	8.88	3	–2
People's Party for Freedom and Democracy	6,184	7.80	3	–1
Christian Democratic Appeal	3,562	4.49	2	0
Just Nijmegen.NOW	2,713	3.42	1	–1
Other parties	4,036	5.09	0	–1
Total	79,302	100.00	39	–
Valid votes	79,302	99.53		
Invalid/blank votes	377	0.47		
Total votes	79,679	100.00		
Registered voters/turnout	147,174	54.14		
Source: Kiesraad

== Eindhoven ==
=== Results ===
Party	Votes	%	Seats	+/–
GroenLinks	14,367	18.51	9	+2
CDA	9,232	11.89	6	0
VVD	8,951	11.53	6	-1
Labour Party	8,390	10.81	5	-1
Democrats 66	7,520	9.69	5	-1
Socialist Party	4,584	5.90	3	-1
Volt	4,348	5.60	3	New
Ouderen Appèl – Hart voor Eindhoven	4,325	5.57	3	+1
Party for the Animals	3,633	4.68	2	New
Lijst Pim Fortuyn Eindhoven	2,631	3.39	1	-1
Forum for Democracy	2,324	2.99	1	New
50PLUS	1,774	2.29	1	-1
DENK	1,432	1.84	0	-1
Christian Union	1,408	1.81	0	-1
Other parties	2,715	3.50	0	–
Total	77,634	100.00	45	–
Valid votes	77,634	99.47		
Invalid/blank votes	411	0.53		
Total votes	78,045	100.00		
Registered voters/turnout	186,938	41.75		
Source: Kiesraad
