= Municipal council (Netherlands) =

Elected assembly of a municipality in the Netherlands

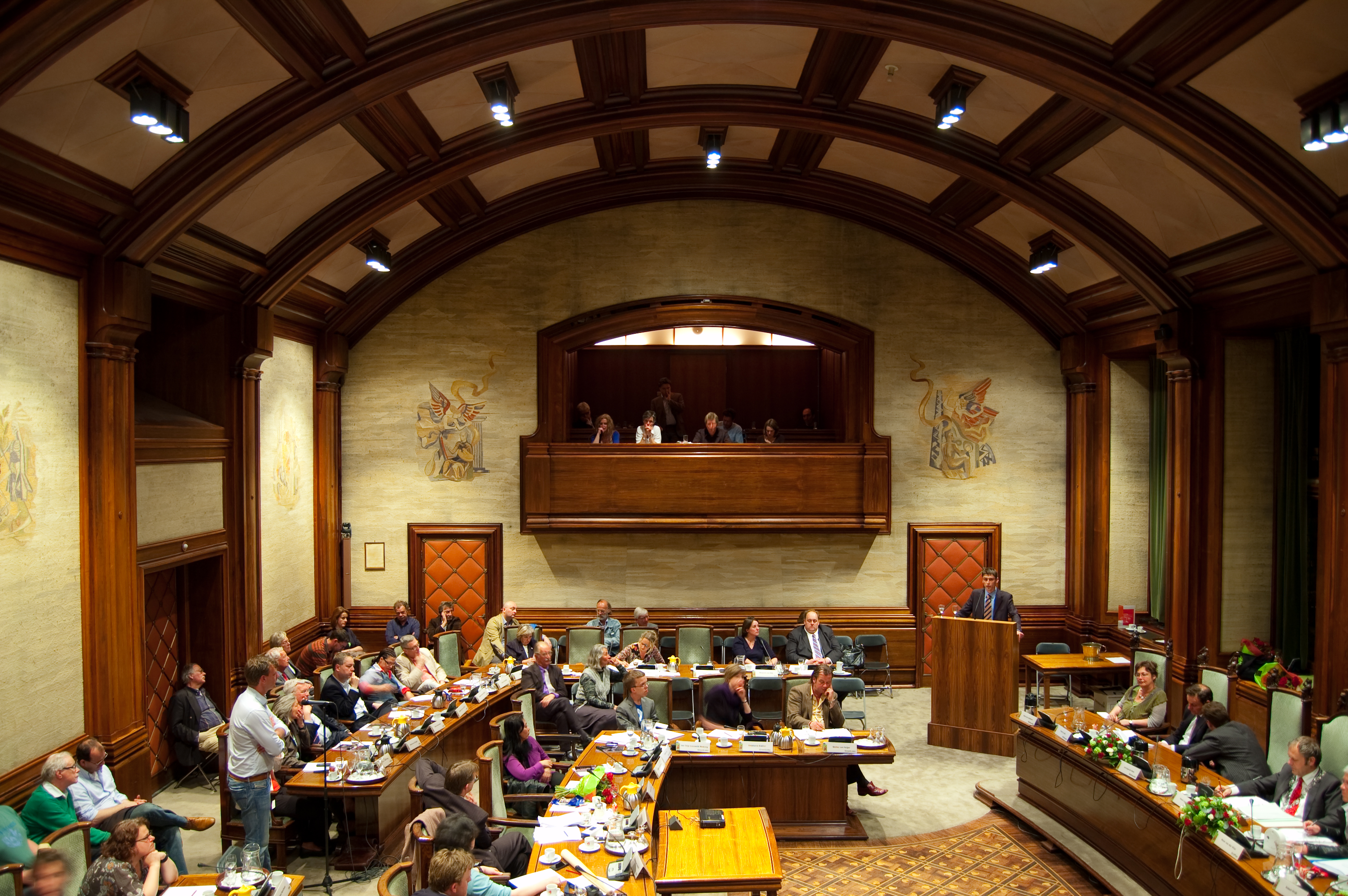
The municipal council of Leiden

In the Netherlands, the municipal council (Dutch: gemeenteraad [ɣəˈmeːn.təˌraːt]) is the elected assembly of a municipality. Its main role is laying down the guidelines for the policy of the municipal executive and exercising control over its execution by the mayor and aldermen.

The municipal councils range in size from nine to 45 seats (as in Amsterdam, the capital city), depending on the municipality's population, and are elected by the population every four years. In many municipalities all major political parties contest in the election in addition to local parties. In most major, urban municipalities, all major parties are represented in the municipal council, while in smaller and more rural municipalities, only the largest parties and a local party have seats in the municipal council.

== Suffrage ==
All Dutch citizens, and all foreigners who have lived in the Netherlands for at least four years in a municipality, have the right to vote and almost all citizens can stand for election.

== Municipal clerk ==
The municipal council is supported by its own civil service headed by the council's municipal clerk (raadsgriffier).

== General council members ==
Members of the council are not paid as full-time politicians; instead, most of them have day job. As in most legislatures, the members of municipal council work in both political groups and policy area related committees.

== Mayor ==
The mayor chairs the meetings of the council but does not have voting rights.

== Unelected committee members ==
Most municipal councils have added the possibility to have unelected committee members, known as a burgercommissielid ("civilian committee members", plural burgercommissieleden), shortened burgerlid ("civilian member"). Other terms such as duoraadslid ("duo councillor", plural duoraadsleden) or fractievolger exist. Research in 2020 counted at least 39 terms.

The burgercommissielid is a representative of a political party who is not elected into a municipal council. A burgercommissielid has the right to speak in the meetings of committees of the municipal council which serve as the preparatory part of council meetings. This allows small groups in a municipal council to spread the duties of membership of the municipal council among more people. In most municipalities it is a requirement that the burgercommissielid was on the electoral list for the election. The addition of burgercommissielid helps to reduce the workload of elected counsel members. Research at Erasmus University indicated that the addition of burgercommissieleden also increases participation of young politicians in municipal politics.
