= Dutch farmers' protests =

2019–present protest of farmers in the Netherlands

- Part of the nitrogen crisis in the Netherlands and the 2023–2024 European Union farmers' protests
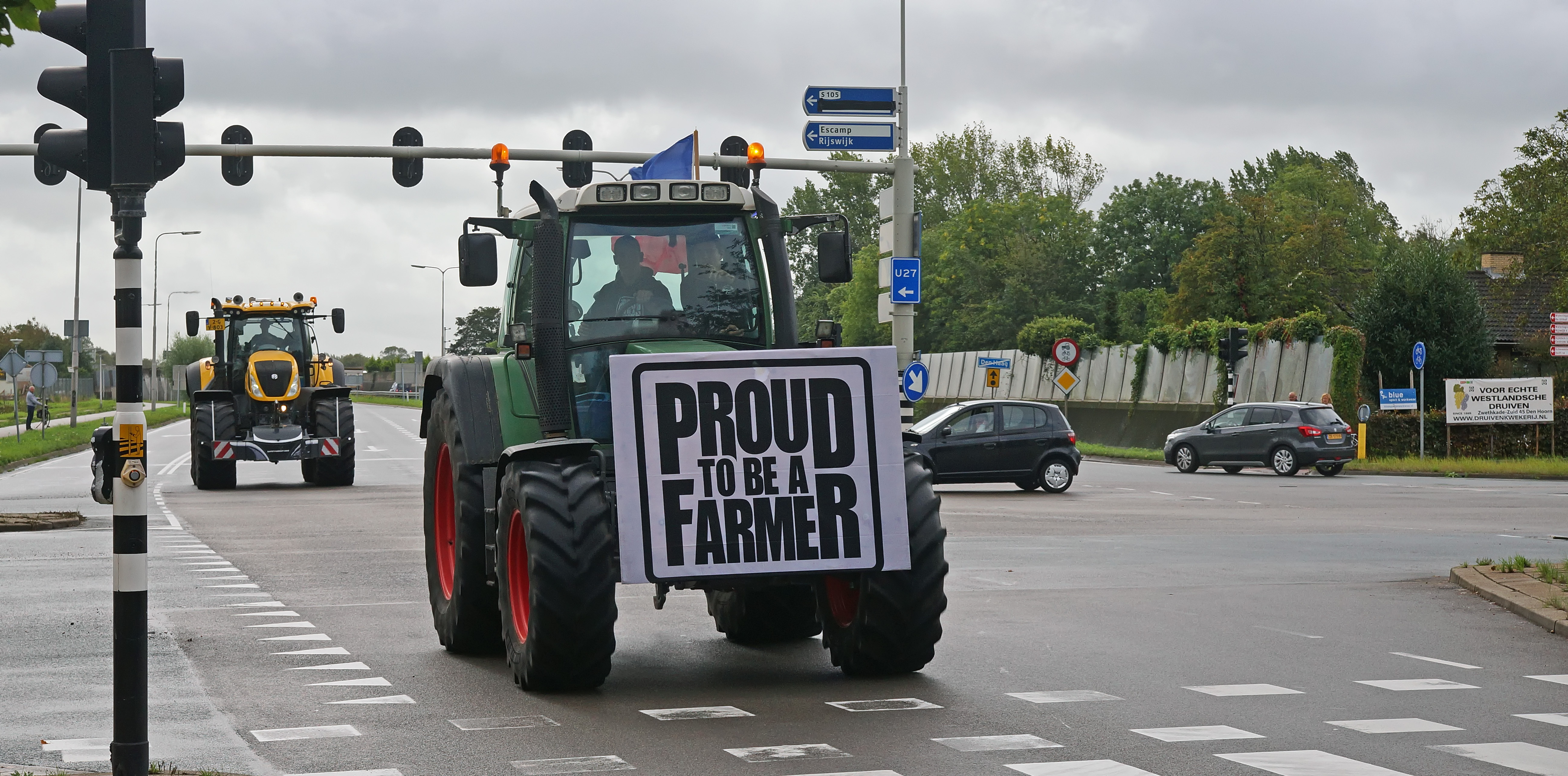
- A farmer protesting in The Hague, 1 October 2019
- Date: 1 October 2019 – present (7 years, 1 month and 3 days)
- Location: Netherlands, local demonstrations in Belgium, Germany, and Canada
- Caused by: Proposals and legislation to limit human impact on the nitrogen cycle by down-scaling industrial livestock production and reducing levels of crude protein in fodder; Animal rights activists' occupation of a pig farm in Boxtel, North Brabant, and the growing influence of the Dutch environmental movement; Perceived public disrespect towards agribusiness
- Goals: Fewer or no nitrogen-related restrictions on livestock farming; Higher prices for agricultural produce; Public respect for the agricultural sector
- Methods: Arson; Barricades; Demonstrations; Flag desecration; Illegal dumping; Internet activism; Intimidation of elected officials, businesses, and activists; Occupations
- Status: Ongoing

Parties
Agricultural interest groups and individuals; Agractie; Farmers Defence Force; Team Agro NL; Voll Gass; Anti-government and COVID-19 protesters; Nederland in Verzet; Samen voor Nederland	(Netherlands) Third Rutte cabinet (until 2022); Minister of Agriculture Carola Schouten; (Netherlands) Fourth Rutte cabinet (2022–2024); Minister of Agriculture Henk Staghouwer (resigned in 2022); Minister of Agriculture Piet Adema; Minister for Nature and Nitrogen Policy Christianne van der Wal; (Netherlands) Schoof cabinet (2024–2026); Minister of Agriculture Femke Wiersma; (Netherlands) Jetten cabinet (since 2026); Minister of Agriculture Jaimi van Essen; Netherlands Armed Forces; Royal Netherlands Army; Royal Marechaussee; National Police Corps; Animal rights and environmental activist groups and individuals

Casualties
- Deaths: 2
- Injuries: At least 12
- Arrested: Over 100

A series of protests by Dutch livestock farmers, characterised by the use of tractors to block roads and occupy public spaces, have been ongoing since 2019. The protests were initially triggered in October 2019 by a proposal in parliament to halve the country's livestock in an attempt to limit agricultural pollution in the Netherlands, but protesting farmers have frequently told media that they are motivated by a perceived lack of respect for their profession by the Dutch populace, media and politicians.

The protests combined several action groups and an amalgamation of larger goals, which included less government regulation for farmers, more air time for pro-farmer sentiments, and more policies to punish Shell and Tata Steel for their part in the emission crisis.

Public understanding for the farmers has remained high for the duration of the conflict, but actual support began to waver by the end of 2019. By July 2020, 55% of people responding to a survey polled by EenVandaag did not support further protests, but just over half of the respondents remained sympathetic to the farmers.

Public understanding remained high through the summer of 2022, while public support for the protests was polled as low as 39% by I&O Research; particularly low support was found among people living in urban areas.

== Background ==
The Netherlands has a significant agrarian and livestock sector, which produces and transits large quantities of agricultural exports. As such, the country is the second largest exporter of agricultural produce in the world after the United States when the exportation of imported agricultural goods, such as cattle and soybeans are included. Large imports of cattle fodder cause an imbalance in the nitrogen cycle. Since the mid-2000s, climate activism and animal rights activism have become more commonplace in the Dutch House of Representatives and general political discourse of the Netherlands, especially with the emergence of the Party for the Animals as a political force. Policy proposals by parties such as the Dutch green party, GroenLinks, and the social liberal D66 have since emphasized the need for farmers to transition into sustainable farming. These policy proposals were consistently met with opposition by farmers and their representatives. Between 1990 and 2010, considerable progress had been made in reducing agricultural pollution, during a series of coalitions between centre-left and centre-right parties. In 2010 however, the centre-right Christian Democratic Appeal and People's Party for Freedom and Democracy formed a minority cabinet with the support of the far-right Party for Freedom. Pollution reduction projects were largely put on hold, while existing regulations were no longer strictly enforced. Even though this First Rutte cabinet proved to be short-lived, it led to a trend break in environmental policy. In reaction, environmental activists began to sue the Dutch state, demanding that the laws would be upheld.

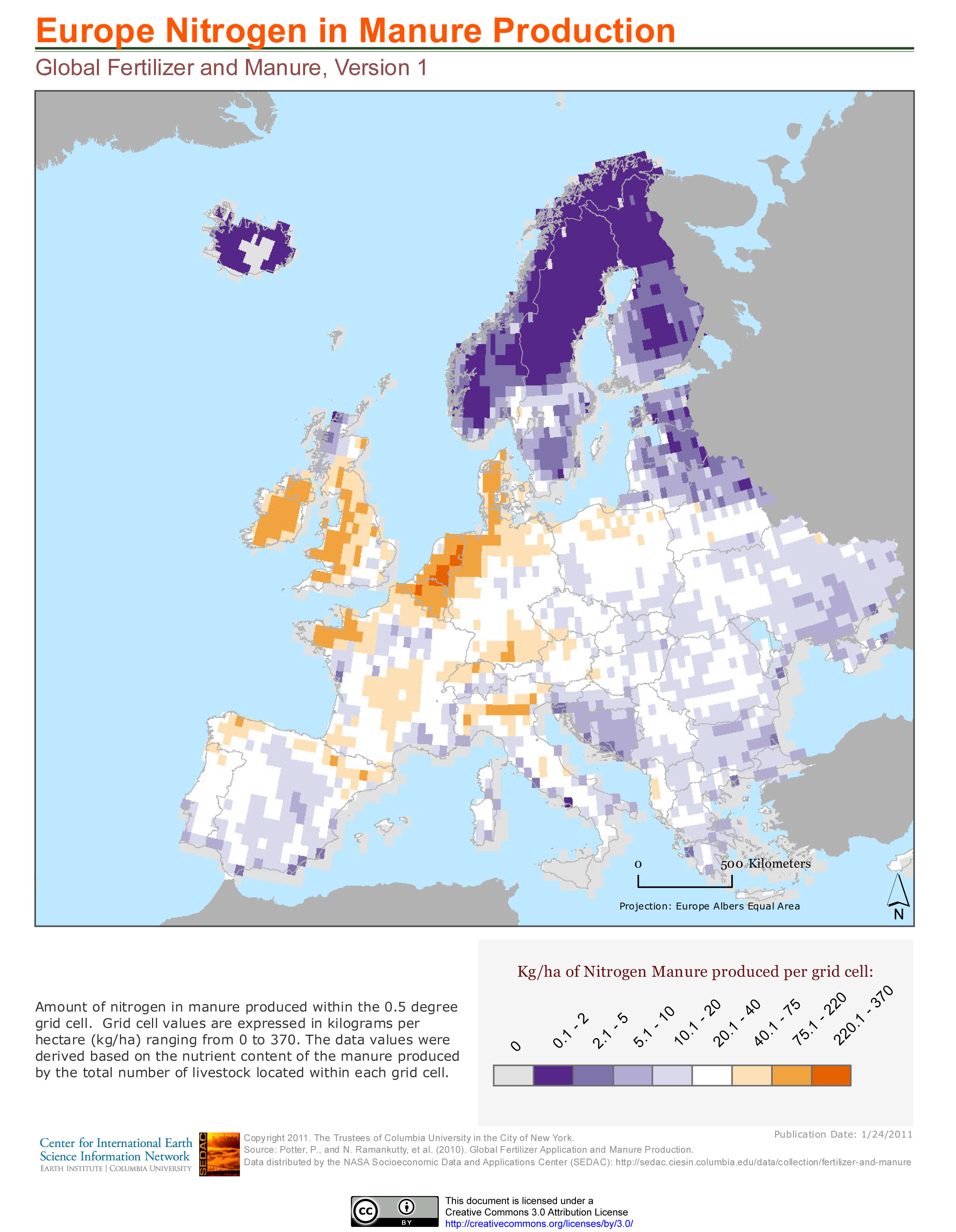
Nitrogen from dung is a significant polluting agent in the Low Countries

In 2019, the Netherlands entered a nitrogen emission crisis when on 29 May the Council of State, the highest Dutch administrative court, ruled that the existing emission policy violated Dutch law and European regulations protecting vulnerable nature reserves and biotopes. In principle no further emission critically impacting such areas was allowed, which threatened to halt a significant part of Dutch building and infrastructural projects, unless their nitrogen output would be compensated by a reduction in agricultural emissions. The National Institute for Public Health and the Environment (RIVM) reported that the severely damaging effects of nitrogen on Dutch soil could only be halted by direct action. The institute found that farmers were responsible for 46% of the country's nitrogen emission, mostly due to cow dung produced by the livestock industry. This situation led Tjeerd de Groot, a member of the House of Representatives for D66, a party in the ruling coalition, to propose new policy to halve the current Dutch livestock on 9 September 2019. The RIVM's findings coupled with De Groot's policy proposal led to resistance by Farmers Defence Force, a farmer activist group. It claimed that the institute had used "shady methods" to "portray" farmers as big time polluters. They claimed that their unfair portrayal as polluters is caused by the governments desire to let the real big time polluters go free. They claimed their fundamental rights were threatened by legislation aiming to lower emissions and demanded that any new legislation would not threaten agricultural undertakings with elimination. They also demanded more research to be undertaken before new legislation be proposed. The government repudiated the accusations of using "shady methods" being used by the RIVM and claimed the numbers were correct.

In addition to the nitrogen emission crisis, Dutch news media have reported that farmers have felt disrespected or threatened in their existence because of increased government regulation on the agricultural and livestock sectors, as well as the popularity of animal rights activism among the Dutch population. An incident that occurred on 13 May 2019, in which up to 200 animal rights activists occupied a pig farm in Boxtel, North Brabant, sowed fear among livestock farmers and motivated them to organize into collectives such as Farmers Defence Force and Agractie, which later became key players in the farmers' protests.

== Protests against halving industrial livestock production (2019–2020) ==
=== October 2019 ===
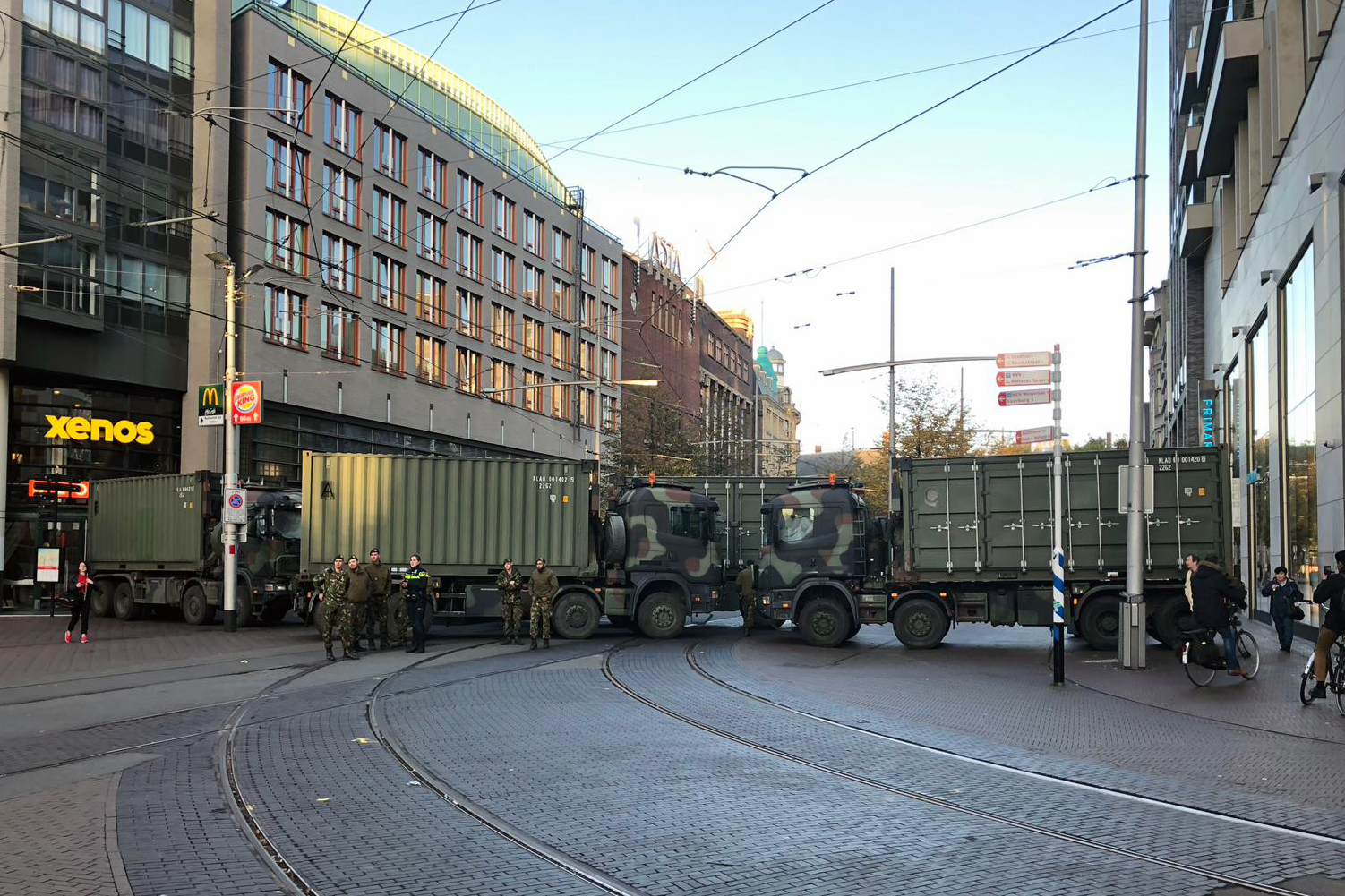
Military blockades in the streets of The Hague, 16 October 2019.

1 October was one of the days with the most intense protests. Thousands of farmers went to The Hague to protest, their tractors causing over a thousand kilometres of traffic jams. This made it the busiest morning rush (hour) in the history of the Netherlands. When arriving at designated location, the Malieveld, the protesters damaged the area, driving through fences and signs and destroying the landscape. Afterwards farmers offered to assist in repairing the damage.

In a speech, sheep farmer Bart Kemp said that politicians lack the intelligence of farmers and claimed that the protests were the biggest ever undertaken by farmers in all of history. Minister Carola Schouten promises in a speech that as long as she is minister of agriculture to regulate the amount of legally allowed livestock, part of the livestock will not be halved, a measure which parties like Democrats 66 supported in order to shrink nitrogen emissions. When proponents of the nitrogen measures got to tell their side of the story the farmers turned their backs to the stage and drowned out their arguments with curse words. The farmers again used unlawful actions, one such example is when a microphone was taken so as to prevent proponents of the climate measures from talking, making necessary the intervention of security personnel.

On 11 October, farmers protested against the new nitrogen emission legislation in the provinces of Friesland and North Brabant. As a result, the Frisian province revoked the law.

At 12:00 on 14 October, employers’ organisation LTO Nederland's protest action began, having called on its 14,000 members to begin protesting in Gelderland, Overijssel, Drenthe, Groningen, North Holland, South Holland, Flevoland and Utrecht. In Groningen the farmers stormed the provincial government building. This was condemned by LTO Nederland.

Farmers from Limburg protested in front of the provincial government headquarters in Maastricht on 15 October. In Zeeland farmers began negotiating instead of holding protests.

On 16 October, protests were organised by Farmers Defence Force, and started at the RIVM building in Bilthoven, later moving to the Binnenhof in The Hague as well as the central train station of the city. During these protests a leader of Farmers Defence Force threatened civil war, claiming that the government using the military was “a cowardly retreat behind a wall of intimidation and violence”. Soldiers were employed to block off streets in order to prevent escalation of the protests. This was a reaction to the violence the farmers employed in Groningen during previous protests.

17 October began with the farmers preparing a free breakfast for the inhabitants of The Hague before they hit the road again, using their tractors to dump used paper at government buildings.

=== November 2019 ===
On 25 November, many farmers and builders parked next to the exits of major roads throughout the country, threatening to block access to them. One farmer declared “we want to come out on top”, insinuating this meant “better policy.”

=== December 2019 ===
When soon enough there will be no more farmers, don't say: wir haben es nicht gewusst.

— Mark van den Oever, referencing the Holocaust during an address to the provincial council of North Brabant on 13 December 2019.

Farmers Defence Force planned to block food distribution throughout the country in the week before Christmas. FDF frontman Mark van den Oever stated that he wanted to refresh Dutch citizens' memories of the Dutch famine of 1944–1945, during which thousands of citizens travelled to the countryside to beg local farmers for food due to shortages in the densely populated western parts of the Netherlands. Next to that, Van den Oever stirred great controversy while comparing the situation of the Dutch farmers to that of the persecution of Jews during World War II. These statements led to both support as well as anger. Out of 4,955 farmers who filled in a survey by agricultural organisation LTO Nederland, 71% did not support potential blockings. 15% did not want any more protests at all. The potential blockings were quickly denounced as illegal.

On 13 December, in a surprise protest, Farmers Defence Force blocked the roads to Eindhoven Airport for several hours, leading to severe traffic jams throughout the eastern part of Brabant. That same day, farmers also held protests in both Amsterdam and Den Bosch. Farmer Defence Force called the surprise protest in Eindhoven a teaser for the 18 December protests.

On 17 December, a court case ruled that the farmers were not allowed to block the food distribution on their planned protest date on 18 December, but were allowed to protest at the locations. The farmers announced protests at 45 different locations, including the Media Park in Hilversum. However, blockings still occurred after all. In Bergen op Zoom, farmers blocked a chemicals company. Several border crossings between the Netherlands and Germany were blocked, sometimes in collaboration with German farmers. The protests led to several fines and several people were arrested by the police for throwing fireworks.

==== "De boer dat is de keerl" Top 2000 voting campaign ====
Team Agro, one of the collective farmer groups, announced their intention to vote Normaal's 1982 single "De boer dat is de keerl" to the top of the annual NPO Radio 2 marathon Top 2000. "De boer dat is de keerl" (Achterhooks for "The farmer, that is the man") is an adaption of a Fiddlin' John Carson American country song and tells the story of the hard-working and undervalued farmer who is deprived of his money. On 7 December, it was announced that "De boer dat is de keerl" was the ninth most voted song, and the top voted song in rural areas such as Twente, Weststellingwerf and Normaal's native Achterhoek region.

=== February 2020 ===
Farmers Defence Force announced a new protest, but canceled it in advance. Talks had been planned for 5 February, between the minister of agriculture Carola Schouten, prime minister Mark Rutte and the different protest groups. The reason the protest was canceled was allegedly because of new calculations of nitrogen emissions of the RIVM and the FDF wanting to wait for a better moment to organize a protest.

The first protest in 2020 was on 19 February. Just like previous protests, this one was also organized by Farmers Defence Force. However, the protest did not take place on the Malieveld in The Hague, because the city of The Hague and Staatsbosbeheer kindly asked them not to. The FDF reached out to the farmers and asked them to adhere to the rules. They protested on the Koekamp, a small park next to the Malieveld instead.

The second difference is the usage of highways. The Dutch National Police stated that they will enforce standard traffic rules. This resulted in a few farmers being pulled over and fined on different roads throughout the country for driving a tractor on motorways, despite Farmers Defence Force stressing that farmers shouldn't make use of motor- or highways.

Different political parties were invited to speech at the protest. The PVV of Geert Wilders, Forum voor Democratie and CDA were invited. Ultimately only FvD and CDA were allowed by Farmers Defence Force to speech on stage. Geert Wilders was rejected by the leaders of the FDF. FDF-member Jeroen van Maanen said on the stage that Wilders would only come if there were cameras or television crews and FDF would not allow that.

After the protest ended around 3 pm, a few farmers made their way to the Ministry for Agriculture. They were stopped by the police before they could reach the ministry building. The farmers carried stickers of the FDF, which they wanted to put on the building.

== Protests against reduction of crude protein levels in fodder (2020) ==
On 6 May 2020, Minister Schouten announced that she would set a maximum for the crude protein content in fodder for dairy cattle that would take effect in September 2020. The goal of this legislation was to reduce nitrogen emissions in the short term so that houses could be built to combat the ongoing shortage of affordable housing in the Netherlands. This was criticized by farmers because it would be bad for the health of the animals and would lead to lower production.

=== July 2020 ===
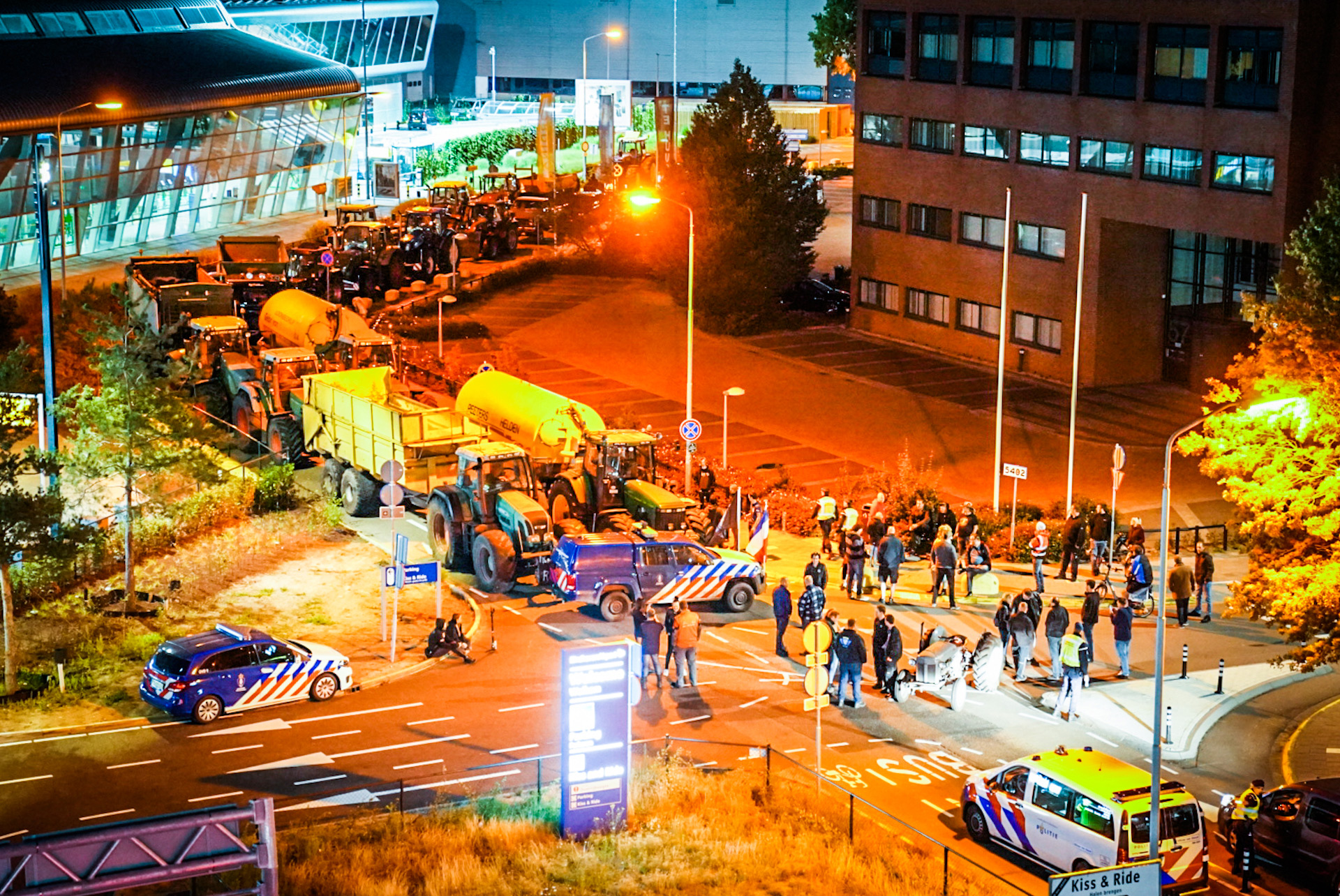
Farmers Defence Force protesters and Royal Marechaussee personnel at Eindhoven Airport, 5 July 2020

Expecting a strong reaction to the announced measures before the government's summer recess, the military again readied 25 trucks and 60 soldiers to cordon off roads in The Hague.

On 8 July, there was a demonstration at a waste processing plant in Wijster, Drenthe, which resulted in the arrests of 57 farmers.

Dozens of tractors blocked an Albert Heijn distribution center in Zwolle on 10 July. Albert Heijn was temporarily unable to supply 230 stores due to the blockade. In addition, the headquarters of Jumbo in Veghel, and Eindhoven Airport were blocked with tractors.

On 12 July the Farmers went to protest in Maastricht.

=== October 2020 ===
When D66 leader Rob Jetten was in home quarantine because of a COVID infection, five members of Farmers Defence Force made an unannounced late-night visit to his private home to offer him a food package. It contained several types of meat, which was chosen on purpose—'playfully' according to the FDF—because Jetten is a vegetarian, 'for his health'. Jetten and fellow politicians responded that, despite the activists' supposedly good intentions, it was highly inappropriate (and even intimidating) to visit the private addresses of politicians you disagree with, unannounced and in the dark of night.

=== November 2020 ===
On 17 November there was another farmer's protest in The Hague. The Malieveld was again heavily damaged, a COVID shelter for the homeless was blocked, and a cyclist was hit by a tractor.

=== December 2020 ===
Farmers' demonstrations returned in mid-December because, according to some farmers, supermarkets were paying too little for their products and in protest against nitrogen limitation legislation. On 11 and 12 December, farmers blocked the entrance to a Jumbo supply center in Raalte and demonstrations also took place in Oosterhout and Geldermalsen. Also on 12 December, farmers blocked the Albert Heijn distribution center in Zwolle and briefly the Zaanstad distribution center on 13 December. 4,500 customers did not receive their orders from Albert Heijn and 1,700 from Jumbo.

Mayor Peter Snijders of Zwolle (also chairman of the IJsselland Security Region) gave the farmers an ultimatum, after which they left. Angered, Snijders stated that a line had been crossed: "After two major blockades at this distribution center, I have now reached the point that I can not let this go on. Especially during this COVID pandemic, it is risky to do this now. There are people who cannot go to the supermarket because of an infection." Moreover, according to him, the protest was disorganized, people did not adhere to the COVID guidelines and the police had to intervene. He advocated national rules around farmer protests, like other mayors had also proposed. Albert Heijn stated that it would not negotiate with "groups that do not adhere to the agreements made".

On 14 December, dozens of tractors blocked the Jumbo distribution center in Breda for six hours and a dozen farmers also blocked the residence of Jumbo director Frits van Eerd. Agricultural minister Schouten condemned actions that affected "ordinary people who work and do their grocery shopping" and that the security regions should tackle this. Even the radical Farmers Defence Force thought the blockades went too far and discouraged farmers from demonstrating at distribution centers. This may have been because, according to the FDF, the trade association Central Bureau for Food Trade (CBL) had threatened to take the FDF to court and have its members pay for damages.

== Protests against new proposals to tackle the nitrogen crisis (2021) ==
=== July 2021 ===
Protests returned on 7 July in response to new government proposals on tackling the nitrogen crisis. Agractie came with tractors to the Malieveld in The Hague and members of Farmers Defence Force protested in (the vicinity of) Zwolle, Assen, Arnhem, and Den Bosch. Protests at the Malieveld were more peaceful than before. Member of parliament Tjeerd de Groot did not need security during his visit to the protest, for instance, and he was able to freely converse with the farmers, unlike eighteen months earlier.

== Protests against minister Van der Wal's new nitrogen policy (2022–2023) ==
=== June 2022 ===
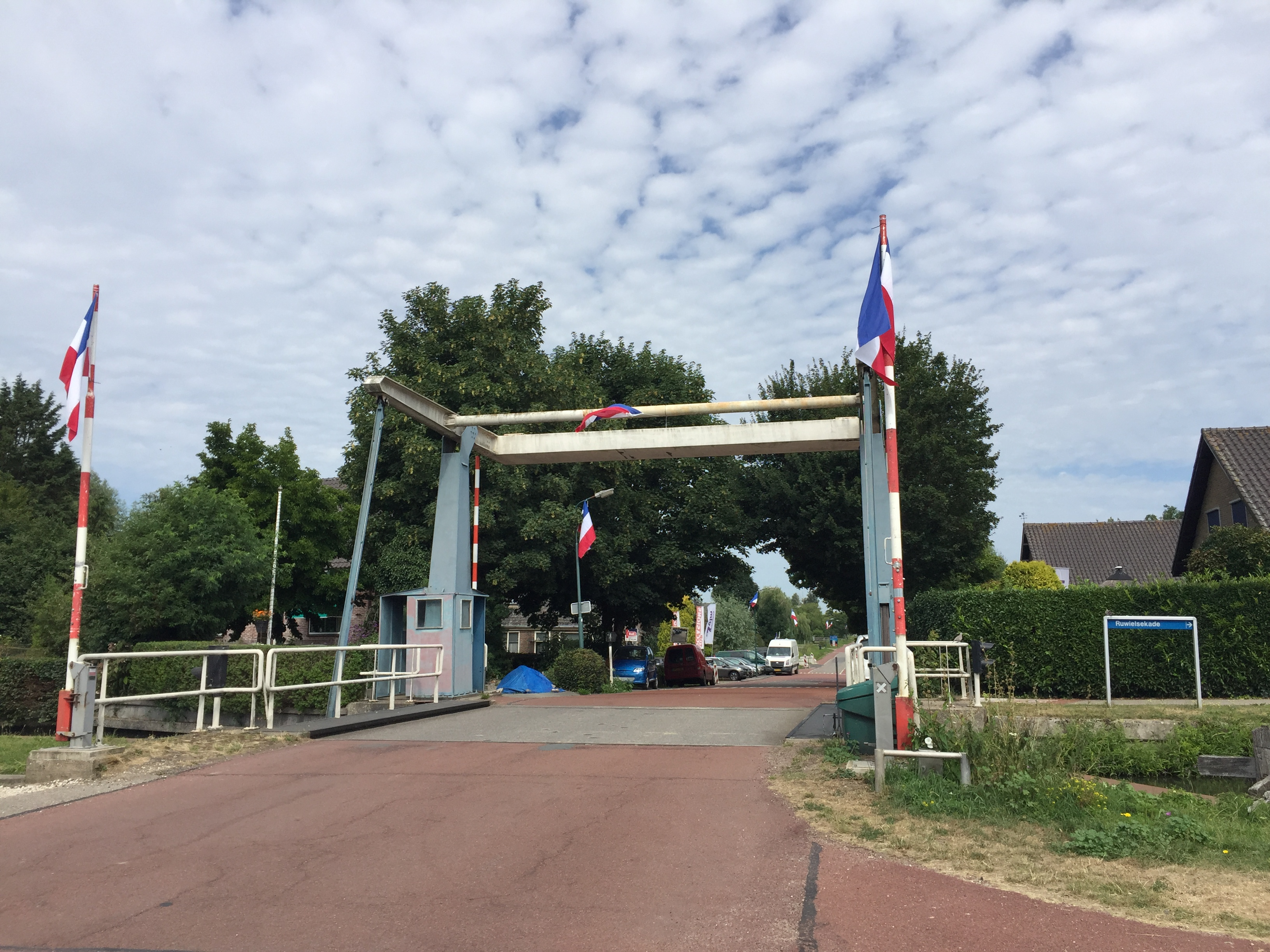
Upside-down Dutch flags on a bridge in Kockengen, Utrecht. The use and desecration of national symbols became a point of public contention during the 2022 protests.

On 10 June 2022 the protests returned to prominence after the government designated €24.3 billion to finance agricultural reforms that will likely make many farmers drastically reduce their number of livestock or get rid of them altogether. The government's proposal aims to halve nitrogen oxide and ammonia pollution in the country by 2030. According to government estimates, this could lead to the closure of about 30 percent of livestock farms in the Netherlands.

In the evening of 14 June, angry farmers with tractors blocked the track between Vorden and Winterswijk and chained down two trains at Lichtenvoorde-Groenlo railway station. In their own words, they wanted to "prevent the diesel train on the Lievelde-Winterswijk route from emitting nitrogen any longer in the beautiful Natura 2000 area Korenburgerveen".

Initially, a large-scale protest was planned for 22 June in The Hague, but this was moved to Stroe, Gelderland to conduct a more positive demonstration. The National Coordinator for Security and Counterterrorism (NCTV) advised MPs Thom van Campen of the VVD, Tjeerd de Groot of D66, and Derk Boswijk of the CDA against going to the protests, because their safety could not be guaranteed. Van Campen and De Groot decided to heed the NCTV's advice, but Boswijk visited the protest anyway. It became one of the largest farmers' protests with tens of thousands of attendants. Despite discouragement from LTO Nederland, arriving and departing farmers again drove their tractors on the highways. This led to traffic jams and a serious accident on the A12 motorway.

On 27 June, protesters blocked a number of highways with tractors and hay bales. Farmers also protested at the provincial government building of North Brabant. Again, there was also a group of farmers who protested at the residence of minister for Nature and Nitrogen Policy Christianne van der Wal. The next day, hay bales were set on fire along several highways.

Protests resumed on 28 June. Among others, there was a demonstration at the House of Representatives, where motions were being voted on. In the evening, there were also protests at the homes of minister Van der Wal and CDA MP Derk Boswijk.

On 29 June, the city of Apeldoorn implemented a state of emergency due to demonstrations and an alleged jailbreak attempt by protestors to free previously arrested activists in custody at the local police station.

=== July 2022 ===
On 1 July, the city of Harderwijk declared a state of emergency in preparation of a demonstration organized by the anti-government protest group Nederland in Verzet (English: Netherlands in Resistance).

On 4 July, farmers began blocking roads with parked vehicles to shut down logistical chains for food distribution, including denying access to supermarkets. Riot police were called into Heerenveen and deployed tear gas to break up protests.

On 5 July, a canal bridge in Gaarkeuken, Groningen was blocked with around 50 tractors until 6 pm, stopping 50 vessels from passing Gaarkeuken Lock. On the same day, the A37 motorway was briefly blockaded with tractors, resulting in a 2-kilometre traffic jam.

In the evening of 5 July, police fired shots at a 16-year-old youngster driving a tractor after attempting to blockade a highway in Friesland; nobody was injured but the youngster was arrested. On 22 July, the Dutch Department of Justice announced the start of a criminal investigation into the incident, concerning whether the actions of the officer in question constituted attempted murder. Also in July, some fishermen began blockading ports in solidarity with the farmers.

At the end of July, several farmers dumped waste on highways, especially on the A18. This caused accidents, and motorists who wanted to clean up the waste were verbally abused by the farmers and threatened with violence. At least one farmer was caught in flagrante and received a community service order of 80 hours, a suspended prison sentence of one week, and a claim of more than 3,000 euros for expenses incurred by the Rijkswaterstaat. Another farmer was sentenced to 100 hours of community service, a suspended 60 days prison term, and a claim of damages amounting to 3,600 euros.

=== September 2022 ===
On 20 September, tens of farmers attempted to enter the city center of The Hague with their tractors to protest during Prinsjesdag, in defiance of a state of emergency declared for the duration of festivities. Consequently, authorities confiscated six vehicles and arrested five protesters. Both mayor Jan van Zanen and minister of Justice and Security Dilan Yeşilgöz-Zegerius emphasized that the farmers were allowed to protest, but without heavy equipment.

A threatening situation arose during a provincial agricultural commission meeting in Zwolle on 21 September, where plans regarding the protection of the Natura 2000 area Bergvennen en Brecklenkampse Veld were being presented for a vote. Angered by the possibility of agricultural activity in the area being cut back or shut down, a group of local farmers scolded and intimidated the commission members. The vote was postponed for a month.

On 23 September, ten farmers who had participated in the violent protests at the home of minister Van der Wal on 28 June were sentenced to community service orders of 60 to 100 hours, eight of whom also received suspended prison terms of up to a month. An eleventh protester, a minor, is to serve 80 hours of community service. The Public Prosecution Service has yet to announce charges against an additional 24 suspects who were arrested since the return of protests in the summer of 2022.

=== Later protests ===
A group of farmers from Batavia handed out fruit and vegetables at the market of Nijmegen on 29 October 2022 to "help people with small incomes in the current time of rising energy bills" and to renew attention for the farmers' discontent with nitrogen-related legislation.

On 19 February 2023, deputy prime minister Sigrid Kaag was confronted by pro-farmer protesters in Diepenheim, Overijssel, where she was campaigning for D66 in the upcoming provincial elections. Kaag attempted to engage the torch-wielding group in conversation and later concluded that those present had been out to intimidate her. Prime minister Mark Rutte publicly disapproved of the protesters' actions, calling them "rude, inappropriate, and unacceptable", and second deputy prime minister Wopke Hoekstra considered the event an "absolute disgrace".

==== 2023 Zuiderpark protest ====
Demonstrations in support of the farmers returned to The Hague on 11 March 2023, organized by Farmers Defence Force and "non-political freedom movement" Samen voor Nederland, among a number of other anti-government and COVID-19 protest groups. In addition to their disapproval of the nitrogen policy, up to 25,000 protesters also directed their ire at the slow resolution of the Dutch childcare benefits scandal and in favor of compensation for damages incurred by land subsidence and earthquakes caused by gas production in Groningen. The dispersed nature of these demonstrations and ongoing threats against Farmer–Citizen Movement leader Caroline van der Plas, who did not attend the event due to concerns for her safety, led to Agractie and LTO Nederland disavowing support and participation. Alongside Van der Plas, Wybren van Haga of Belang van Nederland, Geert Wilders of the Party for Freedom, Thierry Baudet of Forum for Democracy, and Roelof Bisschop of the Reformed Political Party had also been invited to speak to the protesters, while representatives of the ruling coalition parties were expressly not.

At the conclusion of a protest-filled day, which also included a blockade of the A12 motorway by demonstrators of Extinction Rebellion (XR) protesting against fossil fuel subsidies, police announced they had taken 700 people into custody, which included a protester who had rammed park fencing with a loader, and issued 12 fines to truck drivers who had parked their vehicles illegally. The overwhelming number of arrests had been made at the XR occupation, however, where the use of a water cannon resulted in hypothermia among protesters and sparked debate on police misconduct and proportionality.

== Protests following the breakdown of negotiations between farmers and minister Adema (since 2023) ==
Following up on the advice of former Deputy Prime Minister and "nitrogen negotiator" Johan Remkes, in January 2023 Minister of Agriculture Piet Adema had opened negotiations with farmers' organisations, nature and environmental organizations, and provincial governments to reach 'meaningful agreements' for the future of agriculture in the Netherlands. On 20 June, LTO Nederland left the negotiations, feeling the government had taken minimal steps to offer farmers prospects and income security. The other participants indicated that continuing without the LTO would lack credibility and ended the negotiations.

=== June 2023 ===
Farmers Defense Force announced a protest on 29 June 2023 in response to the parliamentary debate on the failed negotiations. A state of emergency was declared in The Hague, but contrary to FDF claims of an expected turnout of thousands, only a few hundred people participated. Caroline van der Plas of the BBB was expected to speak at the protest, but cancelled her appearance after FDF refused to condemn the leaking of telephone numbers of CDA MPs on the internet the day before. Wybren van Haga of BVNL, Pepijn van Houwelingen of FVD, and Edgar Mulder of the PVV did address the protesters during the debate and recess. The low turnout, the refusal of LTO and Agractie to support the protest, the absences of expected speakers, and police intervention ensured that the protesters returned home earlier than planned.

== Domestic impact ==
In response to the first protests, Nature and Environmental Federations and GroenLinks claimed the farmers wrongly directed their anger at citizens and politicians. According to them, the agricultural system, including the farmers' organisations, Rabobank, and supermarkets, is to blame for their predicament.

In late October 2019, construction workers and contractors, who were hit even harder as they were out of work without new building contracts following the new nitrogen and PFASs legislation, also took to the streets. Geert Wilders, leader of the Party for Freedom, proposed a 6-month contingency plan in which construction of housing, infrastructure and the majority of agribusiness are classed as essential projects for the country and as such temporarily exempt from the new nitrogen legislation. A deal was struck between the cabinet and the farmers organizations in December, but the collective of builders and farmers would continue their protests.

=== Reactions to violence ===
Jan Brouwer, director of the Center for Public Order and Safety, felt that the violent protests in Groningen on 14 October 2019 "exceeded the limits of the right to demonstrate." Various politicians, including Helma Lodders, agriculture spokesperson for the VVD, argued that the farmers had gone too far. There was also frustration about "the 'weak knees' of some provincial administrators."

Following the protests on 16 October 2019, during which four people were arrested for assaulting and disobeying the police, prime minister Mark Rutte of the VVD indicated that protesters must adhere to the rules. Gert-Jan Segers of the Christian Union emphasized that farmers "may not transgress." Pieter Heerma of the CDA indicated that farmers are allowed to express their dissatisfaction, but that they "may not intimidate or cause insecurity."

The Public Prosecution Service said that the government had failed by hardly taking action against tractors on the highways in the autumn of 2019. According to prosecutor Linda Bregman, the highway ban could not be sufficiently enforced by the police, due to the farmers' "threatening and intimidating behavior" and excessive alcohol consumption.

=== Public opinion ===
Following the initial protests on 1 October 2019, the farmers enjoyed broad popular support among the Dutch population, and farmers' demonstrations were facilitated by local officials, such as the mayor of The Hague. This drew some scrutiny, especially in the aftermath of mass arrests at Extinction Rebellion protests between 7 and 12 October. Halfway through October, understanding and support for the farmers' protests had started to decline, but remained significant, per EenVandaag and RTL Nieuws. On 13 December, comments made by Farmers Defence Force spokesperson Mark van den Oever, comparing the treatment of farmers to the persecution of Jews during World War II, were widely condemned. The protests at Eindhoven Airport and threats to block food distribution centers further eroded popular support.

EenVandaag reported that around half of the respondents to its opinion polls had "a lot or quite a bit" of understanding for the farmers' actions on 19 February and 14 July 2020.

In October 2021 (with polling taking place between 6 and 20 September), 38% of pollees in a survey by I&O Research indicated that they fully supported the farmers' protests. 32% did not support the farmers' protests, 27% were neutral, and 3% were unsure.

On 22 June 2022, EenVandaag reported that understanding for the farmers had returned to a level not seen since October 2019. Around the same time, market researcher Ipsos found that 66% of its respondents had understanding for the protests, contrasted by 12% who did not. In July 2022 (15-18 July) support for the farmers' protests per I&O Research was polled at 39% as opposition increased to 35%. Opinions on the protests seemed to have polarized along political lines and degree of urbanity, as progressive left-wing voters and urban dwellers have grown increasingly critical of the protests. EenVandaag reported on 28 July that although 60% of its 15,000 pollees continued to sympathize with the farmers, 72% did not support the protests of late July, which had seen protesters dump and burn hay bales and waste on highways—including sheets of the carcinogen asbestos—and intimidate contractors sent to clear the roads. Less disruptive methods of protest in comparison, such as demonstrating outside the House of Representatives and other government agencies, and flying the national flag upside down enjoyed the approval of 66% and 55% of respondents, respectively. Similarly, Ipsos' July survey found that public understanding for the farmers' protests had entered a downward trend, which continued in August and September 2022.

Understanding for the farmers' actions (EenVandaag opinion panel)
Date	A lot or quite a bit	Little or none
1 October 2019	89%	11%
10 October 2019	72%	27%
16 October 2019	60%	38%
19 February 2020	49%	50%
14 July 2020	51%	49%
22 June 2022	63%	36%
28 July 2022	60%	–

"I fully support the farmers' protests against the nitrogen measures" (I&O Research)
Period	Agree	Neutral	Disagree	Don't know
6-20 September 2021	38%	27%	32%	3%
17-20 June 2022	45%	25%	26%	4%
15-18 July 2022	39%	24%	35%	3%

"I have understanding for the farmers' protests that have arisen as a result of the new nitrogen policy" (Ipsos)
Period	(Fully) agree	Neutral	(Fully) disagree
24-27 June 2022	66%	17%	12%
22-25 July 2022	59%	18%	15%
26-29 August 2022	57%	18%	20%
23-26 September 2022	52%	24%	19%

=== 2019–2020 terrorist threat assessment ===
In May 2020, the National Coordinator for Security and Counterterrorism (NCTV) published a report on the current terrorist threat in the Netherlands, in which it was stated that the farmers' protests were generally peaceful, but that Farmers Defence Force in particular regularly transgressed and contributed to social polarization through "unsubtle and threatening statements against politicians and fellow farmers with differing opinions" and physical aggression, for example by pelting motorcycle police officers with fireworks and ramming the door of the provincial government building in Groningen. The FDF denied involvement in said incidents.

As early as December 2019, the NCTV reported on attempts at cross-pollination between the protesting farmers and anti-government agitators, which had already contributed to radicalization in Drenthe and Groningen. After the arrival of the COVID-19 pandemic in the Netherlands, the farmers' protests were eclipsed by criticism of and protests against the Dutch government response to the COVID-19 pandemic. In October 2020, the NCTV warned that the grievances of the farmers had been co-opted by conspiracy theorists and political extremists who had also become a driving force behind the nascent COVID-19 protests. Particular mention was made of financial support to the farmers by the ultraconservative publisher De Blauwe Tijger, referred to by the NCTV as "a conduit for anti-government propaganda, fake news and conspiracy theories."

=== Reactions from the animal rights movement ===
From the first farmers' protest on the Malieveld on 1 October 2019, small numbers of vegans and animal rights activists have staged counter-demonstrations. They said they were not against farmers as a whole, but only against livestock farming and advocated plant foods as a solution to environmental problems, including the nitrogen crisis, as well as to reduce animal suffering. The animal rights and vegan activists found little understanding from the protesting farmers and were even seen as partly responsible for their difficult situation, threatened, spat on, and pelted. CDA-prominent and farmer Henk Bleker spoke to the farmer demonstrators on the first day of protests, saying "Don't be provoked today! Don't let a handful of loser vegans or animal rights activists scare you. Look down on them." Bleker claimed afterwards that he wanted to prevent farmers' aggression towards the vegans and animal rights activists (in retaliation for the occupation of the stables in Boxtel), but according to some vegans this set the tone for further contempt.

With the return of largescale farmers' protests in the summer of 2022, threats against agricultural businesses and interest groups also appeared on social media. A man from Emmen, for instance, posted a recruitment message for an 'Animal Defence Force' on Facebook, writing that "the extreme farmer scum must be tracked down and locked up. They are right-wing nationalists and comparable to Nazis towards animals." In response to threats of farm occupations and livestock liberation, the Ministry of Justice and Security and LTO Nederland had collaborated on a fact sheet for potential targets of activism in November 2019, but some felt more preventative action was needed. Wybren van Haga, leader of Belang van Nederland, proposed tougher sentences for "extremists who terrify hardworking farmers" and supports adopting right-to-farm laws similar to the 'Right to Farm Policy' in New South Wales, Australia, which could see offending activists jailed for up to three years and fined up to €13,433.

=== Home visits by protesters ===
Visits by groups of farmers and pro-farmer activists to the businesses and private residences of opposing or dissenting politicians and activists revived the public debate about the limits of freedom of speech, freedom of assembly and the right to protest. There was general consensus that the action was not punishable, but it was considered intimidating and agreed on that debate should not be conducted in the private sphere of politicians and other involved parties. According to article 285b of the Criminal Code, "infringing someone's privacy" is punishable, although in practice it turned out to be difficult to legally distinguish the private sphere from the public space.

Not all home visits have been tolerated, however; a man wielding a torch and using menacing language outside the residence of minister Sigrid Kaag in January 2022, for example, was sentenced to five months in prison for threats of violence, incitement, and disruption of the democratic process. Others who received unwelcome visits by protesters include D66 politician Rob Jetten, Normaal singer Bennie Jolink, minister Christianne van der Wal and politicians Tjeerd de Groot (D66) and Derk Boswijk (CDA), LTO Nederland chairman and CDA politician Sjaak van der Tak, Agractie frontman Bart Kemp, and BoerenNatuur chairman Alex Datema.

=== 2023 election results ===
The agrarian and right-wing populist political party Farmer–Citizen Movement (Dutch: BoerBurgerBeweging, BBB) was founded in response to the protests in 2019 and has been led by agricultural journalist and former CDA member Caroline van der Plas since October 2020. In the 2021 general election, the party pledged for the creation of a "Ministry of the Countryside" (Dutch: ministerie van Platteland) located at least 100 kilometers from The Hague and a removal of the ban on neonicotinoids. In addition, the BBB calls for right-to-farm laws, which would allow for farmers to have more say on agricultural expansion matters, in response to local opposition to pig and goat farms over public health, environmental and agricultural concerns.

The party achieved major victories in the provincial elections and water board elections on 15 March 2023 and following the Senate election on 30 May, the BBB under former VVD alderwoman Ilona Lagas entered the Senate with 16 seats, becoming the largest party. By comparison, the left-wing political alliance of GroenLinks–PvdA won 14 seats and coalition party VVD held on to 10 seats.

Opinion polls in the run-up to the next Dutch general election showed the BBB in a convincing lead following the elections in March. After the fall of the fourth Rutte cabinet in July 2023, however, the newly founded New Social Contract of former CDA prominent Pieter Omtzigt assumed the lead. On 22 November, the 2023 general election took place and the BBB won a modest seven seats, down from a projected victory of 36 seats in April.

== International reactions ==
- Political commentator and former Forum for Democracy hopeful Eva Vlaardingerbroek made an appearance on the American show Tucker Carlson Tonight on 7 July 2022 to discuss the farmers' protests. During the interview, she told host Tucker Carlson that the Dutch government's attempts at reducing agricultural pollution is part of their contribution to the "Great Reset" conspiracy theory, arguing that the "farmers are hardworking, God-fearing and especially self-sufficient people that are just standing in the way of their globalist agenda." In reference to the far-right "Great Replacement" conspiracy theory, Vlaardingerbroek claimed that the government intended to evict the farmers from their land to "house new immigrants". Similarly, American author and right-wing social media influencer Tucker Max published a series of tweets explaining his belief that the restrictions on the livestock farmers are part of a global scheme to starve the populace into submission, urging his followers to make preparations and achieve food self-sufficiency.
- On 15 July 2022, a video appeared on Twitter, Telegram, and Facebook, calling for worldwide protests on 23 July in solidarity with the farmers. An inquiry by the investigative journalist platform Pointer of the KRO-NCRV uncovered that alongside Dutch anti-government protester and Nederland in Verzet spokesman Michel Reijinga, those behind the call to action were the American CloutHub founder and CEO Jeff Brain, the Canadian far-right media outlet Rebel News, and the Canadian alternative media outlet The Counter Signal. Despite domestic support from COVID-19 protest groups, it appeared none of the Dutch farmers' interest groups had been invited to participate. On 23 July, a 'slow-roll' protest in Ottawa attracted 150 to 200 attendees and resulted in one arrest, while on Dam Square in Amsterdam 1,000 protesters watched a pre-recorded message from former U.S. National Security Advisor Michael Flynn.
- Former U.S. President Donald Trump expressed support for the Dutch farmers during a two-hour speech at Turning Point USA's Student Action Summit in Tampa, Florida, on 23 July 2022. He would go on to claim that climate change is a hoax and that attempts to protect the climate would lead to "famine and starvation," further asserting that there were food shortages already and that the Dutch government had instructed the farmers to get rid of their cattle and forbade them from farming their lands or using fertilizer. Other right-wing populist leaders who expressed their support for the protesters were French politician Marine Le Pen of the National Rally, Polish deputy prime minister and minister of agriculture Henryk Kowalczyk of the Law and Justice party, and Polish member of parliament Jarosław Sachajko of Kukiz'15. In addition, British comedian-turned-YouTuber Russell Brand informed his 5.8 million subscribers that the Dutch nitrogen reduction legislation was part of the "Great Reset" conspiracy theory.

== See also ==
- List of protests in the 21st century
- Nitrogen crisis in the Netherlands
- Manure crisis in the Netherlands
- 1963 Dutch farmers' revolt in Hollandscheveld, Drenthe
- 1971 Dutch farmers' revolt in Tubbergen, Overijssel
- 1989–1990 Dutch farmers' protests
- 2020–2021 Indian farmers' protest
- 2024–2025 Indian farmers' protest
- 2024–2026 United Kingdom farmers' protests
