= Raoul Boucke =

Dutch politician (born 1975)

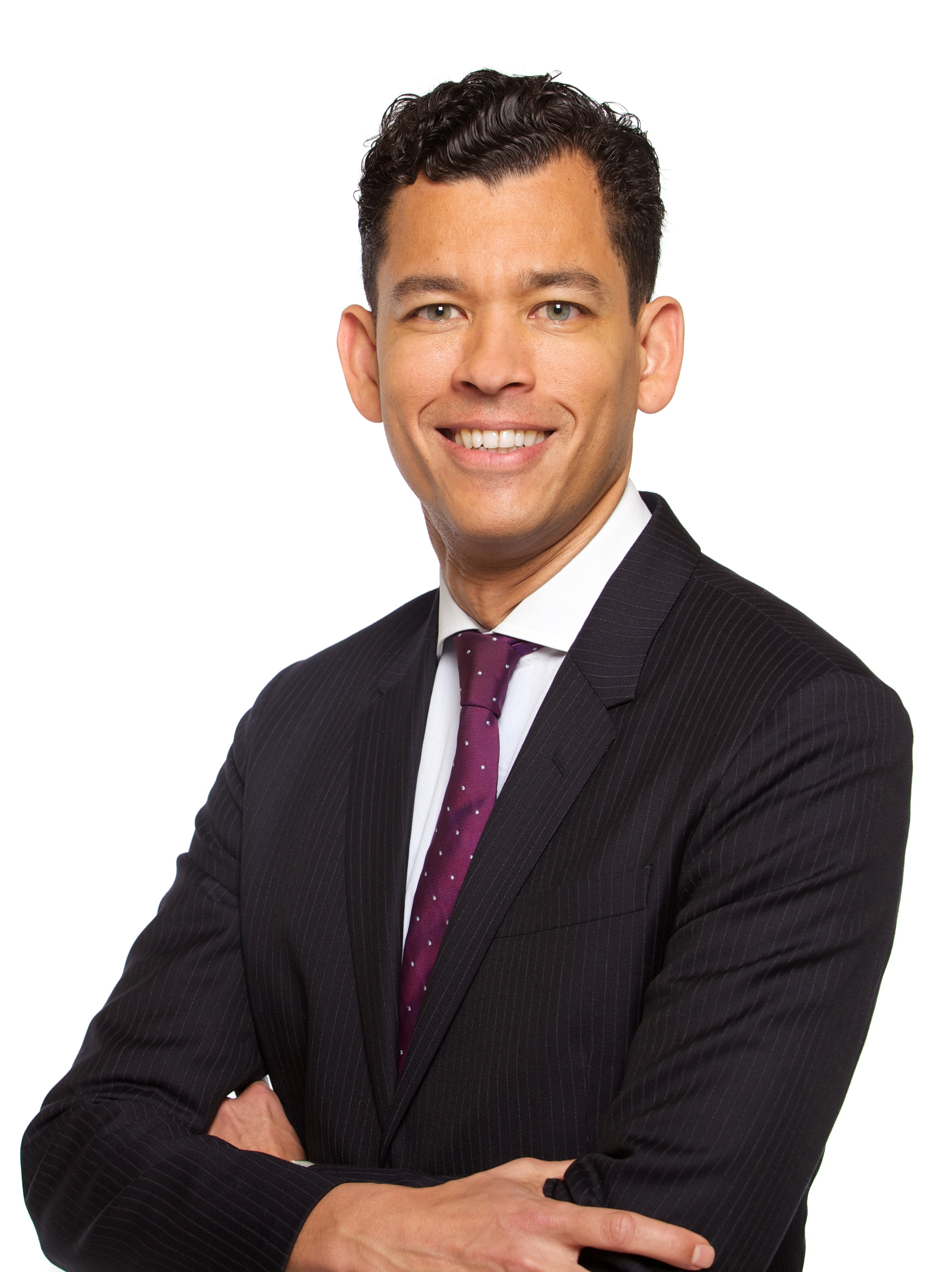
- Boucke in 2014

Member of the House of Representatives
- In office 31 March 2021 – 5 December 2023

Personal details
- Born: Raoul Marc Boucke; 1 November 1975 (age 50) Paramaribo, Suriname
- Party: Democrats 66
- Education: Delft University of Technology
- Occupation: Civil servant, politician

Raoul Marc Boucke (born 1 November 1975) is a Surinamese-Dutch civil servant and politician, who has served as a member of the House of Representatives since 2021. He is a member of the social liberal party Democrats 66 (D66). Prior to his political career, Boucke worked for two government ministries, the European Commission, as well as the Dutch representation to the European Union.

== Early life and education ==
Boucke was born in 1975 in the Surinamese capital Paramaribo. He grew up in Moengo with his brother and sister, and his family moved to Paramaribo when Boucke was eight years old. There, he attended the high school Miranda Lyceum. Boucke emigrated to the Netherlands in 1993 to study chemical engineering at the Delft University of Technology. He graduated eight years later and became a Dutch citizen in 2002.

== Career ==
After completing his study, Boucke took a job at the Ministry of Housing, Spatial Planning and the Environment, working on international affairs. He started working as a civil servant for the European Union (EU) in Brussels in 2007. He was first employed for four years by the permanent representation of the Netherlands to the EU, focusing on the environment, and subsequently served as an advisor on carbon markets to the Directorate-General for Climate Action of the European Commission. In 2016, he returned to the Dutch permanent representation with transport as specialization. He left that job in January 2020 to work at the Ministry of Infrastructure and Water Management on aviation.

Boucke became a member of Democrats 66 in 2002 and, starting in 2011, served as the chair of D66 in Belgium and Luxembourg, a position he would hold until 2017. Boucke ran for Member of the European Parliament (MEP) in the 2014 election, being placed fifth on D66's party list. He received 6,663 preferential votes, but was not elected due to his party winning four seats. In the next election five years later, Boucke appeared second on D66's party list. During the campaign, he supported introducing a European carbon tax and lowering the voting age from eighteen to sixteen. Once again, Boucke was not elected; D66 won two seats, but the number three on the party list, Samira Rafaela, received more preferential votes than Boucke's 22,500.

He ran for member of parliament in the 2021 general election, appearing on the D66's party list as their tenth candidate. He was elected this time and received 3,518 preferential votes. Boucke was sworn in as member of parliament on 31 March and was his party's spokesperson for climate, energy, aviation, mining, and fortifying Groningen homes against gas-extraction-induced quakes. He is on the parliamentary Committees for Agriculture, Nature and Food Quality; for Economic Affairs and Climate Policy; for European Affairs (vice chair); and for Infrastructure and Water Management, as well as on the Belgium contact group. Boucke pled for large-scale investments in hydrogen fuel for the industrial sector in order to mitigate climate change. He also argued in an opinion piece that there will no longer be place in the Netherlands for some polluting companies in the industrial sector. He called on the cabinet to publish a list and to favor companies that could stay when granting subsidies related to sustainability as well as for financial aid during the 2021–2022 global energy crisis. In 2023, a motion by Boucke and Faissal Boulakjar (D66) was carried by the House to urge the government to require large car parks to be covered with solar panels. It followed an earlier motion by the Farmer–Citizen Movement (BBB) to investigate the idea's viability. Boucke and Suzanne Kröger (GroenLinks) filed a motion in October of the same year, calling on the government to create scenarios for the phasing out of its roughly €40 billion in yearly fossil fuel subsidies. While awaiting its passage, the environmental movement Extinction Rebellion suspended its month-long blockade of the A12 motorway in The Hague, organized in protest of those subsidies. The movement announced no more blockades would be held until the Christmas break after a majority of the House supported the motion a week later.

When the collapse of the fourth Rutte cabinet triggered a November 2023 snap election, Boucke announced he would not seek another term. Instead, he intended to run for a seat in the European Parliament in 2024.

== Personal life ==
Boucke lives in Rotterdam and is openly gay. He is married and his husband is called Jurgen.

== Electoral history ==
Electoral history of Raoul Boucke
Year	Body	Party	Pos.	Votes	Result		Ref.
Year	Body	Party	Pos.	Votes	Party seats	Individual	Ref.
2021	House of Representatives	Democrats 66	10	3,518	24	Won	
