= Heart for Freedom =

Heart for Freedom Hart voor Vrijheid
- Chairperson: Peter van den Neste
- Founded: 17 June 2021
- Split from: Free and Social Netherlands
- Ideology: COVID-19 skepticism Antivax
- Colors: Red
- Municipal council of Kerkrade: 1 / 29

Website
- hartvoorvrijheid.nl

Heart for Freedom (Dutch: Hart voor Vrijheid, pronounced [ˈɦɑrt foːr ˈvrɛiɦɛit]), formerly known as List30 (Lijst30), is a political party in the Netherlands. The party was founded on 17 June 2021 and emerged from the blank list 30 during the 2021 House of Representatives elections when it split from Free and Social Netherlands. The party mainly profiled itself through its criticism of Dutch COVID-19 policy.

== History ==
=== Foundation ===
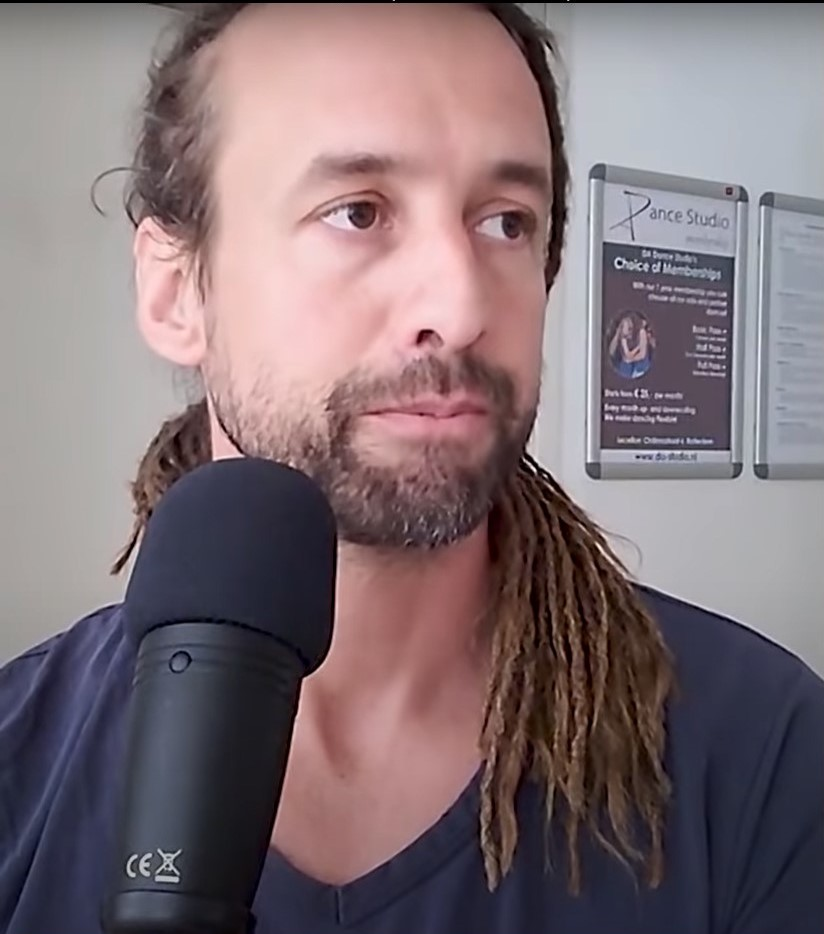
Willem Engel

The party emerged from a split of the political party Free and Social Netherlands (VSN), founded in September 2020. The split arose after Anna Zeven was deregistered from the Chamber of Commerce by party leader Bas Filippini. By her own admission, Zeven was not informed of this, which later turned out not to be true.

Filippini, initiator of VSN, ultimately did not agree with the candidacy of conspiracy thinker Willem Engel proposed by Zeven in the House of Representatives elections of 17 March 2021 and announced on 17 January 2021 that Engel was no longer on the electoral list. This led to an internal conflict. After Filippini had arranged the deregistration with the Chamber of Commerce, he also deregistered Zeven from the Electoral Council, where she was, in her opinion, registered as a deputy representative and submitter. The Electoral Council agreed with her view and as a result, the majority of the declarations of support and the declarations of agreement were regarded as not submitted by VSN but by the new, blank list number 30 of Anna Zeven.

Despite an appeal to the Council of State, the two lists were not merged. The blank list was published in the Staatscourant as 'Lijst 30', without party name. The movement then chose the name Lijst30 as the party name and used it in combination with the hashtag #hartvoorvrijheid.

On 9 March 2021, the preliminary relief judge ruled in favor of VSN after summary proceedings. The VSN statutes showed that the members' meeting could not have been held due to the missing party council. As a result, the current interim board of VSN (consisting of Filippini, Carina Braams and Henk Diepbrink) had the decisive and leading vote, the judgment ruled. The seceded members were ordered to hand over all social media channels.

The formal establishment of the Heart for Freedom party took place on 17 June 2021.

=== Elections ===
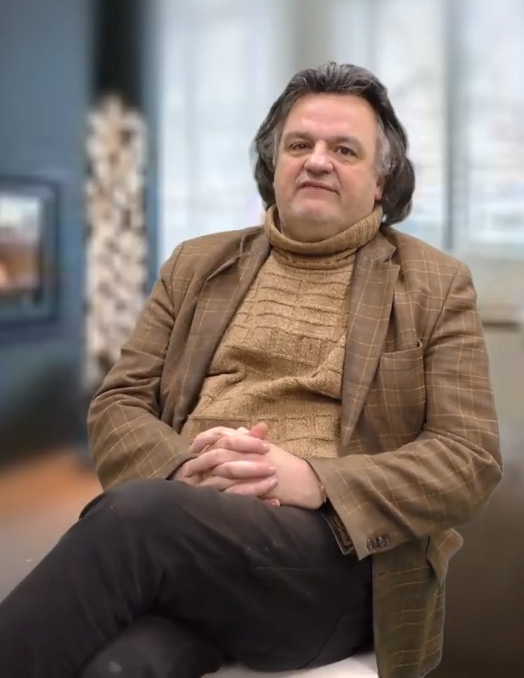
Ab Gietelink

Heart for Freedom participated in the House of Representatives elections of 17 March 2021. The electoral list contained 21 candidates, including Anna Zeven as lead candidate, Willem Engel and Ab Gietelink. The party program did not state a position on Dutch COVID-19 policy, although Engel, frontman of COVID-19 skeptic movement Viruswaarheid, clearly seemed to be of the opinion that all COVID-19 measures should be stopped immediately.

Candidates on the list Theo Vos, Christian Kromme and Felix Tangelder indicated that they did not want to be part of Heart for Freedom, but of the Free and Social Netherlands party.

In the elections, the party received 8,277 votes (0.08%). The best result was achieved in the municipality of Landsmeer (52 votes, 0.69%). After the disappointing results, Engel reported election fraud, but this claim was dismissed by the Public Prosecution Service.

In March 2022, Heart for Freedom participated in the municipal elections in Alkmaar (0.85%), Amsterdam (0.74%), Den Helder (0.8%), Kerkrade (3.4%, one seat), Nederweert (3.06%), Tilburg (0.74%) and Tynaarlo (2.71%). In March 2023, the party participated in the provincial elections in Limburg, receiving 0.05% of the votes.

== Election results ==
=== House of Representatives elections ===
Election year	House of Representatives			
Election year	# of overall votes	% of overall vote	# of overall seats won	+/–
2021	8,277	0.08%	0 / 150	Steady

=== Provincial elections ===
Election year	States-Provincial			
Election year	# of overall votes	% of overall vote	# of overall seats won	+/–
2023	228	0.0%	0 / 566	Steady

=== Municipal elections ===
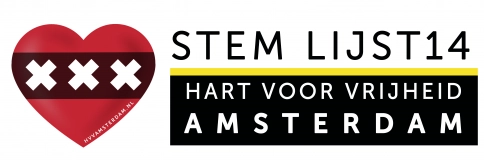
Advertisement used during the Amsterdam municipal elections

Election year	Municipal council				
Election year	Municipality	Votes	%	# of overall seats won	+/−
2022
2022	Alkmaar	391	0.85%	0 / 39	Steady
2022	Amsterdam	2,399	0.74%	0 / 45	Steady
2022	Den Helder	161	0.8%	0 / 31	Steady
2022	Kerkrade	559	3.4%	1 / 29	New
2022	Nederweert	238	3.06%	0 / 17	Steady
2022	Tilburg	538	0.74%	0 / 45	Steady
2022	Tynaarlo	447	2.71%	0 / 23	Steady
