= Willem Engel =

Dutch activist

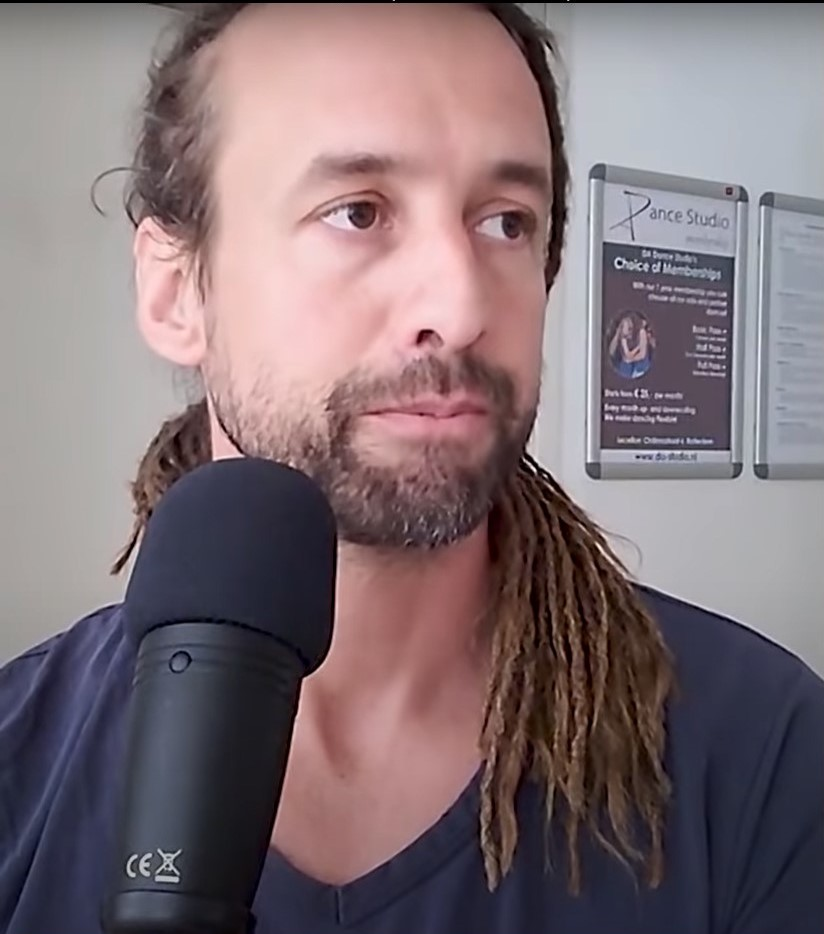
Willem Engel (2020)

Willem Christiaan Engel (born 15 March 1977) is a Dutch activist who founded the controversial organization Viruswaanzin (loosely translated: Virus Madness), and leads it under its new name Viruswaarheid (loosely translated: Virus Truth). The organization regularly protests against governmental measures on COVID-19 and also often promotes alternative theories (about COVID-19). He for example believes that reported cases and risks of the COVID-19 pandemic in the Netherlands have been exaggerated, and the theory that measures against the spread of the SARS-CoV-2 are used to restrict fundamental rights. He is also against vaccination against COVID-19 and believes the SARS‑CoV‑2 escaped from a lab in Wuhan. In March 2022, Engel was arrested for incitement after nearly 23.000 people had pressed charges of inciting violence, spreading medical misinformation, fraud, making statements with terrorist intent, and threats. While released under the restriction of no social media interaction at 30 March, at 3 April he was arrested again because he breached the terms of his release.

On 20 January 2023 he was convicted of inciting breaking the law (he urged people to attend a forbidden demonstration). His sentence was one month imprisonment, with deduction of time served. The sentence is probationary for 2 years and suspended.

== Biography ==
Engel was born on 15 March 1977 and grew up in a large family. He is the son of a real estate mogul. He studied biopharmacy and started his doctoral studies, but he never finished his PhD degree. In 2008 he left the field and started a dance academy where he is a dance teacher teaching Brazilian zouk.

== Politics ==
=== Viruswaanzin/Viruswaarheid ===
In May 2020, after his dance school business had to close because of the COVID-19 pandemic, he founded the organization Viruswaanzin ("virus madness"), which was later renamed to Viruswaarheid ("virus truth").

Engel's organization claims that corruption in the government has ruined some people, and that the number of deaths from COVID-19 is comparable to a normal flu season. In early 2021 he started a court case against the curfew that had been instated by the Dutch government, and the court ruled that there was insufficient legal basis for the imposed curfew. The Dutch government appealed and with a sped-up procedure passed a law that provided the legal ground for the measure. The measure was accepted by the House of Representatives on 18 February 2021 and by the Senate on the next day, the same day the appeal was handled by a higher court (which nullified the lower court's judgment).

The organization makes personal attacks against politicians and virologists. In January 2021 Michaël Verstraeten, public spokesman of the organization, called for re-introducing the death penalty to punish virologists; one year later, in January 2022, Engel shared the home address of Sigrid Kaag, leader of the Dutch Democrats 66 party and finance minister, on Twitter. Kaag reported this to the Dutch police and Engel's Twitter account was temporarily suspended.

=== Vrij en Sociaal Nederland ===
In January 2021 Engel joined Vrij en Sociaal Nederland, a new political party that looked to get seats in the House of Representatives during the 2021 Dutch general election. He was placed third on the party list. His placement on the list, however, caused a split in the party, which resulted in the formation of Lijst30, better known as Heart for Freedom.

=== 2022 Ukraine invasion ===
Right after the 2022 Russian invasion of Ukraine, Willem Engel gave an interview in which he stated he understood the geopolitical reasoning behind Russia's invasion of Ukraine. He filed a lawsuit against the Dutch government for supplying weapons to Ukraine.
