= Together for the Netherlands =

Together for the Netherlands Samen voor Nederland
- Abbreviation: SvN
- Founded: 22 November 2022; 3 years ago
- Headquarters: Lichtenvoorde, Netherlands
- Ideology: Right-wing populism Nationalism Euroscepticism
- Political position: Right-wing
- Colors: Blue; White; Red
- Slogan: Make Holland Great Again

Website
- samen-voor-nederland.nl

Together for the Netherlands (Dutch: Samen voor Nederland, pronounced [ˈsaːmə(ɱ) voːr ˈneːdərlɑnt]; SvN) is a right-wing populist political party in the Netherlands.

== Background ==
The organization was founded in 2022 by Michel Reijinga, amid political activism throughout the Netherlands. The precursor of the party was the protest movement Nederland in Verzet (English: Netherlands in Resistance) led by Reijinga, which during the COVID-19 pandemic organized demonstrations on the Museumplein in Amsterdam against the Dutch government's response to the pandemic. In one of these demonstrations four police officers were hurt by rioters, and thirty demonstrators were arrested. Another demonstration, planned for November in Amsterdam, was canceled by the organization (which had invited conspiracy theorist David Icke) after Amsterdam mayor Femke Halsema refused to let the organization hold its event on Dam Square. It also participated in the ongoing, largely concurrent farmers' protests against government legislation to combat the nitrogen crisis in the Netherlands.

== Political activity ==
Reijinga announced his political ambitions in March 2023, with the goal of participating in the 2025 elections which were brought forward after the fall of the fourth Rutte cabinet. He was the party's lead candidate for the 2023 elections. The party would eventually obtain 5,318 votes, not enough for a seat. A notable person on the party's candidate list for these elections was controversial University of Amsterdam sociologist Laurens Buijs, who, however, left the party several weeks before the elections due to expressed criticism of far-right party Forum for Democracy.

== Election results ==
=== House of Representatives ===
Election	Lijsttrekker	Votes	%	Seats	+/–	Government
2023	Michel Reijinga	5,325	0.05 (#22)	0 / 150	New	Extra-parliamentary

== See also ==
- List of political parties in the Netherlands
- COVID-19 protests in the Netherlands
- Dutch farmers' protests
