= Ubuntu Connected Front =

Dutch political party

- Abbreviation: UCF
- Leader: Regillio Vaarnold
- Founded: 14 December 2017; 8 years ago
- Headquarters: Etta Palmstraat 23, Hoofddorp
- Ideology: Ubuntu; Black-Dutch interests
- Colours: Pan-African colours
- Senate: 0 / 75
- House of Representatives: 0 / 150
- European Parliament: 0 / 29

Website
- ubuntuconnectedfront.com

Ubuntu Connected Front (UCF) was a political party in the Netherlands.

== Ideology and policies ==
Central to UCF's election manifesto is the "Black Agenda", derived from the UN International Decade for People of African Descent 2015 to 2024 mission. The three pillars of this agenda are recognition, justice and development. Recognition concerns the impact of the slavery past. Justice is about historical reparatory justice. The aim is to achieve equal development opportunities for everyone. UCF carries out its activities based on these principles, with the aim of transforming society in this sense.

== Elections ==
The party was founded in December 2017. The first participation in the elections for the UCF was in the municipal elections in 2018. UCF participated in Rotterdam (535 votes, 0.23%) and Amsterdam (1,052 votes, 0.30%). This was insufficient in both cities to win a seat.

The party participated in the 2021 general election with Regillio Vaarnold as its top candidate. The party did not receive enough votes to win a seat in the House of Representatives, but was the most popular party in St. Eustatius, receiving 320 out of 630 votes cast. The UCF candidate list included two prominent politicians from St. Eustatius.

== Action points ==
After the 2021 elections, the UCF carried out several concrete actions in the field of decolonization of cultural heritage. For example, the municipality of Tilburg was urgently requested to remove the statue of Petrus Donders from public space. The government of St. Eustatius was requested to apply heritage participation and to stop the degrading archaeological excavations at the airport. The party is also committed to the (free) change of slave names, something that more and more Dutch municipalities are inclined to do.
