= NLBeter =

Dutch political party

- Leader: Esther van Fenema
- Chairperson: Esther van Fenema
- Founded: 8 November 2019
- Ideology: Healthcare reform

Website
- nlbeter.nl

NLBeter (lit. 'Netherlands Better' or 'Netherlands Recovered') was a minor political party in the Netherlands. Founded in November 2019, it primarily advocated for healthcare reform.

== History ==
NLBeter was founded in November 2019 by a number of healthcare professionals, who sought to improve the Dutch healthcare system.

The party announced its intention to participate in the 2021 Dutch general election, which took place on 17 March. Psychiatrist Esther van Fenema was chosen as the party's lead candidate. The party got a total of 8,657 votes, which wasn't enough to grant the party a seat in the House of Representatives.
