= Party for the Republic =

Party for the Republic Partij voor de Republiek
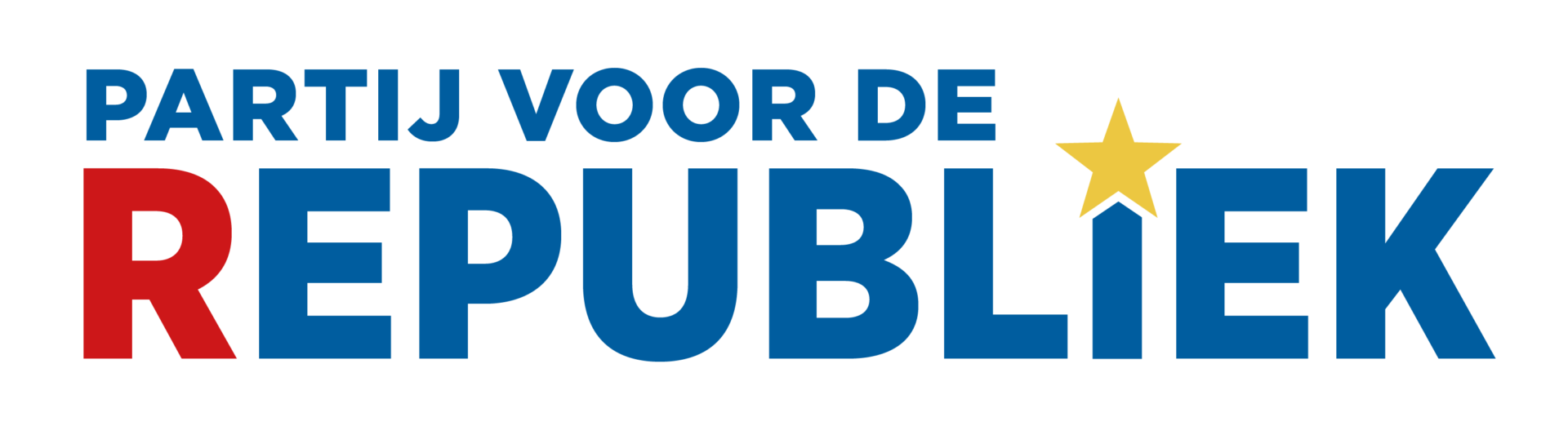
- Abbreviation: PvdR
- Leader: Bruno Braakhuis
- Chairperson: René Zwaap
- Founder: René Zwaap; Manuel Kneepkens; Lodewijk Brunt
- Founded: December 2020; 4 years ago
- Headquarters: Amsterdam, Netherlands
- Ideology: Republicanism; European federalism Direct democracy
- Colors: Blue and red
- House of Representatives: 0 / 150

Website
- republiek.eu

Party for the Republic (Dutch: Partij voor de Republiek, pronounced [pɑrˈtɛi voːr də reːpyˈblik]; PvdR) is a republican political party in the Netherlands. The party took part in the 2021 House of Representatives elections in two electoral districts; they did not win a seat in the election.

== History ==
The Party for the Republic was founded in 2020 by lawyer and Rotterdam politician Manuel Kneepkens, emeritus professor of urban sociology Lodewijk Brunt, media entrepreneur Teun Gautier and journalist René Zwaap. That year, on Prinsjesdag, the party presented its draft party program Tien over Oranje, a 10-step plan to transform the Dutch monarchy into a modern republic. For the party, the abolition of the monarchy is not an end in itself. The party wants to transform the European Union into a European Republic with a lot of autonomy for the member republics. The party ultimately wants to become a transnational European party.

The party took part in the 2021 House of Representatives elections in two electoral districts with party leader Bruno Braakhuis and obtained a total of 255 votes, insufficient for a seat.

== Ideology ==
The party program for the House of Representatives elections of 2021 listed several key points, such as the abolition of the King of the Netherlands as head of state, the implementation of an elected president following the Swiss model, and strengthening of direct democracy. With regard to the Europe, the party wanted to establish a European republic, and abolish the Council of Europe and introduce a transnational democratic system with a European constitution.

== Election results ==
=== House of Representatives ===
Election year	List	# of overall votes	% of overall vote	# of overall seats won	+/–
2021	List	255	0.02%	0 / 150	Steady

== See also ==
- Criticism of monarchy
- Republicanism in the Netherlands
