= Bruno Braakhuis =

Dutch politician (born 1961)

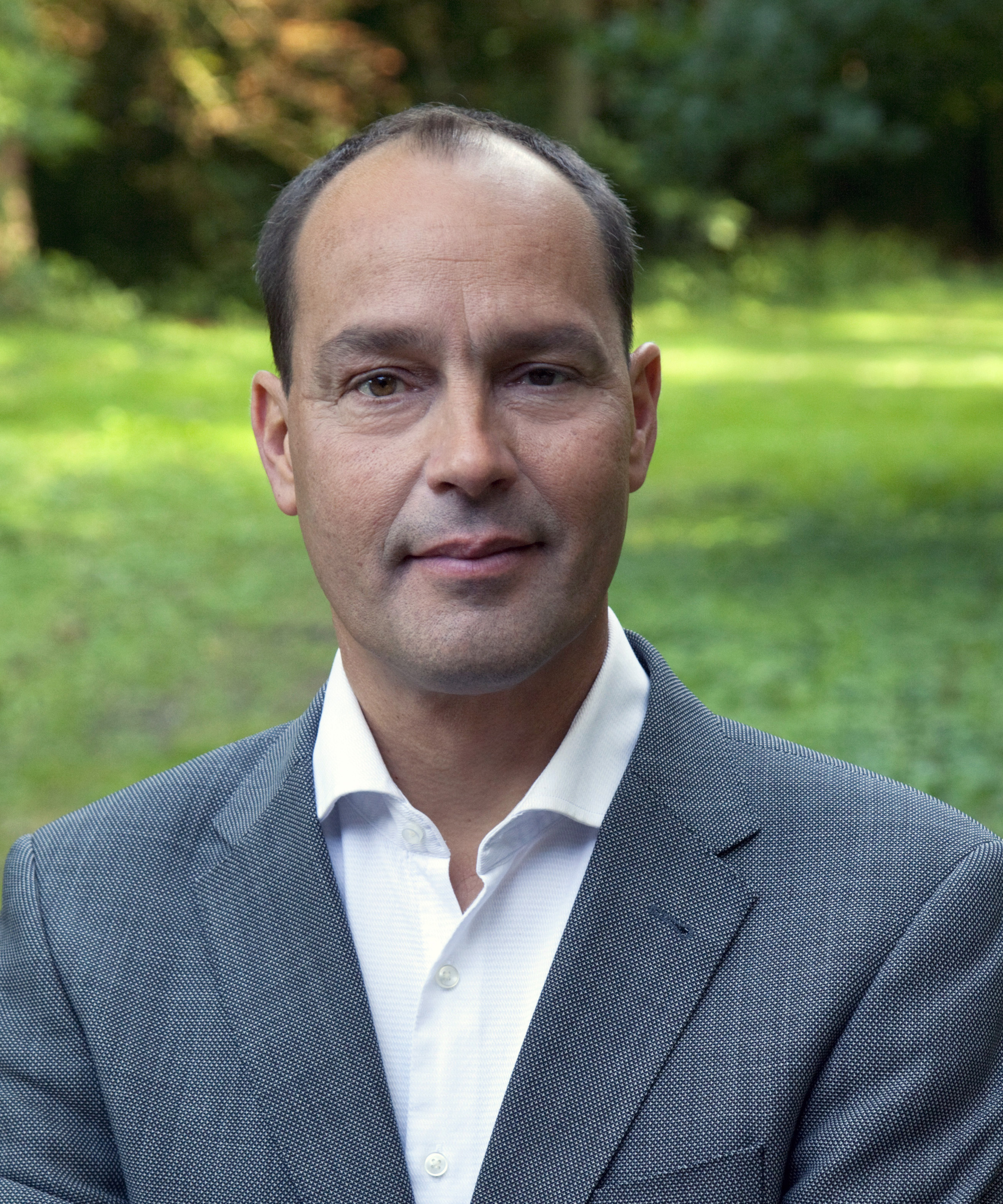
Bruno Braakhuis

Bruno Adrianus Maria Braakhuis (born 10 July 1961 in Haarlem) is a former Dutch politician and marketing as well as communication manager. As a member of GreenLeft (GroenLinks), he was an MP from 17 June 2010 to 19 September 2012. He focused on matters of economic affairs, science, innovation and the European Union. After his membership in the House of Representatives, he became a member of the Party for the Animals (PvdD).

In the parliamentary elections in 2021, Braakhuis is the lijstrekker of the Party for the Republic, which has submitted a list of candidates in two electoral districts (Leeuwarden and Amsterdam)

Braakhuis studied industrial design at The Hague University of Applied Science and obtained an MBA from London's Kingston University.
