= COVID-19 protests in the Netherlands =

Protests against COVID-19 lockdowns and restrictions

- Part of the protests against responses to the COVID-19 pandemic
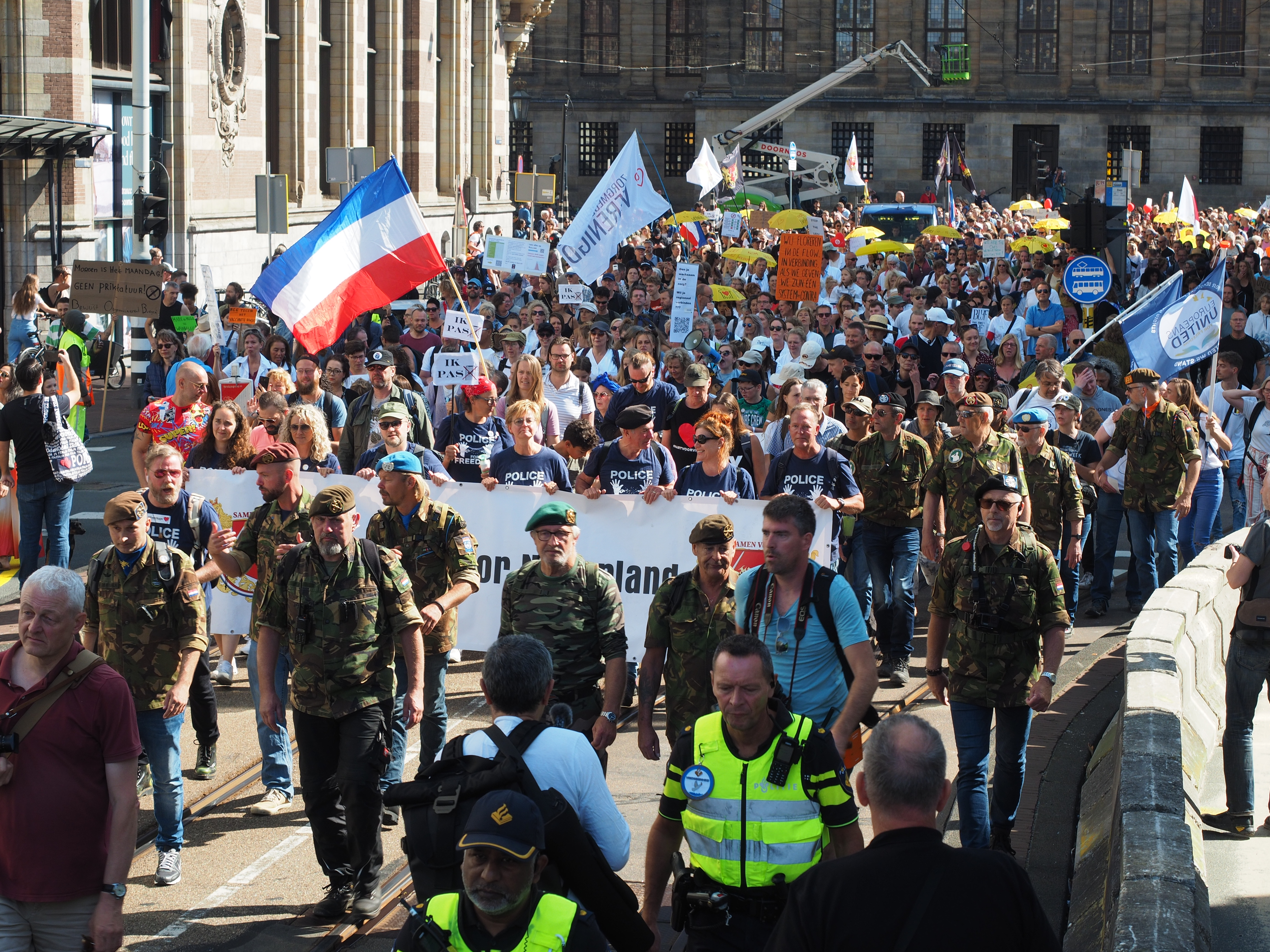
- Protesters in Amsterdam on 5 September 2021
- Date: 17 January 2021 — 17 September 2022 (1 year and 8 months)
- Location: Netherlands
- Caused by: Dissatisfaction with COVID-19 vaccination policy and societal restrictions; Extensive dissimination of anti-government and COVID-19 misinformation through alternative media outlets; Calls to demonstrate and riot on social media
- Methods: Demonstrations; Flag desecration; Internet activism; Intimidation; Rioting; Vandalism

Parties
Anti-government and anti-lockdown protesters; Nederland in Verzet; Samen voor Nederland; Rioters; Youths; Football hooligans; Right-wing extremists; COVID-19 conspiracy theorists	(Netherlands) Third Rutte cabinet; Minister of Health Hugo de Jonge; (Netherlands) Fourth Rutte cabinet; Minister of Health Ernst Kuipers; Law enforcement; National Police Corps; Royal Marechaussee; Local vigilantes; Football supporters; Farmers

Casualties
- Injuries: At least 12 (as of 27 Jan 2021); 23/11/2021; 13 (3 serious)
- Arrested: 575+ (as of 27 Jan 2021); 23/11/2021; 173

Protests against COVID-19 in the Netherlands (Dutch: coronaprotesten) were a series of protests and riots in the Netherlands against the government COVID-19 prevention measures, which were in force between 27 January 2020 and 20 May 2022, with travel restrictions lifted on 17 September 2022. The protests came to a head with the 2021 Dutch curfew riots (Dutch: avondklokrellen) in response to a nationwide night-time curfew between 23 January and 28 April 2021. Since the end of the COVID-19 pandemic in the Netherlands, a number of anti-lockdown protest groups and individual protesters have shifted their attention to the ongoing, largely concurrent Dutch farmers' protests against government legislation to limit agricultural pollution by downsizing livestock production.

== Background ==
The proposal to introduce a nationwide curfew to curb the spread of the coronavirus disease 2019 (COVID-19) had been put on the table by the Outbreak Management Team (OMT) as early as September 2020, but did not gain the support of the House of Representatives at the time, because of its strong association with World War II.

Four months later, however, the measure was deemed necessary as the number of infections was not declining fast enough, despite the fact that the Netherlands had been in a full lockdown since 14 December 2020. Furthermore, the more transmissible B.1.1.7 variant of the virus continued to spread across the country, raising concerns for a potential "third wave" of infections.

Demissionary Prime Minister Mark Rutte announced his plan to introduce a 20:30–4:30 curfew at a press conference on 20 January 2021. On 21 January, a majority in the House of Representatives voted to support the proposal, after a motion to postpone the curfew to 21:00 had been adopted. The curfew would be in effect from 23 January to at least 10 February 2021.

Non-violent protests against the government's COVID-19 prevention measures had taken place on several occasions prior to the announcement of the curfew. However, on 24 January 2021, illegal demonstrations against the curfew in Amsterdam and Eindhoven escalated into violent riots in response to police interventions. Calls to riot were subsequently spread on social media, leading to riots in other places as well. The next major waves of violent protests in 2021 took place in The Hague in mid-March and in Rotterdam in mid-November. In early 2022, a new wave of violence hit Amsterdam when police used police dogs, injuring several anti-lockdown opponents who clashed with police. Pictures of a police dog biting one of the protesters by the left arm while a police officer tries to restrain it have traveled the world via video and social networks, with strong public condemnation for excessive use of force against public gatherings.

== Timeline ==
Places in the Netherlands where rioters clashed with the police, as of 26 January 2021

=== 2021 ===
==== Riots 23–26 January ====
During the first night of the curfew, the police issued 3,600 fines for being outside after 21:00 without a valid reason. Anti-lockdown protesters and conspiracy theorists gathered in Amersfoort, Rotterdam, IJmuiden and Stein to demonstrate.

On Urk, a former island in the province of Flevoland, groups of youths began to riot in protest against the curfew. The rioters vandalised police cars, and threw stones and fireworks to police officers. Later that evening, a COVID-19 testing site of the Municipal Health Service (GGD) was set on fire. Two suspects have subsequently been arrested.

On 24 January in the afternoon, hundreds of protesters gathered on Museumplein in Amsterdam, despite the fact that Mayor Femke Halsema, the chief police officer and the chief public prosecutor had prohibited the demonstration. The police used water cannons and police dogs to disperse the crowd, in response to which the protesters began throwing firework bombs towards police officers.

Similarly, in Eindhoven, rioters – who had come to the city centre to protest against the lockdown measures – attacked the police by throwing stones, golf balls, fireworks and knives. They also set vehicles on fire and looted a supermarket in the city's central station. According to ProRail, hundreds of thousands of euros in damage was inflicted to the railway station.

In the evening, riots also took place in Enschede, Helmond, Roermond, The Hague, Tilburg and Venlo. In Enschede, rioters attempted to break the windows of the local hospital, Medisch Spectrum Twente. More than 300 people were arrested.

150 people were arrested during the night from 25 to 26 January in Amsterdam and Rotterdam. Shops were looted and vandalized. The cities of Den Bosch, Zwolle, Amersfoort, Alkmaar, Hoorn, Gouda, Haarlem, and Veenendaal experienced troubles, including cars being burned and police attacked with stones.

Den Bosch, Sittard-Geleen, Stein and Capelle aan den IJssel issued an emergency decree for the upcoming night. Beek and Echt-Susteren will have an emergency decree until the 10th of February, which will allow the police to do stop-and-frisk without reason. Zwolle declared an emergency order, which is one step below an emergency decree in Dutch law. Dutch police designated Den Bosch, Almelo en Haarlem as potential hotspots. The Ikazia Hospital in Rotterdam also advised its patients not to come during the evening hours, as police designated the nearby Zuidplein as a potential hotspot.

The riots that took place on 26 January were less heavy than the previous days. Despite some small riots in Amsterdam, Rotterdam and Hilversum, and some disturbances in The Hague, Schijndel and Julianadorp, the situation in these six cities and villages was under control within about an hour.

Many cities also saw massive support coming from their locals. Cities such as Maastricht, saw its hardcore fanbase of its local football club, the angel side, gather as a reaction to the threats made by supposed rioters. A couple hundred supporters marched through the city, eventually making their way to the city centre to make a statement: "we will not tolerate destruction and looting". Most of them went home around 21.00 to adhere to the curfew rules.

==== From 26 January to 14 March ====
On 27 January, there were no major riots, only small disturbances in The Hague and Rotterdam. In Rotterdam a theatre was set on fire.

Apart from a relatively large group of youths who were shooting fireworks in Tiel, there were no more riots or disturbances reported throughout the Netherlands as of 28 January.

On 31 January, protests against the curfew were held in Amsterdam and Apeldoorn. There were no major riots, but dozens of people were arrested after the police had ended the demonstrations.

==== Riots in Rotterdam 19–21 November ====
In November 2021, the government proposed implementing the "2G rule", a measure to only allow individuals who are vaccinated (gevaccineerd) or have recovered from a COVID-19 infection (genezen) from being able to enter hotels, restaurants, cafes, cultural and artistic places, and events, and to use non-essential services. On November 19, a protest against the 2G rule was announced on social media, which turned into a riot. The police shot several people.

Most notably, riots occurred in Rotterdam, where 51 people were arrested. There were also riots in Stein, Roermond, Urk, The Hague, Enschede, Leeuwarden and Tilburg. The authorities used water cannons, police dogs and mounted police against the rioters. Three rioters were seriously injured when police opened fire on them, while a fourth suffered minor injuries. Additionally, four rioters and five police officers sustained minor injuries during the unrest. Peaceful protests also took place in Amsterdam and Breda.

=== 2022 ===
==== Riots in Amsterdam on 2 January ====
On January 2, 2022, the intervention police with batons and shields tried to break up the crowd of several thousand that gathered on Sunday in the Dutch capital to protest against the measures of closure and vaccination of COVID-19.

Videos on social media showed one man try and escape a police dog biting his hand and in other clips showed chaos unfold as crowds ran around the city.

==== The end of the protests and the lifting of the COVID-19 measures ====
From March 23, 2022, EU citizens can enter the country without any restrictions. Anyone with regular residence in the Netherlands can also travel without restrictions, which includes the cultural exchange program. Masks are optional. On September 17, all Covid measures were lifted.

== Reactions ==
Demissionary Prime Minister, Mark Rutte, told reporters that the recent events "have nothing to do with protests, this is criminal violence and we will treat it as such".

Minister of Finance Wopke Hoekstra said that the riots will not make the government "capitulate to a few idiots". Minister of Justice and Security Ferdinand Grapperhaus said the same. "Apparently small groups find it necessary to riot. But that is not because of the corona policy, because you don't have to loot a shop for that", he said. Grapperhaus added that the police and Koninklijke Marechaussee are cracking down on the rioters. They will be subject to summary judgment and can face unconditional prison sentences.

MPs Geert Wilders and Jesse Klaver, of the Party for Freedom and GroenLinks respectively, accused each other of inciting the riots. Jesse Klaver accused Geert Wilders of inciting the people to riot, while Geert Wilders demanded Jesse Klaver to remove his party's rank and file from the Schilderswijk, a neighbourhood where the riots happened.

The mayor of Eindhoven John Jorritsma gave a statement that: "If we continue down this way, we will head to civil war."

The mayor of Rotterdam Ahmed Aboutaleb released a video in which he directly addressed the rioters. He asked if they felt proud to have destroyed their own hometown and promising them police will crack down on them. He went on to applaud the real heroes of the city's history, that rebuilt the city after the Rotterdam Blitz instead of destroying it. To the entrepreneurs whose establishments were damaged he promised to work together with insurance companies to support them.

A spokesperson of the Dutch armed forces stated that the Royal Netherlands Army has not yet been asked to help curb the riots. However, if the armed forces are asked to help "it would be limited to logistical and material support". Geert Wilders submitted a law proposal enabling the army to assist law enforcement, however, the proposal failed to receive any support aside from his own party, the PVV.

== See also ==
- List of protests in the 21st century
- Protests against responses to the COVID-19 pandemic
- COVID-19 pandemic in the Netherlands
- 2021 Dutch curfew riots
- Dutch farmers' protests (since 2019), concurrent protests against Dutch government legislation to limit human impact on the nitrogen cycle
