= Dutch government response to the COVID-19 pandemic =

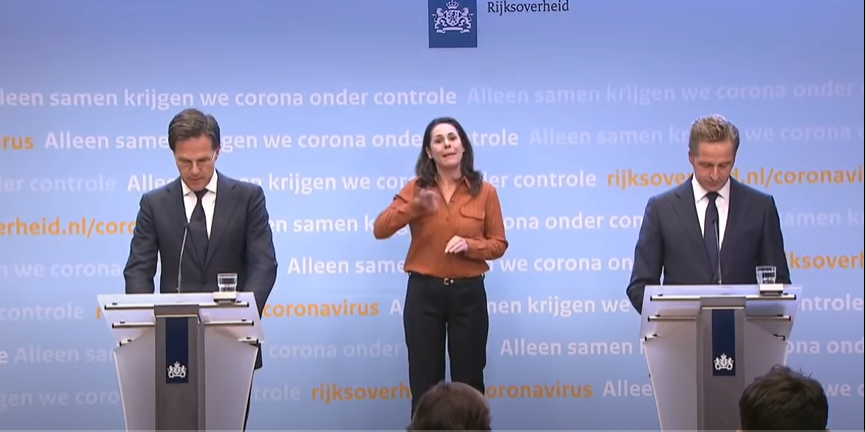

During the COVID-19 pandemic in the Netherlands, various measures were taken by the government. On the advice of the Outbreak Management Team (OMT) set up by the National Institute for Public Health and the Environment (RIVM), many successive decisions were taken in a short period of time. The first preventive measures came into effect on Monday, January 27, 2020.

== Preventive measures ==
On Monday, January 27, 2020, Minister Bruno Bruins of health care announced that COVID-19, the disease caused by SARS-CoV-2, is classified as a disease. This means that residents of the Netherlands are obliged to report if they suspect they are infected with the virus, or if others suspect that they are infected with the virus. The minister was also able to intervene quickly and take decisions thanks to extra ministerial powers.

Experts from the OMT did not consider screening at Schiphol Airport or handing out masks to be useful. Since Schiphol Airport had no direct connections with Wuhan, no measures were taken there. Good hygiene and keeping a distance from sick people were considered sufficient. However, the airport was provided with signs with information about the disease. RIVM and Erasmus MC made tests available to determine whether someone is infected with SARS-CoV-2.

=== Regulation 2019-nCoV ===
With the 2019-nCoV Regulation of the minister for health care of 28 January, the virus and the virus infection that causes it were classified as infectious disease belonging to group A, referred to in Article 1, part e, of the law public health. With this, all provisions of this law for infectious diseases belonging to group A also came into effect for this disease.

Because the virus is marked as a disease, the notification requirement is activated. If a doctor in the Netherlands suspects or establishes the coronavirus in a person examined by him, he must immediately report this to the GGD. The GGD will immediately report this to the RIVM.

It also makes it possible to apply the control measures included in the Public Health Act, such as the isolation of (presumably) infected persons.

Finally, this means that the Minister for Medical Care will be responsible for directing the fight against this disease. This means that the minister determines the measures to combat it.

== Measures by date of announcement ==
Until 1 December 2020, new versions of emergency regulation were always in force for mandatory measures per security region. Since then, there have been national schemes based on the "Temporary Covid-19 Measures Act"
