= Helma Lodders =

Dutch politician

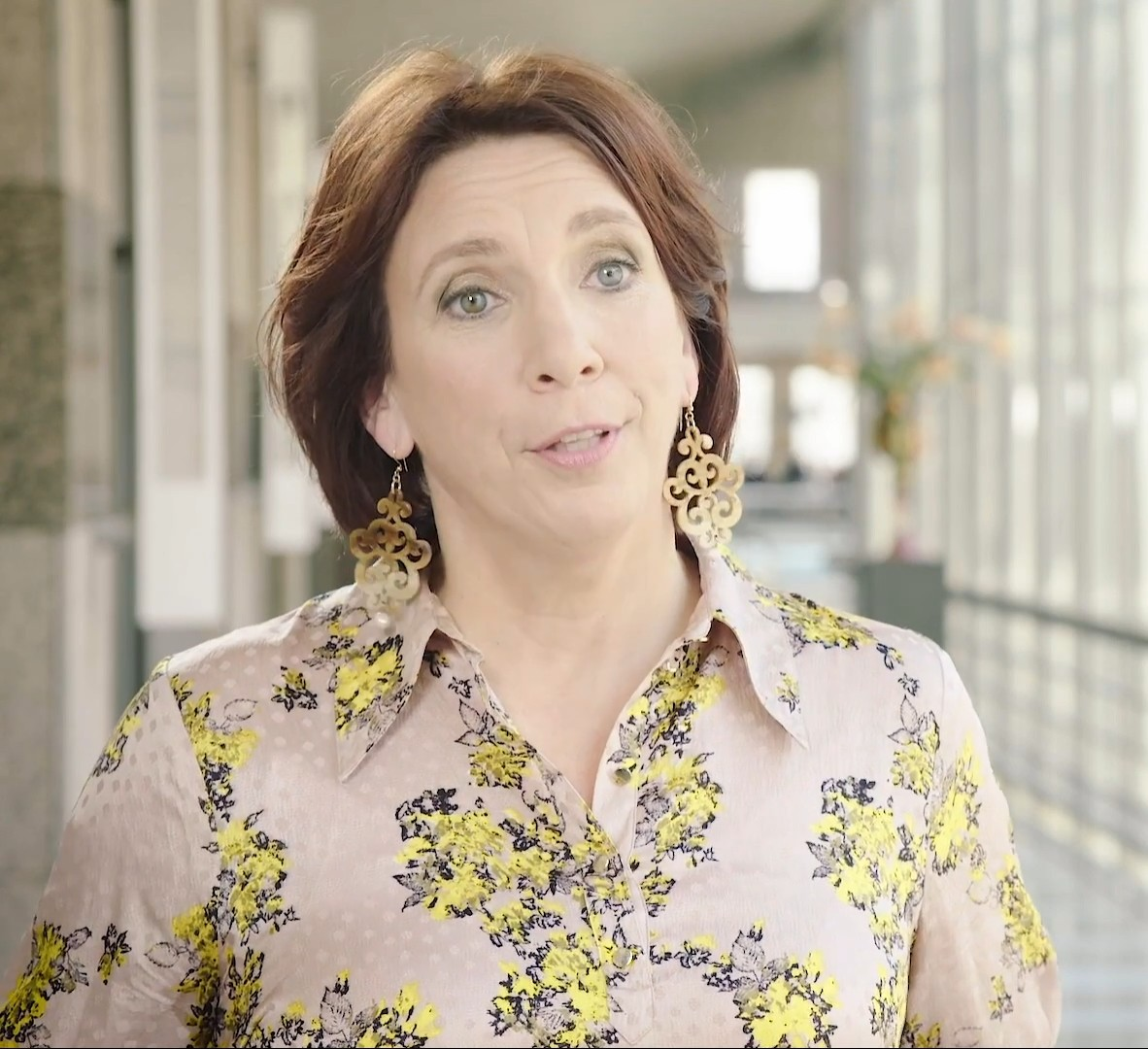

Member of the House of Representatives
- In office 17 June 2010 – 31 March 2021

Personal details
- Born: Wilhelmina Jenneke Helena Lodders; 21 June 1968 (age 58) Klundert, Netherlands
- Party: BBB (since 2025)
- Other party: VVD (until 2025)
- Awards: Order of Orange-Nassau (2021)

Wilhelmina Jenneke Helena "Helma" Lodders (born 21 June 1968) is a Dutch politician. As a member of the People's Party for Freedom and Democracy (Volkspartij voor Vrijheid en Democratie) she has been an MP from 17 June 2010 until 31 March 2021. She focuses on matters of nature, labour markets, healthcare science education and casualties of war.

She was a member of the municipal council of Zeewolde from 1998 to 2002 and an alderwoman from the same municipality from 2002 to 2008.

== Decorations ==
Honours
Ribbon bar	Honour	Country	Date	Comment
	Knight of the Order of Orange-Nassau	Netherlands	30 March 2021	
