= A12 blockade =

Series of climate protests in The Hague, Netherlands

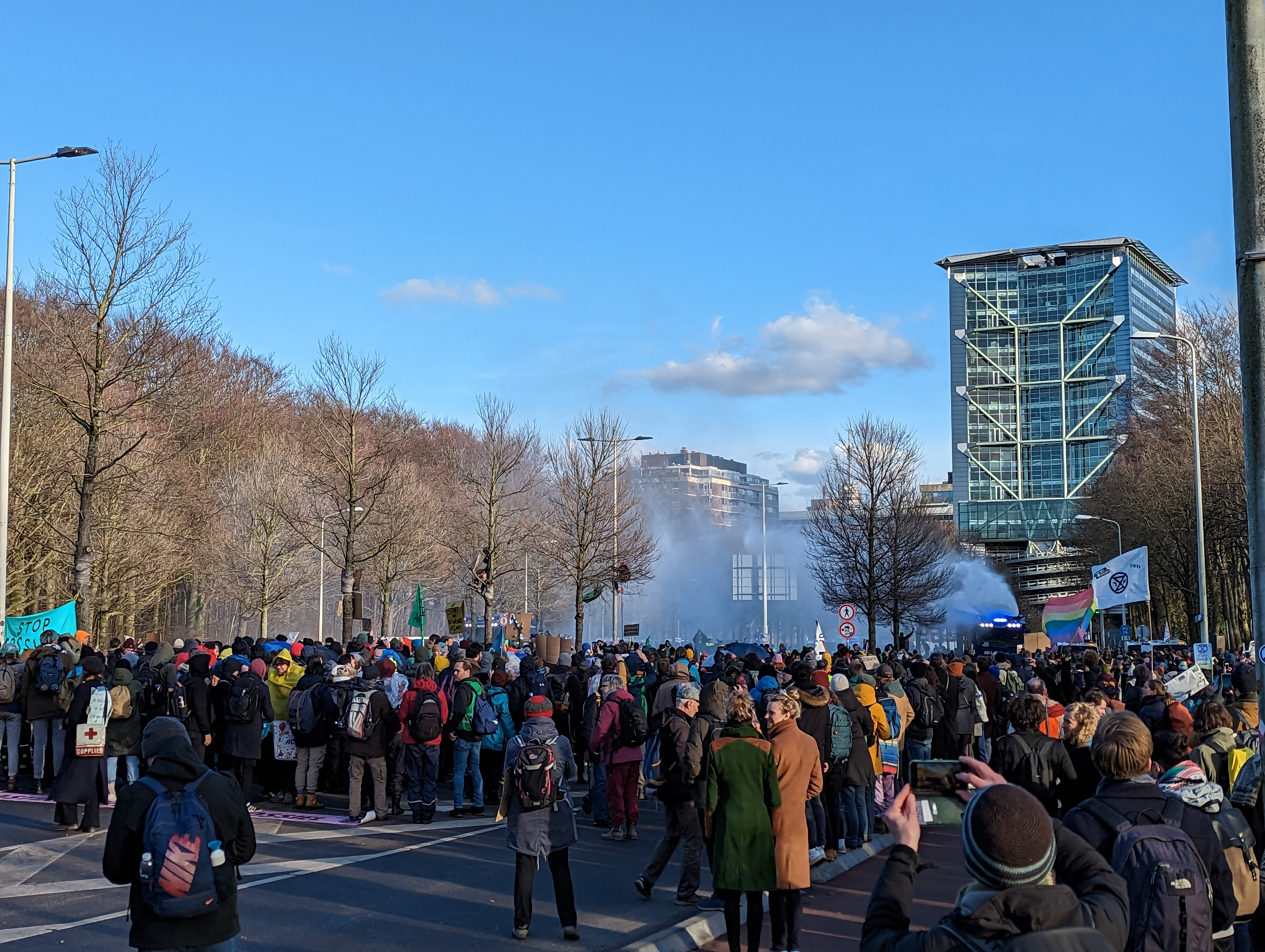
- A12 blockade 11 March 2023
- Date: 2022-2025
- Location: The Hague; 52.0839°N 4.3267°E
- Goals: Stop fossil subsidies
- Methods: Civil disobedience

Casualties
- Arrested: More than 15000 (according to Extinction Rebellion)
- Location within South Holland

The A12 blockade is a string of protests by Extinction Rebellion (XR) on the Utrechtsebaan (part of the A12 motorway) in The Hague, irregularly since 6 July 2022 and there were daily blockades from 9 September 2023 until 5 October 2023. The blockades were paused after a motion in the Tweede Kamer passed that called on the government to make a plan to phase out fossil subsidies but taken up again from February 2024. The activists demand that the government end fossil fuel subsidies, which are estimated at between €39.7 and €46.4 billion a year. Thousands of activists have been arrested. Political and social reactions to the blockades have been mixed.

== Background ==
Extinction Rebellion demand an end to fossil subsidies. By this, they mean not only direct subsidies but also indirect subsidies, ranging from tax exemptions to relatively low taxes on energy consumption for big users. The subsidies were calculated at €4.5 billion in 2020 by the government themselves, with the side note that this figure excludes numerous subsidies. In January 2023, Alman Metten (a former MEP for the PvdA) calculated that the fossil subsidies were €17.5 billion in 2019.

On 4 September 2023, environmental organizations estimated the subsidies at €37.5 billion, not long after the Ministry of Economic Affairs and Climate Policy released their own calculations, which evaluated it at between €39.7 and €46.4 billion a year.

== Location ==
The blockades are on the Utrechtsebaan which is designated as part of the A12 but is not considered a motorway. As such, the local authority is responsible for managing it. This location was chosen as it lies between the temporary location of the Tweede Kamer and the Ministry of Economic Affairs and Climate Policy. Often the protesters do not succeed in getting to the location exactly between the two, as the police stops them at the beginning of the Utrechtsebaan.

== Timeline ==
=== 2021 ===
13 October: Protesters attempted to blockade the road, but the police prevented them. Four of them were convicted to 45 hours of community service.

=== 2022 ===
6 July - 1st blockade: Several dozen activists got arrested.

21 September -2nd blockade: Several activists glued themselves on the road and 21 activists got arrested.

15 October - 3rd blockade: 62 activists got arrested.

26 November - 4th blockade: They blocked the road for three hours and 150 activists got arrested.

=== 2023 ===
26 January: Eight activists got arrested for sedition, as they called on people to participate in the blockade. They were also banned from the area where the protest would take place. Civil society groups said these measures were too harsh and said that civil disobedience is a legitimate way of protest.

28 January - 5th blockade: 1000 activists took part in the blockade and another 2000 were there to support the activists, protesting next to the road. 650 protesters got arrested. Because of what happened two days prior, almost 40 civil society organizations supported the blockade.

11 March - 6th blockade: Around 3000 protesters blocked the road with 700 of them being arrested. It was the first day that a water cannon was being used on the activists.

27 May - 7th blockade: Around 7000 activists blocked the road or came in support. The water cannon was used before 1,579 of them got arrested.

20 June: Extinction Rebellion announces a daily blockade from 9 September onwards, if they get arrested they will come back the following day at 12 o'clock until fossil subsidies are ended.

==== September ====
9 September - 8th blockade: 10,000 to 25,000 people showed up, including the supporters. The water cannons were used before the police arrested 2,400 activists.

10 September - 9th blockade: 500 activists got arrested and blocked the road for more than 1.5 hours.

11 September - 10th blockade: The first weekday of the permanent blockade attracted a couple hundred activists, with 210 of whom were arrested. The road was blocked for a little over two hours.

12 September - 11th blockade: A little less than 200 activists got arrested. A driver was also arrested after he attacked a local journalist. The blockade lasted for a little more than one hour.

13 September until 26 September - 12th blockade until 25th blockade: Everyday around a couple hundred activists got arrested with police often using the water cannon before arresting them. The road was blocked for several hours each time.

27 September until 29 September - 26th blockade until 28th blockade: 27 September was the first day that the activists reached their targeted location again, the last time being in January. The police were for the most part not present at the blockade, with only 6 police officers being at the location. Arresting the activists hours after the blockade started. The mayor of The Hague, Jan van Zanen said that police resources were needed elsewhere. The 27th and 28th blockade were also being held with almost no police presence, only several hours later police would show up with immediately arresting the couple of hundred activists that blocked the road. The effect of the police not showing up until several hours after the blockade started, resulted in the blockade lasting hours longer than before.

30 September and 1 October - 29th blockade and 30th blockade: Around a hundred climate activists from the German group Letzte Generation joined the blockade for the weekend. The first day 600 activists were arrested after the water cannon was used on them, the blockade was ended after 2 hours. On 1 October opponents of the blockade showed up, multiple activists were hit by eggs that the opponents threw at them. The police said to the activists that they couldn't guarantee the safety of the activists anymore because of the opponents. Extinction Rebellion asked because of this to not actively resist arrest. The members of Letzte Generation glued themselves with finger locks to manhole covers and drain covers. 6 members of the group also sat and glued themselves on the matrix signs above the road. The blockade lasted for more than 7,5 hours, which is longer than most of the other blockades that took place.

==== October ====
2 October until 10 October -31st blockade until 34th blockade: From 2 October until 5 October there were blockades with activists getting arrested again, with blocking the road for several hours at most. In the evening of 5 October XR announced they would stop the blockades, as a motion to make a plan to phase out fossil fuels would be voted on the next week. The motion got a majority in the Tweede Kamer and therefore passed, XR applauded the result and announced they would stop the blockades on the A12 until at least Christmas.

=== 2024 ===
3 February - 35th blockade: This blockade was announced on January 8th 2024 as a reaction to the Dutch government failing to provide the announced detailed plan to phase out fossil fuels. From several locations in the city, activists walked towards the A12. There were about 1000 arrests.

15 February:

6 April - Blockade attempt: This blockade was announced on February 15th 2024 by XR by blocking the doors of the Ministry of Finance. Several activist groups marched towards the A12 but the blockade was prevented by the police. The activists blocked other roads in the city and there were around 400 arrests. Climate activist Greta Thunberg was also present and arrested twice.

2 July - 36th blockade: A small group of activists blocked the A12 unannounced.

6 July - 37th blockade: Hundreds of activists blocked the A12 and there were around 500 arrests including again Greta Thunberg.

14 September - 38th blockade: Hundreds of activists blocked the A12. At the beginning few police was present due to a strike, but the police removed the activists later in the afternoon and there were around 370 arrests.

4 December - 39th blockade: An unannounced blockade was held one day before the commission meeting about fossil fuels in the Tweede Kamer. 107 activists were arrested.

=== 2025 ===
11 January - 40th blockade: Through several routes activists walked towards the A12. Some groups were stopped by the police and blocked other roads in the city while another group of activists managed to block the A12 in between the temporary location of the Tweede Kamer and the Ministry of Economic Affairs and Climate Policy. More than 700 activists were arrested and the water cannons were used.

15 January - Five activists are prosecuted for allegedly spraying the tunnel wall with chalkspray during the A12 blockades in 2023 and 2024, and one activist for allegedly damaging windows, amongst other allegations related to XR but not to the A12 blockades.

5 April - 41st blockade: More than 500 activists were arrested in the tunnelbox in ending the blockade at 4.30pm. 13 activists were arrested for criminal offenses including obstruction, resisting the police, stopping traffic, and another 27 activists were arrested for being the first to block the road. The other demonstrators were immediately released after arrest and relocation. During the demonstration, a van driver drove into demonstrators. No injuries were reported, and the van driver was not arrested. Heavy traffic jams were caused on the A4 and N14, with a delay of more than half an hour.

6 April - 42nd blockade: This blockade for a second day in a row was unannounced with a group of forty activists. The blockade lasted three hours until all activists were arrested. XR reported an eyewitness account of an activist beaten unconscious by the police, but the police is unaware of such an incident.

25 June - 43rd blockade: XR attempted to block the A12 during the NATO summit, protesting against climate destruction, racism, fascism, genocide, animal cruelty, Trump, and for immigrants. Activists attempted to reach the A12 in five groups moving with different routes. All five groups were stopped although one group reached the Utrechtsebaan/A12. The A12 road was closed in both directions for about an hour and a half. Activists leaving from the Malieveld were told to stop by police before walking into a line of riot and mounted police, whom used batons and violence to stop the activists. Two activists had their arms broken by police and were sent to the hospital. This group of activists were then pushed back to a gas station. Some activists were also separated from the larger group and arrested by plainclothes police (Arrestantengroep). In total, two hundred activists were arrested.

13 September - 44th blockade: Leading up to Budget Day, XR blocked the Utrechtsebaan/A12. 402 activists were arrested, taken to ADO stadium, and released.

28 October - 45th blockade: On 28 October Tuesday, a new blockade is announced, one day before the 2025 Dutch General Elections, calling attention for political action to the same demands to stop fossil subsidies.

== Reactions ==
=== Authorities ===
On 26 January, seven activists were arrested early in the morning, for sedition. They called on others to join them in blocking the A12 on 28 January. Because of the arrests numerous "civil society groups" joined the blockade two days later, to protect the right to protest. Eight activists were charged with the crime. Of these, one was acquitted; five were sentenced to 30 hours of community service; and two to 60 hours of community service as they had already participated in a blockade and also wrote graffiti on the walls next to the road. They were ordered to pay €9000 damages for this. However the court was highly critical of the way that the police handled the case, and did not see it as proportionate to arrest the activists at their homes.

The mayor of The Hague, Jan van Zanen, has banned every blockade and has insisted that the activists could instead protest on the Malieveld, which is located next to the Utrechtsebaan, or at another location in the city. Since 11 March the mayor has on many occasions given the police permission to use water cannon on the peaceful activists.

The police unions have been frustrated that few of the activists have been prosecuted. Most of them are arrested and released soon afterwards, and not charged. The Public Prosecution Service (OM) says that most of the activists are peaceful and that the crime they commit is a minor offence; they also see it as unlikely that a judge would convict them for these offences. The OM have had plans to record the names of the arrestees, and charge them after multiple offences. There has also been frustration within the police and the mayor about the large police presence that is needed to clear the road, which means that police have to be brought to The Hague from around the Netherlands to attend the demonstrations. The police say that this prevents them from carrying out their normal duties, and they are concerned about the effects of this: especially since the daily blockades started. The police unions have called for a dialogue between the government and the demonstrators.

==== Politicians ====
In March 2023 the prime minister, Mark Rutte said that it was their own fault that the water cannon was used on them as they didn't leave the road after being told to do so by the police.

Right wing parties have been critical about the A12 blockade with complaining that the police action against the activists isn't harsh enough and are frustrated with the fact the activists aren't prosecuted. The minister of justice and security has shared the same concerns but supports the police reaction to the blockade and says that the court ruled in early 2023 that blocking a road isn't punishable and within the right of protest. The minister has also said that she will never start a dialogue with the people who are actually blockading the road. The minister of climate and energy policy went to the legal support demonstration on 9 September to have a dialogue with the activists.

=== Public opinion ===
RTL Nieuws conducted an opinion poll a day before the daily blockade would start. 80% of the people who were surveyed were against the blockade and 14% supported it. People aged between 18 and 25 years old were more supportive of the blockade with 27% supporting it. The majority of the people are in favour of the goal of the blockade, with 70% agreeing that the government should stop fossil subsidies.
