= 2021 Dutch general election =

- 15–17 March 2021
- All 150 seats in the House of Representatives; 76 seats needed for a majority
- Turnout: 78.71% (▼3.22 pp)
Party	Leader	Vote %	Seats	+/–
VVD	Mark Rutte	21.87	34	+1
D66	Sigrid Kaag	15.02	24	+5
PVV	Geert Wilders	10.79	17	−3
CDA	Wopke Hoekstra	9.50	15	−4
SP	Lilian Marijnissen	5.98	9	−5
PvdA	Lilianne Ploumen	5.73	9	0
GL	Jesse Klaver	5.16	8	−6
FvD	Thierry Baudet	5.02	8	+6
PvdD	Esther Ouwehand	3.84	6	+1
CU	Gert-Jan Segers	3.37	5	0
Volt	Laurens Dassen	2.42	3	New
JA21	Joost Eerdmans	2.37	3	New
SGP	Kees van der Staaij	2.07	3	0
Denk	Farid Azarkan	2.03	3	0
50+	Liane den Haan	1.02	1	−3
BBB	Caroline van der Plas	1.00	1	New
BIJ1	Sylvana Simons	0.84	1	+1
This lists parties that won seats. See the complete results below.
Most voted-for party by municipality
Cabinet before	Cabinet after
Third Rutte cabinet VVD–CDA–D66–CU	Fourth Rutte cabinet VVD–D66–CDA–CU

General elections were held in the Netherlands from 15 to 17 March 2021 to elect all 150 members of the House of Representatives. Following the elections and lengthy coalition formation talks, the sitting government remained in power.

The elections had originally been scheduled to take place on 17 March; however, due to the COVID-19 pandemic, the government decided to open some polling stations two days in advance to ensure safe voting for elderly and immunocompromised citizens. Citizens aged 70 years or older were also given the opportunity to vote by post.

== Background ==
=== Previous election ===
The 2017 general election was held after a five-year coalition government between the People's Party for Freedom and Democracy (VVD) and Labour Party (PvdA). The PvdA suffered heavy losses in the election, being reduced from 38 to 9 seats, while the VVD lost 8 seats, falling from 41 to 33 but remaining the largest party. The Party for Freedom (PVV) came in second with 20 seats, 5 more than it won in the 2012 election, while the Christian Democratic Appeal (CDA) gained 6 seats to win 19 in total. Democrats 66 (D66) gained 7 to win 19, GroenLinks (GL) gained 10 to win 14, and the Socialist Party (SP) lost 1 to win 14. The election also saw two new parties, Denk and Forum for Democracy (FvD), enter the House of Representatives, winning 3 and 2 seats, respectively. Four other smaller parties maintained representation in the lower chamber: Christian Union (CU) and Party for the Animals (PvdD) with 5 seats each, 50PLUS with 4 seats, and the Reformed Political Party (SGP) with 3 seats.

The third Rutte cabinet was inaugurated after the longest coalition formation in Dutch history, with 225 days between the election and the cabinet being sworn in. The cabinet was led by Prime Minister Mark Rutte, who presided over a coalition consisting of the People's Party for Freedom and Democracy (VVD), Christian Democratic Appeal (CDA), Democrats 66 (D66) and Christian Union (CU). The coalition held a narrow majority in both legislative chambers at the time of the cabinet's inauguration, with 76 of 150 seats in the House of Representatives and 38 of 75 seats in the Senate. Following the 2019 Senate election, it had a minority of 32 seats in the upper chamber. After Wybren van Haga was expelled from the VVD faction in 2019, the coalition lost its majority in the House of Representatives. On 15 January 2021, two months before the election, the third Rutte cabinet resigned following a parliamentary inquiry into the Dutch childcare benefits scandal, and continued as a demissionary cabinet.

== Electoral system ==
Pursuant to articles C.1, C.2 and C.3 of the electoral law, elections for the House of Representatives take place every four years in March. The 150 members of the House of Representatives are elected by open list proportional representation. The number of seats per list is determined using the D'Hondt method. There is an official threshold of electoral threshold of 1/150th (0.67%) of votes to secure a seat. (If it did not exist, the portion of votes needed for a party to take its first seat might be lower than that if there are many wasted votes caused by some parties having vote tallies lower than the effective threshold of 0.67%.)

Voters have the option to cast a preferential vote, to mark a vote with a preference for an individual candidate. The seats won by a list are first allocated to the candidates who, in preferential votes, have received at least 25% of the number of votes needed for one seat (effectively 0.17% of the total votes), regardless of their placement on the electoral list. If multiple candidates from a list pass this threshold, their ordering is determined based on the number of votes received. Any remaining seats are allocated to candidates according to their placement on the electoral list.

== Participating parties ==
A record number of 89 parties registered with the Electoral Council in order to compete in the election. Most parties, however, did not achieve (nationwide) ballot access, as they were not able to pay the €11,250 deposit and/or did not receive enough endorsements (30 for each of the 19 electoral districts in the European Netherlands, and 10 for the Caribbean Netherlands).

Parties that met the requirements to participate in the election
List	Party		Lead candidate	Main ideology	Position	2017 result	Districts
1	People's Party for Freedom and Democracy	VVD	Mark Rutte	Conservative liberalism	Centre-right	21.3% (33 seats)	20
2	Party for Freedom	PVV	Geert Wilders	Right-wing populism	Right-wing to far-right	13.1% (20 seats)	20
3	Christian Democratic Appeal	CDA	Wopke Hoekstra	Christian democracy	Centre-right	12.4% (19 seats)	20
4	Democrats 66	D66	Sigrid Kaag	Social liberalism	Centre	12.2% (19 seats)	20
5	GroenLinks	GL	Jesse Klaver	Green politics	Centre-left to left-wing	9.1% (14 seats)	20
6	Socialist Party	SP	Lilian Marijnissen	Democratic socialism	Left-wing	9.1% (14 seats)	20
7	Labour Party	PvdA	Lilianne Ploumen	Social democracy	Centre-left	5.7% (9 seats)	20
8	Christian Union	CU	Gert-Jan Segers	Christian democracy	Syncretic	3.4% (5 seats)	20
9	Party for the Animals	PvdD	Esther Ouwehand	Animal rights	Left-wing	3.2% (5 seats)	20
10	50PLUS	50+	Liane den Haan	Pensioners' interests	Centre	3.1% (4 seats)	20
11	Reformed Political Party	SGP	Kees van der Staaij	Christian right	Right-wing	2.1% (3 seats)	20
12	Denk	Denk	Farid Azarkan	Minority rights	Centre-left	2.1% (3 seats)	20
13	Forum for Democracy	FVD	Thierry Baudet	National conservatism	Right-wing to far-right	1.8% (2 seats)	20
14	BIJ1	BIJ1	Sylvana Simons	Anti-capitalism	Far-left	0.3% (0 seats)	20
15	JA21	JA21	Joost Eerdmans	Conservative liberalism	Right-wing	—	20
16	Code Orange	CO	Richard de Mos	Direct democracy	Syncretic	—	20
17	Volt Netherlands	VOLT	Laurens Dassen	European federalism	Centre	—	20
18	NIDA	NIDA	Nourdin El Ouali	Islamic democracy	Syncretic	—	20
19	Pirate Party	PPNL	Matthijs Pontier	Pirate politics	Syncretic	0.3% (0 seats)	20
20	Libertarian Party	LP	Robert Valentine	Libertarianism	Right-wing	0.01% (0 seats)	20
21	JONG	JONG	Jaron Tichelaar	Youth politics	Centre	—	19
22	Splinter	SPL	Femke Merel van Kooten	Social liberalism	Centre-left	—	19
23	Farmer–Citizen Movement	BBB	Caroline van der Plas	Agrarianism	Centre-right	—	19
24	NLBeter	NLB	Esther van Fenema	Public sector interests	Syncretic	—	19
25	Henk Krol List	LHK	Henk Krol	Progressive conservatism	Centre-right	—	19
26	OpRecht	OR	Michael Ruperti	National conservatism	Right-wing	—	19
27	Jezus Leeft	JL	Florens van der Spek	Evangelism	Right-wing	0.03% (0 seats)	16
28	Proud of the Netherlands	ToN	Sander van den Raadt	Conservative liberalism	Right-wing	—	13
29	Ubuntu Connected Front	UCF	Regillio Vaarnold	Ubuntuism	Centre-left	—	13
30	Blank list		Anna Zeven	COVID-19 scepticism	Centre	—	12
31	Party of Unity	PvdE	Arnoud van Doorn	Islamism	Syncretic	—	8
32	The Party Party	DFP	Johan Vlemmix	Joke party	Syncretic	—	8
33	Free and Social Netherlands	VSN	Bas Filippini	COVID-19 scepticism	Centre	—	6
34	We Are the Netherlands	WZNL	Erwin Versteeg	Ethnic nationalism	Far-right	—	6
35	Modern Netherlands	MN	Niels Heeze	E-democracy	Syncretic	—	4
36	The Greens	DG	Otto ter Haar	Green politics	Centre	—	2
37	Party for the Republic	PvdR	Bruno Braakhuis	Republicanism	Centre	—	2

== Campaign ==
=== Debates ===
2021 Dutch general election debates
Date	Organisers	Channel	Venue	P Present A Absent invitee NI Non-invitee												
Date	Organisers	Channel	Venue	Azarkan	Baudet	Den Haan	Hoekstra	Kaag	Klaver	Marijnissen	Ouwehand	Ploumen	Rutte	Segers	Van der Staaij	Wilders
26 February	NOS	NPO Radio 1	Oude Zaal, Binnenhof, The Hague	P	P	P	P	P	P	P	P	P	P	P	P	P
28 February	RTL Nieuws	RTL 4	Felix Meritis, Amsterdam	NI	NI	NI	P	P	P	P	NI	NI	P	NI	NI	P
15 March	EenVandaag	NPO 1	Koninklijke Schouwburg, The Hague	NI	NI	NI	P	P	P	NI	NI	P	P	NI	NI	P
16 March	NOS	NPO 1	Statenpassage, Binnenhof, The Hague	NI	NI	NI	P	P	P	P	NI	P	P	P	NI	P

== Results ==
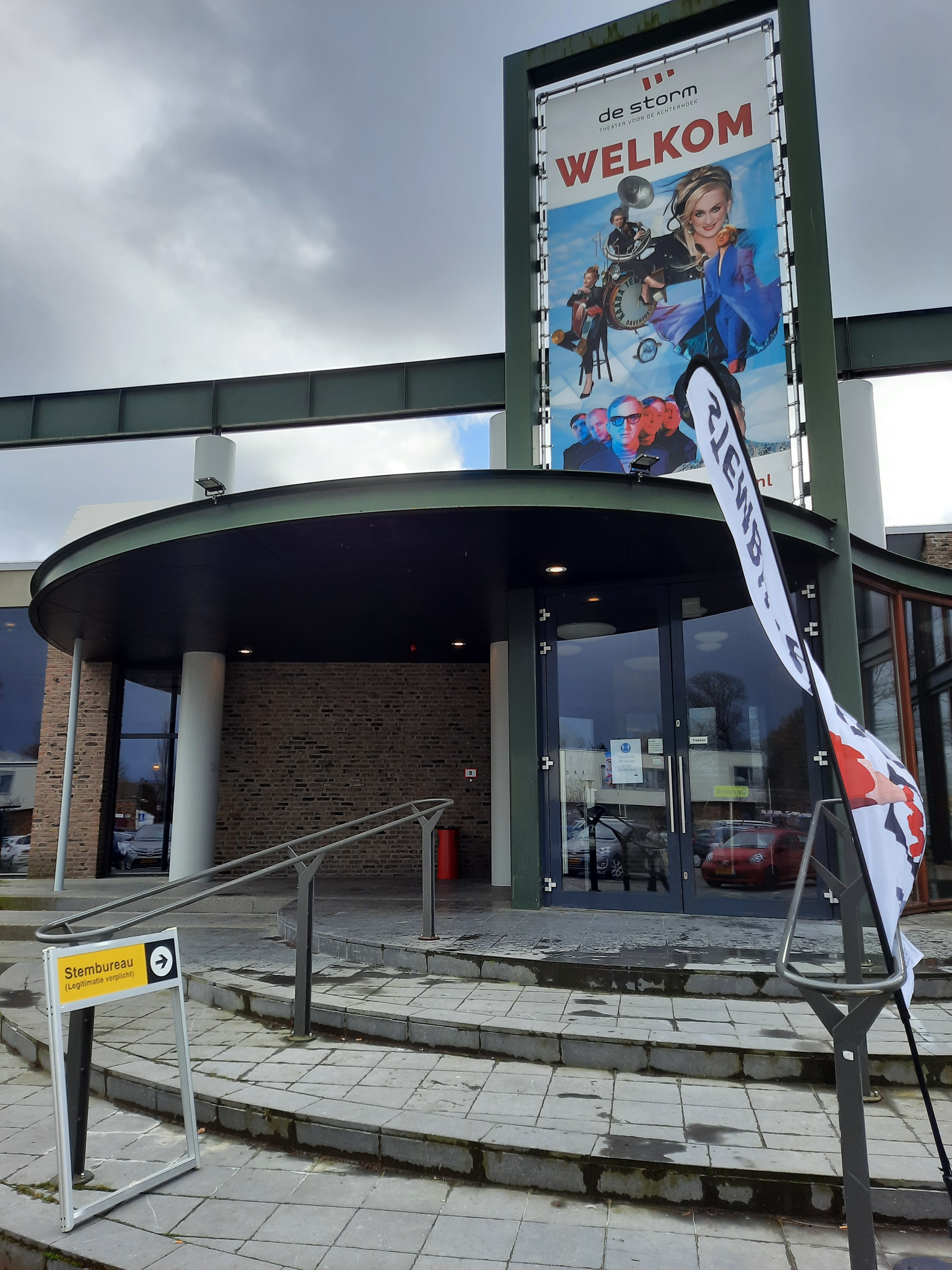
At least one polling station per municipality already opened its doors on Monday 15 March 2021 to offer people in the vulnerable target group the opportunity to vote at a quiet moment.

The left-wing parties' support - Socialist Party, Labour Party, and GroenLinks - totaled less than 20 percent of the vote. According to political scientist Cas Mudde, the steady decline of the left since 2006 can be explained mainly by a media agenda dominated by societal issues, especially identity issues, at the expense of economic and social issues. The fraction of wasted votes due to the electoral threshold was 1.99%.

The official results were published by the Electoral Council on 26 March 2021.

Party	Votes	%	+/–	Seats	+/–
People's Party for Freedom and Democracy	2,279,130	21.87	+0.58	34	+1
Democrats 66	1,565,861	15.02	+2.79	24	+5
Party for Freedom	1,124,482	10.79	−2.27	17	−3
Christian Democratic Appeal	990,601	9.50	−2.88	15	−4
Socialist Party	623,371	5.98	−3.11	9	−5
Labour Party	597,192	5.73	+0.03	9	0
GroenLinks	537,308	5.16	−3.97	8	−6
Forum for Democracy	523,083	5.02	+3.24	8	+6
Party for the Animals	399,750	3.84	+0.65	6	+1
Christian Union	351,275	3.37	−0.02	5	0
Volt Netherlands	252,480	2.42	New	3	New
JA21	246,620	2.37	New	3	New
Reformed Political Party	215,249	2.07	−0.01	3	0
Denk	211,237	2.03	−0.03	3	0
50PLUS	106,702	1.02	−2.09	1	−3
Farmer–Citizen Movement	104,319	1.00	New	1	New
BIJ1	87,238	0.84	+0.57	1	+1
Code Orange	40,731	0.39	New	0	New
NIDA	33,834	0.32	New	0	New
Splinter	30,328	0.29	New	0	New
Pirate Party	22,816	0.22	−0.12	0	0
JONG	15,297	0.15	New	0	New
Trots op Nederland	13,198	0.13	+0.13	0	0
Henk Krol List	9,264	0.09	New	0	New
NLBeter	8,657	0.08	New	0	New
List 30	8,277	0.08	New	0	New
Libertarian Party	5,546	0.05	+0.04	0	0
OpRecht	5,449	0.05	New	0	New
Jezus Leeft	5,015	0.05	+0.02	0	0
The Party Party	3,744	0.04	New	0	New
Ubuntu Connected Front	1,880	0.02	New	0	New
Free and Social Netherlands	942	0.01	New	0	New
Party of Unity	804	0.01	New	0	New
We are the Netherlands	553	0.01	New	0	New
Party for the Republic	255	0.00	New	0	New
Modern Netherlands	245	0.00	New	0	New
The Greens	119	0.00	+0.00	0	0
Total	10,422,852	100.00	–	150	0
Valid votes	10,422,852	99.62			
Invalid/blank votes	39,825	0.38			
Total votes	10,462,677	100.00			
Registered voters/turnout	13,293,186	78.71			
Source: Kiesraad

=== By province ===
Results by province
Province	VVD	D66	PVV	CDA	SP	PvdA	GL	FvD	PvdD	CU	Volt	JA21	SGP	Denk	50+	BBB	BIJ1	Others
Drenthe	20.4	12.7	12.4	11.0	8.7	7.5	4.0	5.6	3.3	4.6	1.4	2.1	0.8	0.3	1.1	2.2	0.2	1.9
Flevoland	21.1	12.1	12.2	7.9	5.7	4.8	4.3	7.0	3.6	4.2	1.7	2.6	4.1	2.5	1.2	0.9	1.9	2.4
Friesland	17.2	12.0	10.8	14.6	7.1	8.9	3.9	7.4	3.6	5.0	1.5	2.0	1.0	0.3	0.8	2.3	0.2	1.7
Gelderland	22.1	14.3	10.1	10.4	5.7	5.4	5.3	4.5	3.6	4.6	2.1	2.1	4.1	1.3	0.9	1.5	0.4	1.6
Groningen	14.9	15.4	10.2	8.8	9.5	9.1	6.5	5.1	4.4	5.5	2.9	1.6	0.8	0.5	0.9	1.7	0.6	1.8
Limburg	20.9	12.6	17.2	11.1	7.7	7.0	4.1	6.5	3.5	0.7	1.6	2.0	0.1	1.0	1.4	0.8	0.3	1.8
North Brabant	26.6	15.1	11.8	10.0	7.7	4.5	4.4	4.8	3.2	1.2	2.2	2.2	0.5	1.6	1.2	0.8	0.4	1.9
North Holland	21.4	18.4	9.1	6.7	5.3	6.1	6.5	4.7	5.2	1.8	3.4	2.4	0.3	2.9	1.0	0.5	2.1	2.4
Overijssel	19.9	12.2	10.4	15.9	5.5	5.3	4.0	5.1	2.6	5.7	1.9	2.0	3.1	1.3	0.8	2.6	0.3	1.5
South Holland	22.2	14.9	10.9	7.5	4.9	5.1	5.2	5.0	3.9	3.8	2.5	3.1	2.9	3.4	1.0	0.3	1.0	2.4
Utrecht	21.7	18.6	7.9	8.3	4.0	4.8	7.0	3.6	4.2	4.9	3.5	2.2	2.7	2.8	0.8	0.5	0.9	1.8
Zeeland	21.4	10.3	10.7	10.8	5.6	6.2	3.0	5.7	3.3	4.6	1.2	2.5	9.7	0.6	1.4	1.3	0.2	1.5
Caribbean Netherlands	10.1	12.3	3.9	30.8	2.0	6.9	4.4	3.4	3.2	4.0	1.1	0.8	0.2	2.3	0.4	—	5.0	9.1

== Government formation ==
Rutte claimed the result was a vote of confidence in the VVD and has ruled out a coalition with the PVV and FvD. He was expected to form a four-party government with D66, CDA, and smaller parties. On 23 March, Rutte said that he preferred a coalition with the new right-wing party called JA21, which has eight seats in the Senate that can help form a government majority in both chambers; however, this proposal could potentially meet with resistance from D66 due to disagreements on issues such as climate change, EU integration, and migration policies. If a coalition were formed including CU, there would be differences on medico-ethical issues with D66. Rutte could also potentially speak to left-wing parties, such as the SP, PvdA, GL, or Volt, if other attempts fail. SP leader Lilian Marijnissen said that it was very unlikely that she would join a VVD-led coalition but did not rule it out completely. PvdA leader Lilianne Ploumen said she would want to sit alone with another party, while GL leader Jesse Klaver said he is open to a progressive coalition with VVD and D66, despite the party's poor election performance.

While Rutte was in the process of negotiations to form a new coalition, informateur Kajsa Ollongren (D66) was photographed by a journalist of the Algemeen Nederlands Persbureau as she was leaving Parliament with a document from the coalition negotiations under her arm. The document contained the note "position elsewhere" next to the name of Pieter Omtzigt of the CDA, who has been a vocal critic of Rutte and played a key role in exposing the child welfare scandal that forced the resignation of Rutte's previous cabinet. This photograph caused speculation about whether Rutte was planning to sideline Omtzigt, but Rutte initially denied any involvement in the matter. After further notes emerged confirming he had discussed the possibility of Omtzigt as minister, he said he had "misremembered", and was accused by numerous opposition leaders of having lied to the media and the Dutch people. Parliament held a vote of no-confidence in Rutte as prime minister, which narrowly failed, but D66 and the CDA, which served in Rutte's previous cabinet, instead submitted a motion of censure against Rutte as parliamentary leader; this motion was passed by a large majority, with only Rutte's own VVD voting against. Informateurs Wouter Koolmees (D66) and Tamara van Ark (VVD) resigned after the scandal, and were replaced by veteran informateur Herman Tjeenk Willink (PvdA). On September 7, Johan Remkes was appointed as informateur. On September 30, the four parties from the previous governing coalition, the VVD, D66, CDA, and CU, agreed to negotiate forming the same coalition again. After long coalition talks, the four parties agreed to present their coalition agreement on 15 December 2021. With a coalition officially formed, the Fourth Rutte cabinet was inaugurated on 10 January 2022.
