= Nederland Wordt Beter =

Dutch anti-racism foundation (2012–2025)

- Abbreviation: NLWB
- Formation: 2012 (foundation since 5 December 2013)
- Founders: Jerry Afriyie, Raul Balai
- Type: Foundation (stichting)
- Chair: Jerry Afriyie
- Website: nederlandwordtbeter.nl

Nederland Wordt Beter (NLWB; lit. 'The Netherlands Is Getting Better') is a Dutch foundation and anti-racism movement. Among other campaigns, it initiated the Zwarte Piet is Racisme campaign, co-founded the action group Kick Out Zwarte Piet (KOZP) and was its legal and financial body. The movement emerged from a collective formed by the artist Raul Balai and Jerry Afriyie in 2010 and 2011, and set three goals for 2025: a Sinterklaas celebration without the blackface figure of Zwarte Piet ('Black Pete'), structural education on Dutch colonial history and slavery in schools, and a national commemoration of slavery. Besides protests, it ran various campaigns and projects, produced teaching materials for schools, initiated an annual Day of Empathy on 3 May and co-initiated the Zwart Manifest (Black Manifesto). The foundation ended its activities in December 2025, saying its goals had been achieved.

== History ==
=== Origins ===
After Jerry Afriyie gave a speech about Zwarte Piet in December 2010, Balai approached him about a joint effort to remove the figure from the Sinterklaas tradition. In January 2011 Balai brought together a group of artists, parents, musicians and politicians in Amsterdam, Afriyie among them. The campaign Zwarte Piet is Racisme grew out of this group. Its slogan was designed by the artist Quinsy Gario. The group's other project that year was Zwart van Roet, a multi-day event and exhibition at the MC Theater in Amsterdam on the history of the Sinterklaas festival and the figure of Zwarte Piet. Balai, Gario, Femi Dawkins and Felix de Rooy curated it. Participating artists, among them Remy Jungerman, Raquel van Haver, Patricia Kaersenhout and Charl Landvreugd, showed work on Black identity or critical reflections on Zwarte Piet. Balai later said the group presented its actions as art projects, which made it easier to start conversations with the public. At the national Sinterklaas parade in Dordrecht in November 2011, Afriyie and Gario stood silently along the route wearing the slogan Zwarte Piet is Racisme ("Black Pete is Racism") and were arrested violently. The National Ombudsman later found that the police had used disproportionate force and breached their freedom of expression. The protest and arrests became national news; according to de Volkskrant, this was what set off the wider national debate on Zwarte Piet. Time wrote that the arrests brought the resistance to Zwarte Piet into the mainstream.

In early 2012 the group wrote to the mayor of Amsterdam, Eberhard van der Laan, who then invited Afriyie, Gario and Balai, among others, for talks about the future of the Sinterklaas celebration in the city. These led to a joint approach to change the appearance of Zwarte Piet at the Amsterdam parade. The group took the name Nederland Wordt Beter in 2012 and became a foundation on 5 December 2013. The name was a variation on the campaign motto Nederland kan beter ("The Netherlands can do better").

=== Protests and legal action ===
In early 2014 the Zwarte Piet is Racisme campaign joined forces with the groups Stop Blackface and Zwarte Piet Niet to form Kick Out Zwarte Piet, which held its first meeting in February 2014 and from then on protested at Sinterklaas parades that featured blackface. In July 2014 NLWB and Zwarte Piet Niet were among the groups that disrupted the national slavery commemoration in Amsterdam's Oosterpark as Deputy Prime Minister Lodewijk Asscher was about to speak. Some protesters wore chains and carried a sign reading "Still no apologies".

On 1 July 2015, during the Keti Koti festival, the foundation and other groups invited people to file criminal complaints against Zwarte Piet for group discrimination; a mobile police unit was set up on the Museumplein for the purpose. When prosecutors declined to act, NLWB asked the court to order prosecution of the national broadcaster NTR, municipalities and retailers such as HEMA, Blokker and Albert Heijn. In June 2017 the court in Amsterdam rejected the request, while noting that the public debate was moving towards dropping the stereotypes.

In 2017 the mayor of Dokkum banned a planned demonstration by NLWB and KOZP at the national parade, after supporters of Zwarte Piet had blocked a motorway to stop the protesters' buses. In 2018 a court convicted 34 people involved in the blockade of the A7 for preventing a lawful demonstration, obstructing a public road and endangering traffic; the convictions became final in December 2020. In February 2020 a court ruled that the mayor's ban had been unlawful. On 5 December 2019 the foundation called on parents to keep their children home from school Sinterklaas parties that still featured blackface, and offered to contest any truancy fines.

Counter-protesters repeatedly pelted KOZP demonstrators with stones and other objects. In November 2018 protesters in several towns were met by football hooligans and other opponents; in Rotterdam they were pelted with smoke bombs and stones, and in Eindhoven with cans of beer and eggs. In Volendam in December 2021 they pelted protesters with fish waste, eggs and oliebollen; in 2026 a court called it "extreme violence against peaceful demonstrators" and gave three men community service. In November 2022 about 150 people stopped two cars carrying KOZP activists and Amnesty International observers on a motorway exit near Staphorst, throwing eggs, beating on the cars and lighting flares; the protest was called off. Three men were each sentenced to 180 hours of community service in 2024. In De Lier in November 2023 protesters were pelted with eggs, vegetables and fireworks, and police made nine arrests. In Yerseke in November 2024 about a hundred counter-protesters threw eggs, stones and fireworks at some twenty KOZP activists; four people were arrested.

=== Black Manifesto and Keti Koti ===
In March 2021 NLWB was one of the organisations, with The Black Archives, IZI Solutions, Zetje In and Black Queer & Trans Resistance NL, that launched the Zwart Manifest, a set of goals and action points against racism in twelve areas of society. Afriyie was one of its initiators. In June 2021 NLWB, the radio station FunX and The Black Archives started a petition to make Keti Koti on 1 July a national holiday and to ask for a formal apology for Dutch involvement in slavery. According to the petition page, it had gathered more than 65,000 signatures by 2026. In 2022 the same groups, with Lush and Tony's Chocolonely, launched the campaign Ik neem vrij op 1 juli ("I take 1 July off"), to commemorate and celebrate the abolition of slavery. By 1 July 2022 more than 100 organisations, among them Lush, Tony's Chocolonely and Patta, gave their staff the day off. In 2024 NLWB and The Black Archives published a guide for employers, the Handreiking Keti Koti.

=== Dissolution ===
The foundation had planned from the outset to achieve its goals within fifteen years and then stop. As early as November 2021 Afriyie said that he would leave NLWB and KOZP on 5 December 2025. In February 2024 the foundation publicly announced that KOZP would stop on that date. On 29 August 2025, at the Into the Great Wide Open festival on Vlieland, Afriyie launched the foundation's final campaign, Neem het stokje over ("Pick up the baton"). In November 2025 Afriyie said all three goals had been achieved: compulsory lessons on the colonial past and slavery had become part of the school curriculum, funding had been made available for the commemoration on 1 July, and Zwarte Piet had been "denormalised". KOZP held no protests in its final year. NLWB and KOZP said goodbye on 30 November 2025 with a farewell reception at the International Theatre Amsterdam. On 5 December they held a closing party at the Melkweg and stopped their activities; formal dissolution of the foundation was to follow. Much of its documentation was to go to the Amsterdam City Archives and The Black Archives.

From 2 November 2025 to 1 February 2026 the Amsterdam Museum and the foundation staged the exhibition Nederland, word beter! on fifteen years of Black activism at Beautiful Distress on the NDSM site in Amsterdam. It was opened by Gerda Havertong of Sesamstraat, who in 1987 had been one of the first to call Zwarte Piet racist on national television. Items on display included Afriyie's bulletproof vest, a smashed car window belonging to fellow activist Mitchell Esajas, a protest sign smeared with egg yolk and a pile of court documents. The museum's head curator, Imara Limon, said the aim was to show both the physical violence and the long struggle with institutions. A video by the artist Brian Elstak set Prime Minister Mark Rutte's apology for slavery against his own drawings under the question Excuses, en dan? ("Apologies, and then?"). The exhibition was part of the museum's Collecting the City programme, through which it collects material on the present-day city. A smaller travelling version toured six provinces from November 2025 to March 2026, starting at the Zeeland Library in Middelburg. The National Coordinator against Discrimination and Racism marked the end of the two organisations with a public tribute.

== Activities ==
=== Education ===
On 27 October 2015 the foundation presented a lesson plan on Sinterklaas and Zwarte Piet for upper primary school at the Vrije Universiteit Amsterdam. It was developed by the historian Roelof Jan Minneboo. In 2016, with funding from the City of Amsterdam, it extended this work to school boards, parents and participation councils, aiming to reach ten percent of Amsterdam's primary schools. Later lesson plans covered the history of Sint and Piet (2022), Dutch slavery and racism (2023), and empathy. In 2017 Afriyie and the documentary maker Sunny Bergman, together with the Amsterdam debate centre Pakhuis de Zwijger, set up the platform Wit Aan Zet ("White people, your turn"), calling on politicians and schools to tackle unequal opportunities in education. On 9 March 2018 six Amsterdam parties (D66, PvdA, GroenLinks, SP, ChristenUnie and BIJ1) signed the platform's manifesto on equal opportunities in primary and secondary education. With Wit Aan Zet the foundation produced a guide for teachers on recognising and discussing racism at school. In October 2025 Nederland Wordt Beter launched an online historical calendar of Dutch colonial and slavery history, Vergeten Bladzijden ("Forgotten pages").

=== Day of Empathy ===
From 2012 the foundation organised a Day of Empathy (Dag van Empathie) on 3 May, the day before the Remembrance of the Dead. Afriyie said the idea came from the hostility the campaign against Zwarte Piet met in 2011, when people told him they could not relate to the experience of racism. He contrasted the two minutes' silence asked of everyone on 4 May with the rest of the year, and described the day as "an invitation to get to know one another again". The day aimed to bring people into contact with the stories of neighbours and fellow residents with whom they seemed to have little in common. Each year the foundation held a main event with panel discussions, interviews and music. It was the foundation's longest-running project. Venues included the Amsterdam Public Library, Pakhuis de Zwijger and the International Theatre Amsterdam.

=== Inclusive Sinterklaas ===
The foundation's initiative Feest voor alle Kinderen ("A party for all children") helped families, schools and companies celebrate Sinterklaas without Zwarte Piet. Companies and organisations could sign a statement that they no longer used the figure; signatories included Lush, Tony's Chocolonely, Meta, WPP and Omroep Zwart.

=== Neem het stokje over ===
The final campaign, Neem het stokje over ("Pick up the baton"), asked Dutch society, from teachers to civil servants, to guard what had been achieved and to continue the work in their own field. Afriyie described it as protecting the movement's successes and carrying on the struggle on a terrain of one's own choosing. Through the website neemhetstokjeover.nl, launched in August 2025, people could register their own pledge. At the final exhibition hundreds of sticks hung on a wall with cards on which visitors could leave or take a pledge, such as "I teach my children about the history of slavery". The wind-down also included a guide for teachers on recognising and discussing racism in the classroom and an NLWB Handboek voor Activisten (Handbook for Activists).

== Organisation ==
The foundation described itself as a collective of parents, artists, teachers, students and academics, with around 150 volunteers a year. Afriyie was its chair. The New York Times described him in 2016 as the founder of Nederland Wordt Beter.

== Recognition ==
On 30 November 2025 Afriyie and Balai received the City of Amsterdam's Andreaspenning for their work to make the Sinterklaas celebration in the city more inclusive. On 10 December 2025 the Dutch League for Human Rights awarded its Clara Meijer-Wichmann Medal to the foundation for its campaign against Zwarte Piet and its work on the legacy of colonialism and slavery. According to the foundation, it was the first award it accepted as a movement; it had turned down earlier ones while its goals were unmet.

== Documentary ==
The short documentary Onze strijd: het einde van Nederland Wordt Beter (Our struggle: the end of Nederland Wordt Beter), directed by Naomi White for Omroep Zwart, follows the movement's final months and the criticism of its decision to stop. It premiered at the Netherlands Film Festival in 2026.

== See also ==
- Kick Out Zwarte Piet
- Zwarte Piet
