= 2023 Dutch general election =

- 22 November 2023
- All 150 seats in the House of Representatives; 76 seats needed for a majority
- Turnout: 77.75% (▼0.96pp)
Party	Leader	Vote %	Seats	+/–
PVV	Geert Wilders	23.49	37	+20
GL/PvdA	Frans Timmermans	15.75	25	+8
VVD	Dilan Yeşilgöz	15.24	24	−10
NSC	Pieter Omtzigt	12.88	20	New
D66	Rob Jetten	6.29	9	−15
BBB	Caroline van der Plas	4.65	7	+6
CDA	Henri Bontenbal	3.31	5	−10
SP	Lilian Marijnissen	3.15	5	−4
Denk	Stephan van Baarle	2.37	3	0
PvdD	Esther Ouwehand	2.25	3	−3
FvD	Thierry Baudet	2.23	3	−5
SGP	Chris Stoffer	2.08	3	0
CU	Mirjam Bikker	2.04	3	−2
Volt	Laurens Dassen	1.71	2	−1
JA21	Joost Eerdmans	0.68	1	−2
This lists parties that won seats. See the complete results below.
Most voted-for party by municipality
Cabinet before	Cabinet after
Fourth Rutte cabinet VVD–D66–CDA–CU	Schoof cabinet PVV–VVD–NSC–BBB

Early general elections were held in the Netherlands on 22 November 2023 to elect the members of the House of Representatives. The elections had been expected to be held in 2025, but a snap election was called after the fourth Rutte cabinet collapsed on 7 July 2023 due to disagreements on immigration policy between the coalition parties. The incumbent Prime Minister Mark Rutte announced that he would not lead his party into the election and that he would retire from politics.

In what was described as "one of the biggest political upsets in Dutch politics since World War II", the right-wing populist Party for Freedom (PVV), led by Geert Wilders, won 37 seats in the 150-seat House of Representatives, becoming the largest party for the first time. All four parties of the incumbent coalition government suffered losses.

After the election, a cabinet formation began to determine which parties would form the next government. Subsequently on 16 May 2024, a coalition agreement was settled upon by PVV, VVD, NSC and BBB. Immigration policy was heavily prioritised on the incoming government's agenda, as coalition representatives stated they would embrace the "strictest" asylum policy. Numerous reforms were also expected across areas such as welfare and health, as emphasised by NSC leader Pieter Omtzigt during the election campaign, similar to addressing issues having surfaced in the aftermath of the Dutch childcare benefits scandal. Several observers have described the new government as the most right-wing in recent history.

Following further negotiation amongst parties, Dick Schoof, an intelligence director, was then nominated for Prime Minister. Shortly afterwards, all participating parties agreed to the nomination. He then became Prime Minister in a new cabinet formation over a month later on 2 July after being formally appointed by the King.

== Background ==
The 2021 general elections resulted in the formation of the fourth Rutte cabinet, consisting of a coalition of the People's Party for Freedom and Democracy (VVD), Democrats 66 (D66), Christian Democratic Appeal (CDA) and the Christian Union (CU). Mark Rutte, leader of VVD, continued in his role as prime minister.

After 2019, the government had the intention to limit the human impact on the nitrogen cycle. However, its nitrogen bill met resistance from several opposition parties, including the Farmer–Citizen Movement (BBB), which was founded in 2019 and entered the House of Representatives after winning one seat in the 2021 elections. Its popularity grew quickly, and the BBB emerged as the largest party in the 2023 provincial elections, which also saw heavy losses for the ruling coalition. As the provincial councils indirectly elect the Senate, it meant that the ruling coalition would face more difficulty passing legislation.

The government resigned on 7 July 2023 after the four parties failed to agree on a proposed limitation of family reunification for refugees fleeing armed conflict. The coalition government led by Mark Rutte collapsed ahead of the anticipated November elections due to irreconcilable disagreements on migration issues. The dispute arose from Rutte's proposal to tighten restrictions on the reunification of asylum seekers' families, aiming to reduce the number of migrants following a previous scandal involving overcrowded migration centers. CDA supported Rutte's proposal, while the opposition of CU and D66 led to a breakdown in negotiations. The parties decided unanimously that they could not remain together in the coalition. The king asked that the prime minister and his government continue to carry out their duties in a caretaker capacity. This could have been seen as a move by Rutte to keep migration on the center stage as his party was disunited on his nitrogen policies.

=== Leadership changes ===
On 10 July 2023, Prime Minister Mark Rutte announced he would not run again as lead candidate for the VVD, and would leave politics when a new cabinet was sworn in. Other party leaders and parliamentary leaders also announced they would not return, including Sigrid Kaag (D66), Wopke Hoekstra, Pieter Heerma (both CDA), Attje Kuiken (PvdA), Kees van der Staaij (SGP), Farid Azarkan (Denk), Liane den Haan (independent), Nilüfer Gündoğan (independent), and Sylvana Simons (BIJ1). Jesse Klaver announced that, although he wanted to continue as member of parliament, he would not be candidate for leader of the Labour Party–GroenLinks alliance. Additionally, Vera Bergkamp, the Speaker of the House of Representatives, did not stand for reelection.

== Electoral system ==
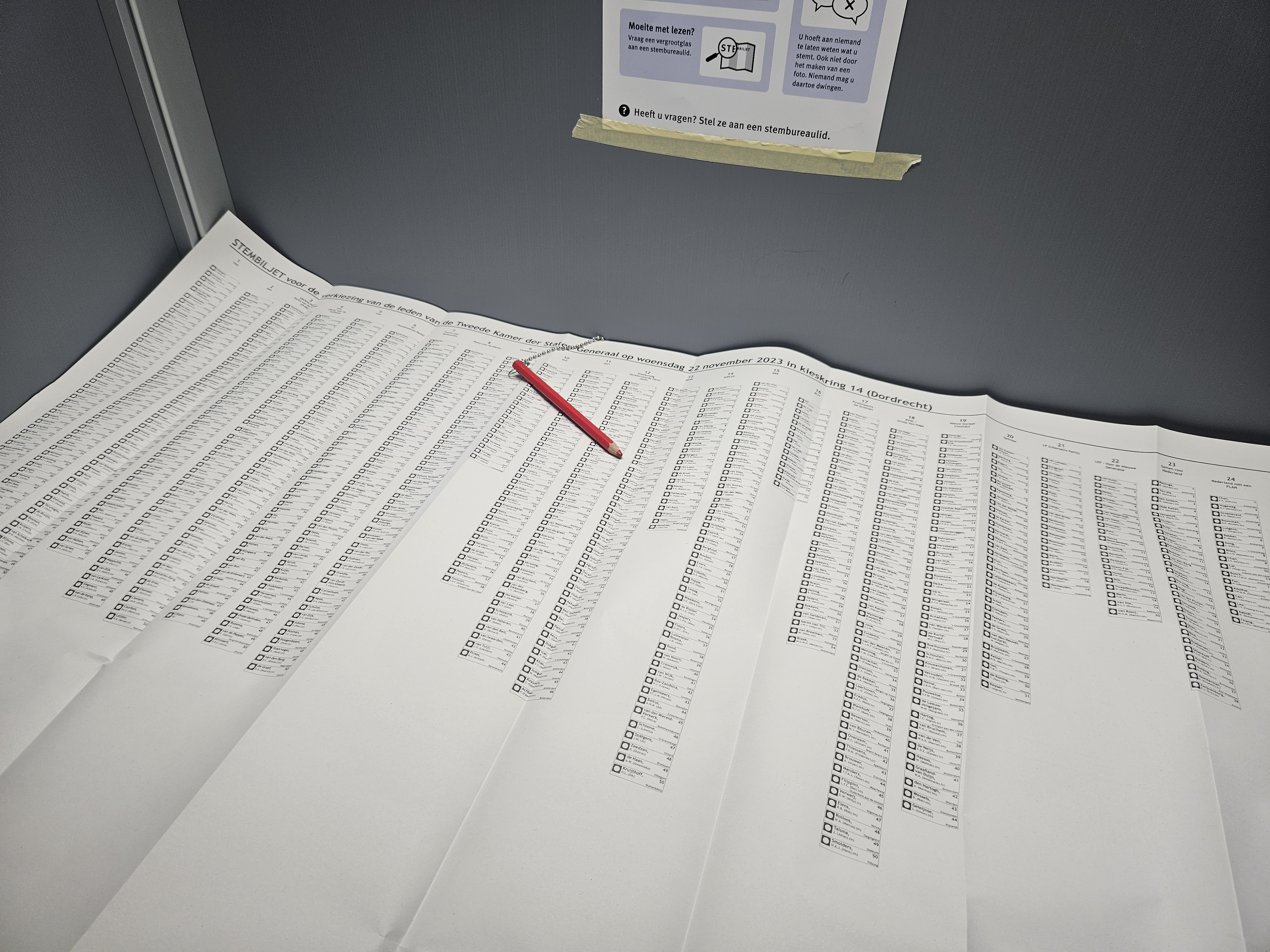
Ballot of the 2023 Dutch general election

Pursuant to articles C.1, C.2 and C.3 of the electoral law, elections for the House of Representatives take place every four years in March, unless a snap election is called. The 150 members of the House of Representatives are elected by open list proportional representation in a single nationwide constituency. The number of seats per list is determined using the D'Hondt method. A list must receive a number of votes equal to or exceeding the Hare quota (1 full seat) in order to qualify for seat distribution, meaning there is an electoral threshold of 0.67%. Voters have the option to cast a preferential vote. The seats won by a list are first allocated to the candidates who, in preferential votes, have received at least 25% of the Hare quota (effectively ¼ of a seat or 0.17% of the total votes), regardless of their placement on the electoral list. If multiple candidates from a list pass this threshold, their ordering is determined based on the number of votes received. Any remaining seats are allocated to candidates according to their position on the electoral list.

== Political parties and lead candidates ==
Parties on the ballot
List	Party		Main ideology	Lead candidate	2021 result	Districts	Ref.
1	People's Party for Freedom and Democracy	VVD	Liberal conservatism	Dilan Yeşilgöz	21.87% (34 seats)	20	
2	Democrats 66	D66	Social liberalism	Rob Jetten	15.02% (24 seats)	20	
3	GroenLinks–PvdA: GreenLeft; Labour Party	GL/PvdA	Social democracy, green politics	Frans Timmermans	10.88% (17 seats) (Note: As the Labour Party (9 seats) and GroenLinks (8 seats))	20	
4	Party for Freedom	PVV	Nationalism, right-wing populism	Geert Wilders	10.79% (17 seats)	20	
5	Christian Democratic Appeal	CDA	Christian democracy, conservatism	Henri Bontenbal	9.50% (15 seats)	20	
6	Socialist Party	SP	Democratic socialism, left-wing populism	Lilian Marijnissen	5.98% (9 seats)	20	
7	Forum for Democracy	FVD	National conservatism, right-wing populism	Thierry Baudet	5.02% (8 seats)	20	
8	Party for the Animals	PvdD	Environmentalism, Animal rights advocacy	Esther Ouwehand	3.84% (6 seats)	20	
9	Christian Union	CU	Christian democracy	Mirjam Bikker	3.37% (5 seats)	20	
10	Volt Netherlands	Volt	Eurofederalism	Laurens Dassen	2.42% (3 seats)	20	
11	JA21	JA21	Conservative liberalism, right-wing populism	Joost Eerdmans	2.37% (3 seats)	20	
12	Reformed Political Party	SGP	Christian right	Chris Stoffer	2.07% (3 seats)	20	
13	Denk	Denk	Minority interests	Stephan van Baarle	2.03% (3 seats)	20	
14	50PLUS	50+	Pensioners' interests	Gerard van Hooft	1.02% (1 seat)	20	
15	Farmer–Citizen Movement	BBB	Agrarianism	Caroline van der Plas	1.00% (1 seat)	20	
16	BIJ1	BIJ1	Anti-racism	Edson Olf	0.84% (1 seat)	20	
17	Pirate Party–The Greens: Pirate Party; The Greens	PPNL/DG	Pirate politics, green politics	Mark van Treuren	0.22% (0 seats) (Note: As the Pirate Party (0 seats, 0.22%) and The Greens (0 seats, 0.00%))	20	
18	Interest of the Netherlands	BVNL	Right-wing populism, conservative liberalism	Wybren van Haga	—	20	
19	New Social Contract	NSC	Christian democracy	Pieter Omtzigt	—	20	
20	Splinter	SPL	Anti-identity politics	Femke Merel van Kooten-Arissen	0.29% (0 seats)	20	
21	Libertarian Party	LP	Libertarianism	Tom van Lamoen	0.05% (0 seats)	19	
22	LEF – For the New Generation	LEF	Youth politics	Daniël van Duijn	—	19	
23	Together for the Netherlands	SvN	Right-wing populism	Michel Reijinga	—	19	
24	Netherlands with a Plan	NLPLAN	Participatory democracy	Kok Kuen Chan	—	17	
25	Party for Sports	PvdS	Health promotion	Annemarie van Duivenboden	—	11	
26	Political Party for Basic Income	PPvB	Universal basic income advocacy	Sepp Hannen	—	8	

== Campaign ==
=== Debates ===
2023 Dutch general election debates
Date	Organisers	Channel	Venue	P Present I Invited NI Not invited A Absent																	Ref.
Date	Organisers	Channel	Venue	! class="nowrap ts-vertical-header " style="" | Baudet	! class="nowrap ts-vertical-header " style="" | Bikker	! class="nowrap ts-vertical-header " style="" | Bontenbal	! class="nowrap ts-vertical-header " style="" | Dassen	! class="nowrap ts-vertical-header " style="" | Eerdmans	! class="nowrap ts-vertical-header " style="" | Jetten	! class="nowrap ts-vertical-header " style="" | Marijnissen	! class="nowrap ts-vertical-header " style="" | Olf	! class="nowrap ts-vertical-header " style="" | Omtzigt	! class="nowrap ts-vertical-header " style="" | Ouwehand	! class="nowrap ts-vertical-header " style="" | Stoffer	! class="nowrap ts-vertical-header " style="" | Timmermans	! class="nowrap ts-vertical-header " style="" | Van Baarle	! class="nowrap ts-vertical-header " style="" | Van der Plas	! class="nowrap ts-vertical-header " style="" | Van Haga	! class="nowrap ts-vertical-header " style="" | Wilders	! class="nowrap ts-vertical-header " style="" | Yeşilgöz-Zegerius	Ref.
22 October	College Tour	NPO 3	Vrije Universiteit, Amsterdam	NI	NI	NI	NI	NI	NI	NI	NI	P	NI	NI	P	NI	P	NI	NI	P	
30 October	GL/PvdA, NSC	YouTube	Luxor Live, Arnhem	NI	NI	NI	NI	NI	NI	NI	NI	P	NI	NI	P	NI	NI	NI	NI	NI	
3 November	NOS	NPO Radio 1	Nieuwspoort, The Hague	P	P	P	P	P	P	P	P	A	P	P	P	P	P	P	P	P	
5 November	RTL Nieuws	RTL 4	Felix Meritis, Amsterdam	NI	NI	NI	NI	NI	NI	NI	NI	P	NI	NI	P	NI	NI	NI	NI	P	
12 November	RTL Nieuws	RTL 4	Felix Meritis, Amsterdam	NI	NI	NI	NI	NI	P	P	NI	A	P	NI	A	NI	P	NI	P	P	
16 November	Talpa TV	SBS6	Media Park, Hilversum	NI	NI	NI	NI	NI	NI	NI	NI	P	NI	NI	P	NI	NI	NI	P	P	
17 November	ND Verkiezingsdebat	YouTube	De Basiliek, Veenendaal	NI	P	P	NI	NI	NI	NI	NI	NI	NI	P	NI	NI	NI	NI	NI	NI	
17 November	SP, NSC	YouTube	Unknown	NI	NI	NI	NI	NI	NI	P	NI	P	NI	NI	NI	NI	NI	NI	NI	NI	
17 November	EenVandaag	NPO 1	Media Park, Hilversum	NI	P	P	NI	NI	NI	P	NI	NI	NI	NI	NI	NI	NI	NI	NI	NI	
18 November	EenVandaag	NPO 1	Media Park, Hilversum	NI	NI	NI	P	P	NI	NI	NI	NI	NI	NI	NI	P	NI	NI	NI	NI	
18 November	Omroep Brabant, Omroep Zeeland, L1		Evoluon, Eindhoven	NI	NI	P	NI	NI	P	P	NI	A	P	NI	A	NI	P	NI	P	P	
19 November	Jeugdjournaal	NPO 3	Media Park, Hilversum	NI	NI	P	NI	NI	P	NI	NI	A	NI	NI	P	NI	P	NI	P	P	
20 November	EenVandaag	NPO 1	Ahoy, Rotterdam	NI	NI	NI	NI	NI	P	NI	NI	P	NI	NI	P	NI	P	NI	P	P	
21 November	NOS	NPO 1	B67, The Hague	P	P	NI	P	P	NI	NI	P	NI	NI	P	NI	P	NI	P	NI	NI	
21 November	NOS	NPO 1	B67, The Hague	NI	NI	P	NI	NI	P	P	NI	P	P	NI	P	NI	P	NI	P	P	

=== NOS op 3 debates ===
In addition to the conventional debates, a series of debates between two or three party leaders were hosted by news program NOS op 3. The debates are broadcast through the programme's media outlets, such as radio and YouTube. The debates were broadcast in real-time and were held with a select group of young people present, who, in addition to the viewers on the YouTube live stream, asked the candidates various questions.

- 30 October: Mirjam Bikker (CU) and Esther Ouwehand (PvdD)
- 31 October: Pieter Omtzigt (NSC) and Frans Timmermans (GL/PvdA)
- 1 November: Thierry Baudet (FvD) and Rob Jetten (D66)
- 2 November: Caroline van der Plas (BBB) and Dilan Yeşilgöz-Zegerius (VVD)
- 3 November: Laurens Dassen (Volt), Edson Olf (BIJ1) and Chris Stoffer (SGP)
- 4 November: Henri Bontenbal (CDA) and Lilian Marijnissen (SP)
- 5 November: Joost Eerdmans (JA21), Stephan van Baarle (Denk) and Wybren van Haga (BVNL)

=== Assaults and attacks on Thierry Baudet ===
Thierry Baudet, founder and leader of the far-right Forum for Democracy (FvD) was attacked with an umbrella upon his arrival at Ghent University on 26 October 2023, resulting in a mild concussion.

On 20 November, Baudet was beaten with a beer bottle at a campaign event in Groningen, and was later hospitalised. Numerous politicians denounced the attack, with Mark Rutte stating that the attack was "totally unacceptable". The far-left group AFA Noord claimed responsibility for the attack.

== Opinion polls ==
The Farmer–Citizen Movement (BBB) established a lead in the polls following its victory in the 2023 Dutch provincial elections, but started to decline in May 2023, and further declined when Pieter Omtzigt announced he would contest the election with his newly established party New Social Contract (NSC), which immediately performed well in the polls at the expense of BBB. In the last polls before the election, NSC declined because it was unclear whether Pieter Omtzigt was willing to serve as prime minister should his party win the election. Their voters mostly diverted to VVD and PVV.

== Results ==
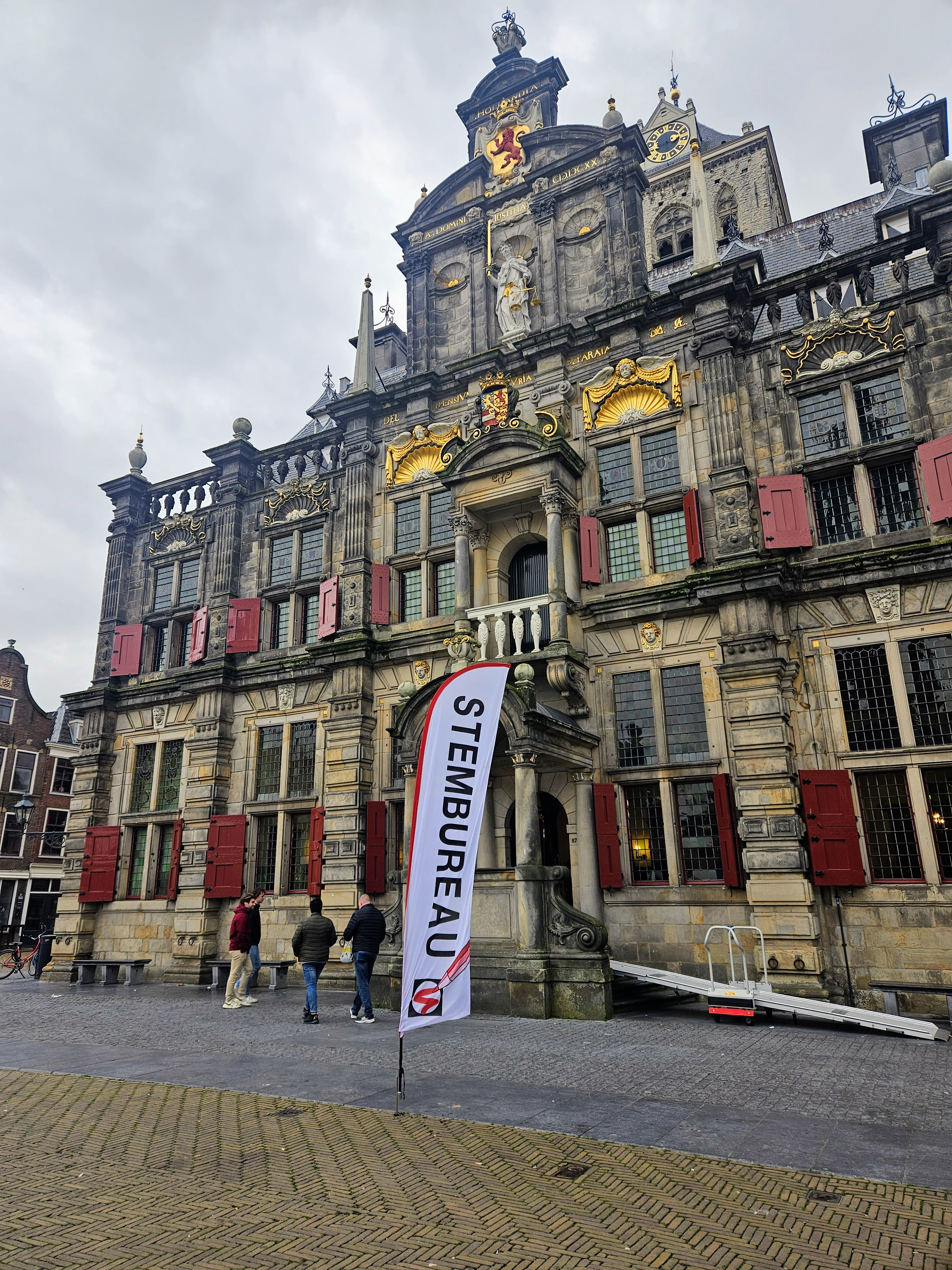
Delft City Hall on election day 2023

Geert Wilders' PVV won 37 seats of the 150-seat parliament, more than doubling their seats from the previous election in 2021. The left-leaning GroenLinks–PvdA (GL-PvdA) finished second with 25 seats. The VVD party ended third with 24 seats. NSC came fourth with 20 seats.

Party	Votes	%	+/–	Seats	+/–
Party for Freedom	2,450,878	23.49	+12.70	37	+20
GroenLinks–PvdA	1,643,073	15.75	+4.87	25	+8
People's Party for Freedom and Democracy	1,589,519	15.24	−6.63	24	−10
New Social Contract	1,343,287	12.88	New	20	New
Democrats 66	656,292	6.29	−8.73	9	−15
Farmer–Citizen Movement	485,551	4.65	+3.65	7	+6
Christian Democratic Appeal	345,822	3.31	−6.19	5	−10
Socialist Party	328,225	3.15	−2.83	5	–4
Denk	246,765	2.37	+0.34	3	0
Party for the Animals	235,148	2.25	−1.59	3	−3
Forum for Democracy	232,963	2.23	−2.79	3	−5
Reformed Political Party	217,270	2.08	+0.01	3	0
Christian Union	212,532	2.04	−1.33	3	−2
Volt Netherlands	178,802	1.71	−0.71	2	−1
JA21	71,345	0.68	−1.69	1	−2
Belang van Nederland	52,913	0.51	New	0	New
50PLUS	51,043	0.49	−0.53	0	−1
BIJ1	44,253	0.42	−0.42	0	−1
Splinter	12,838	0.12	−0.17	0	0
Pirate Party–The Greens	9,117	0.09	−0.13	0	0
Netherlands with a Plan	5,487	0.05	New	0	New
Together for the Netherlands	5,325	0.05	New	0	New
LEF – For the New Generation	5,122	0.05	New	0	New
Libertarian Party	4,152	0.04	−0.01	0	0
Party for Sports	3,966	0.04	New	0	New
Political Party for Basic Income	1,038	0.01	New	0	New
Total	10,432,726	100.00	–	150	0
Valid votes	10,432,726	99.59			
Invalid votes	19,655	0.19			
Blank votes	22,822	0.22			
Total votes	10,475,203	100.00			
Registered voters/turnout	13,473,750	77.75			
Source: Kiesraad

=== By province ===
Results by province
Province	PVV	GL- PvdA	VVD	NSC	D66	BBB	CDA	SP	Denk	FvD	PvdD	SGP	CU	Volt	JA21	Others
Drenthe	26.0	14.0	12.6	16.0	4.5	8.8	3.7	3.3	0.5	2.3	1.8	0.8	2.6	1.0	0.6	0.8
Flevoland	26.6	11.8	14.8	12.2	4.5	5.2	2.5	3.2	3.3	3.3	1.9	3.8	2.6	1.1	0.7	2.6
Friesland	24.5	14.6	11.2	16.3	4.3	8.3	5.3	3.4	0.4	2.7	1.8	1.0	2.7	0.9	0.7	1.7
Gelderland	22.2	15.4	14.4	13.2	5.9	6.2	3.6	2.9	1.4	2.0	2.2	4.1	2.8	1.5	0.6	1.5
Groningen	21.8	20.2	9.9	14.6	5.7	6.1	3.0	4.5	0.8	2.3	2.7	0.9	3.4	1.9	0.6	1.7
Limburg	33.3	13.5	13.8	14.1	4.8	4.4	3.4	3.7	1.2	2.3	1.7	0.1	0.3	1.0	0.6	1.7
North Brabant	26.9	13.1	18.1	12.7	6.6	4.4	3.5	4.1	1.8	1.9	1.8	0.4	0.6	1.6	0.7	1.7
North Holland	19.8	20.7	17.1	10.1	7.9	3.2	2.3	3.1	3.4	2.5	3.1	0.3	1.0	2.3	0.7	2.8
Overijssel	22.0	11.6	11.1	21.9	4.3	8.5	3.5	2.4	1.4	2.1	1.5	3.0	3.4	1.3	0.6	1.1
South Holland	23.8	14.7	16.0	10.9	6.4	2.6	3.3	2.7	4.1	2.4	2.3	3.1	2.4	1.8	0.8	1.9
Utrecht	17.6	20.5	16.2	10.5	8.4	2.8	3.4	2.3	3.1	1.8	2.8	2.8	3.0	2.6	0.6	1.6
Zeeland	23.9	11.1	14.7	12.1	4.1	5.9	4.3	3.1	0.8	2.5	1.8	9.7	2.9	0.7	0.7	1.7
Caribbean Netherlands	10.9	13.8	10.7	8.2	26.2	5.0	1.6	1.5	0.4	2.3	2.2	0.4	11.7	1.4	0.3	3.5
Postal voters abroad	6.3	28.6	17.4	12.1	10.5	3.2	1.9	1.9	0.3	3.3	4.0	0.7	1.6	5.2	0.8	2.2

=== Maps ===
Results by municipality, shaded according to the vote share won by largest party

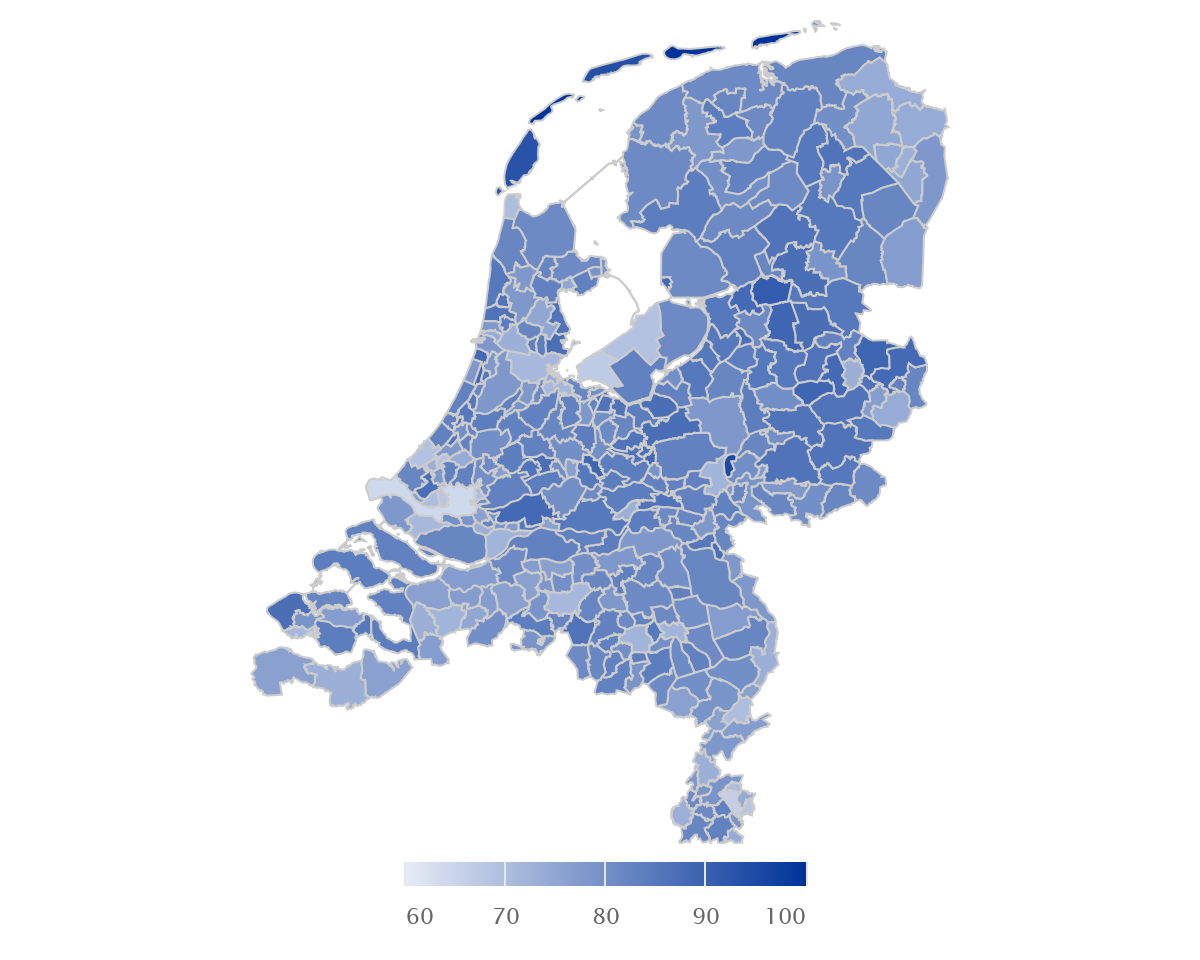
Voter turnout by municipality

Results by province, shaded according to the vote share won by largest party

== Aftermath ==
=== Political analysis ===
International media described the results as "one of the biggest political upsets in Dutch politics since World War II", and as a landslide victory for the Party for Freedom (PVV). Many analysts speculated that the rise of the PVV was due to great debate performances by Wilders in the weeks leading to the election. When migration became the largest issue of the election, it helped to boost the appeal of Wilders. Some politics journalists opined that Wilders was able to build wider support by softening some of his statements after VVD leader Dilan Yeşilgöz suggested she might include the PVV in negotiations and declaring in a debate that he would be "a Prime Minister for all Dutch people". Others commented ahead of the election that newer anti-establishment and alternative parties to the PVV such as the Forum for Democracy, JA21, BBB and Pieter Omtzigt's New Social Contract ran out of steam when voters, having experimented with them, moved back to the PVV because Wilders had remained a stronger and more consistent political figure.

In addition, the leader of the GroenLinks–PvdA coalition, Frans Timmermans, was disliked by many right-wingers, and since the VVD and NSC did not directly rule out working with either PVV or GL-PvdA, this led to right-wing voters consolidating around Wilders in order to prevent a Timmermans premiership. The Farmer–Citizen Movement saw a decline from their peak in the provincial elections in March, with many of their voters going towards NSC or PVV, for issues around nitrogen emissions were only a minor topic in the campaign.

The Dutch Parliamentary Election Study, a cooperation between 38 political scientists and sociologists, confirmed that migration was the largest concern amongst voters, resulting in the election win of issue owner PVV. Furthermore, it concluded a third of the electorate had changed their favored party during the campaign, including across different ideological blocks. The latter was partly caused by low trust in politics. According to the study, many voters – especially those voting for the PVV – favored a strong leader as a result of past political crises.

=== Reactions ===
Following his party's performance, Wilders was praised by Hungary's Prime Minister, Viktor Orbán. He was also praised by far-right leaders across Europe such as Marine Le Pen, Matteo Salvini, André Ventura, Alice Weidel, Tom Van Grieken, and Santiago Abascal.

All parties of the incumbent coalition government lost seats in this election. Incumbent coalition party Democrats 66 leader Rob Jetten blamed the senior coalition party VVD and its leader Dilan Yeşilgöz for the successes of Wilders and the PVV in the election, saying on election night that "Yeşilgöz left the door wide open for Wilders" and blaming her party's campaign strategy for allowing "the politics of intolerance [to be] normalized while it should never be normal". Yeşilgöz denied her party's strategy was to blame for the PVV's success, saying: "It was not the VVD that made the PVV great. The voters did that."

=== Government formation ===
In February, Kim Putters (PvdA) was appointed informateur to determine the best structure for a new cabinet. He recommended forming an extra-parliamentary cabinet with PVV, VVD, NSC, and BBB. Under the guidance of informateurs Elbert Dijkgraaf and Richard van Zwol, these parties reached an agreement on 15 May. Minister selection began on 23 May with formateur Van Zwol. On 28 May, civil servant Dick Schoof (independent) was nominated as Prime Minister after Ronald Plasterk withdrew over integrity concerns and other individuals refused. The 29 cabinet members were sworn in on 2 July.

== See also ==
- List of members of the House of Representatives of the Netherlands, 2023–2025
