= Jerry Afriyie (activist) =

Dutch activist and poet

- Afriyie in 2019
- Born: Jerry King Luther Afriyie; 30 April 1981 (age 45); Bechem, Ghana
- Other name: Kno'ledge Cesare
- Occupations: Activist, poet
- Known for: Zwarte Piet is Racisme, Kick Out Zwarte Piet

Jerry King Luther Afriyie (born 30 April 1981) is a Dutch activist and poet, born in Ghana. He has performed as a poet and rapper under the name Kno'ledge Cesare. In 2011 he and Quinsy Gario began protesting against the blackface figure of Zwarte Piet with the slogan "Zwarte Piet is racisme" ("Black Pete is racism"). He co-founded Nederland Wordt Beter (NLWB) and was a co-founder and the frontman of Kick Out Zwarte Piet (KOZP). Both ended their activities on 5 December 2025.

== Early life ==
Afriyie was born in Bechem, Ghana, on 30 April 1981. His father named him after Martin Luther King Jr. His father left for the Netherlands when Afriyie was three, and he grew up partly with his grandmother and aunts. Eight years later his father came back for him and his younger brother. His mother stayed in Ghana. The family lived in Utrecht for four years and then moved to Amsterdam-Zuidoost.

In Ghana he had been among the best pupils in his class. According to Afriyie, after a year in the Netherlands he was placed in pre-vocational education on the basis of a test that took no account of his school record in Ghana or of the fact that he had only been speaking Dutch for a few months. He later called it terrible. He saw his first Sinterklaas parade in Utrecht in 1993 and loved it, but other children soon taunted him as "Zwarte Piet" in a fight. He later said that from a young age he came to realise that the tradition was influenced by racism.

He turned to rap at fourteen. His stage name refers to Cesare Borgia. He set up the Soul Rebel Movement, which runs activities for young people in Amsterdam-Zuidoost. To support his children he trained and worked as a security guard, alongside his work as a poet and performer.

== Activism ==
=== Zwarte Piet is Racisme ===
In January 2011 the artist Raul Balai called a meeting of a few dozen people who wanted Zwarte Piet gone. Afriyie was one of them. He and Gario launched the campaign Zwarte Piet is Racisme on 1 July 2011, at the Keti Koti celebration in Amsterdam's Oosterpark. An academic study of Dutch anti-racism places their protest within an apparent "second wave" of anti-racist activism in the Netherlands since 2011, in which Zwarte Piet became a symbol of everyday racism.

On 12 November 2011, at the national Sinterklaas parade in Dordrecht, Afriyie and Gario stood silently along the route in shirts reading "Zwarte Piet is racisme". Police arrested them violently, together with two students. Bystanders filmed the arrests. The National Ombudsman later found the force disproportionate and a breach of their freedom of expression. NBC News wrote in 2015 that the arrest helped bring the objection to Zwarte Piet into the mainstream.

In 2012 the mayor of Amsterdam, Eberhard van der Laan, invited Afriyie and Balai to his official residence. The talks led to an agreement to change the look of Zwarte Piet in the city within four years. At the Amsterdam parade of November 2013 he spoke for one of the protest groups and called for every racial feature of the figure to go.

=== Arrests and trial ===
Afriyie was also arrested at protests in Gouda in 2014 and Rotterdam in 2016. In Gouda, he said, an officer put him in a chokehold until he could not breathe. Police detained around ninety supporters and opponents of Zwarte Piet that day, but only Afriyie was charged. Prosecutors asked for a €1,500 fine for resisting arrest and assaulting an officer. In October 2016 the district court imposed no penalty. It found that the police had been too rough with him and that the arrests had wrongly limited freedom of expression. In July 2017 the appeals court fined him €500 for resisting arrest. It did not find it proven that he had assaulted an officer.

After a police officer filed an assault complaint against him following the Gouda arrest, the Utrecht police chief withdrew his security licence in 2015, and he lost his job. A court ruled in May 2018 that the withdrawal was lawful.

In Rotterdam, on 12 November 2016, he was arrested again. Amnesty International looked at video of the arrest and said the police had used disproportionate force. At least one officer punched him in the face. Amnesty asked the Rotterdam police chief to investigate. El País described him that year as one of the leading figures of the movement, arrested several times.

=== Kick Out Zwarte Piet ===
In 2014 the Zwarte Piet is Racisme campaign joined forces with two other groups, Stop Blackface and Zwarte Piet Niet, to form Kick Out Zwarte Piet. Afriyie was its best-known spokesman and gave almost all of its interviews. At a Sinterklaas parade in November 2015 he and other protesters briefly stopped the parade by standing in the path of men dressed as Zwarte Piet. The New York Times described him in 2016 as a poet and the founder of Nederland Wordt Beter.

In November 2018 KOZP protested against Zwarte Piet in eighteen towns. Afriyie told the German press agency that the figure was racist but the people who celebrated it were not. In Eindhoven that day, PSV hooligans threatened him and other protesters and threw eggs, beer cans and bananas. He told Al Jazeera that some counter-protesters gave Nazi salutes. In November 2019 masked men with baseball bats and fireworks tried to break up a meeting he held with other activists in The Hague. In June 2020 a letter arrived threatening to kill him and his family. He reported it, and Amsterdam police said they were treating it very seriously.

Afriyie came to support a compromise figure: a "Chimney Pete" with only a smudge of soot. Defenders of the tradition rejected it, and some Black Dutch critics thought it did not go far enough. Many towns adopted it anyway. When the broadcaster behind the televised national parade dropped blackface in September 2019, he called it "a beautiful, historic day" and said the campaign would go on in towns that kept the old figure.

A 2017 report by the National Coordinator for Security and Counterterrorism (NCTV) mentioned KOZP. After the group complained, the NCTV wrote in May 2019 that it had never seen KOZP as extremist or terrorist. Afriyie said councils had cancelled meetings and school lessons because of the report, and that he had needed protection at some events.

He spoke for KOZP on 7 September 2023 at a roundtable on the right to protest, held by the home affairs committee of the House of Representatives. In 2024, after Dutch fans at Euro 2024 dressed as Ruud Gullit in blackface, he told The Athletic that intentions did not matter and that what counted was the impact.

KOZP said in November 2025 that it would stop on 5 December, the eve of the Sinterklaas holiday, as part of the end of Nederland Wordt Beter. Afriyie said the movement had achieved the three goals it set at the start: lessons on the colonial and slavery past in schools, a national commemoration of slavery, and an end to Zwarte Piet. The group held no protests that year. The aim, he told Agence France-Presse, had been to "de-normalise" blackface. Der Spiegel called him one of the most prominent faces of the group.

=== Black Lives Matter, Zwart Manifest and slavery apology ===
Afriyie was one of the activists on stage at the anti-racism protest on Dam Square on 1 June 2020, held after the murder of George Floyd. Thousands came. KOZP and Nederland Wordt Beter were among the organisations behind Black Lives Matter protests in the Netherlands that month. Afriyie was one of the organisers of a protest in the Bijlmer on 10 June and spoke at demonstrations in Den Bosch and Leeuwarden on 13 June. In July 2020 he told the BBC that people in the Netherlands had also died in police custody without anyone being arrested, and that the country had problems with "white-supremacy" sentiment. In March 2021 he was among the initiators of the Zwart Manifest (Black Manifesto), a list of demands to tackle institutional racism. Ministers Wouter Koolmees and Kajsa Ollongren accepted it on 10 June 2021. When King Willem-Alexander apologised for slavery on 1 July 2023, Afriyie welcomed the speech and asked politicians to turn it into concrete action.

=== Day of Empathy ===
The Day of Empathy (Dag van Empathie) was first held in 2012. It falls on 3 May, a day before the Remembrance of the Dead. Afriyie said the idea came from the hostility the campaign against Zwarte Piet met in 2011, when people told him they could not relate to the experience of racism. He contrasted the two minutes' silence asked of everyone on 4 May with the rest of the year, and described the day as "an invitation to get to know one another again".

== Recognition ==
Pakhuis de Zwijger, a debate centre in Amsterdam, gave Afriyie its first Nieuw Amsterdam Prijs on 9 January 2018 for his work towards an inclusive Sinterklaas. He and Raul Balai received the City of Amsterdam's Andreaspenning on 30 November 2025. On 10 December 2025 the Dutch League for Human Rights awarded its Clara Meijer-Wichmann Medal to Nederland Wordt Beter. Afriyie, whom the League described as its founder and chair, accepted the medal with other board members.
