= Rebekka Timmer =

Dutch politician

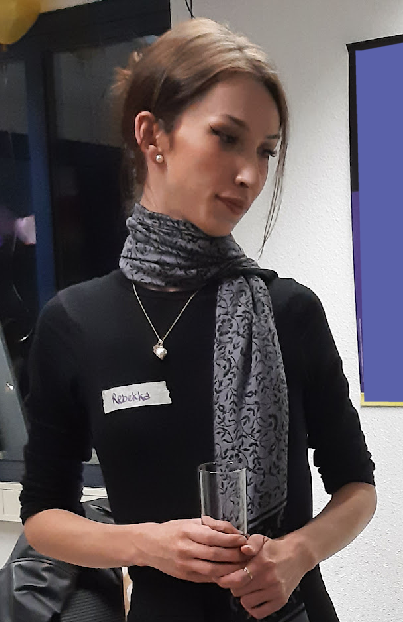

Party leader chairwoman of BIJ1
- In office 2023–2025

Personal details
- Born: 1999 (age 26–27) Hilversum, Netherlands
- Party: PTB-PVDA (2024-)
- Other political affiliations: BIJ1 (2018-2025); SP (2012-2018)
- Occupation: Politician

Rebekka Timmer (born 1999) is a Dutch politician and far-left activist. She served as the party chairwoman and head of policy for BIJ1 and was formerly a member of the Dutch Socialist Party.

Timmer became active in the Socialist Party as a teenager and was elected to Hilversum municipal council in 2018. During her time on the council, she became known for her activism against Zwarte Piet and for the renaming of streets and public spaces that refer to Dutch colonial history. In 2018, she joined BIJ1 founded by Sylvana Simons and cited her disagreements with the Socialist Party's stance on immigration as her motive. Timmer has described her views as anti-capitalist and has cited Che Guevara as a role model.

In 2019 she was elected to the national board of BIJ1 and head of the party programme committee ahead of the 2021 Dutch general election. She also stood third on the party's list for the House of Representatives but was not elected. In 2022, she succeeded Jursica Mills as BIJ1 chairwoman after Mills resigned from the post, citing a toxic climate in the party. Her appointment caused a split within the Amsterdam branch of the party. In 2023, she stood down as chairwoman. In August 2025, she resigned her membership of BIJ1 with immediate effect citing persistent internal issues within the party.
