= Bij1 =

Dutch political party

- Leader: Tofik Dibi
- Founders: Sylvana Simons; Ian van der Kooye
- Founded: 24 December 2016
- Split from: Denk
- Youth wing: Radicaal
- Membership (2023): 5,276
- Ideology: Socialism; Anti-racism; Feminism
- Political position: Left-wing to far-left
- Colours: Yellow; Black
- House of Representatives: 0 / 150
- Municipalities: 2 / 8,237

Party flag

Website
- bij1.org

Bij1 (Dutch: [bɛiˈeːn], lit. 'together'), stylised as BIJ1, formerly known as Article 1 (Dutch: Artikel 1), is a political party in the Netherlands. It is described as socialist and is on the left-wing to far-left of the political spectrum. It was founded in Amsterdam in 2016 by Sylvana Simons, a media personality and politician who was formerly briefly connected to another party, Denk. Bij1 saw a breakthrough during the 2018 municipal elections and 2021 Dutch general election in which it won representation in parliament but went through a long period of internal unrest and instability after. Former GroenLinks politician Tofik Dibi has led the party since August 2025.

== History ==
=== Foundation ===
In 2016, Sylvana Simons joined Denk, a political movement founded by MPs Tunahan Kuzu and Selçuk Öztürk after leaving the Labour Party following an internal dispute over the party's position on integration. Simons agreed to act as a communications advisor for the party at the invitation of Kuzu and announced her intention to join Denk's candidate list for the next general election. However, in December of the same year Simons left the movement and later said she was disappointed by the lack of support she received from the party during a period of intense death threats and argued Denk was more focused on media publicity. She also felt that Denk was becoming increasingly conservative and losing interest in progressive causes such as LGBT rights.

Shortly after her departure from Denk, Simons announced she had founded her own party with Denk's former campaign manager Ian van der Kooye, named Article 1. The name referred to the first article of the Dutch constitution, which prohibits discrimination based on race, religion, gender or any other reason. Simons said Article 1 would follow a similar platform to Denk with a focus on ethnic minority and immigrant rights and a left-wing economic policy, but with a more progressive stance on gender equality and LGBT issues.

=== 2017 general election ===
Logo of Artikel1

On 15 March 2017, Article 1 contested the general election with Simons as lead candidate. Other prominent candidates were anthropologist Gloria Wekker and former Socialist Party senator Anja Meulenbelt. The party failed to get enough endorsements in the provinces of Friesland and Drenthe to get on the ballot.

Article 1 received 28,700 votes (0.27%), failing to reach the 0.67% threshold to get a seat in the House of Representatives. Most of the party's support came from municipalities with a large Afro-Dutch population, such as Amsterdam (2.5%), Almere (1.9%), Diemen (1.7%) and Rotterdam (1.3%). The party also achieved an above average result in the Caribbean Netherlands (1.6%). The party scored negligibly in the more rural municipalities and cities with little or no immigrant population.

=== Name change ===
The party was sued by anti-discrimination think tank Art.1 for trademark infringement. The judge's verdict was in favor of Art.1, and therefore Simons was forced to change the name of the party. On 29 October 2017, the new name was announced: Bij1. It refers to the Dutch word bijeen, which translates to "together".

=== 2018 municipal elections and breakthrough ===
In March 2018, the party only contested in the municipal election in Amsterdam. Sylvana Simons was again elected as lead candidate. During the campaign, one of the party's candidates was accused of lying on her résumé, in which she wrongfully claimed to be a psychiatrist. Her candidacy was eventually withdrawn.

Despite this incident, the party won 6,571 votes (1.9%), just enough to win a seat in the municipal council. The best results for Bij1 were in Amsterdam-Zuidoost, especially in the Bijlmermeer, which is home to a large Surinamese migrant population. In November 2018, Hilversum municipal councilor and Dutch Socialist Party spokeswoman Rebekka Timmer switched to Bij1 giving the party representation on the council for the first time. In June 2020, Timmer was elected to the party's executive board.

=== 2021 general election ===
In February 2020, the party announced that it would compete in the 2021 general election. Simons handed over the position of council leader in Amsterdam to fellow Bij1 councilor Jazie Veldhuyzen to focus on the election campaign. The candidate list was approved by the general assembly in November 2020. Sylvana Simons was again selected as lead candidate, while poet and anti-racism activist Quinsy Gario was placed on the second spot. The party was supported by prominent lijstduwers, such as academic Gloria Wekker, actresses Anousha Nzume and Romana Vrede and former national spokeswoman for sex worker labor union PROUD Yvette Luhrs. The party achieved 0.84% of the vote share, securing a seat in the House for the first time.

=== 2023 general election and subsequent internal problems ===
Following the 2021 general election the party saw a number of internal issues which resulted in splits and resignations. In July 2021, Quinsy Gario was suspended from the party following behaviour allegations following an external investigation into signs of insecurity within the party. He later cancelled his party membership which prompted the Bij1's entire executive board in The Hague to resign in protest. In March 2022, the party's leader in Almere Gladys Wielingen was told by Bij1's executive board to withdraw her candidacy for the municipal elections after she did not rule out cooperation with the Almere Party for Freedom group which the Bij1 leadership said went against their policy of total non-cooperation with "far-right parties." She was replaced by Georgine Panhuijsen as party group leader. In June 2022, the party's national chairwoman Jursica Mills left after claiming in a letter that Bij1 had become a party of "toxicity, cronyism and contradictions." She was replaced by Rebekka Timmer. In September 2022, relations between the party's leadership and the Bij1 board of the Amsterdam faction deteriorated after the board accused B1J1's leadership of interfering in the selection of the a new faction leader following Jazie Veldhuyzen's decision to stand down from the role and trigger a leadership election and raised accusations of fraud within the party. The board of the Amsterdam branch all later resigned from Bij1. At the same time, Gloria Wekker also accused the party of containing racism, misogyny and cancel culture within its ranks. Carla Kabamba was chosen as the party's Amsterdam faction leader in September but resigned at the end of the month and took her seat with her, causing Bij1 to drop to two seats in the capital.

In July 2023, Bij1 party lost all Amsterdam councilors and board members after Jazie Veldhuyzen and Nilab Ahmadi quit the party after a period of inactivity, citing a "toxic climate" and internal power struggles within the party and stated Simons had also insufficiently supported them which Simons denied.

After the November 2023 snap election was triggered following the collapse of the fourth Rutte cabinet, Simons announced on 24 July that she would not run for re-election and would stand down as lead candidate for the party citing health reasons, although her resignation also came with growing reports of instability within the party which had built up over the previous years. It was subsequently announced Edson Olf would lead Bij1 into the election. The party lost its seat in the House of Representatives. In December 2023, the party was forced to repay 127,000 euros in parliamentary subsidy payments after failing to provide necessary documents to the House finance committee to show the subsidies had been spent correctly.

In November 2024, the party's two former Amsterdam councillors, Veldhuyzen and Ahmadi, announced the launch of a new left-wing political group, De Vonk (lit. 'The Spark'). In May 2024, two of the party's Rotterdam councilors broke off to form an independent group leaving the party with one councilor in Rotterdam.

In January 2025, Georgine Panhuijsen, party leader and councillor in Almere switched to the Christian Union (ChristenUnie) citing internal problems as her reason. In August, Timmer also stood down as chairperson and quit the party along with three members of the party's executive board.

=== 2025 general election ===
Ahead of the 2025 Dutch general election, former GroenLinks member of parliament Tofik Dibi and editor-in-chief of the Wiardi Beckman Foundation and Dutch Labour Party member Patricia Dinkela put themselves forwards as candidates for party leader and lijsttrekker for the election. A third candidate Chanel Matil Lodik also stood but was excluded from the race, she then appealed her decision against the party's board claiming that after she had gone through the entire nomination process with the selection committee, the committee had not submitted her nomination to the board, which she believed was in conflict with the party's internal regulations. Dibi was nominated as leader, however the party did not secure enough votes for any candidate to be elected.

== Ideology ==
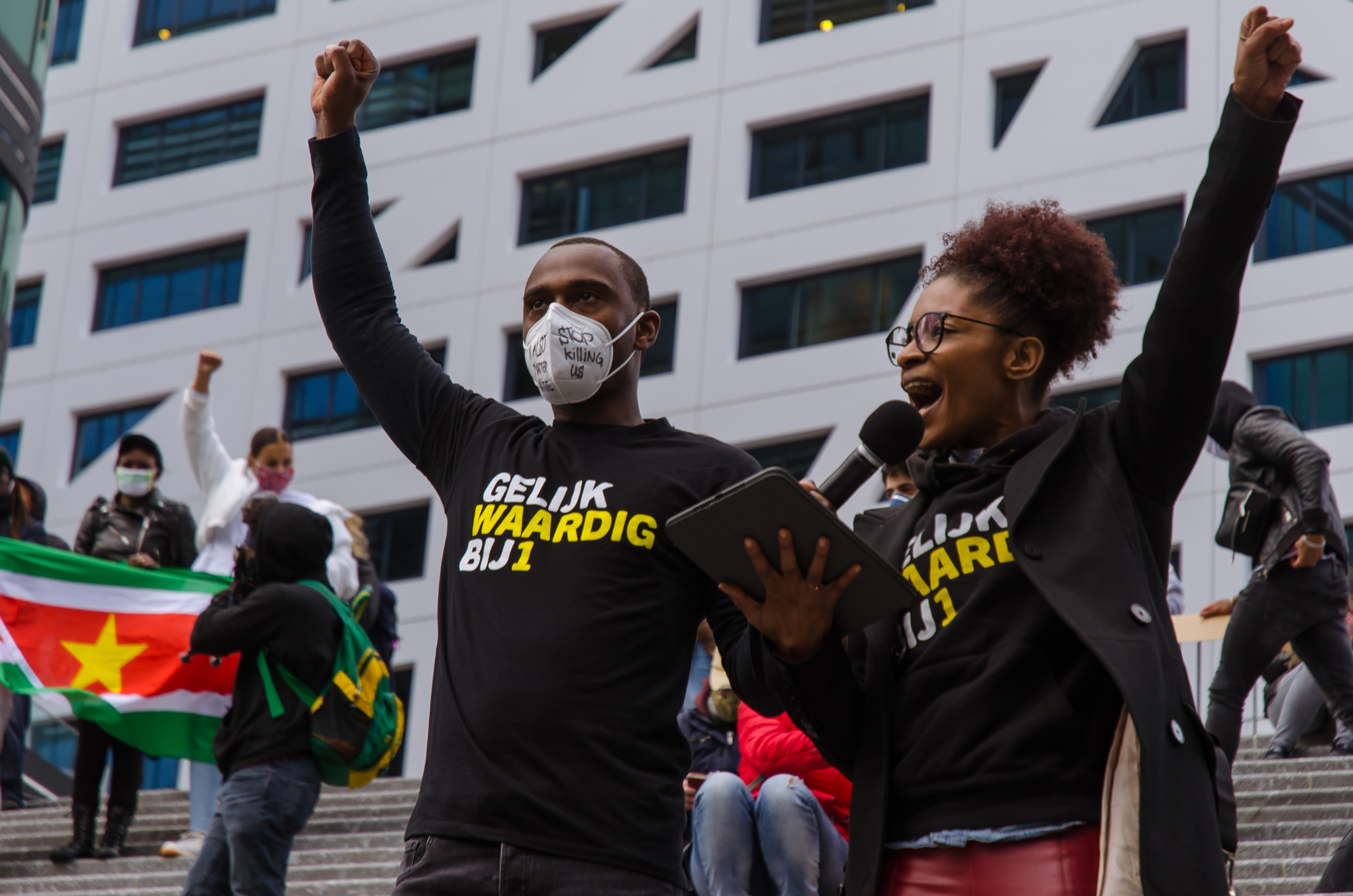
Sylvana Simons (right) at a Black Lives Matter protest in Utrecht in 2020

According to the party, its two pillars are radical equality and economic justice. The party supports the LGBT community, an end to ethnic profiling, and intersectionality. Because of the party's left-wing radicalism, it is often cited along with socialist parties and movements. Rebekka Timmer, member of the commission for the party program and number three on the list for the 2021 elections, however, shows an indifferent view in regards to the term communism, but admits to drawing inspiration from anti-capitalist thinkers, such as Karl Marx and has been described as Marxist. Founder, Sylvana Simons opposes communism as it is envisioned by China and the Soviet Union, calling it state capitalism.

The party has listed a core priority as ending various forms of discrimination, which the party has cited as racism, sexism, ableism, homophobia, and transphobia. The party supports a generous refugee policy, particularly for those seeking asylum from discrimination, it calls for a ban on the character Zwarte Piet, supports making Ketikoti a national holiday in the Netherlands as well as Suriname, official apologies for slavery and Dutch colonialism and proposes abolishing the Dutch monarchy by arguing for the Netherlands to become a republic. According to Simons, the party wants a fairer representation of female, immigrant and LGBTQ people in the government, public broadcast media and the workplace.

In foreign policy, the party advocates the independence and recognition of the State of Palestine and the Republic of South Maluku. It also calls for the Netherlands to end all support for Israel. It also supports paying reparations to former Dutch colonies such as the Dutch Caribbean, Suriname and Indonesia. The party also supports withdrawing the Netherlands from NATO and is opposed to stationing nuclear weapons on Dutch soil. Economically, the party calls for a single-payer healthcare system, the closing of the gender wage gap and replacing gross domestic product with the concept of gross national happiness as the dominant economic indicator.

=== Controversies ===
In November 2021, the Amsterdam branch of Bij1 sparked controversy after releasing a preliminary copy of the party's election program which referred to the Remembrance of the Dead commemoration as "basically racist" and argued that the commemoration should include “memorials to victims of Dutch violence from South America and Asia and to resistance heroes from former Dutch colonies”. The program stated "as long as this remains the case, Amsterdam will not accommodate this commemoration." The program statement was met with condemnation from other political parties and the Central Jewish Consultation who called it "a direct insult to the relatives of the more than 100,000 murdered Jews in the Netherlands, most of them from Amsterdam."

== Electorate ==
Bij1's electorate in the 2021 Dutch general election was largely concentrated in urban areas, especially in neighborhoods with a high percentage of immigrants, particularly from Afro-Dutch backgrounds. The party saw its best results in Amsterdam (5.8%), Diemen (4%), Almere (3.3%), and Rotterdam (3.1%). It saw its largest share in the Bijlmermeer area of Amsterdam. The party also polled above average in university cities such as Utrecht (2.1%) and Nijmegen (1.6%).

== Electoral results ==
=== House of Representatives ===
Election	Lead candidate	List	Votes	%	Seats	+/–	Government
2017	Sylvana Simons	List	28,700	0.27	0 / 150	New	Extra-parliamentary
2021	Sylvana Simons	List	87,635	0.84	1 / 150	▲1	Opposition
2023	Edson Olf	List	44,253	0.42	0 / 150	▼1	Extra-parliamentary
2025	Tofik Dibi	List	40,360	0.38	0 / 150	Steady	Extra-parliamentary

=== Municipal ===
Election	Municipality	Lead candidate	Votes	%	Seats	+/–
2018	Amsterdam	Sylvana Simons	6,571	1.9 (#12)	1 / 45	New
2022	Almere	Georgine Panhuijsen	3,225	5.0 (#9)	2 / 45	New
2022	Amsterdam	Jazie Veldhuyzen	21,441	6.8 (#5)	3 / 45 (Note: The party currently holds 0 seats in the Amsterdam municipal council after all members split off.)	▲2
2022	Delft	Jeanette Chedda	883	2.1 (#12)	0 / 39	New
2022	Rotterdam	Mieke Megawati Vlasblom	8,094	4.1 (#9)	2 / 45	New
2022	Utrecht	Stevie Nolten	5,403	3.4 (#11)	1 / 45	New

== See also ==
- List of left-wing political parties
- List of political parties in the Netherlands
