= Kick Out Zwarte Piet =

Dutch activist organization

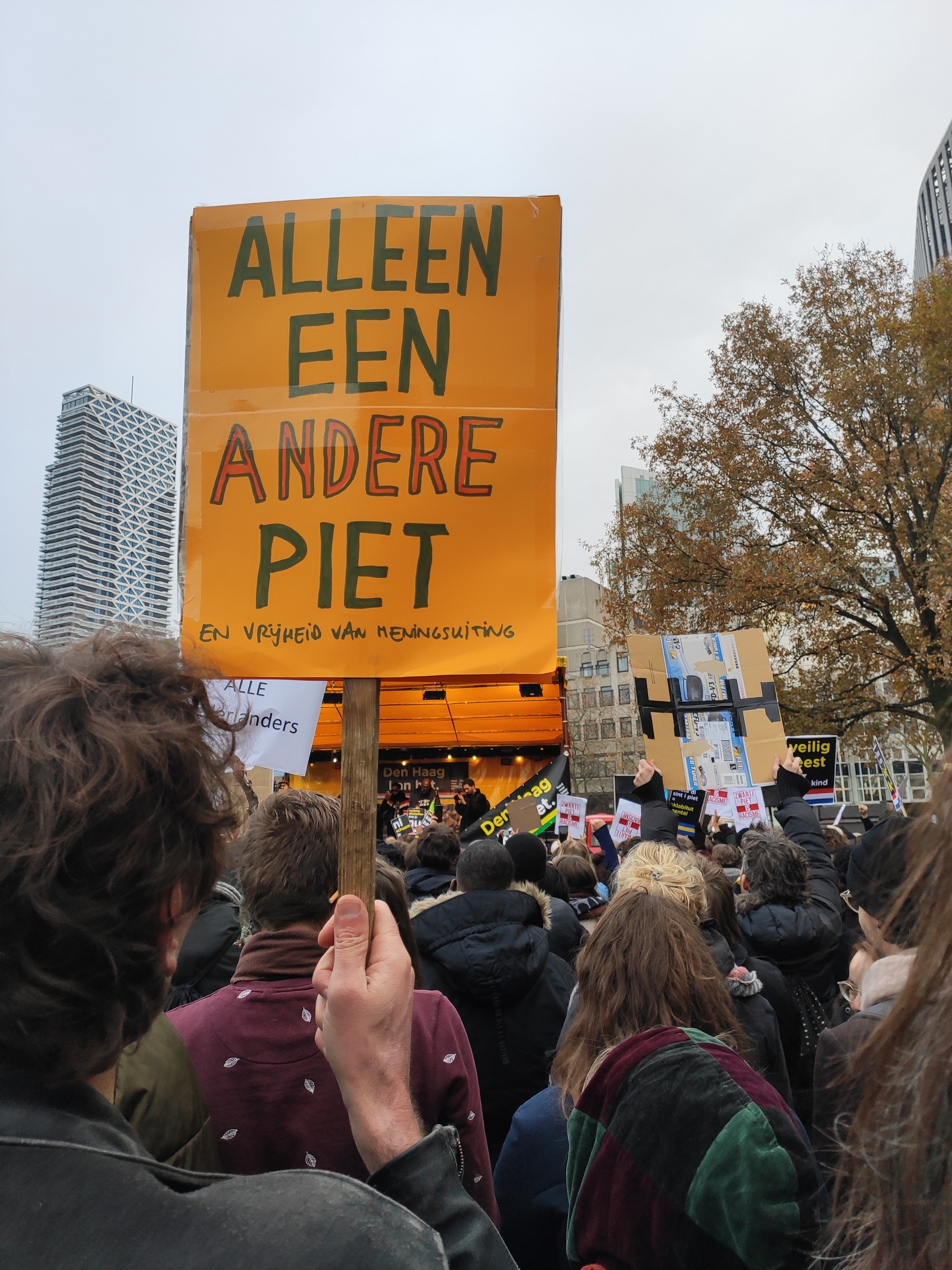
Activists at a KOZP protest in The Hague in 2019. The sign in the foreground reads: Alleen een andere Piet en vrijheid van meningsuiting. (in English: "Only another Pete and freedom of speech".)

Kick Out Zwarte Piet (KOZP) is a Dutch organization that campaigns against the Zwarte Piet character (IPA: [ˈzʋɑrtə ˈpit], in English: Black Pete, or Black Peter) in the culture of the Low Countries. Zwarte Piet is traditionally part of the annual Christian feast of Sinterklaasavond (in English: "St. Nicholas' Eve") in the Netherlands, Belgium, some territories of the former Dutch Empire and the Dutch diaspora on the evening of 5 December in the Netherlands and 6 December in Belgium. Saint Nicholas Day is also celebrated in the Balkans, Eastern Europe, Central Europe and the Middle East. In the folklore of the Low Countries, Zwarte Piet is portrayed as the dark-skinned Spanish Moor companion to Sinterklaas.

The character of Zwarte Piet is controversial, as depictions traditionally involve white actors in blackface. Because of this, efforts are made by KOZP and some members of the Dutch public in the form of meetings and protests to abolish Zwarte Piet from Sinterklaasavond, often met by opposition from traditionalists who generally argue that Zwarte Piet represents Dutch tradition and not racism.

== Objective ==
Kick Out Zwarte Piet argue that Zwarte Piet glorifies the history of Dutch colonialism and slavery. The action group advocates a Sinterklaas event featuring only Roetpieten (in English: "Sooty Petes") or other solutions where possible references to racial characteristics do not play a role. According to KOZP, roles played by Roetpiet would support the celebration of Sinterklaas and no longer refer to a discriminating stereotypical appearance or behavior of dark-skinned people.

== History ==
KOZP was founded in 2014 via the campaign "Zwarte Piet is Racisme" (an initiative of the Nederland Wordt Beter foundation), "Stop Blackface" and "Zwarte Piet Niet". Zwarte Piet is Racisme was a 2012 art project by poet, artist and activist Quinsy Gario and poet and activist Jerry Afriyie. Gario has not been involved in the campaign since. Afriyie is the foreman of KOZP. He stated that he loved Sinterklaas and the processions as a child.

KOZP first appeared just before the arrival of Sinterklaas in Meppel in 2015.

Some anti-Zwarte Piet activists stated that KOZP are too soft. They believe that change is too slow and emphasize more and harder actions.

On 11 November 2019, KOZP accused police of failing to protect its members' safety after four people were arrested for violently breaking up a meeting.

On 20 June 2020, Jerry Afriyie and members of his family were the recipients of a death threat letter signed "PEGIDA AFD. NOORD" (in English: Pegida Division North), however Pegida Netherlands (the Dutch branch of the German far-right, anti-Islam movement Pegida) have distanced themselves from the letter. An Amsterdam police spokesperson stated that they are aware of the threat, that they have been in contact with Afriyie and that he has filed a complaint. Amsterdam police have begun investigating who the sender is and stated that they take the matter very seriously.

== Threat assessment controversy ==
According to an article by Robert Toret in the Dutch regional newspaper Leidsch Dagblad, Jerry Afriyie stated at a 2016 KOZP meeting in Leiden that there are several strategies: "De één gaat zingen op de Dam, de ander gaat met een knuppel naar een intocht. Ik vind dat ze allebei de ruimte moeten krijgen." (in English: "One goes singing at the Dam, the other goes to a procession with a bat. I think that they should both be given space.") However, this statement was denied by Jerry Afriyie.

In 2017, KOZP was listed as an "extreme left-wing anti-racist action group" under the heading "Extremisme" in the "Dreigingsbeeld Terrorisme Nederland" (DTN) (in English: Terrorist Threat Assessment Netherlands), which is being prepared by the security services. National Coordinator for Security and Counter-terrorism Dick Schoof emphasized that the group had not used violence. Schoof did not rule out the possibility that the movement was potentially extremist and violent. Following a complaint from KOZP, as of 2019 the group would be labeled as an activist organization that strives to achieve its goals within the limits of the law and not as a left-wing extremist or terrorist organization. KOZP was no longer included in later versions of the DTN but the Zwarte Piet discussion is generally mentioned under the heading "Polarisatie" (in English: polarization), with the blockade on the A7 motorway being mentioned in 2018.

== See also ==
- Racism in Europe
- Jim Crow (character)
