= The Bus (TV series) =

Reality television show format

The Bus is a reality television show created by Endemol, in which a group of people live together in a large and luxury bus, isolated from the outside world but continuously watched by television cameras. Each series lasts for around three months. The contestants try to win a cash prize by avoiding periodic evictions from the bus. The first The Bus broadcast was in the Netherlands in 2000 on the SBS6 TV channel.

== The Bus around the world ==
Country	Local title	Network	Winners	Main presenters
Benelux	De Bus	VT4; SBS6	Season 1, 2000: Hans Kreeft	Inge Moerenhout; Ton van Royen
Brazil	Busão do Brasil	Band	Season 1, 2010: Mário Remo	Edgard Piccoli (Season 1)
Estonia	Buss	Kanal 2	Season 1, 2005: Mari Pennaste	Maarit Kõrgekivi (Season 1)
Netherlands	De Bus	SBS6	Season 1, 2000: Antonette Sterrenburg	Sylvana Simons (Season 1)
Spain	El Bus	Antena 3	Season 1, 2000: Sonia Oliván	Inés Ballester (Season 1)

== See also ==
- List of television show franchises
