= Anja Meulenbelt =

Dutch writer and politician (born 1945)

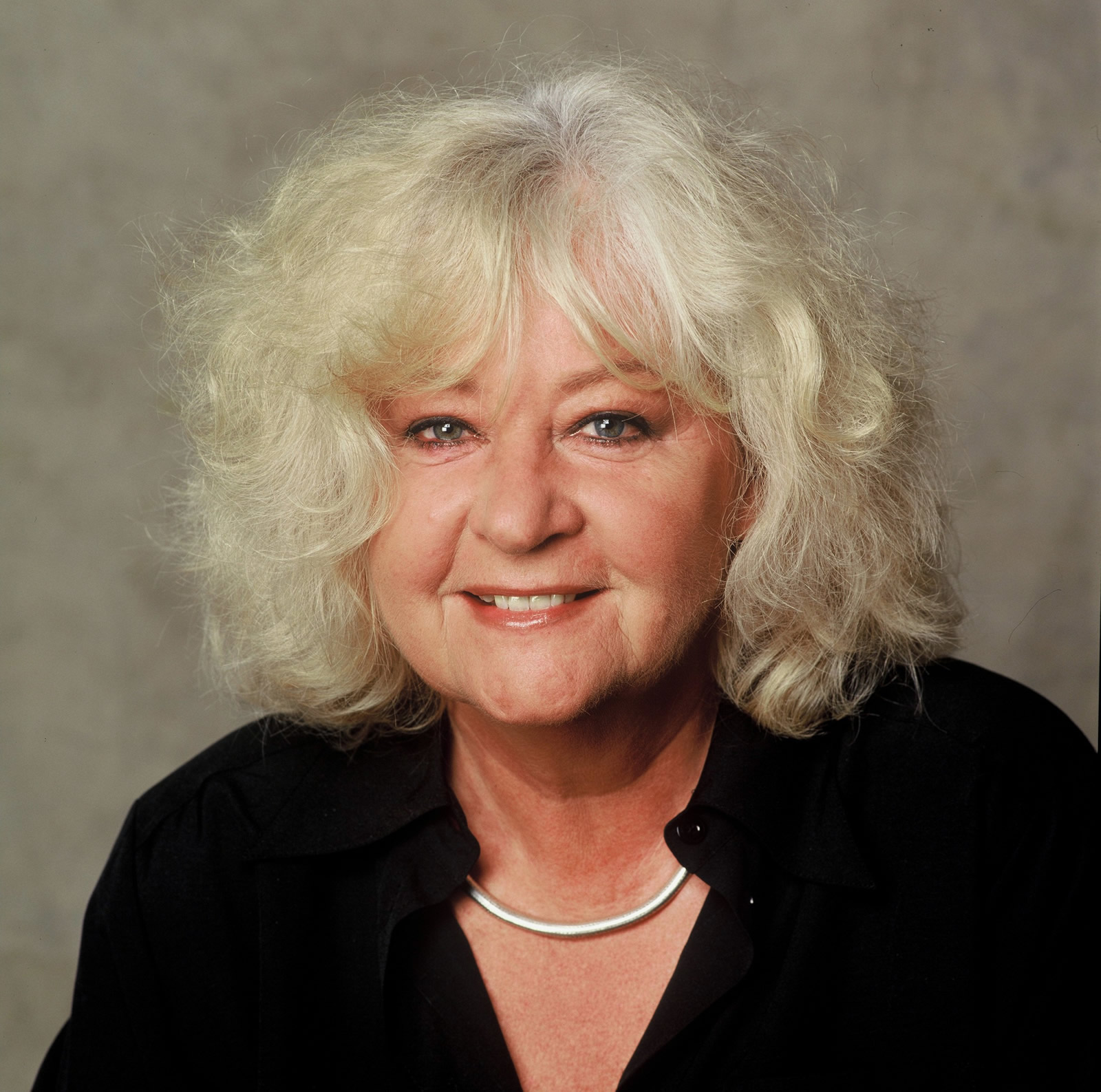
- Born: 6 January 1945 (age 81); Utrecht, Netherlands
- Education: Andragogy (University of Amsterdam, 1972-1977)
- Children: 1 son
- Anja Meulenbelt's voice Recorded May 2017
- Website: anjameulenbelt.nl

Anja Henriëtte Meulenbelt (born 6 January 1945) is a Dutch writer and former politician of the Socialist Party (SP).

She wrote De Schaamte Voorbij ('The Shame is Over'), published in 1976, which was a piece of second-wave feminist writing in the Netherlands. The novel was confessional in tone, and made the connection between the body and language politics overt. She also wrote several books about the Palestinians and the Israeli–Palestinian conflict.

She was a Senator from 2003 to 2011. In August 2014, Meulenbelt terminated her membership of the SP, because she felt the party did not speak out enough against Israel's military actions in the Gaza Strip.

== Works (in Dutch) ==
- Vrouwen in praatgroepen. Weten hoe het voelt (1974)
- Feminisme en socialisme. Een inleiding (1975) ISBN 90-6012-288-7
- De schaamte voorbij (1976) ISBN 90-5226-461-9
- Wat is feminisme (1981) ISBN 90-6328-057-2
- Kleine voeten, grote voeten: Vrouwen in China, een indruk (1982) ISBN 90-6328-079-3
- Brood en rozen. Artikelen 1975-1982 (1983) ISBN 90-6328-098-X
- Mannen, wat is er met jullie gebeurd? (1984, with Marjo van Soest ISBN 90-6328-116-1
- De schillen van de ui. Socialisatie: hoe zijn we vrouwen en mannen geworden (1984) ISBN 90-6328-115-3
- Alba (1984; roman) ISBN 90-6012-618-1
- Een kleine moeite (1985; roman) ISBN 90-6012-656-4
- De ziekte bestrijden, niet de patiënt: Over seksisme, racisme en klassisme (1985) ISBN 90-6012-644-0
- De bewondering (1987; roman) ISBN 90-6012-743-9
- Vanille en andere smaken. Vrouwen en seksualiteit (1988) ISBN 90-254-6737-7
- Geliefde ramp. Over Sara en andere katten (1989) ISBN 90-6012-837-0
- Casablanca, of De onmogelijkheden van de heteroseksuele liefde (1990) ISBN 90-6012-646-7
- Emancipatie en overspel. Ontrouw, intimiteit, modern moederschap, rivaliteit, mannen als lustobject, als hoerenlopers, als daders en slachtoffers (1993) ISBN 90-6012-896-6
- Blessuretijd (roman; 1994) ISBN 90-5515-009-6
- Dagen in Gaza (1995) ISBN 90-5515-066-5
- Je broer en ik (1996; roman) ISBN 90-5515-107-6
- Chodorow en verder. Over de psychopolitiek van sekse (1997) ISBN 90-5515-129-7
- Zoals het oog de regenboog. Overleven na geweld (1999) ISBN 90-5515-208-0
- Het beroofde land (2000) ISBN 90-5515-194-7
- De tweede intifada (2001) ISBN 90-5515-305-2, sequel to: Het beroofde land
- Een spiegel liegt niet. Andere stemmen uit Israël (2002) ISBN 90-5460-086-1. Editor - collection of texts by Israeli intellectuals and activists about the Israeli–Palestinian conflict
- Habibi, habibi. Gaza-dagboek (2004) ISBN 90-76988-41-2
- Oorlog als er vrede dreigt. Israël en 'het Palestijnse probleem' (2010) ISBN 978-90-263-2290-7
- Het jawoord (2013)
- Kwart over Gaza. Over zionisme, antisemitisme en islamofobie (2015) ISBN 978-94-91921-10-0
- Het F-boek. Hedendaags Feminisme in Woord en Beeld (2015, with Renée Römkens) ISBN 978-90-00-34502-1
- Het verschil. Zeventien actuele kwesties bekeken vanuit het feminisme (2016) ISBN 978-90-00-35018-6
- Feminisme. Terug van nooit weggeweest (2017) ISBN 978-94-6267-105-8
- Brood en rozen. Over klasse en identiteit (2019, ISBN 978-94-6267-159-1)
- Er is een land waar alleenstaande moeders willen wonen (2021, ISBN 978-90-82959-43-7, with Eva Yoo Ri Brussaard, published by 'Single Super Mom')
- Klassenstrijd in deze tijd. Een pleidooi voor vernieuwing (2022) ISBN 978-94-92734-21-1
- Alle moeders werken al. Pleidooi voor een zorgzame samenleving (2022) ISBN 978-94-6249-887-7

== Electoral history ==
A (possibly incomplete) overview of Dutch elections Meulenbelt participated in
Election	Party	Candidate number	Votes
2003 Dutch Senate election	Socialist Party		
2007 Dutch Senate election	Socialist Party		
2017 Dutch general election	Artikel 1	20	145
2018 Dutch municipal elections in Amsterdam	BIJ1	12	54
2022 Dutch municipal elections in Amsterdam	BIJ1	21	102
