= Party for Sports =

Party for Sports PartijvdSport
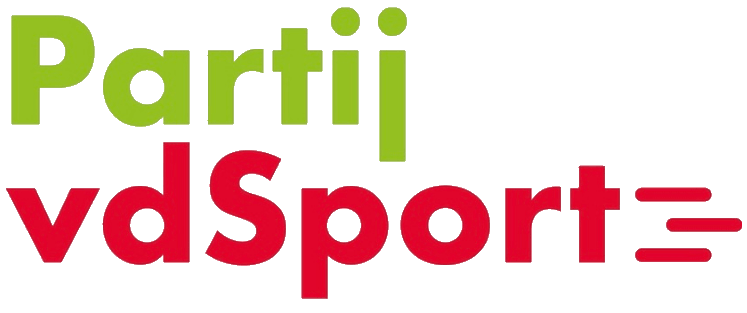
- Abbreviation: PvdS
- Leader: Anne Marie van Duivenboden
- Chairperson: Maurice Ambaum
- Founder: Maurice Ambaum; Ronald Wouters
- Founded: 2021
- Headquarters: Steyl, Netherlands
- Ideology: Health promotion
- Colors: Green; Red
- Municipal council of Olst-Wijhe: 1 / 17

Website
- partijvdsport.nl

Party for Sports (Dutch: PartijvdSport, PvdS) is a political party in the Netherlands. It has a focus on sports, health, and a healthy lifestyle.

The Dutch name of the party, PartijvdSport, is not an abbreviation but the official name of the party. The letters 'vd' in the party name can refer to either 'of the' (van de) or 'for the' (voor de) sport.

== History ==
The party was founded in 2021 by Ronald Wouters and Maurice Ambaum. The party was founded in response to the problems surrounding the COVID-19 pandemic in the Netherlands, which, according to the party, showed that there was insufficient structural attention from politics for the promotion of sport and health. When the party was founded, it was made clear that the intention was to participate in both local and national elections, including the 2023 provincial elections and the 2023 House of Representatives elections, although they did not participate in the former.

The first elections the party participated in were the municipal reorganization elections in the municipality Maashorst, where the party received 236 votes, amounting to 36,7% of the quota and therefore did not receive a seat. In the 2022 municipal elections in the municipality of Olst-Wijhe, the party ultimately ended up with a residual seat on the council.

The party participated in 11 of the 20 electoral districts during the 2023 House of Representatives elections, with Anne Marie van Duivenboden as lead candidate. The party did not receive enough votes to obtain a seat.

== Ideology ==
The party's positions largely concern promoting public health. The party focuses, among other things, on healthier food, more sport and exercise, and combating smoking.

== Election results ==
=== House of Representatives ===
Election	Lead candidate	Votes	%	Seats	+/–	Government
2023	Annemarie van Duivenboden	3,966	0.04 (#25)	0 / 150	New	Extra-parliamentary

=== Municipal elections ===
Election year	Municipal council				
Election year	Municipality	Votes	%	# of overall seats won	+/−
2021	Maashorst	236	1.18%	0 / 31	New
2022	Olst-Wijhe	369	4.43%	1 / 17	▲1
