= Edson Olf =

Dutch politician (born 1986)

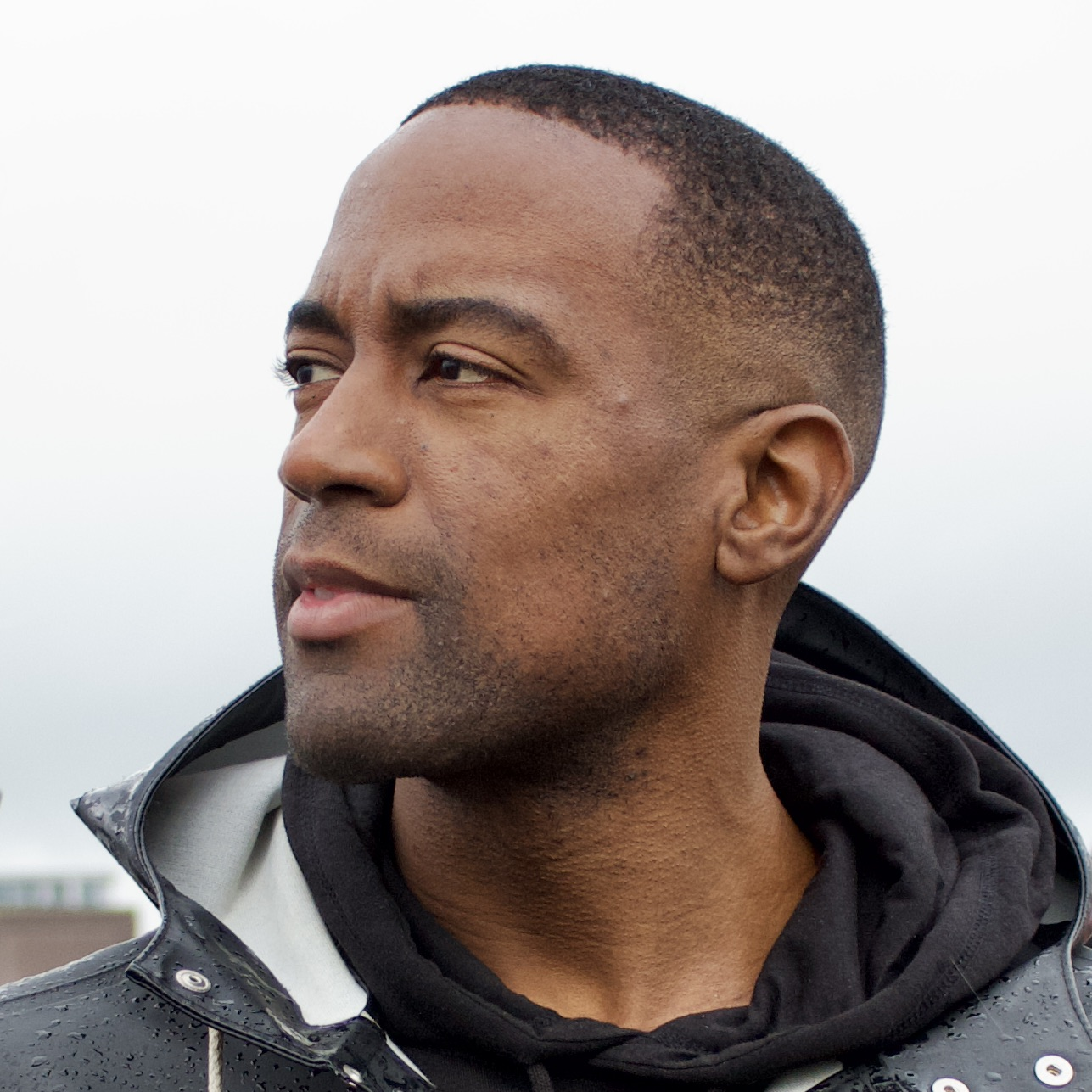
- Olf in 2023

Party leader of BIJ1
- Incumbent
- Assumed office 16 September 2023
- Preceded by: Sylvana Simons

Personal details
- Born: 1986 (age 39–40) Paramaribo, Suriname
- Party: BIJ1
- Occupation: Politician; consultant

E.M. (Edson) Olf (born 1986) is a Dutch politician for left-wing party BIJ1. He has been party leader of BIJ1 since 16 September 2023. Currently living in Rotterdam, Olf works as a consultant. He is also deputy chairman of the Rotterdam Cool-Scheepvaartkwartier-Stadsdriehoek district council.

== Electoral history ==
Electoral history of Edson Olf
Year	Body	Party	Pos.	Votes	Result		Ref.
Year	Body	Party	Pos.	Votes	Party seats	Individual	Ref.
2023	House of Representatives	BIJ1	1	16,906	0	Lost	

Party political offices
Preceded by Sylvana Simons	Leader of BIJ1; 2023–present	Incumbent
