= Nieuwspoort =

- Website: nieuwspoort.nl

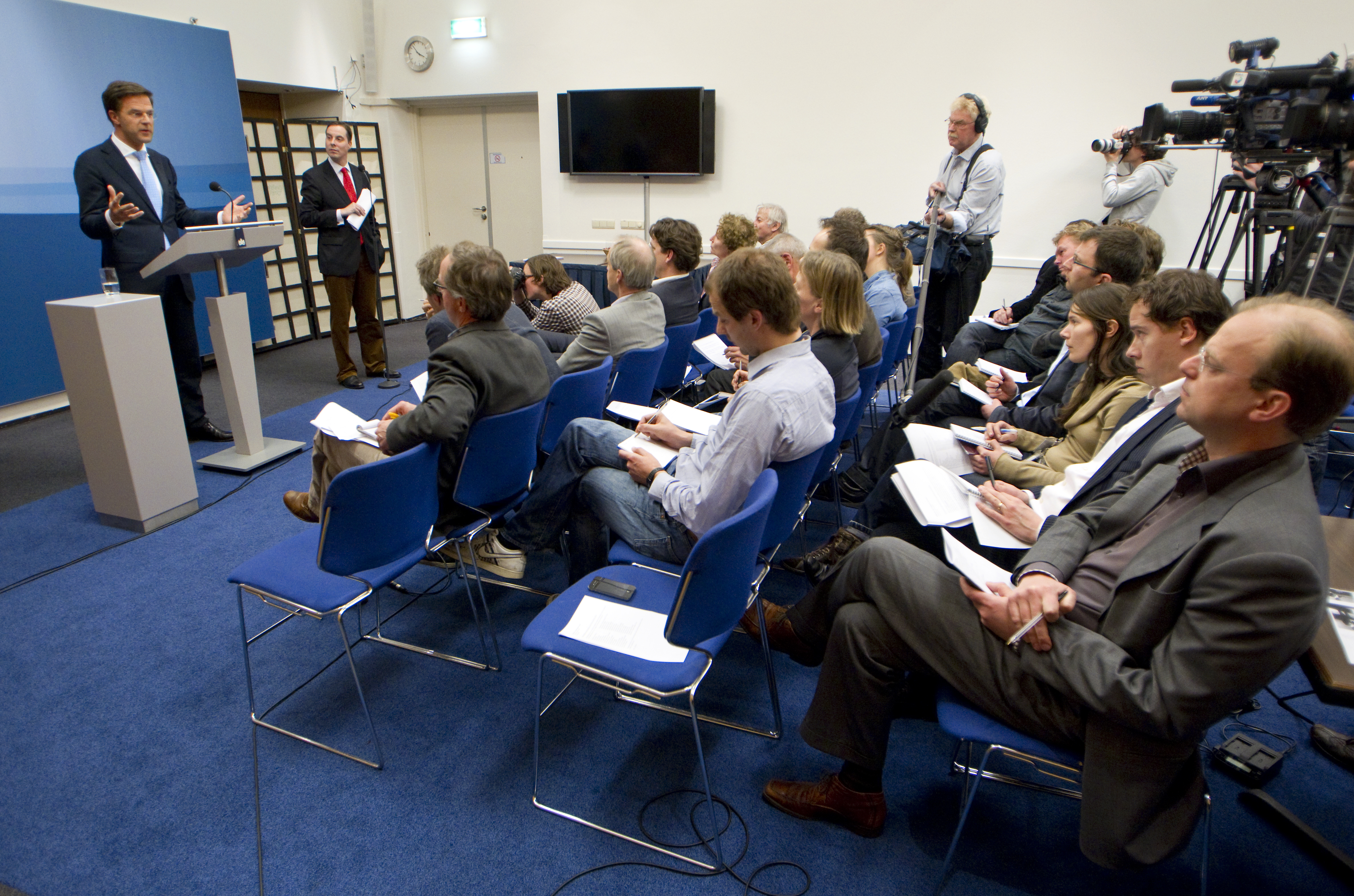
Prime Minister Mark Rutte in front of the Nieuwspoort journalists

The Stichting Internationaal perscentrum Nieuwspoort (lit. 'International press centre News gate') is an informal and exclusive meeting place for Dutch politicians, lobbyists, spokespersons and journalists in The Hague.

== History ==
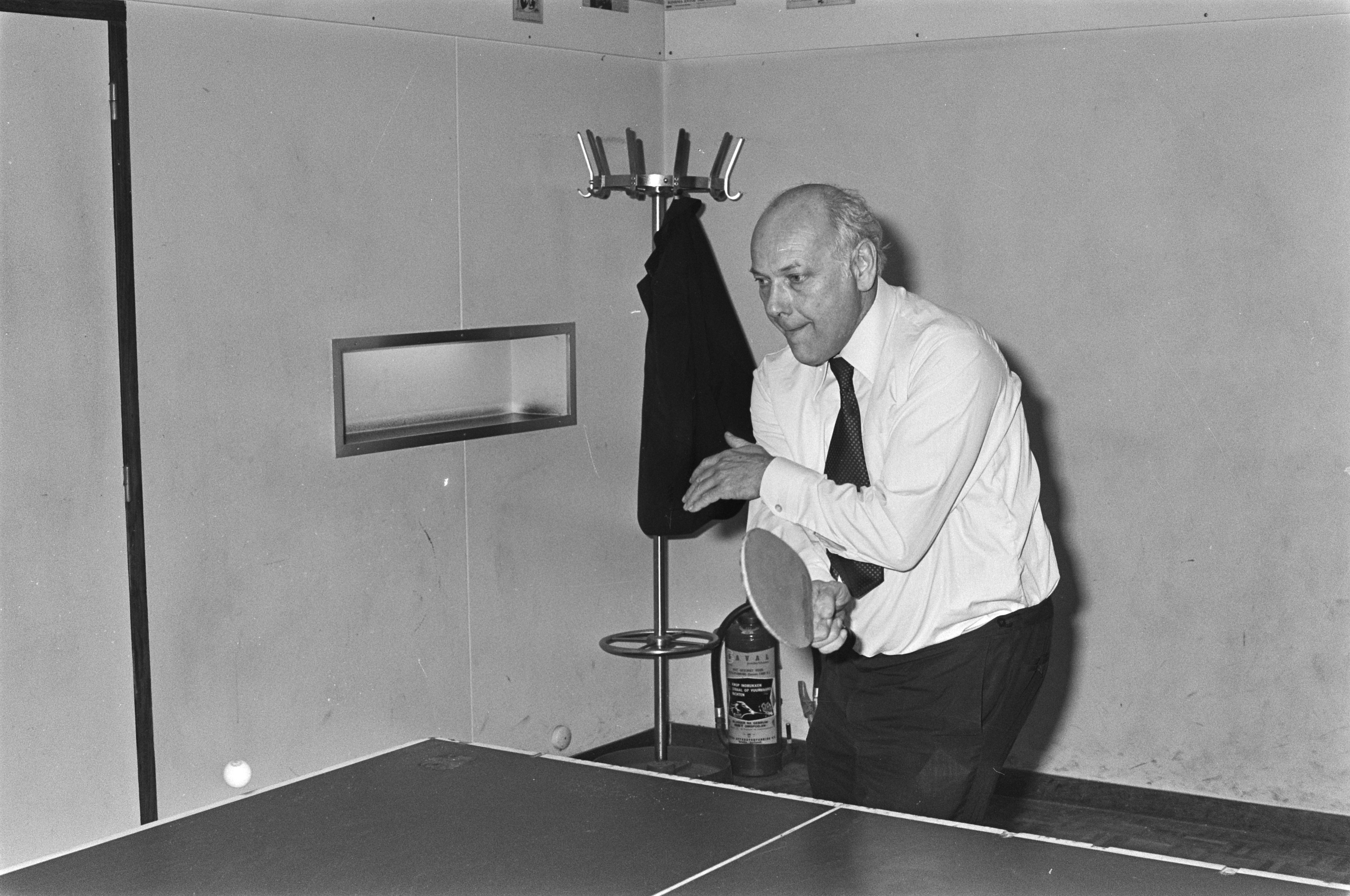
Prime Minister Joop den Uyl playing table tennis in Nieuwspoort in March 1977.

Around 1959, there were complaints about the lack of facilities for the press and the functioning of the Dutch government's information apparatus. In an effort to improve this, some people wanted to found a press centre. With the financial support for the business community, a building was found at Hofcingel 12, close to the Binnenhof. It had a direct passage to the House of Representatives. The press centre was opened in 1962 by minister Jo Cals. Nieuwspoort had a difficult financial start, but grew from a revenue of 28.000 guilder in 1962 to half a million in 1977. In 1969, Nieuwspoort was enlarged and improved, again paid for by the business community.

In 1992, Nieuwspoort moved from Hofcingel 12 to Lange Poten, in a part of the enlarged building of the House of Representatives. It was opened on 30 November 1992 by Queen Beatrix.

Because of the 2021–present Binnenhof renovation, Nieuwspoort temporarily relocated along with the House of Representatives to the Bezuidenhoutseweg 67 in The Hague.

== Usage ==
Nieuwspoort has a rule called the Nieuwspoortcode, which like the Chatham House Rule allows those present to use information they gathered there, but not attribute to the people or the place.

Since 1970 the weekly press conference by the Prime Minister is held in Nieuwspoort. Only between 2007 and 2010, under Prime Minister Jan Peter Balkenende, the weekly press conference was held elsewhere.

== Organisation ==
Nieuwspoort is a foundation and has no members. It has a board, who decides who is allowed to enter. Nearly 2,200 people had access in 2023.
