= Issue ownership =

Political science concept

Issue ownership is a concept in political science that states that a political party owns an issue if it is perceived by voters as the most competent party to solve a particular problem. According to the concept, a party does better if issues they own play a major role in the election campaign.

The concept was first introduced in 1983 in the book Explaining and predicting elections. The concept was later elaborated and popularized by the article "Issue Ownership in Presidential Elections, with a 1980 Case Study" by John Petrocik in 1996.

== Definition and causes ==
Although there is no current consensus on the exact definition of issue ownership, various political scientists have dedicated their work to understand its meaning and implications. Political scientist Rune Stubager defines issue ownership as "the perception in a voter’s mind that a specific party over the long term is most competent at handling—in the sense of delivering desired outputs on—a given issue".

Some older definitions, including Petrocik's, have a broader definition of issue ownership which includes short-term perception. This perception is the result of how governing parties are perceived to have handled issues. If these results were disappointing, their competence in the eyes of voters declines. Opposition parties can benefit from this decline and become short-term owner of an issue. Left-wing parties for example are generally owner of the issue unemployment but lose ownership when unemployment has risen while they were in government.

Kevin K Banda defines issue ownership theory as the notion that candidates should focus on the issues associated with their parties and avoid issues owned by an opposing party. When candidates do encroach on issues owned by an opposing party, Banda defines this as the act of “trespassing”. Research suggests that candidates’ trespassing can negatively impact candidacies. However, other research indicates that trespassing can also assist candidates in winning elections by appealing to politically moderate citizens.

== Examples per country ==
=== Netherlands ===
- Christian Democratic Appeal: Norms and values
- Party for Freedom: Immigration
- GreenLeft: Environment/Climate
- People's Party for Freedom and Democracy: Entrepreneurship

=== United States ===
- Republican Party: Crime, military, taxes, moral values, foreign policy
- Democratic Party: Welfare state, healthcare, and education
