= Sylvana Simons =

Dutch presenter and politician (born 1971)

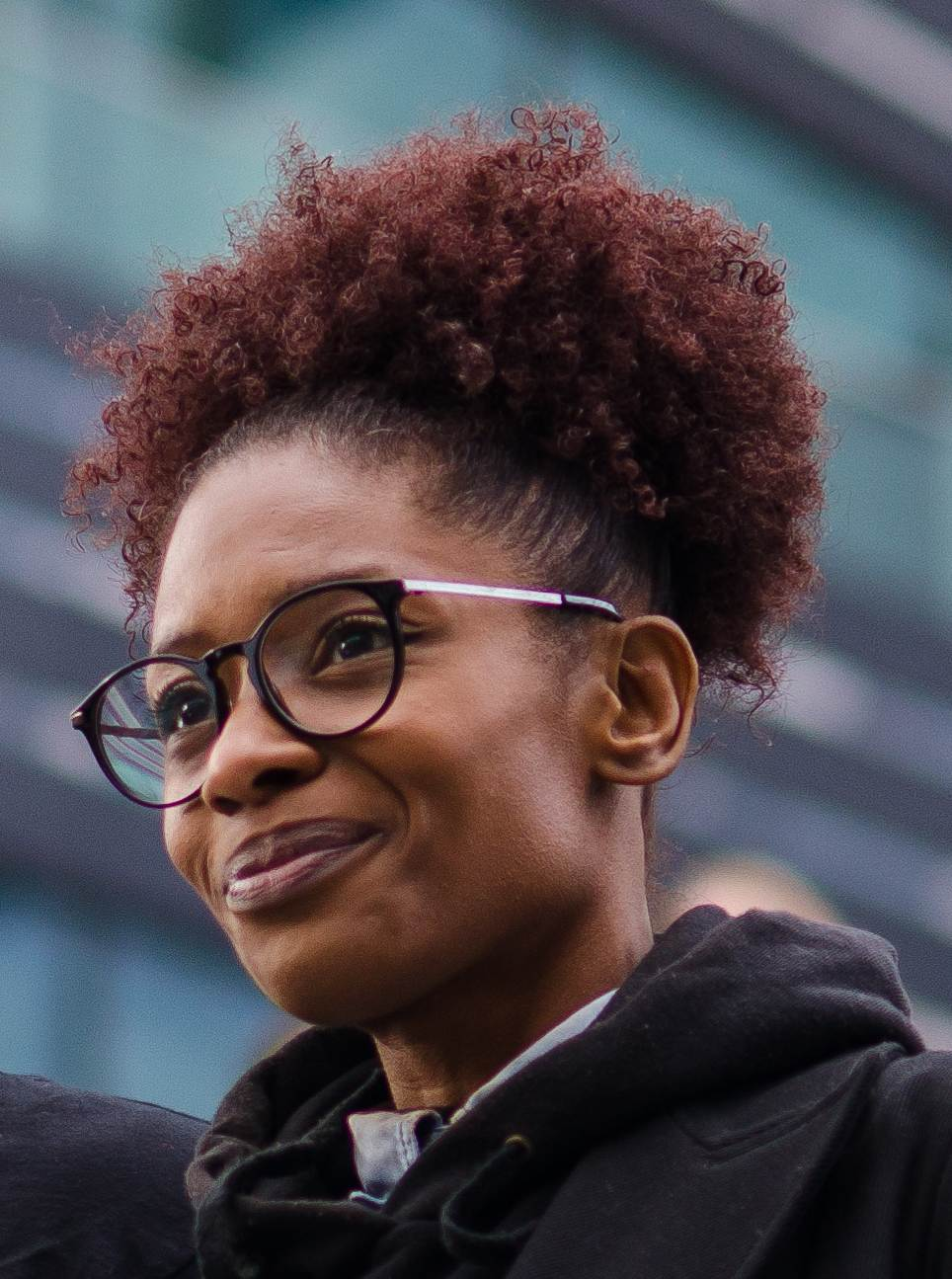
- Simons in 2020

Member of the House of Representatives
- In office 31 March 2021 – 5 December 2023

Member of the Amsterdam municipal council
- In office 29 March 2018 – 5 November 2020
- Succeeded by: Jazie Veldhuyzen

Personal details
- Born: Silvana Hildegard Simons; 31 January 1971 (age 55) Paramaribo, Suriname
- Party: BIJ1 (Note: Known as Artikel 1 (Article 1) until 2017.) (2016–present)
- Other party: DENK (2016)
- Spouse: Frank van Hoorn (m. 2003; div. 2006)
- Children: 2
- Relatives: Kenneth Leeuwin (half-brother)
- Occupation: Politician; television presenter; VJ; dancer
- Known for: Dancing with the Stars, De bus, TV makelaar

Silvana Hildegard "Sylvana" Simons (Note: Simons's first name is officially spelled with an "i", but she decided to take on a more international spelling in primary school.) (Dutch pronunciation: [sɪlˈvaːnaː ˈsimɔns]; born 31 January 1971) is a Surinamese-born Dutch politician and former television presenter. She served as a member of the House of Representatives between 2021 and 2023 on behalf of BIJ1, an egalitarian anti-racist party founded by Simons in 2016.

She was born in Suriname and moved to the Netherlands while an infant. She was a dancer in the Amsterdam nightlife scene before becoming a VJ for the new music channel TMF in 1995. Simons left four years later to join SBS Broadcasting, where she presented reality television series De bus (2000). She subsequently spent almost a decade at RTL Nederland, hosting the first few seasons of TV makelaar (2001–05) about home buying and the Saturday evening show Dancing with the Stars (2005–07). Starting in 2009, Simons worked some years in public broadcasting as a radio presenter on Radio 6 and for the association NPS.

She transitioned to politics in 2016, when she joined minority rights party DENK. Her career change followed her questioning of a term which she deemed racially insensitive during talk show De wereld draait door the previous year. Her speaking out against institutional racism – and especially Sinterklaas's blackfaced companion Zwarte Piet – caused fierce criticism on social media platforms and racist remarks and threats. Simons left DENK after seven months to establish her own political party called Artikel 1, which was later renamed BIJ1. She did not win a seat in the 2017 general election, but she was elected to the Amsterdam municipal council the following year. Simons became the first black parliamentary leader in Dutch history following her election to the House of Representatives in 2021.

== Early life and education ==
Simons was born on 31 January 1971 in the Surinamese capital of Paramaribo to Wilfred Hugo Leeuwin (born 1928) and Roline Yvonne Kerk (born 1945). She was raised without her siblings even though her father and her mother had fifteen children and one child, respectively, from previous relationships. The family came to the Netherlands when Simons was aged one and a half and lived in the Amsterdam neighborhoods Kinkerbuurt and Osdorp. She moved to the North Holland city of Hoorn another ten years later, growing up in its neighborhood Grote Waal. Her father worked as a bookkeeper for an insurance company, while her mother was employed by IBM. In her childhood, Simons rode horses and danced. She had started dancing lessons at the age of seven and later did preparatory training in Amsterdam for the ballet academy, dreaming of becoming the first black soloist of the Dutch National Ballet. She went to the secondary school RSG West-Friesland, initially studying at vwo level, but she later switched to havo.

At the age of fourteen, Simons moved out of her parents's house after her father had told her to leave if she did not want to abide by his rules. At first, she stayed at her half-sister in Amsterdam, but she later spent time in a youth shelter and in lodgings with assistance. During that period, she attended the Amsterdams Lyceum and the Spinoza Lyceum, among others, but never graduated. Simons also went to the Lucias Marthas Institute For Performing Arts and the Hairdressing Academy, finishing neither school. When she was twenty years old, she was admitted to the show and musical department of the Amsterdam University of the Arts, but she dropped out shortly after the start of the program because of her first pregnancy.

== Entertainment career ==
=== Dancing and early television career (1989–2000) ===
Simons began her career in 1989 as a dancer for the Amsterdam nightclub iT and during performances of musicians such as CB Milton and Grace Jones. She went on tour with 2 Brothers on the 4th Floor and performed as backing for UB40 at the World Liberty Concert in Arnhem. Simons also appeared in commercials for Pepsi, Philips, and Victoria Vesta. She did a screen test for radio and television executive Lex Harding in 1992 after he had seen her dance in the Veronica music program Countdown. Harding asked her a few years later to join the new musical channel TMF. Simons accepted and started as VJ and interviewer at its launch in May 1995. She later gave up dancing to focus on her television career. On TMF, Simons presented the show Sylvana's Soul, which helped popularize R&B in the Netherlands and earned her the nickname "Dutch Queen of R&B". She also recorded the single "Get Close To You" with fellow VJs Fabienne de Vries, Bridget Maasland, and Isabelle Brinkman as part of the music group The Magnificent Four. It reached position sixteen in the Dutch Top 40 and spent five weeks in that chart, but Simons has told that she was unable to sing and was mostly responsible for backing vocals. She became a board member of Mixt, a foundation attempting to combat racism through music and the organizer of the annual pop festival Racism Beat It, in early 1999.

Simons left TMF in 1999 and joined SBS Broadcasting later that year, presenting Sexquiz on the beach, a new weekly couples quiz involving stripping candidates, starting in September. She also hosted the program Politie door 't lint (Police snapping) and the first season of reality competition De bus, which was similar to Big Brother and which took place in a bus. Next to her job at SBS, Simons presented a radio show on Radio 538, and she wrote columns for the Dutch edition of Playboy and for the short-lived More! Magazine. The latter was launched by TMF in May 1999 with an issue featuring Simons and two of her colleagues naked on the cover.

=== RTL Nederland (2000–09) ===
She abandoned SBS Broadcasting in favor of RTL Nederland – then called Holland Media Group – and replaced Beau van Erven Dorens as host of the afternoon news magazine RTL Live in September 2000. The show was anchored by Minoesch Jorissen on Mondays and Tuesdays and by Simons on Wednesdays and Thursdays. RTL Live was canceled in May of the following year as a result of dwindling ratings. In the meantime, Simons had also moved her column from Playboy to Veronica Magazine, where it would remain until 2002, and had left her radio show at Radio 538 to work for Noordzee FM in March 2001. She had two shows on that station, Sylvana and Sylvana's Soul, which were broadcast on Friday and Saturday evenings, respectively.

Simons started presenting her second show for RTL Nederland in November 2001, when TV makelaar (TV real estate agent) debuted. She was the sole host of the program, in which she assisted people in their search for a new home. It was renewed for several new seasons. At the same time, she co-presented the Monday evening show Met man en macht (With all his power), in which she and two other women interviewed male guests, in early 2002 and the program Je echte leeftijd (Your real age) with John Williams starting in May 2003. In the latter show, participants performed a RealAge test to find out how healthily they had been living. Simons also became the sole host of the book program Kaft (Cover), which first aired in April 2004. At TV makelaar, she was joined by Sybrand Niessen that same year. In 2005, she hosted the hidden camera show Bekend en bekeken (Famous and watched) and the quiz show De aanhouder wint (Slow and steady wins the race), based on the British Perseverance.

When television franchise Dancing with the Stars was brought to the Netherlands, Simons and Ron Brandsteder became the hosts. It debuted in August 2005. The first season finale was watched by 2.7 million people, and the show was nominated for a Golden Televizier Ring. It had been announced shortly before the first airing of Dancing with the Stars that Simons would be replaced by Marilou le Grand as host of TV makelaar. Besides, she became an ambassador of development aid agency Simavi around that time. She had already been in the same role at Stichting Pink Ribbon, which raises awareness of breast cancer, since 2004. Simons co-hosted the second season of Dancing with the Stars in the first half of 2006. She also presented three reality television shows later that year: Inpakken en wegdromen (Pack up and dream away), in which people went on their dream holiday; Opvolger gezocht (Successor wanted), in which she helped family business owners find their successor; and Hoe mooi is jouw straat? (How pretty is your street?), in which residents gave their street a makeover. Opvolger gezocht was canceled after three episodes due to low ratings. Simons presented a third season of Dancing with the Stars in early 2007 as well as the new RTL 5 reality show Ex Wives Club along with two other hosts. In December, she replaced Chazia Mourali as the presenter of Char, a show with American self-proclaimed psychic medium Char Margolis. Simons's last episode of Dancing with the Stars, a special to promote Plan International, aired days later.

It was reported in January 2008 that RTL Nederland had ended Simons's contract. Several new presenters had recently become part of the media network following the disbandment of TV channel Tien. She did continue hosting Char, and she co-hosted the daily RTL 4 program Nederland vertrekt (The Netherlands leaves) with a dozen other presenters in the summer of 2008 about people going on their holiday.

=== Radio 6 and other activities (2009–2015) ===
Simons started working for public broadcasting in 2009. She was given her own two-hour radio show in July called Sylvana's Choice, which aired on jazz station Radio 6 on weekdays, and she returned to television in September with a music-related TV show for NPS with the same name on Sunday afternoons on Nederland 2. Simons also started hosting the Saturday late evening talk show Sylvana in April 2010 on Nederland 1. Besides, she co-presented live television and radio coverage of the North Sea Jazz Festival, and she presented De zwarte lijst (The black list) about black music annually. News broadcaster NOS described her as the face of Radio 6. Sylvana's Choice was canceled in 2010, but she later received a Tuesday evening slot for a show called Soul & Jazz. She permanently left Radio 6 at the start of 2014, while remaining the host of North Sea Jazz Festival coverage and De zwarte lijst on television.

Next to her work for Radio 6, Simons started appearing as a recurring sidekick on talk show De wereld draait door in 2012, and she participated in the celebrity dancing contest Strictly Come Dancing, part of the same franchise as Dancing with the Stars. She was coupled with professional dancer Redmond Valk, who was later replaced by Aerjen Mooijweer because of an injury, and they were the season's runners-up. In late 2012, Simons presented the three-episode music series Puro 43 Music Sessions on RTL 8. She later also worked as a public speaking and personal leadership coach as co-owner of The House of Power. Simons participated in the theater tour LULverhalen (Dick stories), in which women talked about an either literal or figurative dick, in 2015. She was uninvited after she had talked about her opposition to Zwarte Piet – Sinterklaas's companion with blackface – during her first performance, causing some audience members to walk out of the performance.

== Political career ==
=== DENK (2016) ===
Simons has told that she decided to publicly speak out against institutional racism following a May 2015 incident and the reactions it had brought about, which included fierce criticism on social media: in an episode of De wereld draait door, presenter Martin Šimek used the word zwartjes (darkies) in a discussion about immigrants, causing Simons to question him on his usage of the word. The Algemeen Dagblad described 2015 as the year in which Simons had become the figurehead of the Dutch black community because of this event and her opposition to Zwarte Piet, whom she had protested at the national arrival of Sinterklaas in Meppel.

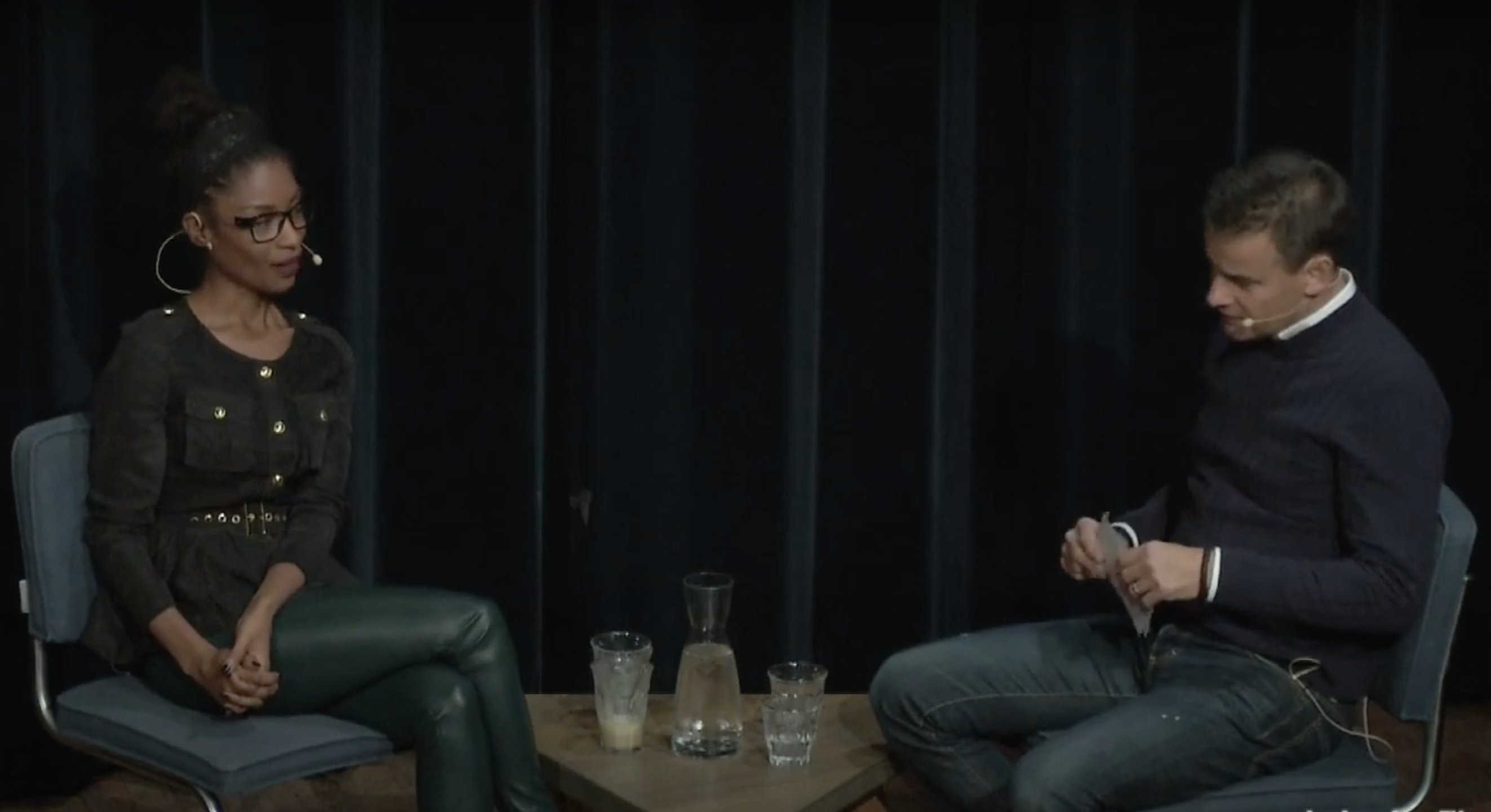
Simons while being interviewed by Wilfred Genee at De Balie in late 2016

She joined the left-wing minority rights party DENK on 18 May 2016, and it was simultaneously announced that she would run for member of the House of Representatives in the 2017 general election. DENK had been founded the year before by Turkish-born Dutch politicians Tunahan Kuzu and Selçuk Öztürk after they had left the Labour Party (Partij van de Arbeid, PvdA). Simons had been asked by Kuzu to join the party, and she also started serving as a communications advisor. Simons indicated an interest in anti-racism, decolonizing education, and empowering women.

Her announcement caused an avalanche of negative reactions on social media platforms, some of which referred to her Surinamese heritage and have been characterized as sexist or racist. This last category includes a Facebook event, which received tens of thousands of reactions, to wave Simons goodbye on Saint Nicholas Day – a reference to her opposition to Zwarte Piet. Prime Minister Mark Rutte and Minister Lodewijk Asscher condemned the reactions, calling them "disgusting", and Simons filed a police report. DENK announced in November 2016 that Simons was receiving protection following a threat video on Dailymotion. It combined the carnival song Oh Sylvana, the lyrics of which ask her to leave the country, by Rob van Daal with a picture of lynched African Americans, whose faces had been replaced by the one of Simons. 22 people were prosecuted in April 2017 for threats and insults including the creator of the video, leading to at least twenty of them receiving fines of up to €450 and community-service orders of up to 80 hours. (Note: One suspect was acquitted, while the case of a minor was decided on behind close doors.) The Public Prosecution Service stated that it did not have the resources to investigate all 40,000 comments that were identified as possibly illegal.

=== Own party and 2017 general election ===
Simons left DENK on 24 December 2016 to establish a party of her own called Artikel 1 to participate in the 2017 general election. Simons told that she wanted to belong to a party where she felt safe. She criticized DENK for being more concerned with celebrating media attention than with Simons's well-being when she received protection. Besides, she called the party's tactics polarizing, although she praised its goal of putting racism on the political agenda. She also said that there was not enough space at DENK to stand up for women's and LGBT rights because of its conservative supporters. She founded her new party, which was named after the constitution's article addressing equality before the law and prohibiting discrimination, with DENK's campaign manager Ian van der Kooye. Following her departure, DENK demanded €62,000 in damages from Simons for violating her employment contract's confidentiality clause and notice period. A court determined that DENK instead owed €5,000 in wages to Simons, which she later declined.

Ahead of the 2017 general election, Artikel 1 released its election program, in which it advocated single-payer healthcare, more female and immigrant cabinet members, a prohibition of Zwarte Piet in public spaces and on public television, an investigation into racial profiling, and a new national holiday to celebrate the abolition of slavery. Besides, the party pledged to strive for a world in which people could live and work wherever they want. Simons also co-wrote a book ahead of the election called Artikel 1: Een nieuwe politiek van gelijkwaardigheid (Article 1: A new politics of equality). Simons was the lead candidate of Artikel 1, and its party list contained more women than men, several people from the LGBT community, and both the youngest (18) and oldest (82) candidate of the election. The party received 0.27% of the vote in the March 2017 election – not enough for a seat in the House of Representatives.

Artikel 1 changed its name to BIJ1 (Together) in October after a court had ruled in June that the original name was too similar to that of Art.1, a discrimination expertise center. The party reiterated its commitment to be "against the current politics, which is full of hatred of Muslims, xenophobia, gender inequality, racism, socioeconomic exclusion, gender discrimination, division, exclusion, and exploitation".

=== Amsterdam municipal council (2018–2020) ===
In March 2018, Simons participated in the municipal election in Amsterdam as her party's lead candidate. She campaigned on a platform of economic justice, radical equality, and the importance of intersectionality, and she told that she wanted Amsterdam to maintain its inclusivity. She also refused to participate in a debate after learning that she would have to debate Annabel Nanninga (FVD) one-on-one. BIJ1 won one out of 45 seats in the election and Simons was sworn into the municipal council on 29 March. Her party was most popular in Amsterdam-Zuidoost. A documentary by Ingeborg Jansen about her campaign called Sylvana, demon of diva (Sylvana, demon or diva) premiered in November 2018 at the International Documentary Film Festival Amsterdam.

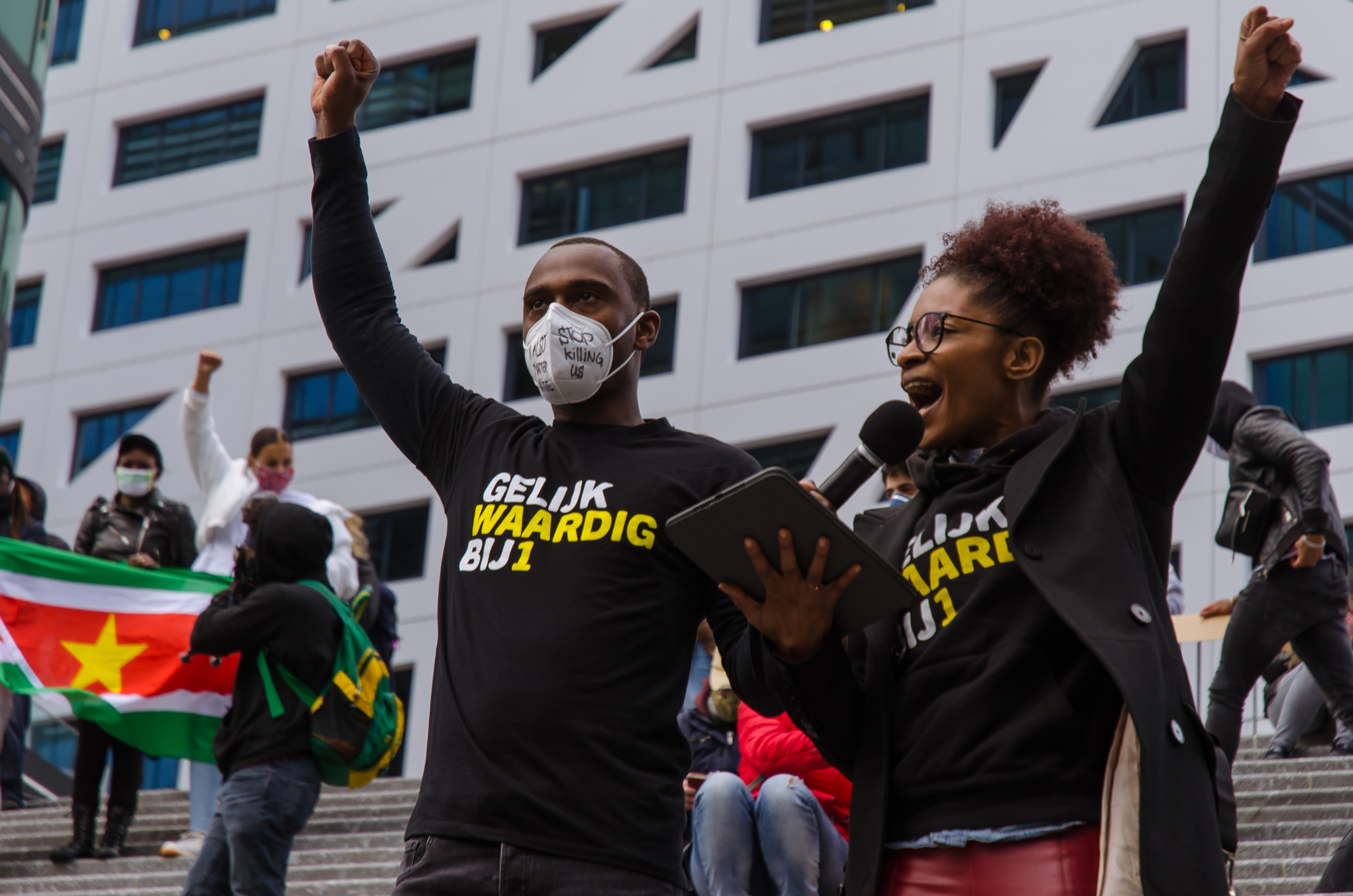
Simons at a June 2020 protest in Utrecht following the murder of George Floyd

Following the killing of Michael Fudge by police officers in February 2019, Simons requested a debate about the incident, which was described as a suicide by cop by the media. She said there had been excessive and unnecessary police violence and told that teenagers of color lived in an understandable fear of the police. Councilor Nicole Temmink (SP) said it would have been better to await the results of an investigation by the Rijksrecherche and Simons's comments were denounced by the rest of the council as well as by Mayor Femke Halsema. Simons also introduced motions to stop the municipality from fining homeless people for sleeping in the streets and to provide white privilege training for civil servants. Both passed the council. During the COVID-19 pandemic, she opposed plans of the municipal executive to raise local taxes, which would compensate for financial setbacks.

Newspaper Het Parool wrote that Simons was able to influence the council's agenda during her time in office despite having only one seat. According to the article, her party's competition with GroenLinks caused that party to focus more on identity politics in Amsterdam. Simons also played a role in getting the city to apologize for its history of slavery, in making the toilets of the Stopera unisex, and in getting the city to proclaim a climate crisis. She was awarded the Ribbius Peletier medal in 2021 by the province of North Holland for "being an example to the next generation of women" and for "publicly speaking out against a combination of sexism and racism".

=== 2021 general election and House of Representatives ===
In January 2020, BIJ1 signaled its intention to participate in the 2021 general election. Simons gave up her seat in the Amsterdam municipal council in early November to focus on the campaign. She called her party's platform the country's "most leftist, greenest, and most inclusive". It included a rise in the minimum wage to €14 per hour, the introduction of a Ministry of Equality, and "taking control of the economy's most important industries". She rejected capitalism, saying that it is based on the illusion of endless economic growth and that it leads to poverty, exploitation, and exclusion. According to Simons, an alternative economic system has to be designed and created with the participation of everyone. BIJ1 won one seat in the March 2021 general election causing Simons to be elected to the House of Representatives. She was sworn in on 31 March as the first black parliamentary leader in the House's history. Her election occurred amidst the anti-racism movement Black Lives Matter gaining traction following the murder of George Floyd in the United States by a police officer in May 2020.

In the House, Simons focused on education, the interior, economic affairs, climate policy, social affairs, and kingdom relations, while cooperating on many issues with Caroline van der Plas (BBB) and Liane den Haan (independent) because of their positions as fellow one-person caucus leaders. In the House, Simons has criticized the cabinet's strategy to fight the COVID-19 pandemic, saying that stricter measures such as longer and more stringent lockdowns were required to contain the virus. She filed a motion in July 2021 in which she argued that the cabinet's strategy of "letting [the virus] run wild in a controlled way" had led to 30,000 deaths. No other parties in the House supported her motion, and Prime Minister Mark Rutte called the accusation "brazen and uncivilized". Another motion by Simons, which called for an investigation into establishing a constitutional court in the Netherlands, was adopted by the House. Simons also described her family history of slavery when potential apologies for the Netherlands' history of slavery were discussed in a House debate in 2021. Mark Rutte cited the moment as one of the reasons that made him decide to issue an apology on behalf of the government the following year. Simons was less active in debates during the last period of her term due to her membership of the Parliamentary Inquiry into Fraud Policy and Public Service, initiated as a result of the Dutch childcare benefits scandal.

On several occasions, the media reported on clashes between Simons and fellow politicians. Renske Leijten asked Simons in October 2021 whether she considered her to be a racist as a result of online comments directed at Leijten by BIJ1 members, and Ockje Tellegen rebuked Simons while chairing a legislative meeting a month later, when Simons wanted to address comments that she described as intimidating. House Speaker Vera Bergkamp later defended Tellegen's actions in a letter after Simons had filed a complaint. Following a 2022 riot in Staphorst against anti-Zwarte Piet protestors, Simons denounced the police's handling and asked Minister of Justice and Security Dilan Yeşilgöz why she resisted a broad investigation into racism in the police force. In turn, Yeşilgöz criticized Simons's description of police officers as using unwarranted violence against citizens.

When the collapse of the fourth Rutte cabinet triggered a November 2023 snap election, Simons announced on 24 July that she would not run for re-election. Two BIJ1 Amsterdam councilors had left the party weeks earlier because of what they alleged to be a toxic and unsafe climate in the party. They mentioned Simons had not supported them enough – a characterization Simons vehemently denied. The party had seen several other internal struggles in the preceding years. Simons also cited her health and well-being reasons for her decision not to run. She was succeeded as party leader by Edson Olf, BIJ1's vice chair. For her work, Simons had received the Ally Award from queer lifestyle magazine Winq in 2022 and the Black Achievement Award from the organization of the Black Achievement Month in 2023.

== Personal life ==
Simons has two children. Her son, Salvatore, was born in 1992, when she was 21 years old. Simons has described the father and her then boyfriend as abusive and depressed. She has told that he stalked her after the end of their three-year relationship, and he died about a year after the birth of their child. According to Simons, the police reported an unknown cause of death, but she believes that it was a suicide. Her second child, Levi, was born in 1996, shortly before Simons's father died by suicide. From late 1998 to 1999, Simons lived in London with her British boxer boyfriend and two children while still working in the Netherlands. She moved to Duivendrecht, situated close to Amsterdam, in 2001 after having spent the intermittent time in Diemen.

She married entrepreneur Frank van Hoorn in early 2003 in Costa Rica. Simons wrote a book about the household, consisting of herself, her husband, her two children, her husband's two teenage daughters, and an au pair, called 1+1=7. Another book by Simons and her half-brother Kenneth Leeuwin, a karate world champion, called In balans about the balance between physical and mental health was published a year later in 2005. Simons and her husband divorced in 2006, and she subsequently had a relationship with entrepreneur Roland Kahn, the founder of clothing retailer CoolCat, in the years 2009–12. She moved from Duivendrecht to Amsterdam, when she became a municipal councilor in 2018 to satisfy a residency requirement, but had moved back to the former village by the time she was installed as member of parliament in 2021.

Simons is non-religious. She often reflects on her day and her actions through a conversation with herself in the mirror. Drawing is a hobby of hers. While a member of parliament, Simons disclosed that she had been suffering from chronic pain for ten years, possibly resulting from osteoarthritis, as well as from long COVID since March 2022.

== Filmography ==
Year	Title	Role
1999	Sexquiz on the beach	Host
1999	Politie door 't lint	Host
2000	De bus	Host
2000–2001	RTL Live	Host
2001–2005	TV makelaar	Host/co-host
2002	Met man en macht	Co-host
2003	Je echte leeftijd	Co-host
2004	Kaft	Host
2005	Bekend en bekeken	Host
2005	Zoop in Africa	Safira
2005	De aanhouder wint	Host
2005–2007	Dancing with the Stars (Dutch version)	Co-host
2006	Inpakken en wegdromen	Host
2006	Opvolger gezocht	Host
2006	Hoe mooi is jouw straat?	Host
2007	Ex Wives Club	Co-host
2007–2009	Char	Host
2008	Nederland vertrekt	Co-host
2009–2010	Sylvana's Choice	Host
2010	Sylvana	Host
2012	Puro 43 Music Sessions	Host
2014	Fashion Planet	Herself
