= Quinsy Gario =

Curaçaoan activist and artist (born 1984)

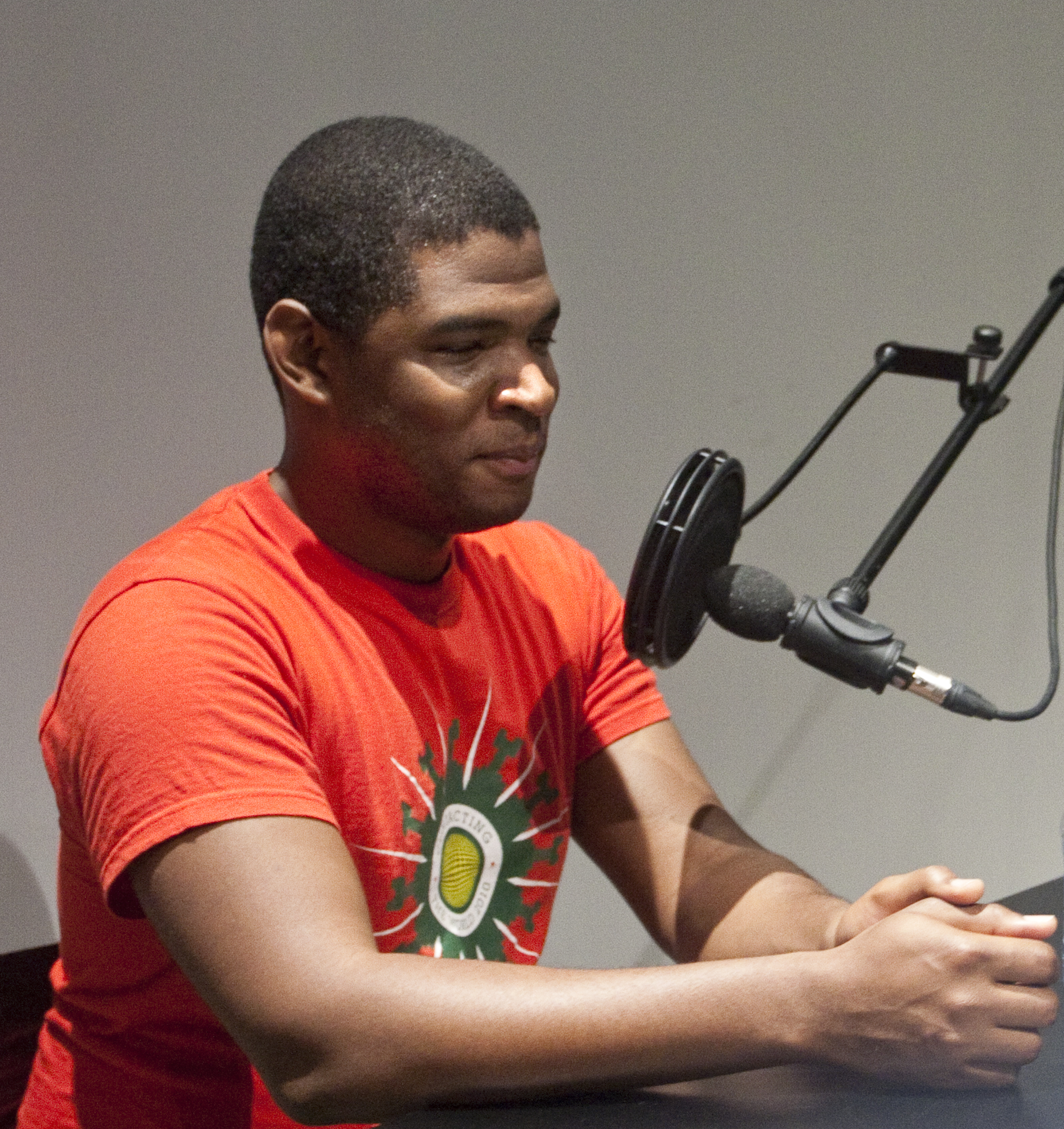
- Gario while visiting Ràdio Web MACBA, June 2014
- Born: 1984 (age 41–42); Curaçao
- Occupations: Artist; activist
- Known for: Opposition against Zwarte Piet

Quinsy Gario (born 1984) is a Curaçaoan activist and artist. He is a prominent opponent of the Dutch tradition of Zwarte Piet. Gario was born in Curaçao and raised in St Maarten before moving to the Netherlands. He created the project Zwarte Piet is Racisme (Black Pete is Racism) about Zwarte Piet. In 2011 he was arrested for public disturbance at the traditional annual Sinterklaas festival where he was protesting against the use of Zwarte Piet. He appeared on a national television talk show in 2013 "to make his case" which was part of a series of events in October that The Economist says "polaris[ed] cultural life and dragging in celebrities, politicians, and even the UN" and "changed Zwarte Piet". For many, even if a year ago he was not a symbol of Dutch racism, he is now."

For the 2021 Dutch general election, it was announced Gario would stand as a candidate for the BIJ1 party on second place on the party list after Sylvana Simons. However, only Simons was elected to the House of Representatives. In July 2021, Gario was suspended from BIJ1 after being accused of "manipulative, disrespectful and toxic behavior" by the party executive board in what was described as part of a series of internal issues within the party. Gario later quit BIJ1.

His brother, Jörgen Gario, is also an artist.
