= Exploitation (film) =

- Directed by: Edwin Brienen
- Screenplay by: Edwin Brienen
- Produced by: Edwin Brienen
- Starring: Eva Dorrepaal; Tomas Sinclair Spencer; Sebastian Suba; Jaron Löwenberg; Anna Fin; Edwin Brienen
- Cinematography: Matthias Tschiedel
- Edited by: Martin Klimke; Riccardo Borgosano (post-production supervisor)
- Music by: Enfant Terrible Productions
- Distributed by: Dislodged Film
- Release dates: October 20, 2012 (Lausanne Underground Film and Music Festival)
- Running time: 74 minutes
- Country: Germany
- Language: English

Exploitation is a 2012 drama film written and directed by Edwin Brienen. The film celebrated its world premiere at the Lausanne Underground Film and Music Festival in October 2012.

== Plot ==
Eva (Eva Dorrepaal) auditions for a role in an obscure arthouse film. An anonymous, masked director (played by British actor Tomas Sinclair Spencer) creates an intimidating atmosphere. He dominates and humiliates Eva, forcing her into prostitution. She sleeps with a Jewish film producer named Josh (played by Jaron Löwenberg). When he refuses to help her financially, Eva blackmails him by threatening to tell his wife that they slept together.

Back on the film set, Eva’s heading towards her own downfall. It’s just a matter of time before her individuality and emotions are eliminated for ‘the sake of art’.

== Notes ==
-Originally conceived as part of a trilogy about independent film making (together with the 2009 film Phantom Party and the canceled Wrong Angle), parts of the film were produced back-to-back with Phantom Party. Both films use the same locations, the same cast members. The character of the insanely driven film director, played by Spencer, shows up in both films.

-Near the end of the film, a sequence named ‘Apocalypse 3’ can be seen. Although not officially mentioned in any title, this could refer to the fact that Brienen sees this film as the final part of his Apocalypse Trilogy, together with Hysteria (2006) and Revision - Apocalypse II (2009).

== LUFF Film festival ==
Exploitation celebrated its world premiere at the Lausanne Underground Film and Music Festival, October 20, 2012. The LUFF website writes about the film: “This gothic-noir satiric fresco transports us into the superficial world of film industry: a business without mercy that only seeks to copy itself without taking any risks. Very auto-reflexive, hilarious at moments, and very dark at others, the film does not hide its preoccupation with a society numbed by its own cliches that it exploits endlessly. Clairvoyant, provoking, and esthetically very interesting, the film is calmer and more easily accessible to a non initiated public than its predecessors.”
