= Eva Dorrepaal =

Dutch actress (born 1970)

- Born: 17 October 1970 (age 55); Leiden, Netherlands
- Occupation: Actress
- Years active: 1993-present

Eva Dorrepaal (born 17 October 1970) is a Dutch actress. She appeared in more than forty films since 1993. On a number of films Dorrepaal collaborated with director Edwin Brienen.

She won the Best Ensemble Cast award at Marina del Rey Film Festival in 2023, for her role in the 2022 feature film "Stars".

== Selected filmography ==
| Year | Title | Role | Notes |
|---|---|---|---|
| 2017 | Black Magic for White Boys | Lucy | |
| 2012 | Exploitation | Eva | |
| 2011 | Walk Away Renee | | |
| 2009 | Revision – Apocalypse II | Traci | |
