= Terrorama =

2001 film by Edwin Brienen

Terrorama!
- Directed by: Edwin Brienen
- Written by: Edwin Brienen
- Produced by: Edwin Brienen
- Starring: Kiki Classen; Esther Eva Verkaaik; Edwin Brienen; Theo van Gogh
- Cinematography: Maurice van Bavel
- Edited by: Juan Morales
- Music by: Ferenc van der Sluijs
- Distributed by: Filmfreak Distribution
- Release date: June 2001
- Running time: 103 minutes
- Country: Netherlands
- Language: Dutch

Terrorama! (2001) is the first feature film of Dutch director Edwin Brienen. In 2002 Terrorama! won the award for Best film at the Melbourne Underground Film Festival and best leading actress at the Toronto Independent Film Festival (Esther Eva Verkaaik).

== Plot ==
The film tells the story of six mental cases, trying to get rid of society's norms and values by kidnapping Gerard van Dongen, a well-known TV host. During an improvised TV show, the terrorists confront this Van Dongen with their darkest thoughts and emotions, resulting in violent excesses and extreme sexual behaviour.

== UK release ==
Salvation Group bought the UK rights for the film in 2003. A DVD was scheduled for release on 4 August 2003, however it was pulled back because of BBFC restrictions. After the killing of Theo van Gogh, Salvation decided to cut the controversial scene with Van Gogh reading from the Koran. The censored version of the film was set to release on 11 June 2007, but was pulled back again for reasons unknown.
