= Katsu Kanai =

Japanese film director (1936–2026)

Kansu
- 金井勝
- Born: 9 July 1936; Kanagawa, Japan
- Died: 22 April 2026 (aged 89); Hino, Tokyo, Japan
- Occupation: Film director

Katsu Kanai (金井 勝, Kanai Katsu; 9 July 1936 – 22 April 2026) was a Japanese experimental and avant-garde film director. The Harvard Film Archive has called him "one of the most vital and inventive filmmakers in the history of Japanese underground film".

== Career ==
Born the son of a farmer in Kanagawa Prefecture, Kanai graduated from the College of Art of Nihon University before finding work at Daiei Film. He later became a freelance cinematographer and founded Kanai Productions in 1968. His first film, The Deserted Archipelago (1969, aka The Desert Island) won the grand prix at the Nyon International Documentary Film Festival. His second film, Good-Bye (1971), was the "first post-war, post-liberation Japanese feature to be filmed in Korea," and according to the film scholar Oliver Dew, illustrated "how a surreal, decided non-representational approach could block the determinations of cultural essentialism". His 2003 work, Super Documentary: The Avant-Garde Senjutsu, was awarded the FIPRESCI award at the International Short Film Festival Oberhausen. Kanai has been the subject of retrospectives at Oberhausen, the Lausanne Underground Film and Music Festival, and the Harvard Film Archive.

Kanai died of pneumonia on 22 April 2026.

== Selected filmography ==
- The Deserted Archipelago (1969)
- Good-Bye (1971)
- The Kingdom (1973)
- The Stormy Times (1991)
- Super Documentary: The Avant-Garde Senjutsu (2003)
