= Anna Smitshuizen =

Dutch prostitute

- Born: February , 1751; Alkmaar, the Netherlands
- Died: June 29, 1775 (aged 24); Amsterdam
- Cause of death: Murdered by Johannes van Goch
- Occupation: Prostitute

Anna Smitshuizen (February 1751 in Alkmaar – 29 June 1775 in Amsterdam), was a Dutch prostitute and the victim of a cause célèbre murder. She was murdered by her former fiancé, the doctor and former ship's surgeon Johannes van Goch, who could not accept that she had terminated their engagement. The case became a subject of public debate and was frequently mentioned in literature as a moral example.

== Bibliography ==
Anna Smitshuizen was the fourth child of German parents. Her father, wig maker Gerrit Smitshuizen, had been born in Xanten, and her mother, Jannetje Kluijt, was born in Meurs. Anna was born in February 1751 and baptised in the Reform Church of Alkmaar on 28 March that year. Whilst living in Alkmaar, she may have been acquainted with author Nicolaas Hoefnagel, who lived in the town for a time and Smitshuizen featured in his writings.

When Smitshuizen was about 19 she left Alkmaar and travelled to Amsterdam, where she became a prostitute. In 1774 she was working in the brothel of Geertruid van Kesteren (aka Zwarte Trui) on Oudezijds Achterburgwal, part of Amsterdam's De Wallen red-light district. The brothel women's medical needs were attended by an ex-ship's doctor, Johannes Bartholomeus Ferdinandus van Goch. Smitshuizen started to have an affair with the doctor.

== Murder ==
Smitshuizen became engaged to van Goch. On 25 May 1775 they travelled to Ouderkerk to inform van Goch's mother. A week later, on 2 June, Smitshuizen broke off the engagement. She had begun to have doubts about van Goch as the city was talking about him following leaflets written by Hoefnagel discrediting van Goch.

Van Goch took the news badly. He threatened to kill himself and sent Smitshuizen a love letter written in his blood. Around 9pm on 29 June 1775 van Goch visited Smitshuizen and pleaded with her in front of her housemates. She told him it was all over and asked him to leave. He refused and around 10.30 the other women tried to get him to leave, but he stabbed Smitshuizen killing her.

He claimed that he had tried to commit suicide and that Smitshuizen was accidentally stabbed trying to stop him. His version of events was not believed, and he was sentenced to death on 16 January 1776. However legal challenges delayed the execution until April 1778. A scaffold was erected in front of the Town Hall and a large crowd gathered in Dam Square to see van Goch executed on the 4 April.

== War of words ==
In late 1777 Nicolaas Hoefnagel published Merkwaardige en zonderlinge levensgevallen van Anna Smitshuizen, gewezene minnares van den thans gevangen zittende JBF van Gog, vervat in samenspraken (Strange and strange lives of Anna Smitshuizen, former mistress of the currently imprisoned JBF van Gog, contained in discussions). In it he portrayed Smitshuizen as being an innocent soul and victim of a godless killer. The book was also directed against fellow author Willem Ockers, an atheist and former employer of van Goch. Ockers responded with Waarachtig bericht, meerendeels getrokken uit echte brieven en geschriften van den thans op de Gevangen-Poort geconfineerde J.B.F. van Goch. Aan zyn famielje en goede vrienden geschreven, zynde een zaakelyk verhaal, van al't rampzalige dat ... is voorgevallen; benevens een waarachtige beschrijving van ... Anna Smitshuizen (True message, mostly drawn from real letters and writings of the JBF van Goch, who is currently reconstructed at the Prison Gate. Written to his family and close friends, a business-like story, of all the disastrous that ... has happened; in addition to a true description of ... Anna Smitshuizen). In which van Goch is the virtuous doctor who was seduced by the harlot. Although neither account can be viewed as reliable, the pieces give an insight into prostitution in 1770s Amsterdam.

== Bibliography ==
- Hoefnagel, Nicolaas (1777). Merkwaardige en zonderlinge levensgevallen van Anna Smitshuizen, gewezene minnares van den thans gevangen zittende JBF van Gog, vervat in samenspraken [Strange and strange lives of Anna Smitshuizen, former mistress of the currently imprisoned JBF van Gog, contained in discussions]. Maagh.
- Jongenelen, Tom (2002). "Johannes Bartholomeus Ferdinandus van Goch. Goddeloos moordenaar, berouwvol zondaar?". Achter slot en grendel: schrijvers in Nederlandse gevangenschap 1700-1800 (in Dutch). Walburg Pers. ISBN 9789057302190.
- Ockers, Willem (1778). Waarachtig bericht, meerendeels getrokken uit echte brieven en geschriften van den thans op de Gevangen-Poort geconfineerde J.B.F. van Goch. Aan zyn famielje en goede vrienden geschreven, zynde een zaakelyk verhaal, van al't rampzalige dat ... is voorgevallen; benevens een waarachtige beschrijving van ... Anna Smitshuizen [True message, mostly drawn from real letters and writings of the JBF van Goch, who is currently reconstructed at the Prison Gate. Written to his family and close friends, a business-like story, of all the disastrous that ... has happened; in addition to a true description of ... Anna Smitshuizen] (in Dutch). J.C.A. Dammant.
- Spierenburg, Petrus Cornelis; Spierenburg, Pieter (2004). Written in Blood: Fatal Attraction in Enlightenment Amsterdam. Ohio State University Press. ISBN 9780814209554.
