= Independent Party of Alkmaar =

The Independent Party of Alkmaar (Dutch: Onafhankelijke Partij Alkmaar, OPA) is a municipal political party in Alkmaar, in the Natherlands. It was established in 1996.

At the regular four-yearly Dutch municipal elections, the party won seven seats in 2010, ten in 2014, six in 2018, five in 2022 and four in 2026.
