= Alkmaar =

City and municipality in North Holland, Netherlands

- City and municipality
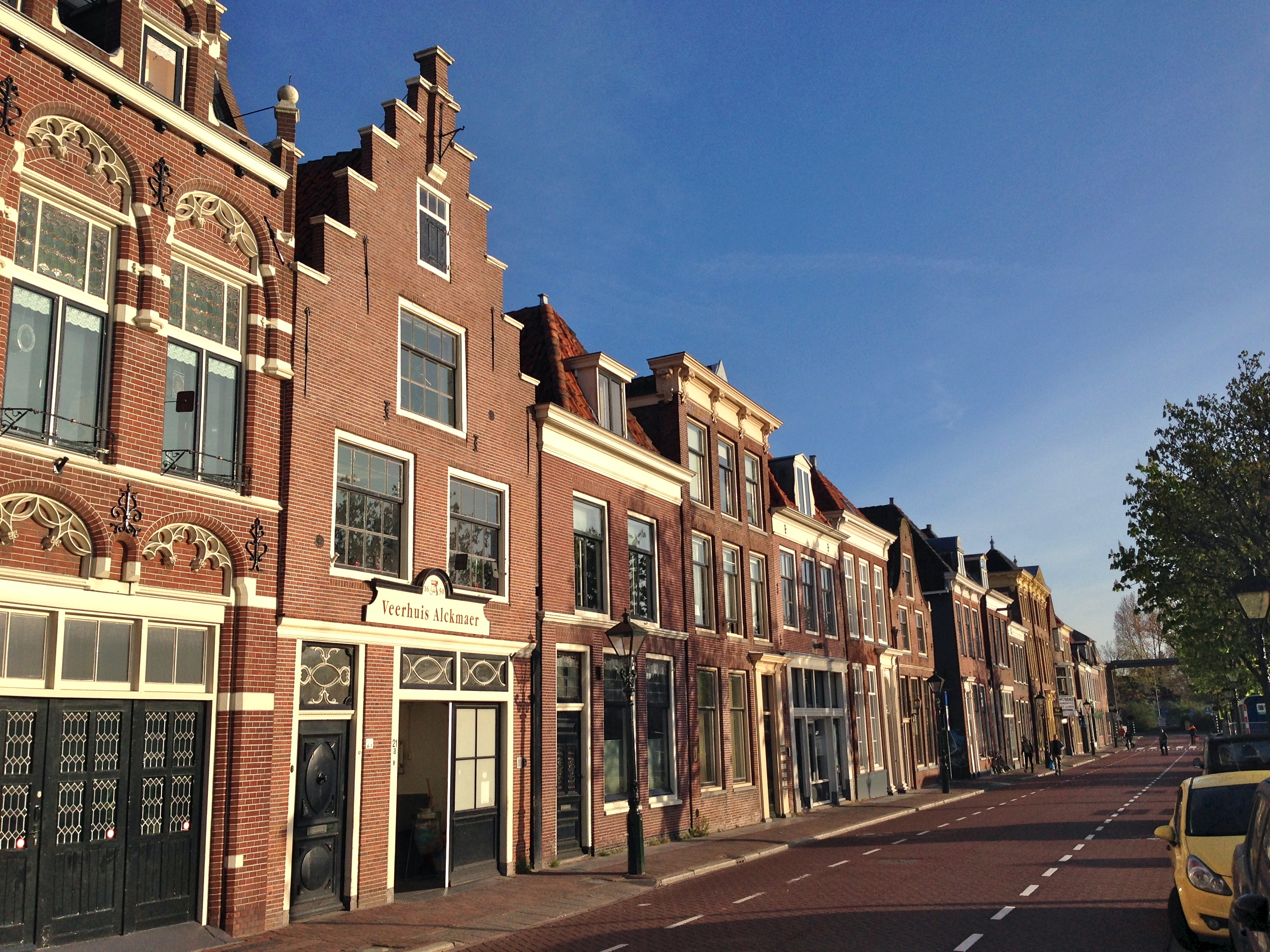
- De Bierkade

- Flag Coat of arms

- Location in North Holland

- Location within the Netherlands Location within Europe
- Coordinates: 52°38′N 4°45′E
- Country: Netherlands
- Province: North Holland

Government
  - Body: Municipal council
  - Mayor: Anja Schouten

Area
  - Total: 117.35 km^{2} (45.31 sq mi)
  - Land: 110.46 km^{2} (42.65 sq mi)
  - Water: 6.89 km^{2} (2.66 sq mi)
- Elevation: 1 m (3.3 ft)

Population (November 2022)
  - Total: 113,170
  - Density: 1,012/km^{2} (2,620/sq mi)
- Demonym(s): Alkmaarder (Informal) Kaaskop
- Time zone: UTC+1 (CET)
  - Summer (DST): UTC+2 (CEST)
- Postcode: 1800–1831
- Area code: 072
- Website: www.alkmaar.nl

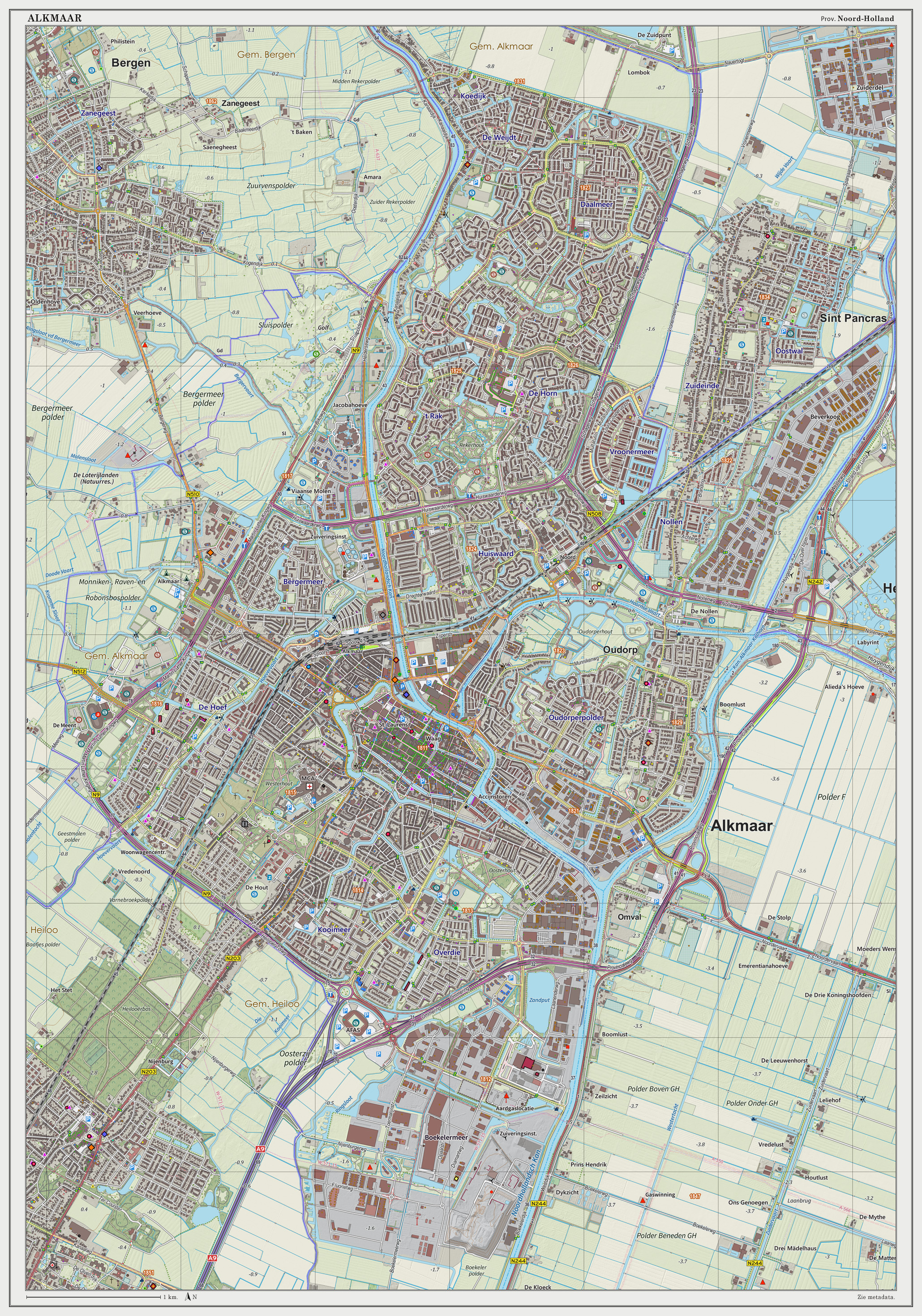
Topographic map of Alkmaar, Sept. 2014

Alkmaar (Dutch pronunciation: [ˈɑl(ə)kmaːr]) is a city and municipality in the Netherlands, located in the province of North Holland. Alkmaar is well known for its traditional cheese market. For tourists, it is a popular cultural destination. The municipality has a population of 113,170 as of 2023.

== History ==
The earliest mention of the name Alkmaar is in a 10th-century document. As the village grew into a town, it was granted city rights in 1254. The oldest part of Alkmaar lies on an ancient sand bank a couple of meters (yards) above the surrounding region; it afforded some protection from inundation during medieval times. Its vicinage consists of some of the oldest polders in existence. Older spellings include Alckmar.

On 24 June 1572, after the Geuzen captured the town, five Franciscans from Alkmaar were taken to Enkhuizen and hanged, becoming the martyrs of Alkmaar.

=== Siege of Alkmaar ===
In 1573, the city underwent a siege by Spanish forces under the leadership of Don Fadrique, son of the Duke of Alva. The citizens sent urgent messages for help to the Prince of Orange; he responded by promising to open the floodgates of the dykes and flood the region if the need arose, which despite the protestations of the peasantry, fearful for their harvest, he proceeded to do.

Some of his dispatches fell into the hands of Don Fadrique, and, with the waters beginning to rise, the Spaniards raised the siege and fled. It was a turning point in the Eighty Years War and gave rise to the expression Bij Alkmaar begint de victorie ("Victory begins at Alkmaar"). The event is still celebrated every year in Alkmaar on 8 October, the day the siege ended.

=== Since the French Revolutionary Wars ===
In 1799, during the French Revolutionary Wars, an Anglo-Russian expeditionary force captured the city but was ultimately defeated in the Battle of Castricum. After that battle, on 18 October 1799, the two opposing sides held the Convention of Alkmaar which met to determine the fate of the defeated Anglo-Russian force. The French victory was commemorated on the Arc de Triomphe in Paris as "Alkmaer".

The North Holland Canal, opened in 1824, was dug through Alkmaar. In 1865 and 1867, the railways between Alkmaar and Den Helder and between Alkmaar and Haarlem were built respectively.

In the second half of the 20th century, Alkmaar expanded quickly with development of new neighbourhoods. On 1 October 1972, the town of Oudorp and the southern portions of Koedijk and Sint Pancras were added to the municipality of Alkmaar.

== Administrative divisions ==
Historical population
Year	Pop.	±% p.a.
1398	3,800	—
1514	4,179	+0.08%
1622	12,417	+1.01%
1632	13,200	+0.61%
1660	13,650	+0.12%
1732	12,500	−0.12%
1795	7,514	−0.80%
Source: Lourens & Lucassen 1997, pp. 54–55

The municipality of Alkmaar historically consists of the following cities, towns, villages and districts: Alkmaar, Bergermeer, Daalmeer, De Hoef, De Horn, De Nollen, Het Rak, Huiswaard, Koedijk (southeastern part), Overdie, Oudorp and Omval. On 1 January 2015, the municipalities of Graft-De Rijp and Schermer were merged into Alkmaar. The historical village of De Rijp is thus since a part of Alkmaar.

These once separate villages are now all linked together by the suburban sprawl of buildings that arose between the late 1970s and early 1990s. During this time, the population of Alkmaar almost doubled.

== Local government ==
The municipal council of Alkmaar consists of 39 seats, which are divided as follows after the 2026 elections.

- GroenLinks/PvdA – 9 seats
- D66 – 5 seats
- BAS – 5 seats
- VVD – 4 seats
- OPA – 4 seats
- FvD – 3 seats
- CDA – 3 seats
- Leefbaar Alkmaar – 2 seats
- Partij voor de Dieren – 1 seat
- Senior's Party of Alkmaar (Senioren Partij Alkmaar) – 1 seat
- Status Quo – 1 seat
- SP – 1 seat

== Transport ==
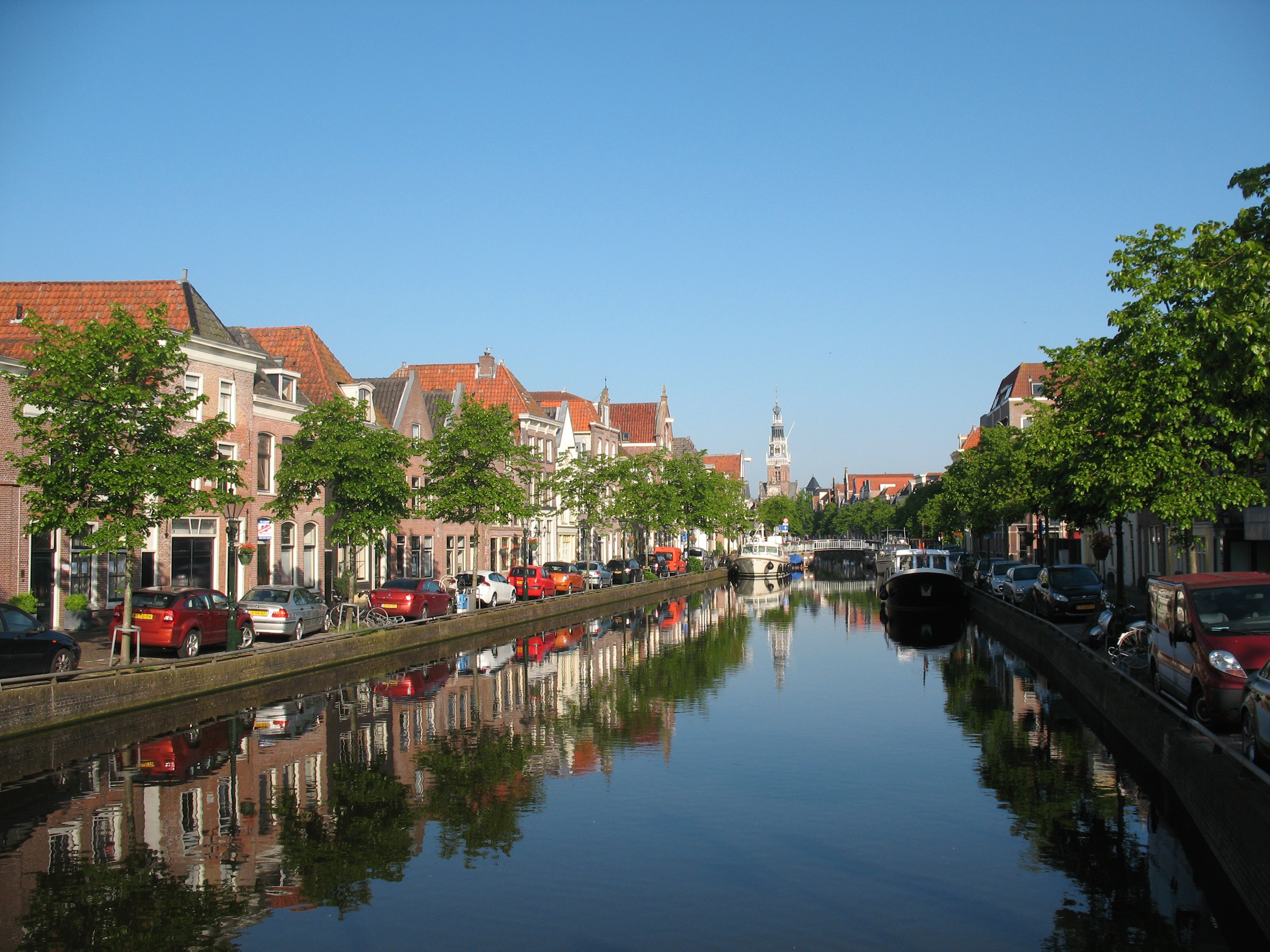
City center

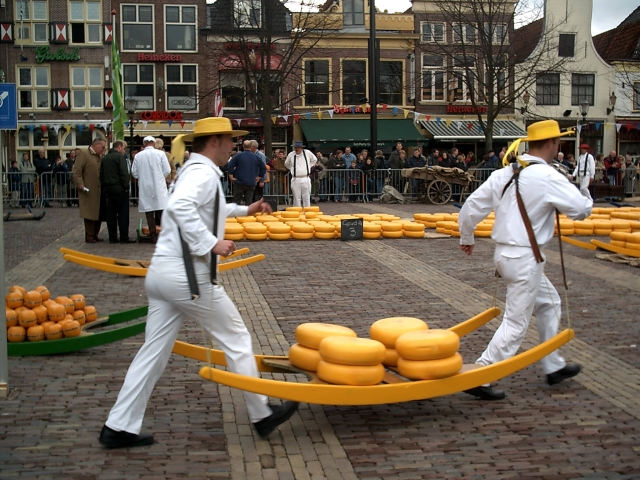
Cheese market

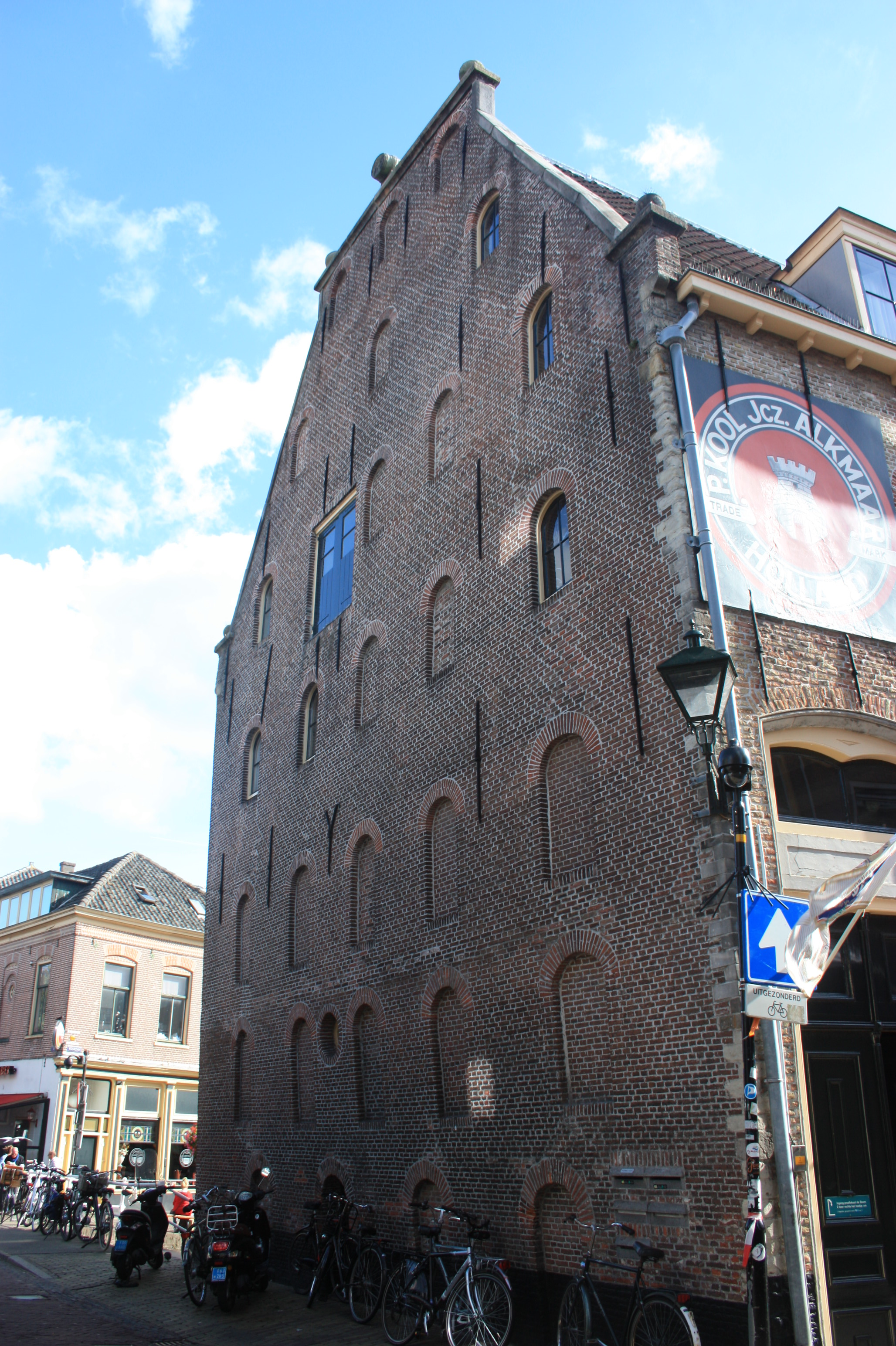
North gable of the Beer Museum in Alkmaar

The A9 motorway runs from Amsterdam to Alkmaar, then continues on to Den Helder as the N9.

There are direct trains to Den Helder, Hoorn, Zaandam, Amsterdam, Utrecht, Ede, Arnhem, Nijmegen, 's-Hertogenbosch, Eindhoven, Maastricht and Haarlem. For exact details see Alkmaar railway station.

Alkmaar has two railway stations:

- Alkmaar
- Alkmaar Noord

The waterway Noordhollandsch Kanaal, which opened in 1824, runs through Alkmaar. As of 2017. it can be crossed (among other ways) using two of the five operating vlotbruggen, Koedijkervlotbrug and Rekervlotbrug.

Air travel is served by the nearest Schiphol Airport which is approximately 22 km south of Alkmaar. NS operates direct train services between Alkmaar and Schiphol.

== Main sights ==
Alkmaar has many medieval buildings that are still intact, most notably the tall tower of the Grote or Sint-Laurenskerk, where many people from Alkmaar hold wedding ceremonies. The other main attraction, especially in the summer months, is Alkmaar's cheese market at the Waagplein, one of the country's most popular tourist attractions. The cheese market traditionally takes place from the first Friday in April through the first Friday in September. Every Friday morning (10:00–12:30) the Waagplein is the backdrop for this traditional cheese market. After the old-fashioned way of the hand clap, traders and carriers will weigh the cheeses. It is one of only four traditional Dutch cheese markets still in existence. The traditional fare of this cheese market is those cheeses made in the local area, as opposed to the well-known brands of Dutch cheeses, including the Edam and Gouda cheeses. It is not actually possible to buy cheese at the market itself, which is really only a demonstration of how this merchants' market operated in times gone by. However, the demonstration, which takes place in front of the medieval weighing house, is surrounded by many specialized stalls where it is possible to buy all kinds of cheese (and non-cheese) related products. The Waag is also home to the local tourist office and a cheese museum. Alkmaar has 399 registered rijksmonuments, of which most are situated along the city's old canals.

Alkmaar has two large theatres and a big cinema (which was originally two cinemas). A red light district is situated at the Achterdam, and Alkmaar has a nightlife scene as well which takes place in the pubs in front of the cheesemarket.

=== Museums ===
- Beatles Museum – dedicated to The Beatles, as John Lennon's first guitar was made in Alkmaar
- Holland Cheese Museum – located in the historic weigh house
- National Beer Museum "De Boom"
- Op ArtMuseum - closed since 2014
- City Museum Alkmaar – for history of the city

== Events ==
Alkmaar's largest annual event is Alkmaars Ontzet (8 October), which commemorates the lifting of the 1573 siege. It begins on the night of 7 October with a lantern procession (lampionnenoptocht) of local schoolchildren through the city centre, followed the next day by a wreath-laying ceremony, an afternoon parade, and a communal sauerkraut-and-sausage meal (zuurkoolmaaltijd).

Other recurring events include Kaeskoppenstad, a historical reenactment festival recreating 16th-century city life, held each June and drawing around 25,000 visitors over a weekend; the Landbouw- en Lappendag (Agricultural and Cloth Market Day), held annually in September and dating back over 120 years, combining livestock displays and a regional produce market with a traditional cloth and textiles market in the city centre; and Alkmaar Pride, a nine-day Pride event which starts with a Pride Walk and ends with a canal parade, held at the end of May.

Alkmaar also holds the Zomerkermis each August, an annual funfair dating back to 1339 as one of the oldest and largest in the province of North Holland.

== Sports ==
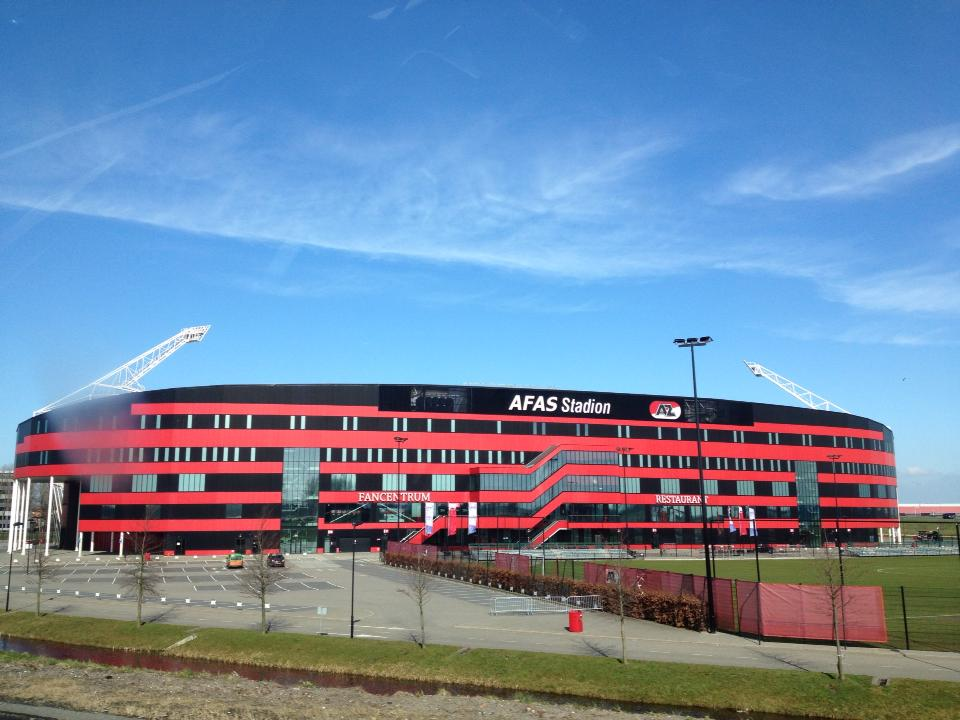
AFAS Stadion

Alkmaar is home to the professional football team AZ (Alkmaar Zaanstreek). In 2006, the club moved to a new 17,000 capacity stadium, the DSB Stadion, now named the AFAS Stadion. In 2008–2009, AZ won the Eredivisie, the Dutch football league. It was the second league title for the club after the Eredivisie in 1980/81 with only one league defeat. Notable coaches include former FC Barcelona coach Ronald Koeman, and Netherlands national football team coach Louis van Gaal.

The city also has a velodrome where the Dutch national track cycling championships are held every year. The city hosted the 2019 European Road Championships.

== Notable residents ==
=== Public service ===
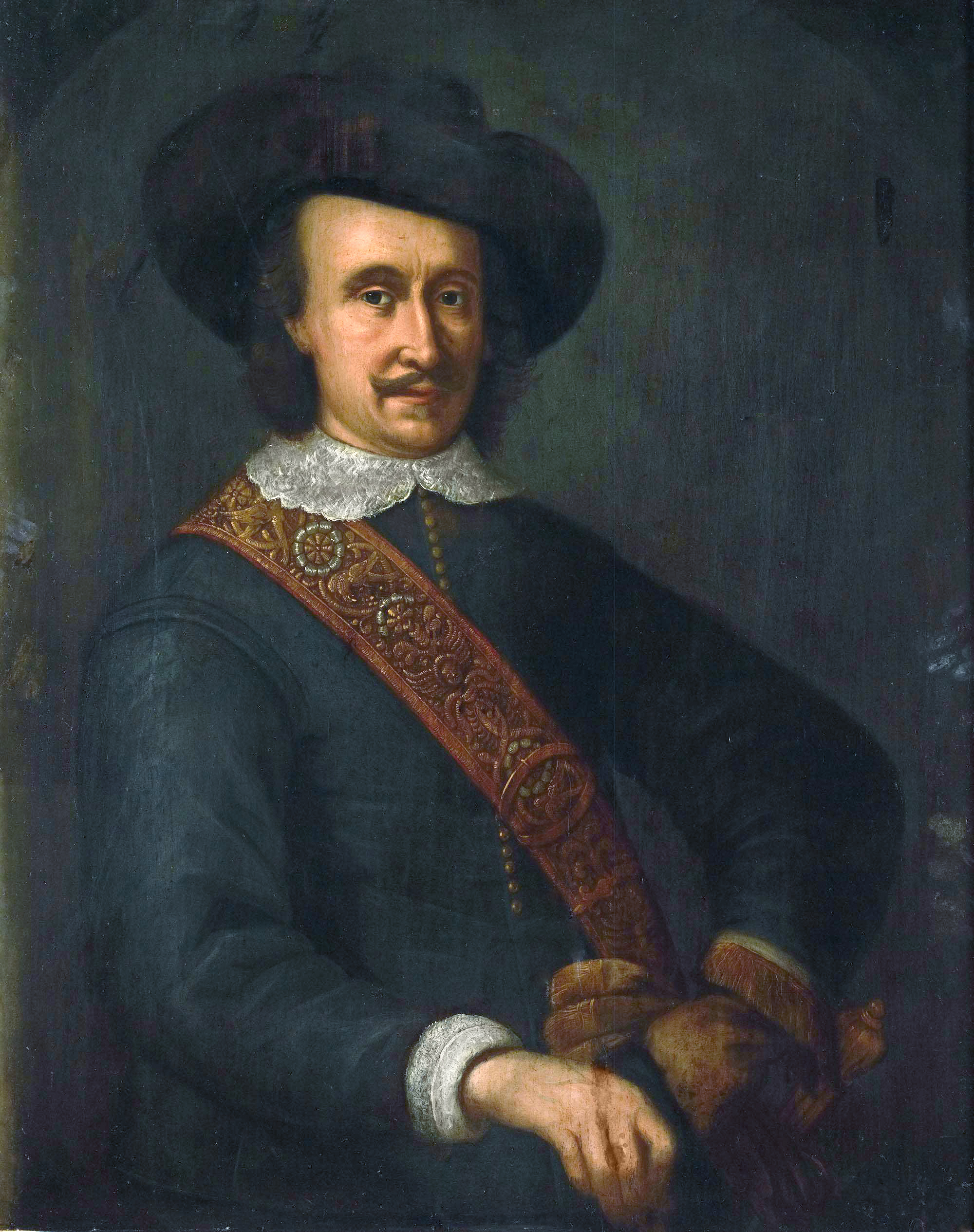
Cornelis van der Lijn, ca.1650

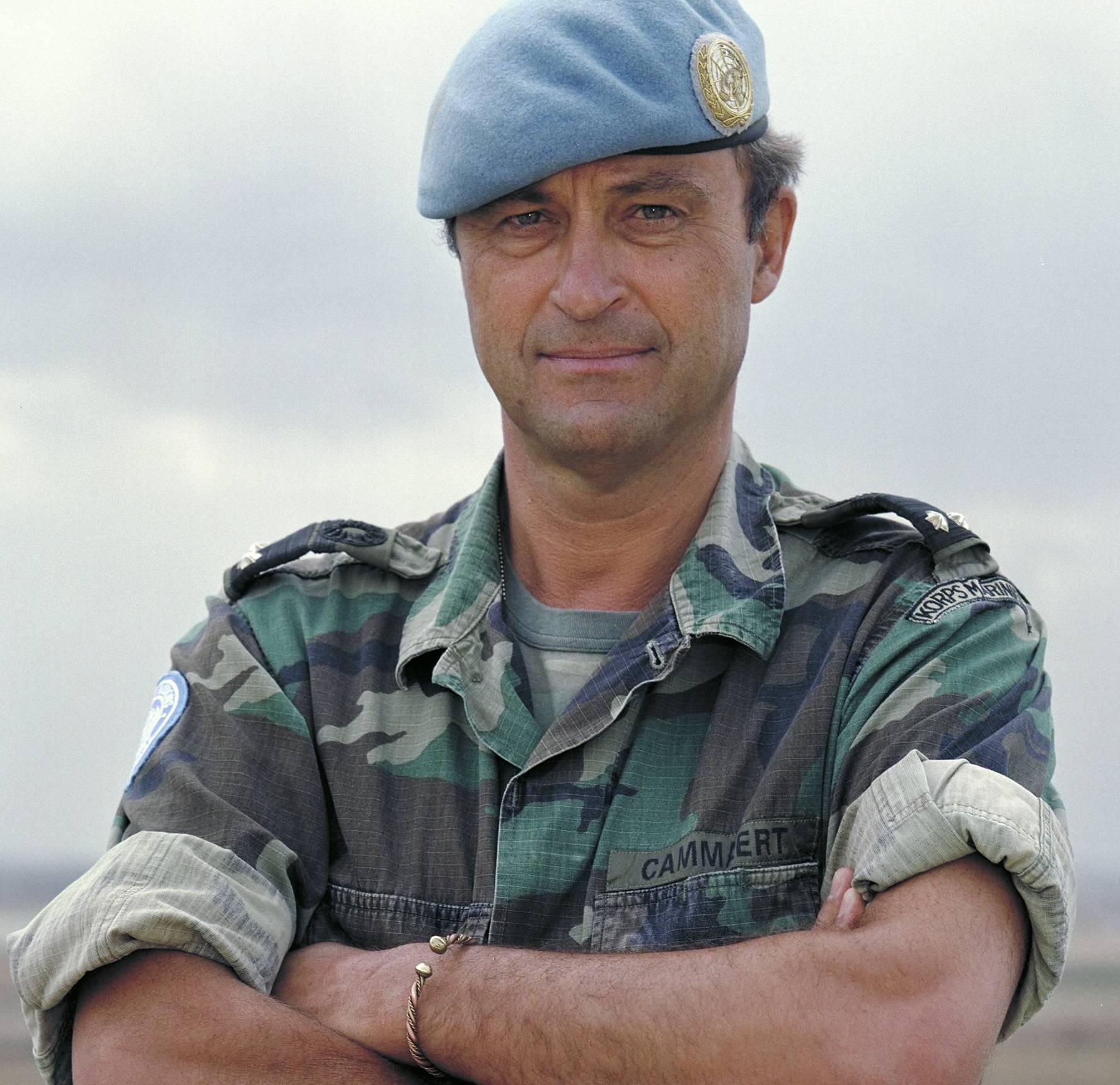
Patrick Cammaert, 2001

- Isaac Dorislaus (1595–1649), a Dutch Calvinist historian and lawyer
- Jan Janse de Weltevree (born 1595), a Dutch sailor, the first Dutchman to visit Korea
- Cornelis van der Lijn (1608–1679), Governor-General of the Dutch East Indies 1646-1650 and elected Mayor of Alkmaar in 1668
- Bernard Nieuwentyt (1654–1718), a Dutch philosopher, mathematician, physician and magistrate
- Anna Smitshuizen (1751–1775), the victim of a cause célèbre murder
- Kees Boeke (1884–1966), a Dutch reformist educator, Quaker missionary and pacifist
- Nicolette Bruining (1886–1963), a Dutch theologian, teacher and humanitarian in WWII
- Geertruida Wijsmuller-Meijer (1896–1978), a resistance fighter, saved Jewish children
- Cornelis Berkhouwer (1919–1992), politician, President of the European Parliament 1973-1975
- Rudi Vis (1941–2010), British Labour politician, MP 1997 to 2010
- Jaap Pop (1941–2026), a Dutch politician, Mayor of Alkmaar 1988-1995
- Sybilla Dekker (born 1942), a retired Dutch politician and businesswoman
- Ronald Bandell (1946–2015), a Dutch civil servant, politician and Mayor of Alkmaar 1995–2000
- Jos Punt (born 1946), bishop in the Roman Catholic Diocese of Haarlem-Amsterdam
- Patrick Cammaert (born 1950), retired Dutch general and commander of UN peacekeeping missions
- Troy Parrott (born 2002), Irish footballer

=== The arts ===
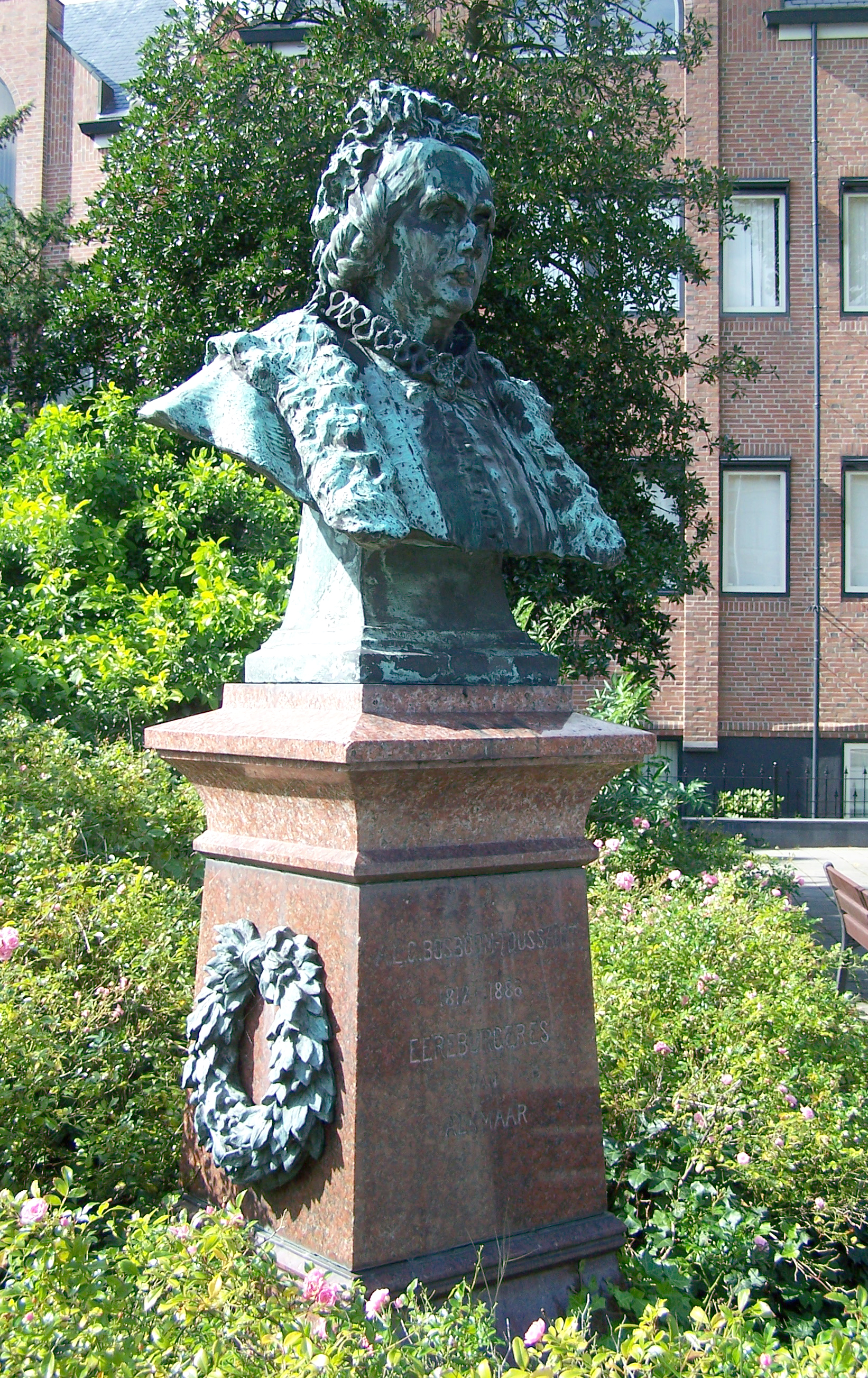
Bust of A.L.G. Bosboom-Toussaint in Alkmaar

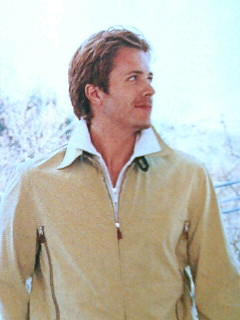
Roderick Teerink, 2006

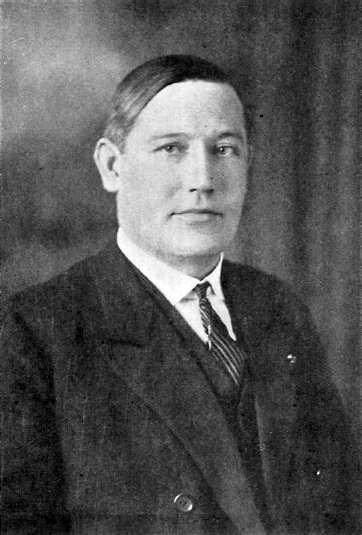
Jan Wils, 1928

- Maria Tesselschade Roemers Visscher (1594–1649), poet and engraver
- Pieter van Schaeyenborgh (1600–1657), painter known for pictures of fish; worked in Alkmaar from 1635
- brothers Caesar van Everdingen (1616/7-1678) and Allaert van Everdingen (1621–1675) Dutch Golden Age painters
- Emanuel de Witte (1617–1692), a Dutch perspective painter of genre paintings
- Willem de Fesch (1687–1761), a virtuoso Dutch violone player and composer
- Geertruida Bosboom-Toussaint (1812–1886) a Dutch novelist
- Cécile de Jong van Beek en Donk (1866–1944) a Dutch feminist writer
- Dirk Smorenberg (1883–1960), a Dutch Art Deco painter
- Jan Wils (1891–1972), a Dutch architect and founding member of the De Stijl movement
- Jan Gerrit van Gelder (1903–1980), a Dutch art historian
- Ans Wortel (1929–1996), a Dutch painter, poet and writer
- Rudi Carrell (1934–2006), entertainer, hosted his own TV show
- Dan van der Vat (1939–2019), a journalist, writer and military historian
- Angela Groothuizen (born 1959), a Dutch singer, artist and TV personality
- Karin Bloemen (born 1960) is a Dutch actress and singer
- Lorena Kloosterboer (born 1962), a Dutch-Argentine artist who paints using trompe-l'œil
- Joost Zwagerman (1963–2015), a Dutch writer, poet and essayist
- Marco Borsato (born 1966), a Dutch singer
- Edwin Brienen (born 1971), a Dutch film director, actor, producer and journalist
- Hellen van Meene (born 1972), a Dutch photographer known for her portraits
- Tom Six (born 1973), a Dutch horror filmmaker, writer and actor
- Roderick Teerink (born 1976), a Dutch-Argentine actor and music producer
- Sabine Marcelis (born 1985), a Dutch-New Zealander artist and designer
- Melissa Venema (born 1995), a Dutch trumpet player

=== Science and business ===
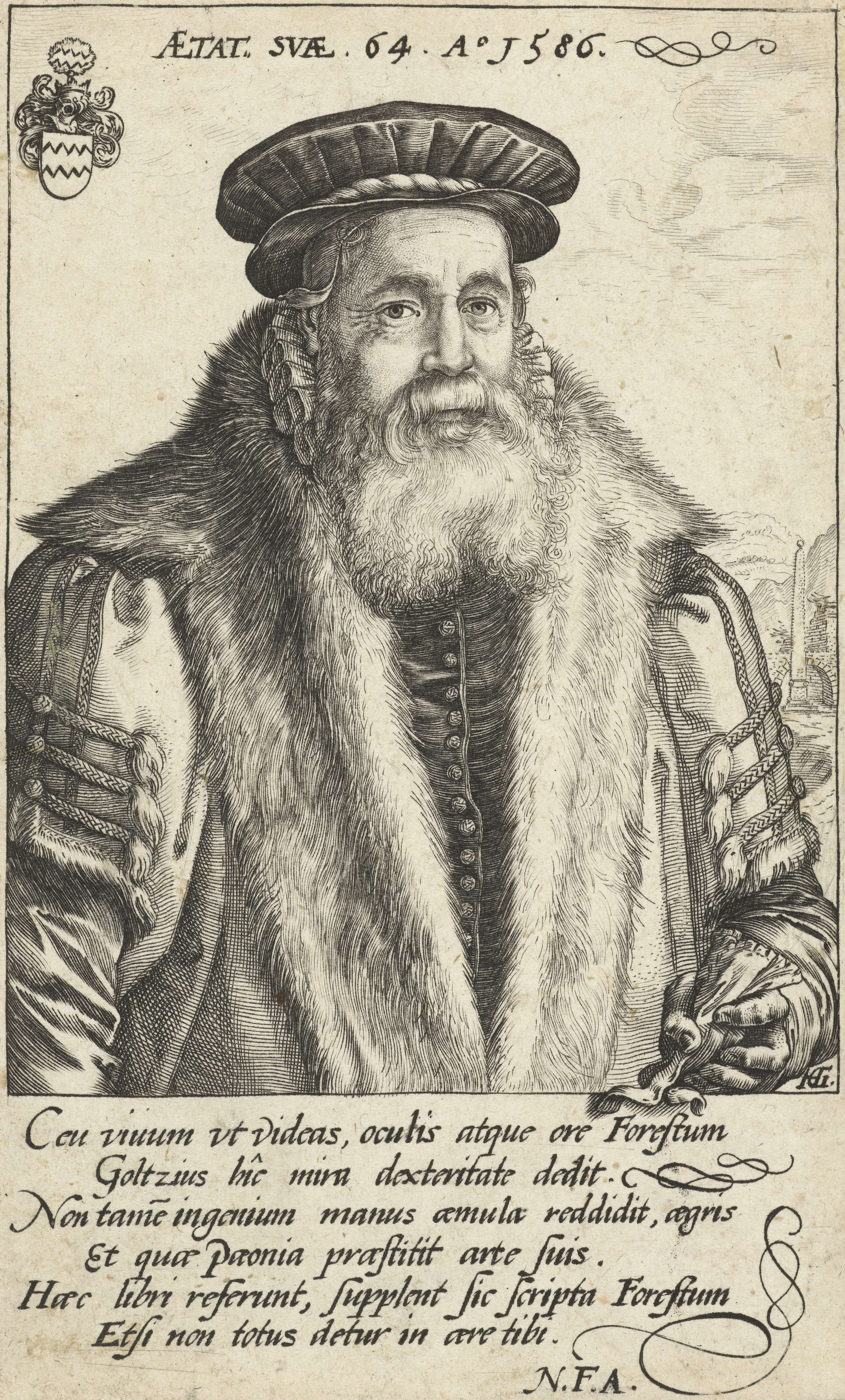
Pieter van Foreest, ca.1590

- Petrus Forestus (1521–1597), a prominent physician of the Dutch Republic
- Adriaan Anthonisz (1527–1607), a mathematician, surveyor, cartographer, military engineer and burgomaster of Alkmaar
- Willem Blaeu (1571–1638), a Dutch cartographer, atlas maker and publisher
- Adriaan Metius (1571–1635), a Dutch geometer and astronomer
- Cornelis Drebbel (1572–1633), a Dutch engineer, in 1620 built the first navigable submarine
- Jan Leeghwater (1575–1650), a Dutch architect, mill builder and hydraulic engineer
- Joan Blaeu (1598–1673), a Dutch cartographer
- Adriaan Reland (1676–1718), a Dutch Orientalist scholar and cartographer
- Hendrik Willem Bakhuis Roozeboom (1854–1907), a Dutch chemist who studied phase behaviour in physical chemistry
- Alfred Peet (1920–2007), founder of American coffee retailer Peet's Coffee
- Jacob Gelt Dekker (1948–2019), a Dutch businessman, philanthropist and writer

=== Sport ===
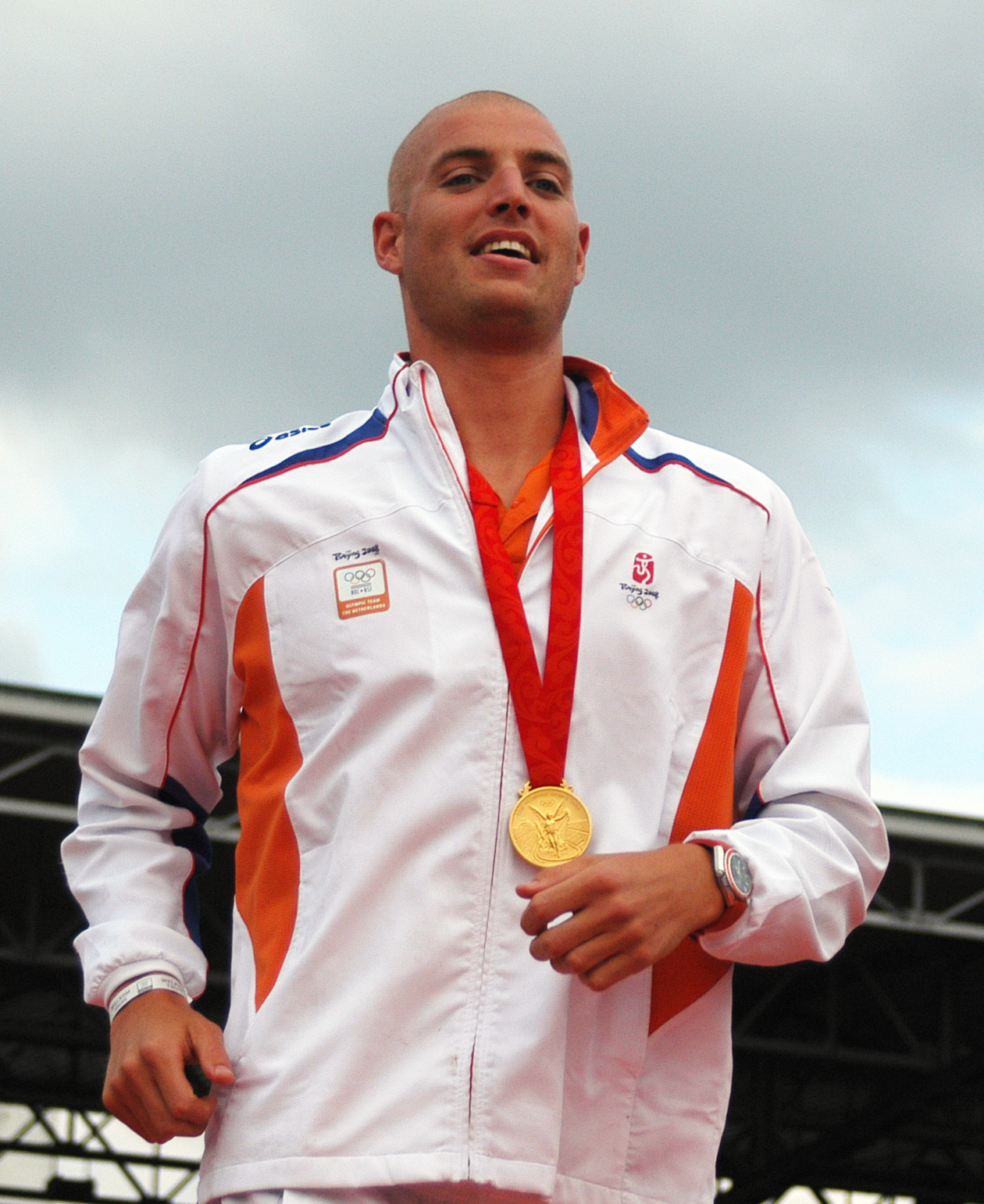
Maarten van der Weijden, 2008

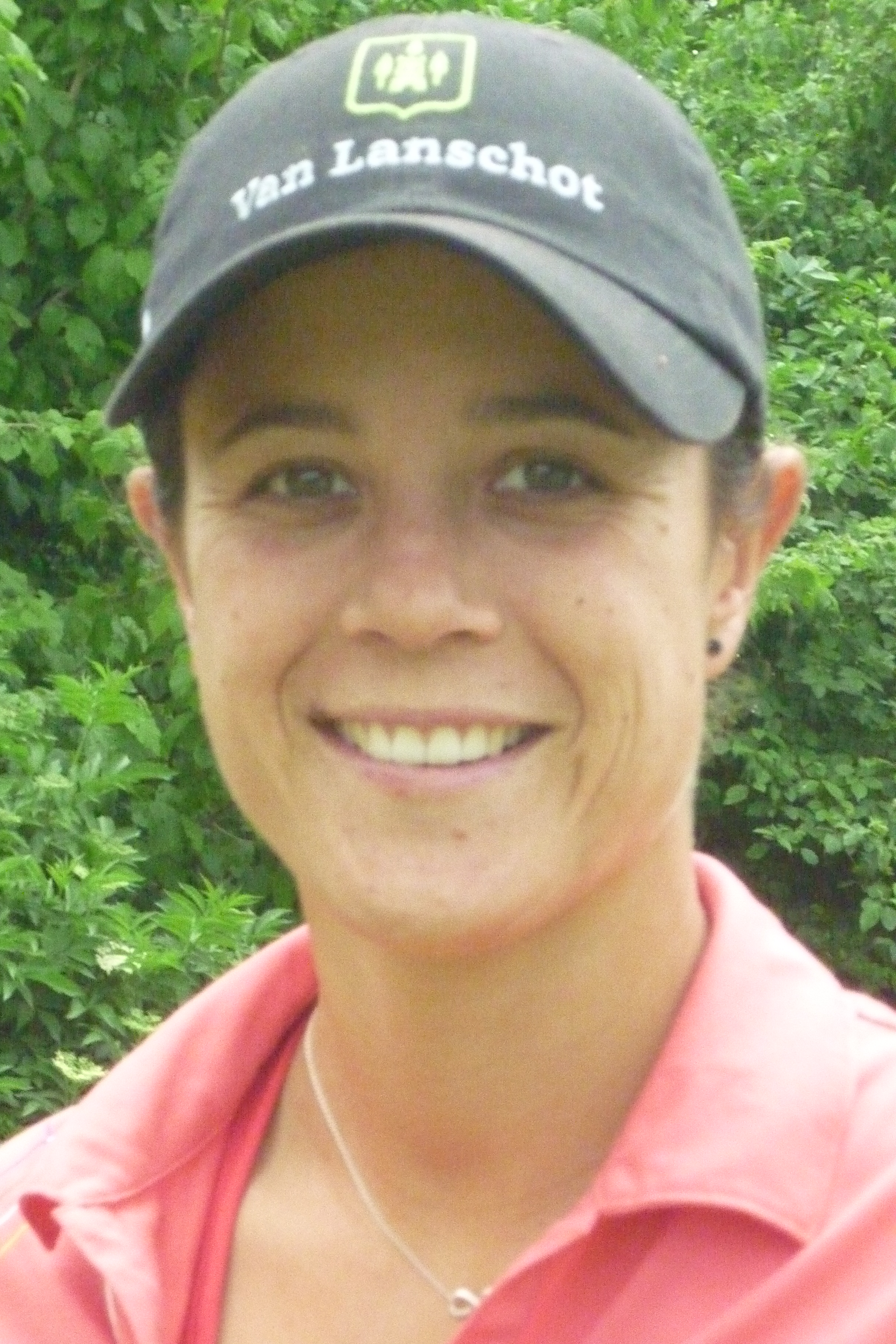
Dewi Claire Schreefel, 2012

- Harm Ottenbros (1943–2022), a Dutch road bicycle racer, 1969 world champion
- Dick Quax (1948–2018), a Dutch-born New Zealand long-distance runner
- Hans Nijman (1959–2014), a Dutch former mixed martial artist and professional wrestler
- Richard Goulooze (born 1967), a Dutch former professional footballer with 351 club caps
- Michel Vonk (born 1968), a Dutch former professional footballer with 342 club caps
- Jakko Jan Leeuwangh (born 1972), a former speed skater
- Macha van der Vaart (born 1972), a Dutch field hockey player, team bronze and silver medallist at the 2000 and 2004 Summer Olympics
- Steven de Jongh (born 1973), a Dutch former road bicycle racer
- brothers Yuri Cornelisse (born 1975) and Tim Cornelisse (born 1978), Dutch retired footballers with 371 and 445 club caps
- Jochem Verberne (born 1978), rower, team silver medallist in the 2000 Summer Olympics
- Maarten van der Weijden (born 1981), a Dutch long distance and marathon swimmer; Dutch Sportsman of the year 2008
- Theo Bos (born 1983), a Dutch road and track cyclist
- Wesley Harms (born 1984), a Dutch professional darts player
- Gago Drago (born 1985), an Armenian-Dutch welterweight kickboxer
- Dewi Claire Schreefel (born 1985), a Dutch female professional golfer on the LPGA Tour
- Tom Büdgen (born 1985), a Dutch professional wrestler who previously worked in WWE, currently signed to All Elite Wrestling under the ring name Malakai Black
- Yvonne Hak (born 1986), a Dutch middle-distance runner, won gold at the 2010 European Athletics Championships
- Nycke Groot (born 1988), a Dutch handball player, 141 caps with the women's national team
- Joyce Sombroek (born 1990), a Dutch field hockey goalkeeper, team gold and silver medallist at the 2012 and 2016 Summer Olympics
- Fabian Holland (born 2002), a Dutch born rugby player with the New Zealand rugby team, All Blacks
- Indy Dontje (born 1992), a Dutch racing driver

== Twin towns—sister cities ==
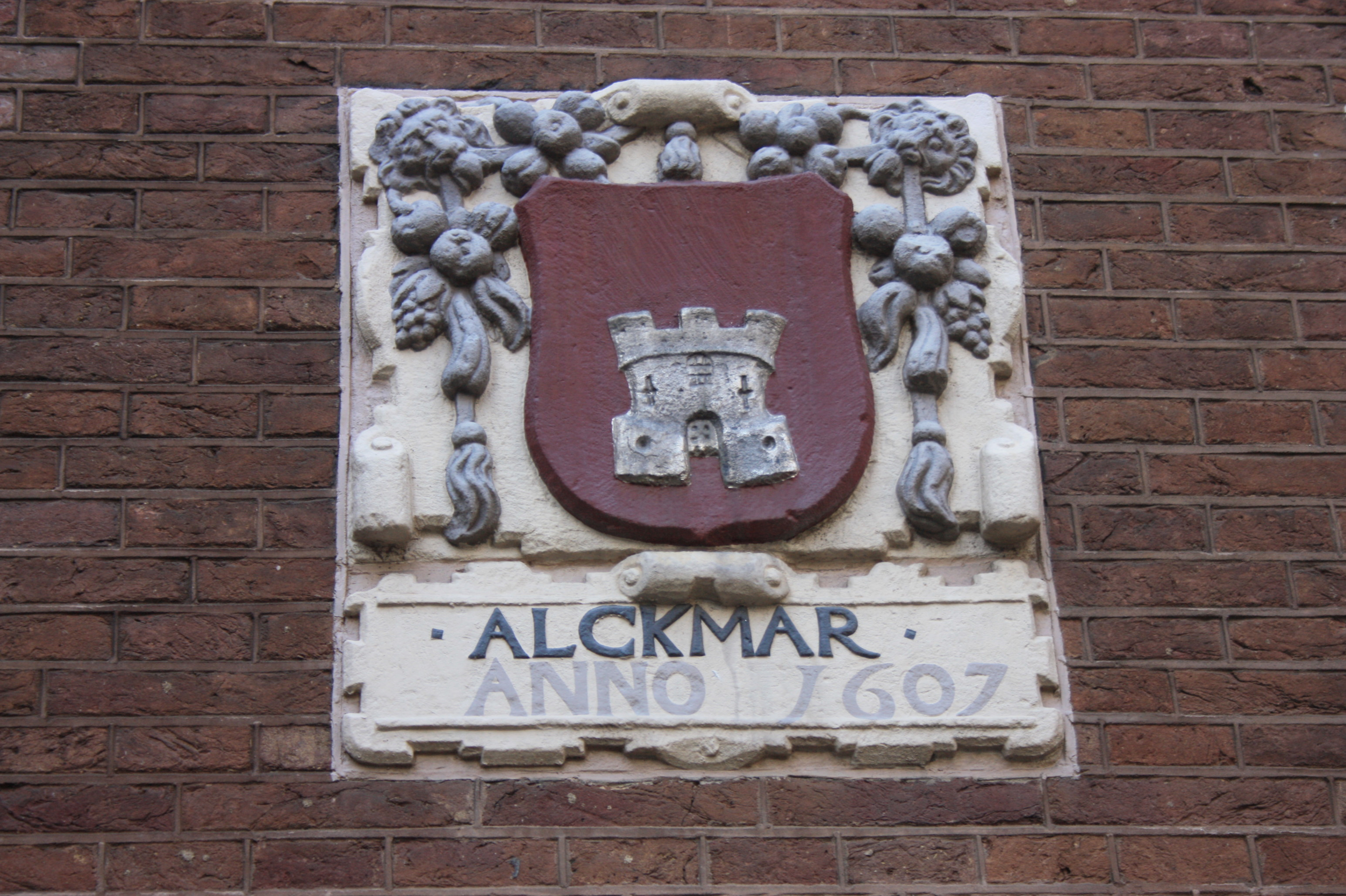
Old Alkmaar plaque, Amsterdam Museum

Alkmaar is twinned with:

Bath, United Kingdom; Bergama, Turkey; Darmstadt, Germany, since 1958	Tata, Hungary; Troyes, France

== Gallery ==
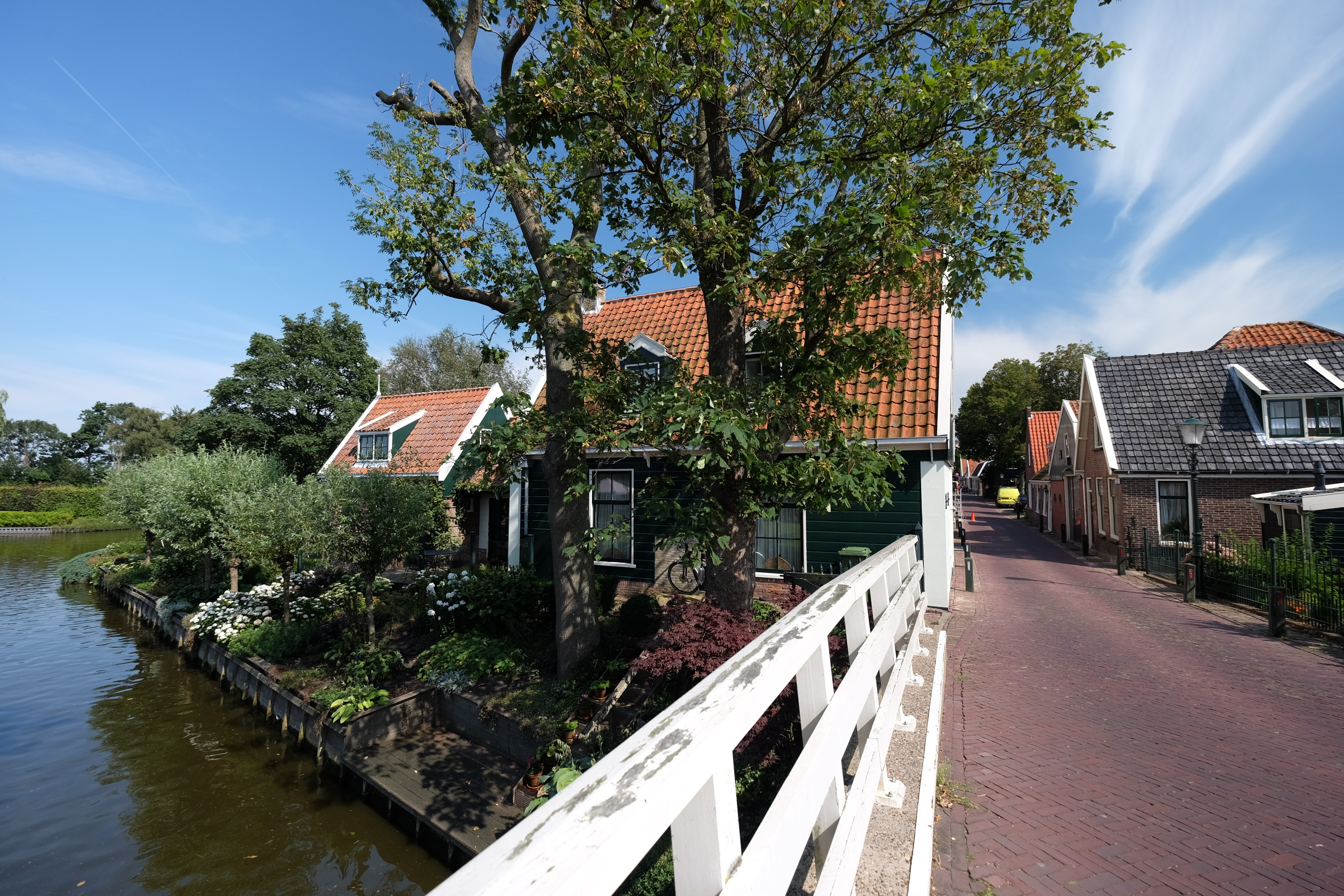
De Rijp

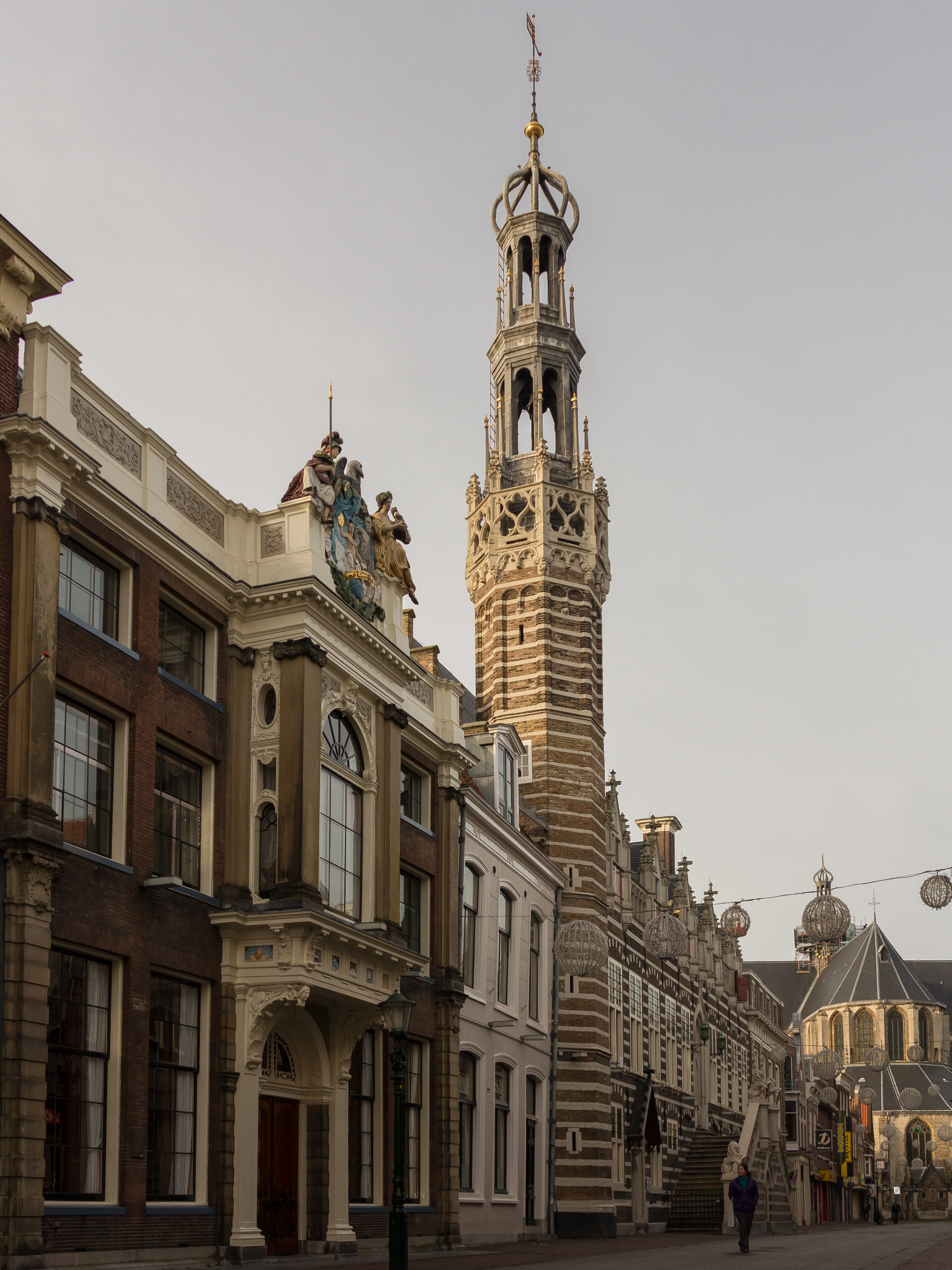
Townhall tower

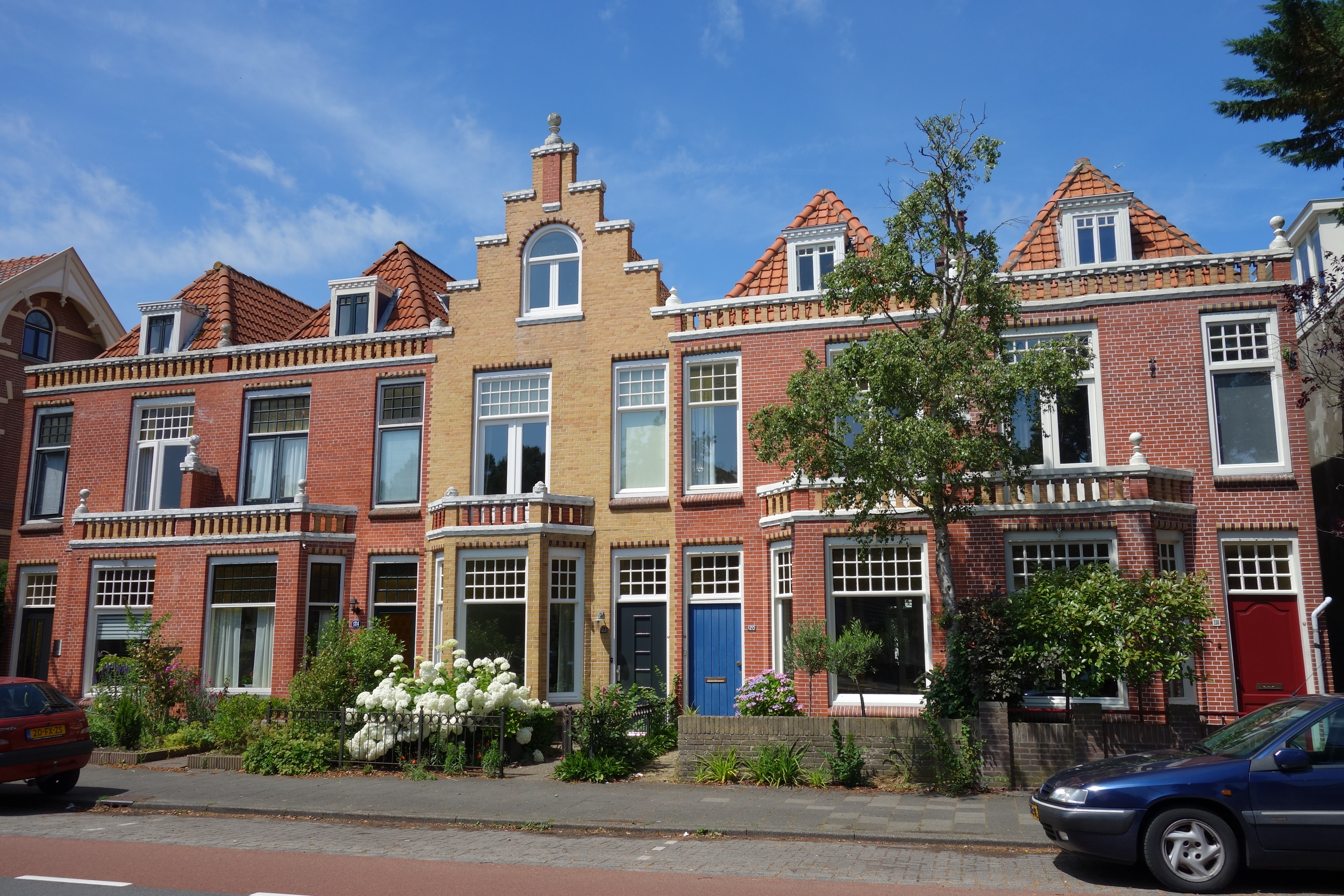
Kennemerstraatweg

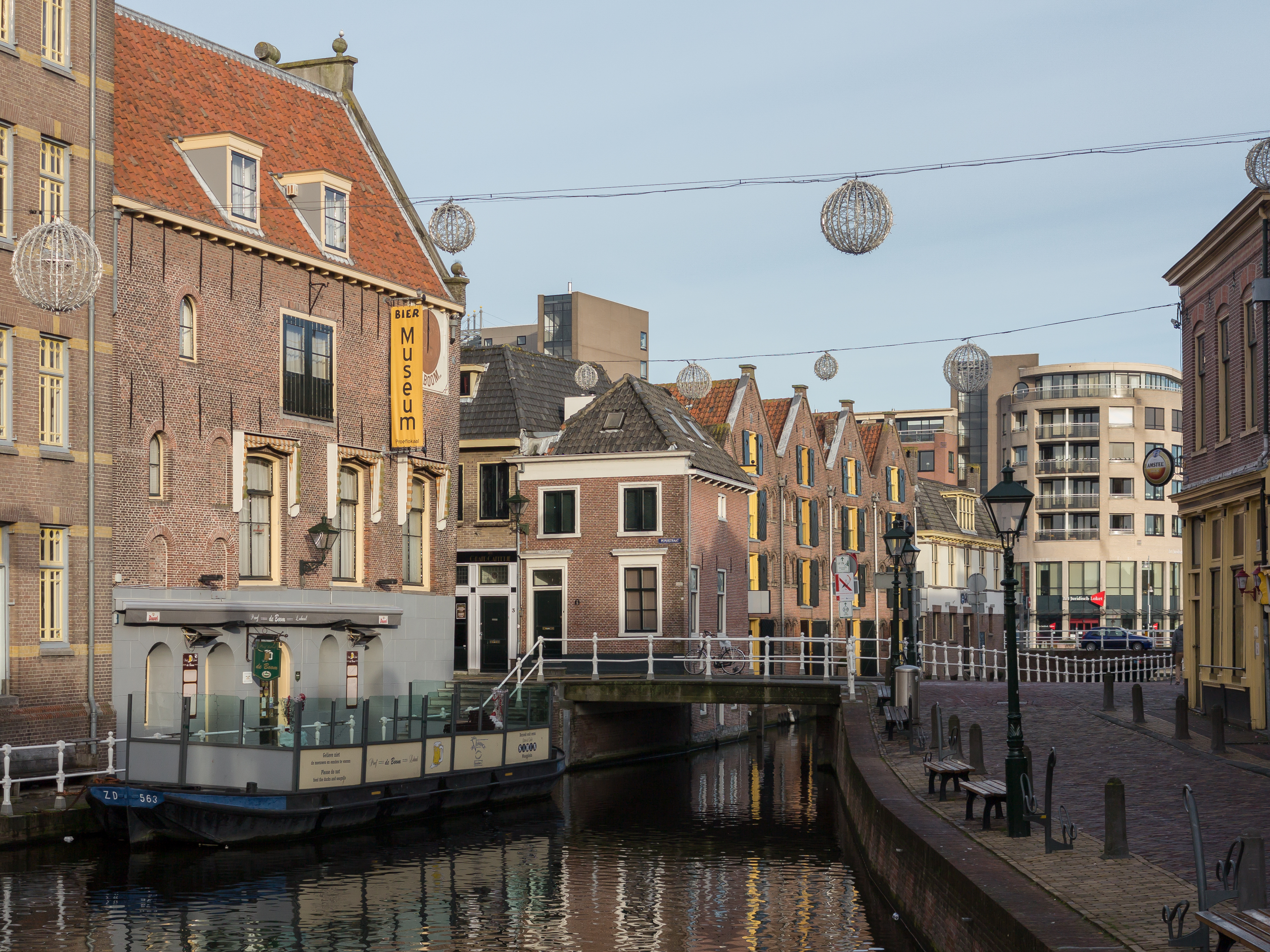
De Mient near the Biermuseum

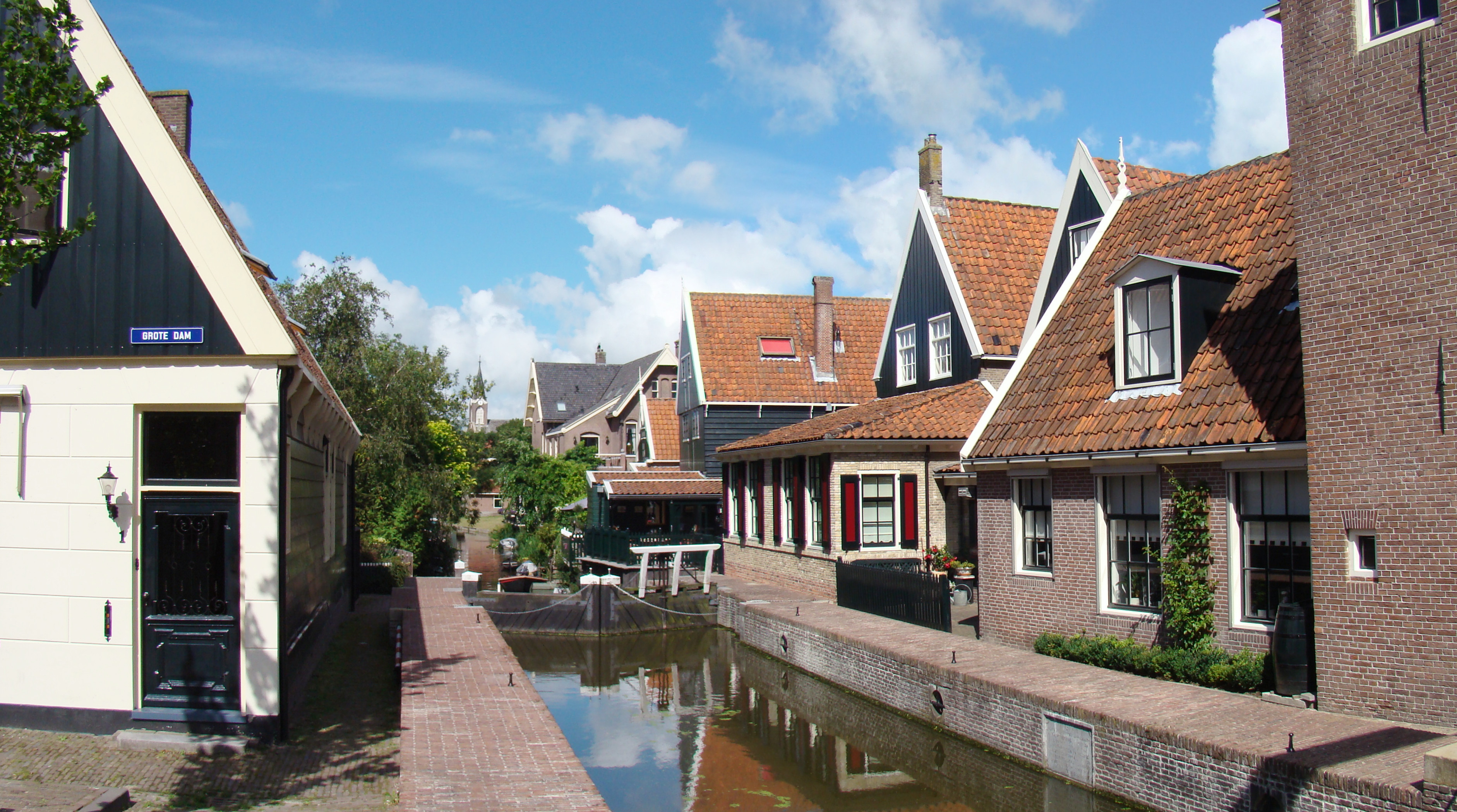
Grote Dam

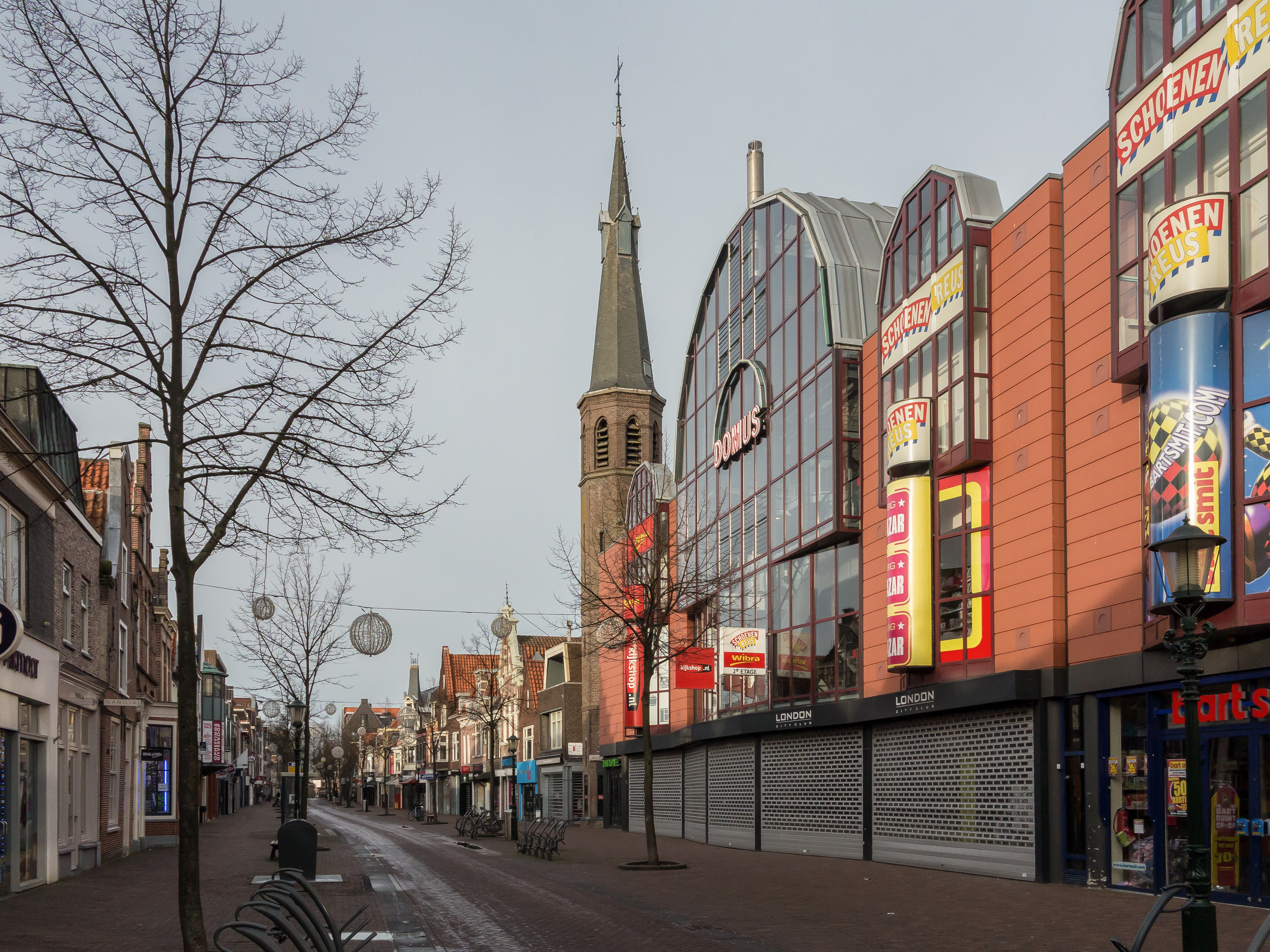
View to a street: De Laat with its former church

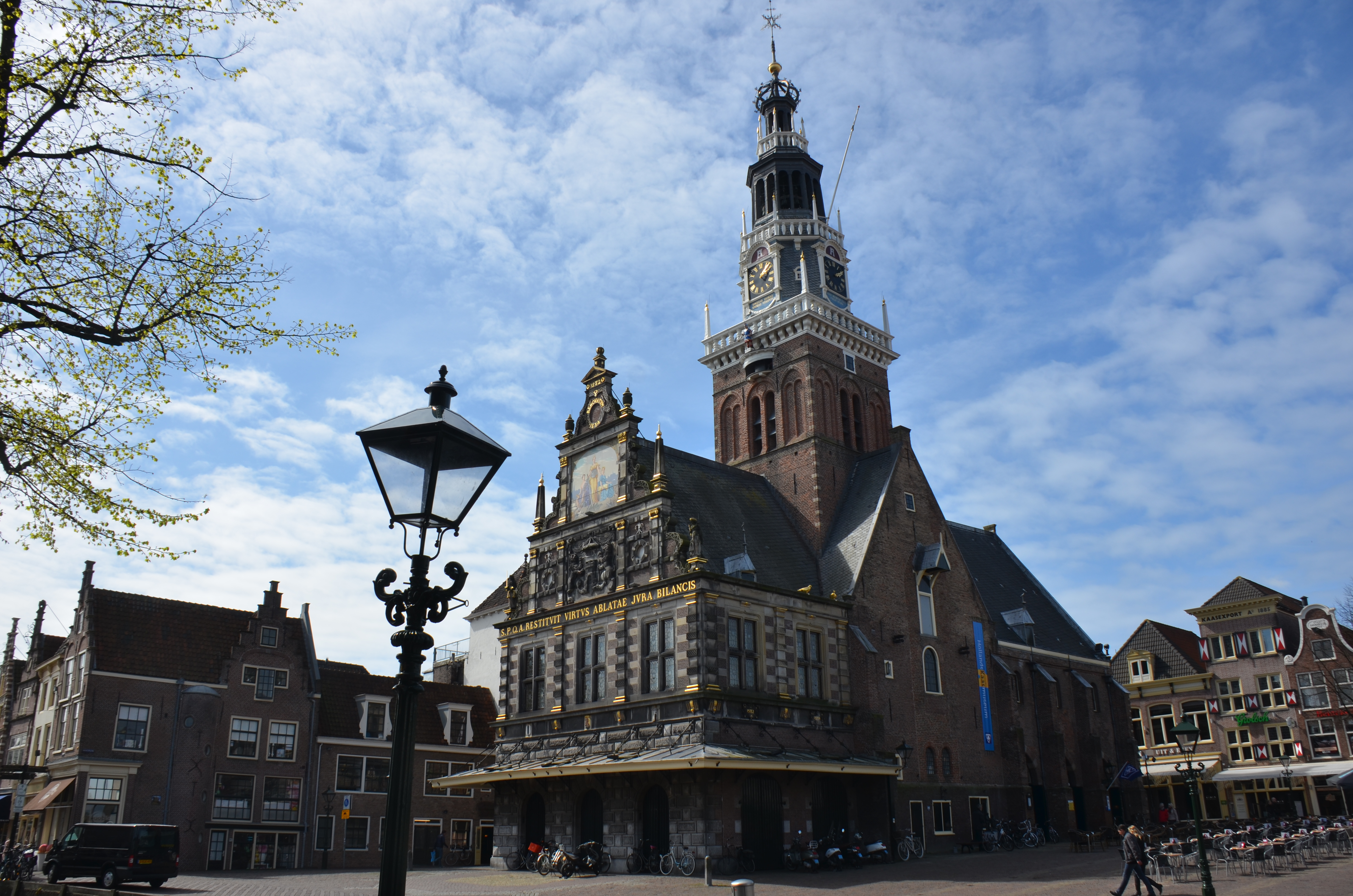
Weighing house (Waag) and cheese museum

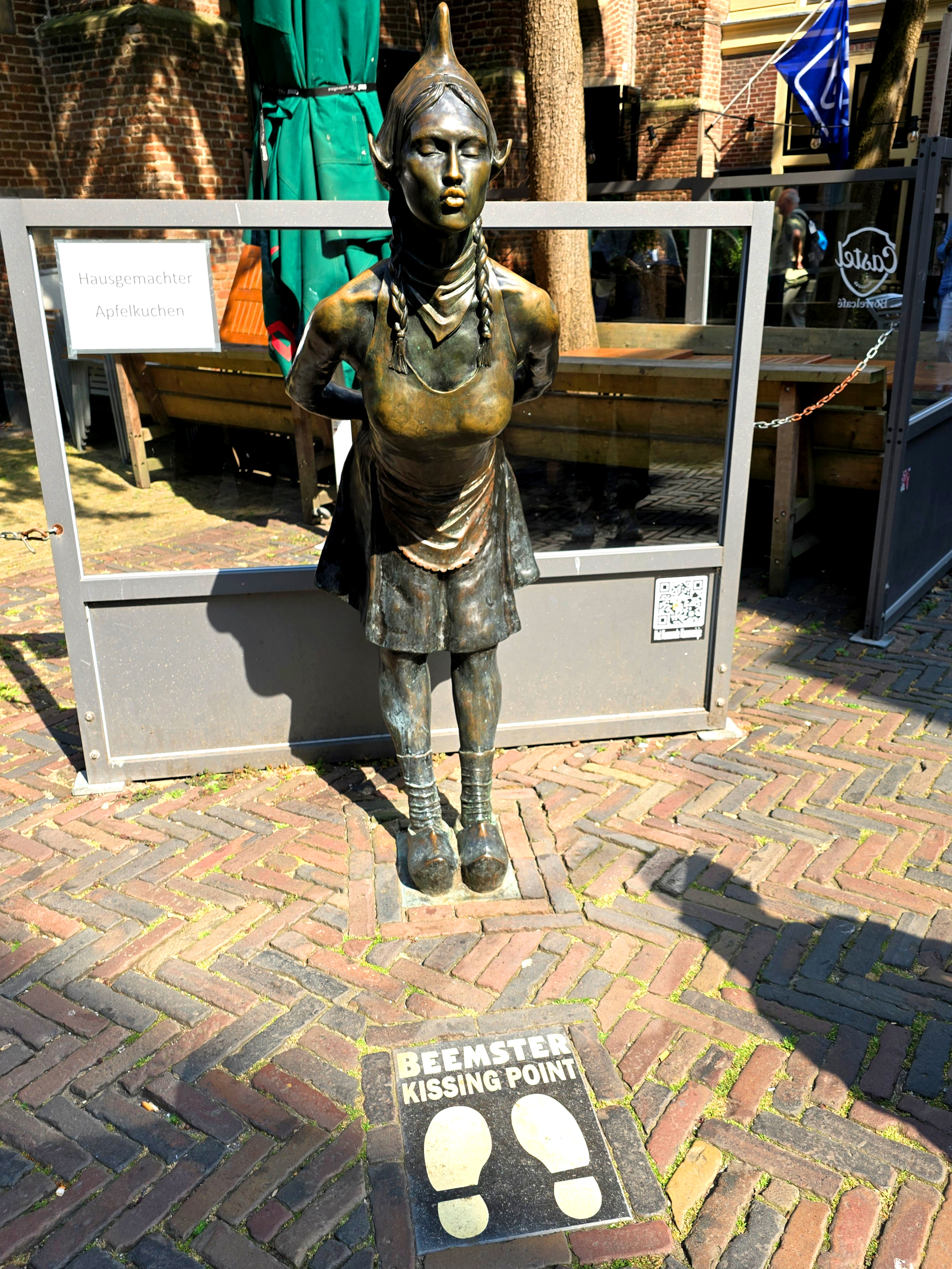
Kissing Cheese Girl statue
