= Berlin Nights Grand Delusions =

Berlin Nights Grand Delusions (Lebenspornografie)
- Directed by: Edwin Brienen
- Written by: Edwin Brienen
- Produced by: Edwin Brienen
- Starring: Esther Eva Verkaaik; Peter Kern; Edwin Brienen; Jean-Louis Costes
- Cinematography: Jacqueline Sobiszewski
- Edited by: Heidi Reuscher
- Music by: Le Syndicat Electronique
- Distributed by: Filmfreak Distribution
- Release date: 2005 (Netherlands)
- Running time: 89 minutes
- Country: Netherlands
- Language: Dutch

Berlin Nights Grand Delusions (Lebenspornografie) (2003) is a feature film written and directed by Dutch director Edwin Brienen. The 89-minutes uncut version contains nudity, pornographic scenes, and a scatological opening sequence by shock performer Jean-Louis Costes. The film was released on DVD in 2008.

== Plot ==
A group of Amsterdam artists try to set up an erotic show in a Berlin nightclub. When the show flops, the group fades away into alcohol abuse and sexual excesses. The Virgin Mary manifests herself to the group and offers them happiness.

== Production ==
Enormous costs, personal affairs and lawsuits about the rights of the film took a total of almost three years before the film had its official German premiere in the Summer of 2005.

== Soundtrack ==
The soundtrack of the film is composed by Le Syndicat Electronique, released on LP through the French electro label Invasion Planète Recordings.
