= Dirk Smorenberg =

Dutch painter

Dirk Smorenberg (September 4, 1883 – September 14, 1960) was a Dutch painter.

Smorenberg was born in Alkmaar, North Holland and started painting professionally in 1906. He is considered as one of the few Dutch Art Deco painters.

He travelled to St. Ives as an artist/painter in the beginning of the World War I. He also worked in Switzerland in Clarens, where his sister lived, not far from Montreux, and in 1910/1911 in the USA. There he exhibited with Piet Mondriaan in New York City. He settled down in the beginning of the twenties in the lake district of Loosdrecht where he lived until he died in September 1960. He painted in a decorative way. The water lilies on the lake were one of his beloved subjects.
