= Black Magic for White Boys =

2017 American comedy film

- Film poster
- Directed by: Onur Tukel
- Written by: Onur Tukel
- Produced by: Gigi Graff
- Starring: Onur Tukel
- Cinematography: Jason Banker
- Release date: April 23, 2017 (Tribeca)
- Running time: 105 minutes
- Country: United States
- Language: English

Black Magic for White Boys is a 2017 American comedy film written by, directed by and starring Onur Tukel. The film premiered at the 2017 Tribeca TV portion of the Tribeca Film Festival.

== Cast ==
- Ronald Guttman as Larry
- Onur Tukel as Oscar
- Charlie LaRose as Chase
- Tavares Jamal Cherry as Bryson
- Eva Dorrepaal as Lucy
- Colin Buckingham as Dean
- Franck Raharinosy as Fred
- Matt Hopkins as Carl at Systems Tech (voice)
- Brendan Miller as Ralphie
- Kevin Corrigan

== Reception ==
The film has an 88% rating on Rotten Tomatoes, based on eight reviews with an average rating of 6.33/10.
