= Lausanne Underground Film and Music Festival =

Coordinates: 46°31′N 6°38′E

The Lausanne Underground Film and Music Festival (LUFF) is a film festival and music festival devoted to underground film and music. It is held each year in Lausanne, Switzerland. The festival is organized by a non-profit organization (APCI – Association pour la Promotion de la Culture Indépendante). The organization's goals are to promote independent artistic projects and creations and to make those projects accessible to a large public. The primary goal of the Lausanne Underground Film & Music Festival is to present films and music that largely exist outside the mainstream and profit driven production and distribution circuits. The cinematic section presents mainly films with an experimental character and/or films that challenge the spectator's viewing habits. Films are screened during the day and evening, followed by live music events featuring underground artists at night. Money prizes are awarded by the festival for the films selected in the international competition, in order to support the filmmakers in creating their art. The musical program of the festival proposes sonar experimentations of all kind.

During the four concert nights of the festival week, an average of twenty international and Swiss musicians and groups play in the Salle des Fêtes of the Casino de Montbenon, the neuralgic center of the festival. In 2012 the festival has considerably enlarged its "off" program (a wide artistic offer free of charge, evolving in parallel to the official program) which continues to grow ever since and participates largely to the festive and open character of the event.
During the five days of the festival, its activities also expand to local venues such as the rock club Le Romandie, the independent movie theater Le Zinéma, the cultural venue La Datcha, the auditorium of the local music school EJMA as well as the book store and art gallery La Librairie Humus, the art gallery Standard Deluxe, the associative photo&cine laboratory "on fait du l'art !", the independent movie theater Bellevaux and use to work with the café-théâtre le Bourg and the center for contemporary art Arsenic.
The annual budget of the festival is of total value about 300.000 Swiss francs (270,000 euros).

== History of the festival ==
Originally called Underground Nights, the festival drew its inspiration from the New York Underground Film Festival. Through its initial, formative years, though, the LUFF developed its own unique program. Starting in its first year with a small screening room that could seat only 30 people, the festival managed to gather more than 1,000 spectators in 2000. In 2002, after a one-year hiatus, the festival moved to Lausanne with the support of the Swiss Film Archive, for the first official edition of the Lausanne Underground Film and Music Festival, drawing 4,000 spectators. By 2013, the festival has drawn around 8000 spectators. By programming an international short and feature films competition while still paying homage to great names of the underground like Nick Zedd, John Waters, Lloyd Kaufman, Ian Kerkhof, Kenneth Anger, Jai Love and the Kuchar brothers; and by organizing musical events featuring such artists as Jimi Tenor, Hanin Elias, Techno Animal, Chicks on Speed, Rhys Chatam, Pansonic and Alan Vega, the LUFF programming now stretches beyond the Swiss borders.

== Festival Editions ==
=== 2023: The Twenty-Second Edition ===
Took place from October 18 to 22, 2023, in Lausanne.

==== Film Awards 2023 ====
- Best Feature FIlm : Hello Dankness, Soda Jerk, Australia, 2023
- Best Short Experimental Films : Birth Proof, Alex Beriault, Germany, 2022 - ex-aequo with Terrifying Holes Compilation, Katherina Aae, Germany, 2021
- Best Short Fiction Film : Dva, Alexandra Karelina, Russia, 2023
- Best Short Animation Film : Tony’s Dilemma, Nathan Sonenfeld, U.S.A., 2023
- Best Short Documentary Film : The Lighting, Chihying Musquiqui, Taiwan, 2021
- Special Mention Short Documentary Film : Speed Date, Jan Soldat, Austria, 2023

=== 2022: The Twenty-First Edition ===
Took place from October 19 to 23, 2022, in Lausanne.

==== Film Awards 2022 ====
- Best Feature Film : Jethica, Pete Ohs, U.S.A., 2022
- Special Mention Feature Film: Beathing Happy, Shane Brady, U.S.A., 2022
- Best Short Experimental Film: SileSilence, Jacques Perconte et Julien Desprez, France, 2022
- Special Mention Short Experimental Film: Enthusiasm, OJOBOCA, Germany, 2022
- Best Short Fiction Film : White Devil, Mariama Diallo, Benjamin Dickinson, U.S.A., 2021
- Best Short Animation Film : Mui, Weng Chon Wong, Macao, 2021
- Best Short Documentary Film : People enjoy my company, Frank Sweeney, Ireland, 2021

=== 2021: The Twentieth Edition ===
Took place from October 20 to 24, 2021, in Lausanne.

==== Film Awards 2021 ====
- Best Feature Film : Sister Tempest, Joe Badon, U.S.A., 2020
- Best Short Experimental Film : Axis of Aion, Takashi Makino & Manuel Knapp, Japan/Austria, 2019
- Best Short Fiction Film : Bad Hair, Oskar Lehemaa, Estonia, 2019
- Special Mention Short Fiction Film : Stuffed, Theo Rhys, United Kingdom, 2021
- Best Short Animation Film : Ghost Dogs, Victoria Vincent, U.S.A., 2019
- Best Short Documentary Film : Just A Guy, Shoko Hars, Germany, 2020

=== 2020: The Nineteenth Edition ===
Took place from October 14 to 18, 2020, in Lausanne.

==== Film Awards 2020 ====
- Best Feature Film : Playdurizm, Gem Deger, Czech Republic, 2020
- Best Short Experimental Film : Hitting My Head on the World, Anna Vasof, Austria, 2019
- Best Short Fiction Film : Museum of Fleeting Wonders, Tomás Gómez Bustillo, U.S.A., 2020
- Best Short Animation Film : Deep Love, Mykyta Lyskov, Ukraine, 2019
- Best Short Documentary Film : Isle of Tears, Boudai12, Hong Kong, 2019

=== 2016: The Fifteenth Edition ===
Took place from October 19 to 23, 2016, in Lausanne.

=== 2015: The Fourteenth Edition ===
Held from October 14 to 18 2015, it has attracted around 13'000 spectators during the five days of film screenings and four concert nights. Among the retrospective programs one dedicated to filmmaker Jeff Perkins presented his Movies for the Blind, a series of intensive recordings of interviews with passengers in his yellow cab from 1995 to 2002.

==== Film Awards 2015 ====
- 2015 - Best Feature Film: Felt by de Jason Banker
- 2015 - Best Short Fiction Film: Notre dame des hormones by Bertrand Mandico
- 2015 - Best Experimental Short Film: Rearranged by Ewa Górzna
- 2015 - Best Short Animation: Pandemonio by Valerio Spinelli
- 2015 - Best Short Documentary: Then Then Then by Daniel Shioler

==== Music line-up 2015 ====
===== Wednesday =====
- Ecoute la merde
- Jacob Kirkegaard plays Else Marie Pade,
- Anti-Ensemble: Imperial Dissolution
- Liturgy
- Jim Haynes

===== Thursday =====
- Nicolas Collins
- C. Spencer Yeh
- Marcus Schmickler
- Pedestrian Deposit
- Mei Zhiyong
- Denis Rollet

===== Friday =====
- Neutral
- Katsura Mouri
- Menace Ruine
- Sissy Spacek
- Lumisokea

===== Saturday =====
- e:ch feat. JinniL
- Sin:Ned feat. Laurent Valdès
- Maria Chavez
- Headwar
- Extreme Precautions
- Sly & The Family Drone

=== 2014: The Thirteenth Edition ===
Was held from 15 to 19 October 2015.

==== Film Awards 2014 ====
- 2014 – Best Feature Film: Buzzard by Joel Potrykus, 2014, USA
- 2014 – Best Short Fiction Film (ex aequo): The Voice Thief by Adan Jodorowski, 2013, CHI, FRA, USA.
- 2014 – Best Short Fiction Film (ex aequo): Straight to Video by Elizabeth Vazquez, 2013, USA
- 2014 – Best Experimental Short Film: Kudryavka Little Ball of Fur by Pikku Kippura, 2013, FIN
- 2014 – Best Short Animation: Wawd Ahp, Stephen Girard, 2013, USA

==== Music line-up 2014 ====
===== Wednesday =====
- Morton Subotnick
- Gordon Monahan: "Speaker Swinging"
- Keith Fullerton Whitman & Mark Fell
- Cédric Dambrain

===== Thursday =====
- Bryan Lewis Saunders & John Duncan
- Tetsuo Furudate
- Aaron Dilloway
- Robert Curgenven
- Les Belles Noiseuses

===== Friday =====
- Dalglish
- Winter Family
- Mohammad
- Cadaver Eyes
- G*Park

===== Saturday =====
- Mario de Vega
- Cobra
- Dustbreeders & Junko
- Black Zenith
- Kuro Pipe

=== 2013: The Twelfth Edition ===
The twelfth edition of the festival (October 16 to 20 2013) featured a total of 98 films. Retrospective programs featured works by Japanese surrealist filmmaker Katsu Kanai, French actor-filmmaker Pierre Clémenti, French punk author, musician and filmmaker F. J. Ossang, Russian independent filmmaker Andrey Iskanov, Polish filmmaker Walerian Borowczyk and Belgian filmmaker Marcel Broodthaers as well as a carte blanche program to Jello Biafra. The international film competition included five feature films and 18 short films. The music part included 24 concerts for the total of four concert nights. The program presented sets by artists such as Emptyset, Endon, The Haxan Cloak, Vomir, Kracoon, Sugar Craft, Sajjanu, Jello Biafra, Fen (Far East Network: Otomo Yoshihide, Ryu Hankil, Yuen Chee Wal, Yan Jun), Nate Young, Blackphone666, Aluk Todolo, Jason Lescalleet, JG Thirwell, Bryan Lewis Saunders, Leif Elggren, Jean-François Laporte, Evil Moisture, Smegma, Nicolas Bernier & Martin Messier, Kiko C. Esseiva and DJ Nozinja. A total of 58 artists (musicians and filmmakers) were present during the five days of the festival to present their works.

The twelfth edition of the Lausanne Underground Film & Music Festival also proposed a range of workshops, aiming to introduce spectators to new or little known artistic techniques. The five workshops were held by artists such as the South-African group Shangaan Dance, Japanese decoupage artist Kosuke Kawamura, Canadian experimental musician Jean-François Laporte, Japanese noise musician Endon and French musician and artist Andy Bolus.

The program of the festival also included an off part featuring the festival's own radio station (LUFF.FM), expositions and various artistic performances all through the five days of the festival.

==== Film Awards 2013 ====
- 2013 – Best Feature Film: Worm by Andrew Bowser
- 2013 – Best Short Fiction Film: Fist of Jesus by David Munoz
- 2013 – Best Experimental Short Film: Autoportrait: Presto con Amore by Martin Messier

==== Music line-up 2013 ====
===== Wednesday =====
- Nozinja
- Jean-François Laporte "Rust"
- Kiko C. Esseiva
- Nicolas Bernier & Martin Messier "la chambre des machines"
- Smegma & Kosuke Kawamura
- Evil Moisture
- Jean-François Laporte "Mantra"

===== Thursday =====
- Leif Elggren
- Bryan Lewis Saunders
- JG Thirlwell (Foetus):"Cholera Nocebo"
- Jason Lescalleet
- Aluk Todolo
- Blackphone666

===== Friday =====
- Nate Young
- FEN
- Jello Biafra & Ravi Shardja & Anton Mobin
- Sajjanu
- Sugarcraft

===== Saturday =====
- Vomir
- The Haxan Cloak
- ENDON
- Emptyset

=== 2012: The Eleventh Edition ===
For the eleventh edition of the festival (October 17–21, 2012) John Waters was invited to present his one Man show "This Filthy World", a vaudeville act that celebrates his film career and obsessional tastes, and to present a retrospective of four of his early films as well as a selection of four of his favorite films. Other retrospectives included works by Austrian filmmaker and writer Christoph Schlingensief, Richard Stanley and Dutch provocateur Edwin Brienen. The international competition included five feature films and 28 short films. 21 musical performances were held during the four concert nights, featuring artists such as Pain Jerk, Brutal Truth, Fat32, rm, Blectum From Blechdom, Kim Gordon, Bill Nace, Maja S. K. Ratkje, Ikue Mori, Greg Pope, Gilles Aubry, Radian, Cellule d'Intervention Metamkine, Kevin Drumm, Thomas Ankersmit, Michael Esposito, Mattin, Zeni Geva, Arcangel Constantini, Yan Jun.

==== Film Awards 2012 ====
- 2012 – Best Feature Film: Toad Road by Jason Banker
- 2012 – Best Short Fiction Film: Boro in the Box by Bertrand Mandico
- 2012 – Best Short Animation: Bobby Yeah by Robert Morgan
- 2012 – Best Short Experimental: Six Hundred and Forty-one Slates by Don Swaynos

==== Music line-up 2012 ====
===== Wednesday =====
- Yan Jun
- Arcangel Constantini
- Zeni Geva
- MATTIN
- Michael Esposito

===== Thursday =====
- Thomas Ankersmit
- Kevin Drumm
- Cellule d'intervention Metamkine
- Radian, Marzouk & Barrier & Degouts
- Gilles Aubry

===== Friday =====
- Greg Pope: "light trap"
- Maja S. K. Ratkje & Ikue Mori
- Body/Head: Kim Gordon & Bill Nace
- Blectum From Blechdom
- rm

===== Saturday =====
- FAT32
- Oi Polloi (censored by the authorities of the city of Lausanne)
- Brutal Truth plays Robert Pietrowicz
- Pain Jerk

=== 2012: LUFF does TOKYO / FEEDBACK TOKYO ===
At the occasion of the tenth edition, the festival held a special anniversary edition in Tokyo, Japan through an exchange program line-up between the festival, the livehouse Super-Deluxe (Tokyo) and the team of dEnOISE events, Uplink Factory and Image Forum Festival. This one time only exchange was held from April 27 to May 4, 2012 and featured movies from Peter Liechti, Emmanuelle de Riedmatten, Stephan E. Hauser among many others. A website in Japanese, English and French was made for the occasion : http://tokyo.luff.ch.

==== Music line-up ====
===== 27 April 2012 @ UPLINK =====
- CINE-NOISE
- Sachiko M plays on the movie The Magic of Decay... Decay of the Magic by Stefan E. Hauser

===== 28 April 2012 @ Super-Deluxe (dEnOISE 4) =====
- [sic]
- Schimpfluch-Gruppe
- OFFSEASON & Yudayajazz
- Takashi Nemoto VS Kosuke Kawamura
- Kleptomaniac + Atsuhiro Ito
- Kuruucrew feat. Hair Stylistics
- Pain Jerk feat. Taichi Nagura
- Zbigniew Karkowski feat. Daniel Buess

===== 29 April 2012 @ Super-Deluxe (dEnOISE 5) =====
- Jim O'Rourke feat. Norber Möslang
- ASTRO & Dave Phillips
- Francisco Meirino
- d'Incise
- CARRE feat. Strotter Inst.
- Kiko C. Esseiva
- Hijokaidan feat. HIKO
- MARUOSA vs Syndrome WPW
- DJ Marc Robert

=== 2011: The Tenth Edition ===
The tenth edition of the festival was held from October 19 to 23 2011.

==== Film Awards 2011 ====
- 2011 - Best Short Feature Length Film: The Oregonian by Calvin Reeder
- 2011 - Best Short Animation: Miss Candace Hilligoss’ Flickering Halo by Fabio Scacchioli & Vincenzo Core
- 2011 - Best Short Experimental: Slick Horsing by Kiron Hussain

==== Music line-up 2011 ====
===== Spécial opening @ Les DOCKS =====
- Diamanda Galas (organized with Les DOCKS as opening night the week-end before the festival.)

===== Wednesday =====
- David Dunn
- Nurse With Wound
- Z'ev
- ART ERROR IST

===== Thursday =====
- Dragos Tara – PIXEL
- Insub Meta Orchestra & Kasper T. Toeplitz – _INSUB_
- Chop Shop – OXIDE
- Rudolf Eb.er
- Hair Stylistics
- Kasper T. Toeplitz

===== Friday =====
- Diversion I: Gudrun Gut, Jou, Pierre Audétat, Bacalao
- Thiaz Itch
- Kuruucrew
- Maruosa

===== Saturday =====
- Pivixki + Marco Fusinato
- Alva Noto
- Byetone
- Broken Note

=== 2010: The Ninth Edition ===
The tenth edition of the festival was held from October 20 to 24 2010.

==== Film Awards 2010 ====
- 2010 - Best Short Fiction Film: You're the Stranger Here by Tom Geens
- 2010 - Best Short Animation: Oranus by Jelena Girlin and Mari-Liis Bassovskaja
- 2010 - Best Short Experimental: M by Felix Dufour-Laperriere

==== Music line-up 2010 ====
===== Wednesday =====
- Michael Gendreau
- Valerio Tricoli
- The sons of god
- Carl-Michael von Hausswolff
- Robert Piotrowicz

===== Thursday =====
- Monster War
- Gerritt Wittmer
- Ramleh
- Hijokaidan
- Evol
- Tujiko Noriko + Lawrence English + John Chantler (@ Le Bourg)

===== Friday =====
- Gu Guai Xing Qiu
- Discharge
- Incapacitants
- Les Trucs
- GTUK

===== Saturday =====
- Fennesz
- Oneohtrix Point Never
- Starkey
- Enduser + Nicolas Chevreux
- Cindy Talk, Bruce Gilbert (@ Le Bourg)
- rm (@ Le Bourg)

=== 2009: The Eighth Edition ===
This edition was held from October 14 to 18 2009

==== Music line-up 2009 ====
===== Wednesday =====
- Chikanari Shukuka
- The Haters
- Damion Romero
- Michael Gendreau
- rm

===== Thursday =====
- Oren Ambarchi & Robbie Avenaim
- Tony Conrad & Keiji Haino
- Sister Iodine
- Norbert Möslang
- rm

===== Friday =====
- Kania Tieffer
- Ben Et Béné
- Planningtorock
- OFFSEASON
- Jankenpopp
- Unas

===== Saturday =====
- Solid Black Night
- Sunn O
- Scorn
- Jamie Vex'd
- King Cannibal

=== 2008: The Seventh Edition ===
Held from October 15 to 19 2008.

==== Music line-up 2008 ====
===== Wednesday =====
- Zeek Sheck
- MoHa !
- Joe Colley
- Skullflower
- Deathroes
- Tralphaz

===== Thursday =====
- Ilios
- Sum or R
- Haswell & Hecker
- Corrupted with Tsurisaki Kiyotaka
- Dave Phillips

===== Friday =====
- Daniel Buess & Zbigniew Karkowksi
- Charlemagne Palestine
- Karl Lemieux Project
- Jackie O'Motherfucker
- DJ Elephant Power

===== Saturday =====
- Opérateur Fotokopieur
- Jean-Jacques Perrey & David Chazam
- Radioactive Man
- Tara Delong
- DJ Scotch Egg (canceled)
- Eat Rabbit

=== 2007: The Sixth Edition ===
Held from October 10 to 14 in Swiss Film Archive, Arsenic and Zinéma.

==== Music line-up 2007 ====
===== Wednesday =====
- Dorit Chrysler & Gibby Haynes
- Borbetomagus
- Lydia Luch & Les Aus
- No Bra

===== Thursday =====
- Jazkamer
- Astro + Reiko A. + PHROQ
- The Skull Defekts
- Antimatter & Zbigniew Karkowksi

===== Friday =====
- Fuckhead
- Skindrone
- Gert-Jan Prins
- Kap Bambino
- Sang Bleu

===== Saturday =====
- Ghislain Poirier
- Sixtoo
- Milanese
- Cursor Miner
- [sic]

=== 2006: The Fifth Edition ===
The fifth edition of LUFF (October 11–15, 2006) featured a look at Viennese Actionism, a retrospective on Jonas Mekas, a program titled sXprmntl selected by Roland Lethem with films by Thierry Zéno, Philippe Caufriez, Patrice Bauduinet, and Patrick Hella, as well as a series by Jean-Jacques Rousseau. Musical events included Genesis P-Orridge, Lydia Lunch, John Duncan, The Haters, Gabi Delgado, Kid 606, Spectre, and more.

==== Film Awards 2006 ====
- 2006 - Best Feature: Threat by Matt Pizzolo and Katie Nisa
- 2006 - Best Short Film: Memory Lapse by Scott Amos
- 2006 - Best Experimental Film: Emerge by Stephane Broc

==== Music line-up 2006 ====
===== Wednesday =====
- Thee Majety
- Neue Weltumfassende Resistance
- Lydia Lunch: real pornography
- Antoine Chessex

===== Thursday =====
- The Haters
- John Duncan
- S.S.S. with Atau Tanaka
- Randy H.Y. Yau
- Scott Arford
- Infrasound
- Column One
- The MERJ Experience presents MATIERE

===== Friday =====
- Felix Kubin and Pia Burnette
- Superalisa
- Quintron & Miss Pussycat
- Kissogram
- Egotronic
- Live video by la SUPERMAFIA

===== Saturday =====
- KID 606
- DJ Rupture + Filastine
- Shadow Huntaz
- Sensational + Kouheikoyxen + Spectre
- Hidden_K

=== 2005: The Fourth Edition ===
October 12 to 16 2005

==== Film Awards 2005 ====
- 2005 - Best Feature: Die You Zombie bastards ! by Caleb Emerson
- 2005 - Best Short Film: Clean by Geoffrey Engelbrecht
- 2005 - Best Experimental Film: Grau by Robert Seidl and Fiddler's Green by Jean-Claude Campell and Marco Bowald

==== Music line-up 2005 ====
===== Wednesday =====
- Masonna
- Zbigniew Karkowski + Atsuko Nojiri
- Daniel Menche
- Dear Daniel & Michael...
- Dave Phillips
- Sudden Infant
- Justice Yeldham & the Dynamic Ribbon Device
- G*Park

===== Thursday =====
- Francisco Meirino
- Francisco Lopez
- Pita & Jade
- Vladislav Delay
- Mystery Frequency

===== Friday =====
- The Licks
- Etant Donnés
- Alan Vega
- Melt-Banana
- James d'O

===== Saturday =====
- Jo la Noize
- Syndrome WPW
- Special Event: A*Class (Gina V. D'Orio vs Patric Catani, ex EC8OR)
- DAT Politics
- Candie Hank aka Patric Catani
- Deknoid

=== 2004: The Third Edition ===
October 13 to 17 2004

==== Music line-up 2004 ====
===== Wednesday =====
- Dolores Dewberry
- Jean-Louis Costes Show
- Tujiko Noriko
- Whitehouse
- PHROQ

===== Thursday =====
- Les poissons autistes
- Pan Sonic
- Merzbow
- Hecate

===== Friday =====
- Disco Doom
- Rhys Chatham project
- Tempsion
- DJ's ZOB + ESC

===== Saturday =====
- Surprise Tricycle Evolutif: Wild Guy
- Mignon
- Jacqui & Flow
- Chicks on Speed

=== 2003 : The Second Edition ===
October 8 to 12 2003

==== Music line-up 2003 ====
===== Wednesday =====
- Reverse Engineering
- Techno Animal
- Asifuoxyd
- DJ ZOB + ESC

===== Thursday =====
- Kunst
- Fatal: Hanin Elias+C.H.I.F.F.R.E.+Philipp Virus
- DJ Lincé

===== Friday =====
- Performance cinématographique
- Monno
- Dermehr Gauner

===== Saturday =====
- Digitaline
- Mouse on Mars
- DJ Sonja Moonear

=== 2002: The First Edition ===
The first edition of the festival was held from June 5 to 9 2002.

==== Music line-up 2002 ====
===== Wednesday =====
- Jimi Tenor

===== Thursday =====
- "Plug me in" music by Add N To (x)
- Nimby
- Hexstatic
- Lektrogirl
- DJ Jobot

===== Friday =====
- Otaslogi.c
- Scanner
- Kippu

===== Saturday =====
- The Never Evers
- One Dimensional Man
- DJ Lars

== See also ==
- New York Underground Film Festival
- (in French) Category:Festival de cinéma en Suisse
- (in French) Category:Cinéma expérimental
- (in French) Category:Film underground
- (in French) Category:Lausanne
