= Edwin Brienen =

Dutch film director, actor & producer (born 1971)

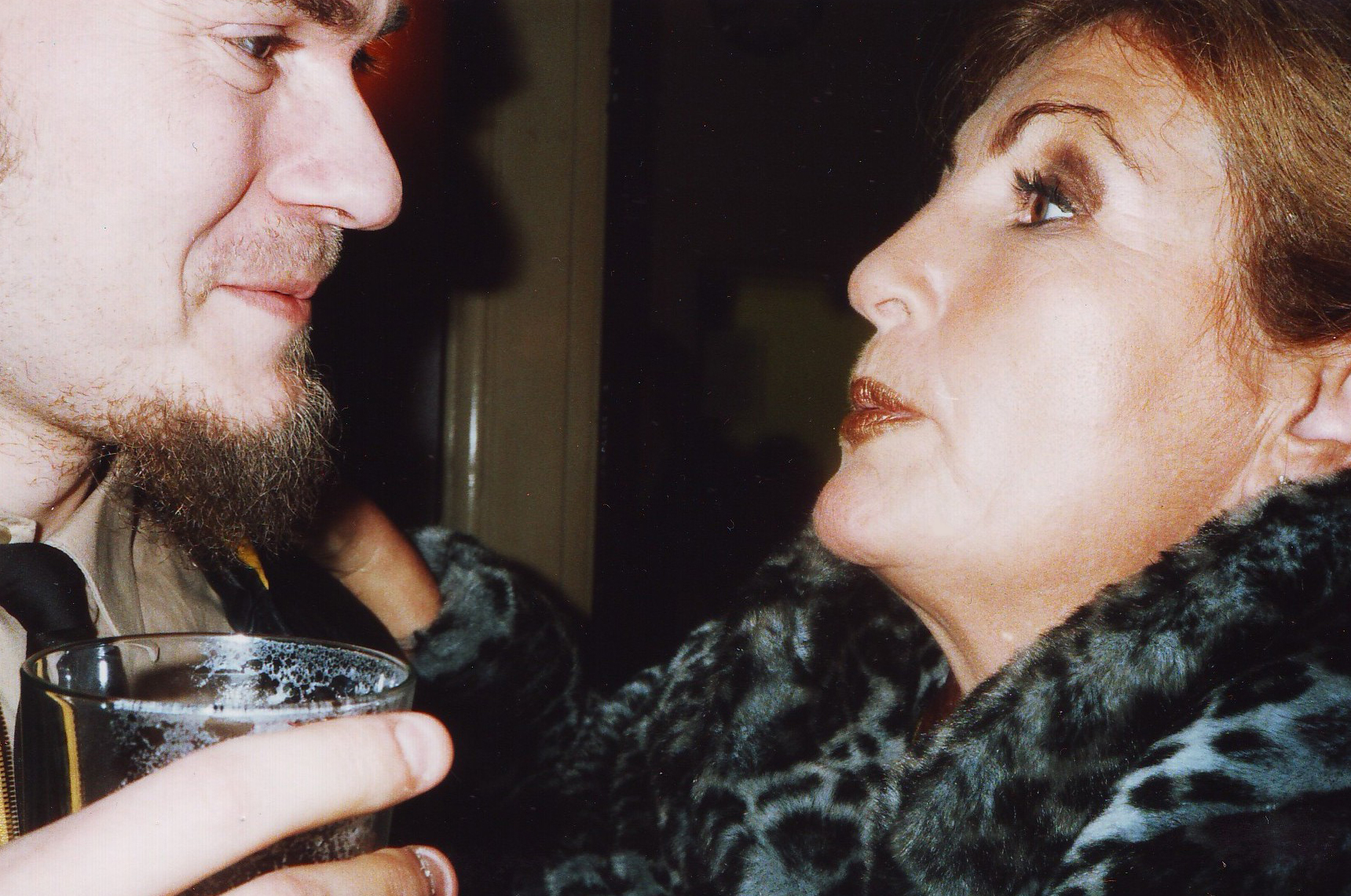
Edwin Brienen (left)

Edwin Brienen (born June 15, 1971 in Alkmaar, Netherlands) is a Dutch film director, actor, producer, journalist and radio moderator. In German press he's often called 'the Dutch Fassbinder' because of the high production-level and style of his films. He lives in Berlin, Germany.

== Biography ==
After studying philosophy and psychology, Edwin Brienen embarked on a career as a radio host at the age of 22. His programs for Dutch broadcasting association VPRO attracted a nationwide following. On television he starred in the underground series Ultra Vista!. For television he directed the shows Buch, Burgers & Buitenlui and Hoe Hoort het Eigenlijk? with Theo van Gogh. In 2001, he wrote, directed, and edited his debut feature film Terrorama!, a dark story about a group of dispirited people who seek out 'psychological freedom' by committing an act of terror. A year later, Brienen returned to VPRO and, in September 2001, he created a series about the New York underground scene.

Brienen's fourth feature, Both Ends Burning, premiered during the Brienen Festival in 14 Dutch theaters in January 2005. The film probes the underbelly of relationships and is suffused with an atmosphere reminiscent of French cinema of the '70s but also contains bone-chilling moments that recall Carrie and Repulsion. In 2005, Arte TV broadcast a documentary about Brienen in which they compared his work and intensity with Kubrick's A Clockwork Orange.

Last Performance (2006) and Revision – Apocalypse II (2009) both premiere at the Netherlands Film Festival in Utrecht. In 2008, Brienen works together with Austrian actor Erwin Leder known from the 1981 classic Das Boot as directed by Wolfgang Petersen. The result is called L'amour toujours and Leder plays an obsessed director that resembles Brienen. Two German spoken films are released in 2009 and 2011: Viva Europa! about the revolutions of 1989 and Lena Wants to Know Once and For All, a melancholic comedy about the search for love.

In October 2012, the Lausanne Underground Film and Music Festival in Switzerland honoured Brienen by presenting a retrospective of his films, including the world premiere of Exploitation.

December 2016 saw the premiere of Brienen's 15th feature film, God. It's a story about striptease dancer Alice, whose boyfriend is hunted by a corrupt political regime after leaking secret government documents. Stuck in a web of intrigue and violent threats, a nun confronts Alice with her stubborn dogmatism. The film got nominated for "best narrative feature" at the Great Lakes Film Festival in 2017. That same year, the prestigious Centrum Filmowe Kraków presented an Edwin Brienen film retrospective. Thereafter, Brienen took two years off to write on his debut novel. In 2020 he returned with a short film, Accidents Never Happen in a Perfect World, shot during the pandemic lockdown.

== Filmography ==
- 2020 Accidents Never Happen in a Perfect World (short)
- 2016 God
- 2012 Exploitation
- 2011 Lena Wants to Know Once and For All
- 2010 Revision - Apocalypse II
- 2009 Viva Europa!
- 2009 Phantom Party
- 2008 L'amour toujours
- 2007 I'd Like to Die a Thousand Times
- 2006 Last Performance
- 2006 Hysteria
- 2005 Why Ulli Wanted to Kill Himself on Christmas Eve
- 2004 Both Ends Burning
- 2003 Berlin Nights Grand Delusions
- 2002 Antifilm
- 2001 Terrorama
