= Revision – Apocalypse II =

Revision - Apocalypse II
- Directed by: Edwin Brienen
- Screenplay by: Edwin Brienen
- Produced by: Edwin Brienen
- Starring: Eva Dorrepaal; Clayton Nemrow; Jacob Dove Basker; Oliver Chesler; Valerie Renay; Simon Werner
- Cinematography: Fabian Aust
- Edited by: Daniela Boch
- Music by: Vincent Koreman
- Distributed by: MVD Visual (US); Filmfreak Distribution (Benelux)
- Release date: December 16, 2009 (Clair-Obscur Film Festival)
- Running time: 80 minutes
- Countries: US; Germany; Netherlands
- Language: English

Revision – Apocalypse II is a 2009 drama/ horror film written and directed by Edwin Brienen. The film is an international co-production of Germany, Netherlands and the United States and celebrated its premiere at the Netherlands Film Festival in 2010.

== Plot ==
A government-controlled society. Former nude model Traci (Eva Dorrepaal) has lost her grip on reality. She feels threatened by an invisible force, a ‘Big Brother’. Under influence of her photographer husband Charlie (Clayton Nemrow), she rejects God and surrenders herself to the ultimate act of evil: murder. Outside the streets are burning. The return of a false Messiah causes destruction and chaos. Haunted by her inner-demon (Jacob Dove Basker), Traci slowly sinks into madness.

== Soundtrack ==
All music was written and performed by the House of Destructo, a project of Dutch producer Vincent Koreman. The Horrorist makes an appearance with the song ‘Sex Machine’.

== Critical response ==
"Inappropriate? Monstrous? Or is it crossing borders? And simply brilliant? It actually all fits: 'Revision' is eccentric and over-the-top. Brienen belongs to a small group of directors: you can love him and hate him at the same time." -Filmkrant, Netherlands

== DVD ==
European Filmfreak Distribution released the film in 2010. A North-American DVD release is scheduled for 21 August 2012 through MVD Visual.
