= List of members of the House of Representatives of the Netherlands for 50Plus =

Ten politicians have represented 50Plus in the House of Representatives.

On 3 June 2014 the two members of 50PLUS, Martine Baay-Timmerman and Norbert Klein, split from each other, creating two parliamentary groups. Both one-man groups claimed to represent 50PLUS, creating the parliamentary groups fractie 50PLUS/Klein and fractie 50PLUS/Baay, although the party 50PLUS supported the latter. This situation ended when Klein renounced 50PLUS in the group name on 12 November 2014.

== List ==
Member	Term start	Term end	Ref.
Martine Baay-Timmerman	29 October 2013	9 September 2014	
Corrie van Brenk	23 March 2017	30 March 2021	
Corrie van Brenk	12 November 2025		
Simon Geleijnse	7 November 2018	26 February 2019	
Simon Geleijnse	12 March 2019	25 June 2019	
Liane den Haan	31 March 2021	11 May 2021 (Note: Left parliamentary group and continued as independent.)	
Norbert Klein	20 September 2012	13 November 2014 (Note: Left parliamentary group and continued as independent.)	
Henk Krol	20 September 2012	4 October 2013	
Henk Krol	10 September 2014	3 May 2020 (Note: Left the parliamentary group and continued in Groep Krol/van Kooten-Arissen)	
Gerrit-Jan van Otterloo	11 June 2019	30 March 2021	
Martin van Rooijen	23 March 2017	10 June 2019	
Léonie Sazias	23 March 2017	6 November 2018	
Léonie Sazias	27 February 2019	6 March 2019	
Léonie Sazias	27 June 2019	30 March 2021	
Jan Struijs	12 November 2025		
