= 2011 Dutch provincial elections =

Election board in Groningen

Largest party by province

Provincial elections were held in the Netherlands on Wednesday 2 March 2011. Eligible voters elected the members of the provincial councils in the twelve provinces. These elections also indirectly determined the members of the Senate, since the 566 members of the twelve provincial councils elected the Senate's 75 members in the Senate election on 23 May 2011.

The Senate election, and therefore the provincial elections, were important since the first Rutte cabinet had a minority in the Senate when it took office. The coalition and support parties hoped to gain a majority in the Senate through these elections, but failed to do so, obtaining 37 out of 75 seats. However, it was expected that the Reformed Political Party, which obtained one seat, would support the cabinet.

On the same date, Island Council elections were held in the three public bodies of the Caribbean Netherlands. It was planned that the members of the Island Councils would also have a vote in the Senate election in the future, but in 2011 this was not yet the case because this required a change in the Constitution.

== Results ==
The right-liberal People's Party for Freedom and Democracy, left-liberal Democrats 66, and right-wing Party for Freedom made significant gains throughout the provinces. The Labour Party stayed relatively stable, while the Socialist Party suffered losses from their 2007 results. The Christian Democratic Appeal suffered big losses, losing some 65 of their previous 151 provincial seats. However, the party did not fare as poorly as the polls had suggested.

This was the first provincial elections that Geert Wilders' Party for Freedom participated in. The party managed to win seats in all of the Netherlands' provinces with its best results in the southern provinces of North Brabant and Limburg. In Limburg it even managed to become the biggest party by a slim margin.

=== National results ===
Party	Seats		
Party	2007	2011	+/–
People's Party for Freedom and Democracy	102	112	+10
Labour Party	114	107	−7
Christian Democratic Appeal	151	86	−65
Party for Freedom	0	69	+69
Socialist Party	83	56	−27
Democrats 66	9	42	+33
GroenLinks	33	34	+1
Christian Union	35	23	−12
Reformed Political Party	13	12	−1
50PLUS	0	9	New
Party for the Animals	8	7	−1
Christian Union – Reformed Political Party	3	1	−2
Frisian National Party	5	4	−1
Party for Zeeland	2	2	0
ONH–VSP	1	1	0
Party for the North	1	1	0
Party New Limburg	1	0	−1
Beautiful Utrecht	1	0	−1
Other parties	2	0	−2
Total	564	566	+2

Due to population growth in Gelderland, the number of seats in the Provincial Council of Gelderland increased from 53 to 55, accounting for the increase in the total number of seats from 564 to 566.

== By province ==
Province	Number of seats per party												
Province	VVD	PvdA	CDA	PVV	SP	D66	GL	CU	SGP	50+	PvdD	remaining	total
Groningen	6	12	5	3	6	3	3	3	-	0	1	1	43
Friesland	6	11	8	4	3	2	2	3	-	0	-	4	43
Drenthe	9	12	6	4	4	2	2	2	0	0	-	0	41
Overijssel	8	9	11	4	4	3	2	3	2	1	0	0	47
Flevoland	9	6	4	6	3	3	2	3	1	1	1	0	39
Gelderland	11	9	9	6	5	4	4	3	2	1	1	0	55
Utrecht	11	7	6	5	4	5	4	2	1	1	1	0	47
North Holland	13	11	5	6	5	6	5	1		1	1	1	55
South Holland	12	10	6	8	5	5	3	2	2	1	1	0	55
Zeeland	7	7	6	5	3	2	1	2	4	0	0	2	39
North Brabant	12	7	10	8	8	5	3	0		1	1	0	55
Limburg	8	6	10	10	6	2	3	0	-	2	0	0	47
Total	112	107	86	69	56	42	34	23	12	9	7	8	566
Total	112	107	86	69	56	42	34	1		9	7	8	566

A "-" in the table means that the relevant party did not submit a list of candidates in the 2011 elections in the province concerned.

=== Drenthe ===
Party	Votes	%	Seats	+/–
Labour Party	59,053	26.51	12	−1
People's Party for Freedom and Democracy	42,255	18.97	9	+1
Christian Democratic Appeal	32,518	14.60	6	−4
Party for Freedom	21,920	9.84	4	New
Socialist Party	21,627	9.71	4	−1
Democrats 66	13,850	6.22	2	+2
Christian Union	11,857	5.32	2	−1
GroenLinks	11,734	5.27	2	0
Other parties	7,920	3.56	0	–
Total	222,734	100.00	41	–
Valid votes	222,734	99.75		
Invalid/blank votes	559	0.25		
Total votes	223,293	100.00		
Registered voters/turnout	380,661	58.66		
Source: Kiesraad

=== Flevoland ===
Party	Votes	%	Seats	+/–
People's Party for Freedom and Democracy	34,038	22.92	9	0
Labour Party	23,671	15.94	6	−1
Party for Freedom	22,222	14.96	6	New
Christian Democratic Appeal	15,740	10.60	4	−4
Socialist Party	12,904	8.69	3	−3
Democrats 66	9,755	6.57	3	+3
Christian Union	8,747	5.89	3	−2
GroenLinks	8,463	5.70	2	0
Reformed Political Party	4,875	3.28	1	0
50PLUS	3,770	2.54	1	New
Party for the Animals	3,408	2.29	1	0
Other parties	926	0.62	0	–
Total	148,519	100.00	39	–
Valid votes	148,519	99.72		
Invalid/blank votes	417	0.28		
Total votes	148,936	100.00		
Registered voters/turnout	278,039	53.57		
Source: Kiesraad

=== Friesland ===
Party	Votes	%	Seats	+/–
Labour Party	70,337	23.66	11	−1
Christian Democratic Appeal	52,530	17.67	8	−4
People's Party for Freedom and Democracy	41,088	13.82	6	+1
Frisian National Party	27,288	9.18	4	−1
Party for Freedom	25,116	8.45	4	New
Socialist Party	24,872	8.37	3	−1
Christian Union	18,901	6.36	3	0
GroenLinks	15,556	5.23	2	0
Democrats 66	12,659	4.26	2	+2
Other parties	8,960	3.01	0	–
Total	297,307	100.00	43	–
Valid votes	297,307	99.74		
Invalid/blank votes	773	0.26		
Total votes	298,080	100.00		
Registered voters/turnout	497,367	59.93		
Source: Kiesraad

=== Gelderland ===
Party	Votes	%	Seats	+/–
People's Party for Freedom and Democracy	170,939	19.15	11	+2
Labour Party	148,023	16.58	9	−1
Christian Democratic Appeal	144,467	16.18	9	−6
Party for Freedom	92,563	10.37	6	New
Socialist Party	87,088	9.75	5	−2
Democrats 66	71,951	8.06	4	+3
GroenLinks	55,487	6.21	4	+1
Christian Union	43,436	4.86	3	−1
Reformed Political Party	40,604	4.55	2	−1
50PLUS	17,743	1.99	1	New
Party for the Animals	16,290	1.82	1	0
Other parties	4,262	0.48	0	–
Total	892,853	100.00	55	+2
Valid votes	892,853	99.75		
Invalid/blank votes	2,209	0.25		
Total votes	895,062	100.00		
Registered voters/turnout	1,528,151	58.57		
Source: Kiesraad

=== Groningen ===
Party	Votes	%	Seats	+/–
Labour Party	65,542	24.88	12	0
People's Party for Freedom and Democracy	34,701	13.17	6	+1
Socialist Party	33,812	12.83	6	−1
Christian Democratic Appeal	31,517	11.96	5	−4
Democrats 66	20,515	7.79	3	+2
Party for Freedom	20,373	7.73	3	New
Christian Union	19,999	7.59	3	−1
GroenLinks	19,040	7.23	3	0
Party for the North	8,312	3.15	1	0
Party for the Animals	5,601	2.13	1	0
Other parties	4,056	1.54	0	–
Total	263,468	100.00	43	–
Valid votes	263,468	99.76		
Invalid/blank votes	635	0.24		
Total votes	264,103	100.00		
Registered voters/turnout	453,661	58.22		
Source: Kiesraad

=== Limburg ===
Party	Votes	%	Seats	+/–
Party for Freedom	92,488	20.58	10	New
Christian Democratic Appeal	87,231	19.41	10	−8
People's Party for Freedom and Democracy	71,884	15.99	8	+1
Labour Party	60,685	13.50	6	−2
Socialist Party	53,709	11.95	6	−3
GroenLinks	24,088	5.36	3	+1
Democrats 66	23,487	5.23	2	+1
50PLUS	17,462	3.89	2	New
Other parties	18,431	4.10	0	−2
Total	449,465	100.00	47	–
Valid votes	449,465	99.68		
Invalid/blank votes	1,426	0.32		
Total votes	450,891	100.00		
Registered voters/turnout	872,088	51.70		
Source: Kiesraad

=== North Brabant ===
Party	Votes	%	Seats	+/–
People's Party for Freedom and Democracy	198,870	20.75	12	+1
Christian Democratic Appeal	166,310	17.35	10	−8
Party for Freedom	133,760	13.96	8	New
Socialist Party	132,723	13.85	8	−4
Labour Party	127,958	13.35	7	−1
Democrats 66	76,770	8.01	5	+4
GroenLinks	56,113	5.86	3	+1
50PLUS	31,554	3.29	1	New
Party for the Animals	17,320	1.81	1	0
Other parties	16,963	1.77	0	−2
Total	958,341	100.00	55	–
Valid votes	958,341	99.70		
Invalid/blank votes	2,866	0.30		
Total votes	961,207	100.00		
Registered voters/turnout	1,869,067	51.43		
Source: Kiesraad

=== North Holland ===
Party	Votes	%	Seats	+/–
People's Party for Freedom and Democracy	253,195	22.32	13	0
Labour Party	226,734	19.99	11	0
Party for Freedom	134,275	11.84	6	New
Democrats 66	128,600	11.34	6	+4
Socialist Party	109,027	9.61	5	−4
Christian Democratic Appeal	100,789	8.89	5	−5
GroenLinks	90,793	8.01	5	0
Party for the Animals	28,082	2.48	1	−1
Elderly Party North Holland	21,354	1.88	1	0
50PLUS	19,693	1.74	1	New
Christian Union – Reformed Political Party	19,603	1.73	1	−1
Other parties	2,058	0.18	0	–
Total	1,134,203	100.00	55	–
Valid votes	1,134,203	99.68		
Invalid/blank votes	3,693	0.32		
Total votes	1,137,896	100.00		
Registered voters/turnout	1,987,964	57.24		
Source: Kiesraad

=== Overijssel ===
Party	Votes	%	Seats	+/–
Christian Democratic Appeal	105,157	21.37	11	−6
Labour Party	89,134	18.11	9	0
People's Party for Freedom and Democracy	77,661	15.78	8	+2
Party for Freedom	43,760	8.89	4	New
Socialist Party	42,735	8.68	4	−2
Democrats 66	36,517	7.42	3	+3
Christian Union	35,411	7.20	3	−2
GroenLinks	25,114	5.10	2	0
Reformed Political Party	16,527	3.36	2	0
50PLUS	12,826	2.61	1	New
Other parties	7,301	1.48	0	–
Total	492,143	100.00	47	–
Valid votes	492,143	99.76		
Invalid/blank votes	1,161	0.24		
Total votes	493,304	100.00		
Registered voters/turnout	854,623	57.72		
Source: Kiesraad

=== South Holland ===
Party	Votes	%	Seats	+/–
People's Party for Freedom and Democracy	290,260	20.73	12	0
Labour Party	230,381	16.45	10	0
Party for Freedom	203,143	14.51	8	New
Christian Democratic Appeal	158,901	11.35	6	−7
Socialist Party	131,180	9.37	5	−3
Democrats 66	123,633	8.83	5	+4
GroenLinks	76,483	5.46	3	0
Christian Union	54,866	3.92	2	−2
Reformed Political Party	53,568	3.83	2	0
50PLUS	34,914	2.49	1	New
Party for the Animals	31,910	2.28	1	0
Other parties	10,914	0.78	0	−1
Total	1,400,153	100.00	55	–
Valid votes	1,400,153	99.63		
Invalid/blank votes	5,135	0.37		
Total votes	1,405,288	100.00		
Registered voters/turnout	2,604,363	53.96		
Source: Kiesraad

=== Utrecht ===
Party	Votes	%	Seats	+/–
People's Party for Freedom and Democracy	124,952	22.15	11	+1
Labour Party	82,721	14.66	7	−1
Christian Democratic Appeal	68,017	12.06	6	−4
Democrats 66	60,491	10.72	5	+3
Party for Freedom	59,988	10.63	5	New
GroenLinks	51,721	9.17	4	0
Socialist Party	46,336	8.21	4	−2
Christian Union	26,856	4.76	2	−2
Reformed Political Party	16,871	2.99	1	0
50PLUS	11,562	2.05	1	New
Party for the Animals	11,386	2.02	1	0
Other parties	3,315	0.59	0	−1
Total	564,216	100.00	47	–
Valid votes	564,216	99.71		
Invalid/blank votes	1,636	0.29		
Total votes	565,852	100.00		
Registered voters/turnout	917,232	61.69		
Source: Kiesraad

=== Zeeland ===
Party	Votes	%	Seats	+/–
People's Party for Freedom and Democracy	28,555	16.83	6	+1
Labour Party	26,872	15.84	7	+1
Christian Democratic Appeal	24,105	14.21	6	−4
Party for Freedom	20,018	11.80	5	New
Reformed Political Party	18,828	11.10	4	−1
Socialist Party	14,412	8.49	3	−2
Party for Zeeland	9,456	5.57	2	0
Christian Union	7,965	4.69	2	−1
Democrats 66	6,967	4.11	2	+2
GroenLinks	6,095	3.59	1	−1
Other parties	6,401	3.77	0	–
Total	169,674	100.00	38	–
Valid votes	169,674	99.80		
Invalid/blank votes	343	0.20		
Total votes	170,017	100.00		
Registered voters/turnout	288,911	58.85		
Source: Kiesraad

== Island council elections ==
Political party	2007	2011	change
Bonaire island council
Union Patriotiko Boneriano (UPB)	5	4	-1
Partido Demokrátiko Boneriano (PDB)	4	3	-1
Partido Pro Hustisia & Union (PHU)	-	1	+1
Movementu Boneiru Liber (MBL)	-	1	+1
total	9	9	
turnout	83%	75%	
Saba island council
Windward Islands People's Movement (WIPM)	4	4	-
Saba Labour Party (SLP)	1	1	-
total	5	5	
turnout		88%	
Sint Eustatius island council
Democratische Partij (DP)	4	2	-2
Progressive Labour Party (PLP)	1	1	-
United People’s Coalition (UPC)	-	1	+1
St. Eustatius Empowerment Party (STEP)	-	1	+1
total	5	5	
turnout		68%	
