= The Estates =

Assemblies of representatives of feudal society

The Estates, also known as the States (French: États, German: Landstände, Dutch: Staten, Hungarian: Rendek), was the assembly of the representatives of the estates of the realm, the divisions of society in feudal times, called together for purposes of deliberation, legislation or taxation. A meeting of the estates that covered an entire kingdom was called an estates general.

The General Court of the Principality of Catalonia

== Overview ==
The first estate was the clergy, the second the nobility and the third the commoners, although actual membership in the third estate varied from country to country. Bourgeoisie, peasants and people with no estate from birth were separated in Sweden and Finland as late as 1905.

Representation through estates was the norm in Europe until the advent of popular representation beginning with the French Revolution. The Estates General of France were convoked only twice between 1614 and 1789, both times during the Fronde (1648–53), and in neither case did they actually meet. At the final meeting of the Estates in 1789, they voted to join in a single National Assembly, generally seen as marking the start of the French Revolution. Estates continued to meet in Navarre until 1828, in Hungary until 1848, in Sweden until 1866, and in the Duchy of Mecklenburg until 1918.

In some countries, the parliament kept the same name when its feudal organization was replaced with a more modern kind of representation, like census or universal suffrage. In Sweden, the Riksdag of the Estates was replaced with the Riksdag in 1866.

== List of estates ==
Modus sedendi of the inaugural session of the General Court of the Crown of Aragon of 1383-1384, opened in Montsó and prorogued to Tamarit de Llitera and Fraga

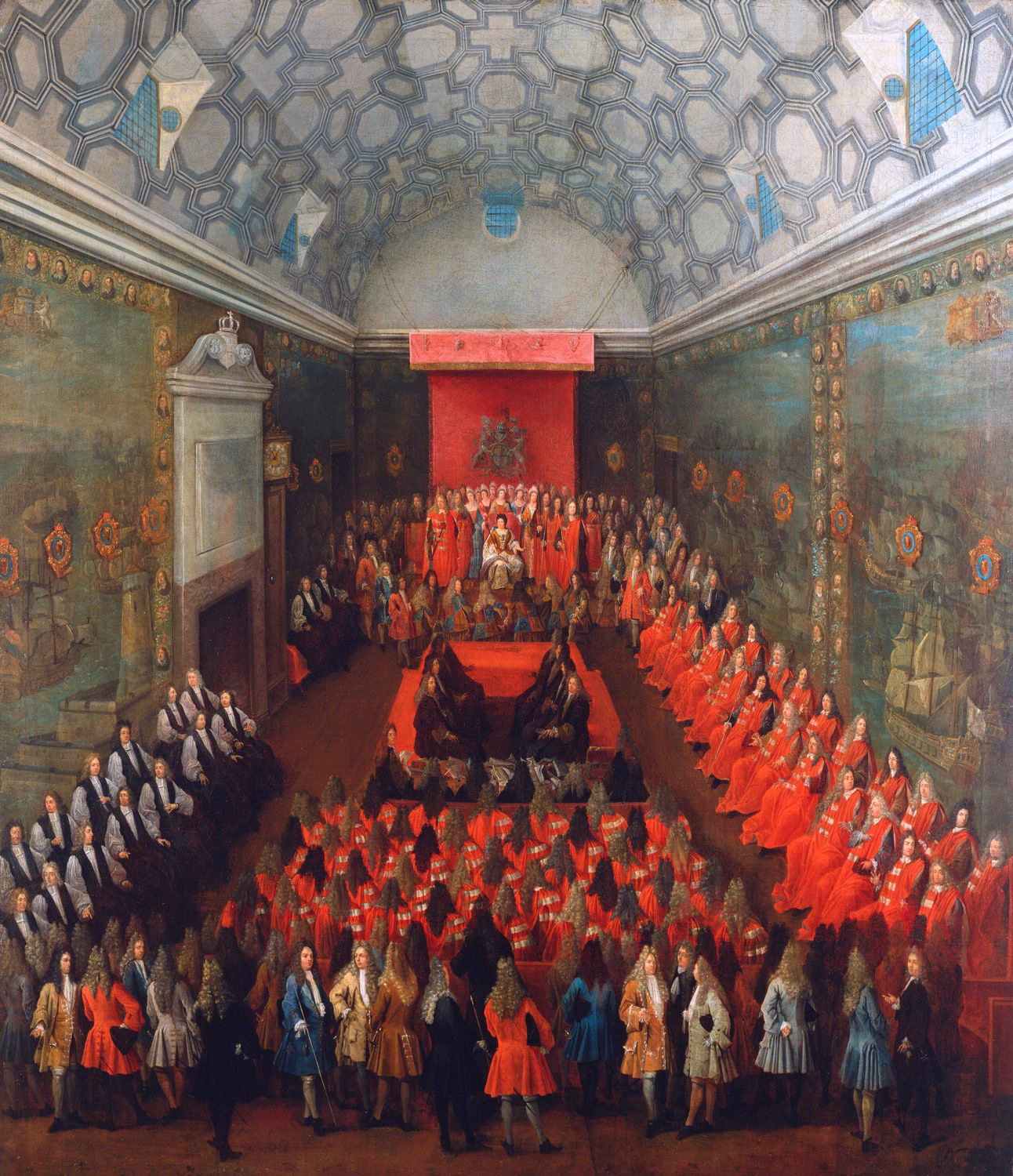
Queen Anne opening the Parliament of the Great Britain

- Convention of the Estates of Scotland
  - Parliament of Scotland, a meeting of the three estates of the realm
  - Convention of Estates (1689)
- Council of States (Switzerland)
  - Landsgemeinde
- Estates of the Netherlands Antilles
  - Estates of Aruba
  - Estates of Curaçao
  - Estates of Sint Maarten
- Estates General (France)
- States Provincial (France)
  - Estates of Béarn
  - Estates of Brittany
  - Estates of Burgundy
  - Estates of Languedoc
  - Estates of Navarre
- Parlement (France)
  - Parlement of Paris
  - Parlement of Toulouse
  - Parlement of Rouen (Normandy)
  - Parlement of Aix-en-Provence
  - Parlement of Rennes (Brittany)
  - Parlement of Pau
  - Parlement of Besancon
- Cortes (Spain and Portugal)
  - Cortes of Castilla
  - Cortes of Leon
  - Cortes of Aragon
  - General Court of Catalonia
  - Valencianes Courts
  - Cortes of Navarra
  - Portuguese Cortes
- Junta (governing body)
- Cabildo (Oversea Spanish domains)
- Imperial Diet (Holy Roman Empire)
  - Diet (assembly)
- Landstände, the territorial estates within the Holy Roman Empire
  - Estates of Württemberg
  - Prussian estates
- Riksdag of the Estates, the former diet of Sweden
- Thing (Scandinavian assembly)
- Diet of Finland
- Stamenti, the former parliament of Sardinia
- Bohemian Estates
- States of Alderney
- States of Guernsey
  - States of Election
- States of Jersey
- States General of the Batavian Republic
- States General of the Netherlands
- States Provincial (Netherlands)
  - States of Brabant
  - States of Drenthe
  - States of Flanders
  - States of Flevoland
  - States of Friesland
  - States of Gelderland
  - States of Groningen
  - States of Holland and West Friesland
  - States of Limburg
  - States of North Brabant
  - States of North Holland
  - States of Overijssel
  - States of South Holland
  - States of Utrecht
  - States of Zeeland
- Zemsky Sobor (Russia)
- Veche (Medieval Rus)
  - Novgorod veche
- Cossack Rada
  - Sich Rada
  - Black Council
- Diet of Hungary
  - Transylvanian Diet
  - Sabor (Croatia)
- Bohemian Diet
- Sejm of the Polish–Lithuanian Commonwealth
  - Sejm of the Kingdom of Poland
  - Seimas of the Grand Duchy of Lithuania
  - Sejmik
  - Latvian Saeima

== Meeting places ==
Some places were the Estates met were known as House of Estates or Hall of Estates, or similar designations:

- Finland: House of the Estates, built in the late 19th century in Helsinki for the Diet.
- France:
  - Dijon: salle des États in the Palace of the Dukes of Burgundy, meeting place of the Estates of Burgundy.
  - Paris:
    - 1859–1870: salle des États built as part of the New Louvre in the new pavillon Denon, used for the speech from the throne before a joint meeting of the legislative houses (although they were not called Estates); later substantially transformed and today the exhibition place of the Mona Lisa.
    - 1860s: new salle des États built for the same purpose in the new pavillon des États (or pavillon des Sessions), never completed nor used, presently the Gallery of the Five Continents.
  - Versailles: temporary salle des États built in 1789 for the Estates General of 1789 in the warehouse of the Royal Opera at the hôtel des Menus-Plaisirs near the Palace of Versailles.
- Germany: a number of Ständehaus (sing.), house of territorial estates (Landstände):
  - Dresden: Sächsisches Ständehaus, built in the 1900s for the Saxon Landtag, although no longer called Landstände at the time.
