= Liane den Haan =

Dutch politician and nonprofit director

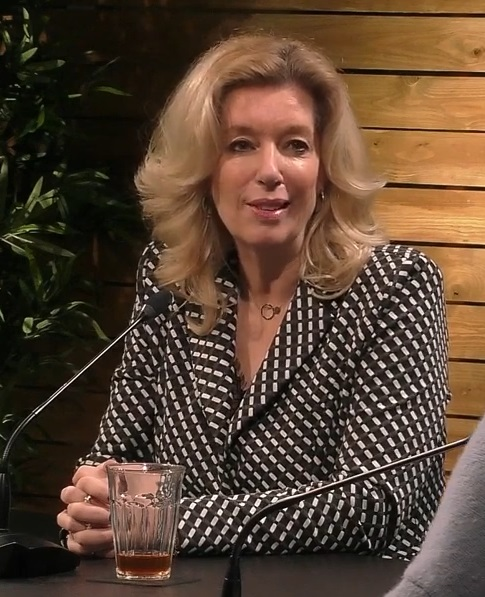

Member of the House of Representatives
- In office 31 March 2021 – 5 December 2023

Member of the Woerden municipal council
- In office 16 March 2006 – 10 March 2010

Personal details
- Born: Natalia Liane den Haan; 24 August 1967 (age 59) Woerden, Netherlands
- Party: GOUD Netherlands (since 2022)
- Other political affiliations: Democrats 66 (until 2007); Labour Party/Progressief Woerden; 50PLUS (2020–2021)
- Children: 3
- Education: The Hague University of Applied Sciences

Natalia Liane den Haan (born 24 August 1967) is a Dutch politician and former nonprofit director, who was a member of the House of Representatives from 2021 to 2023.

She was the managing director of LGBT rights organization COC Nederland from 2001 to 2004 and subsequently filled that same position at senior advocacy group ANBO. Den Haan left the latter organization after she had been chosen in October 2020 to lead the pensioners' party 50PLUS in the 2021 general election. She succeeded Henk Krol and was elected to the House of Representatives. Following an internal conflict within 50PLUS, she left the party in May 2021 while keeping her seat. Den Haan founded her own party, GOUD Netherlands, the following year.

Den Haan has also held a seat in the Social and Economic Council (SER) and in the Woerden municipal council for four years as a member of Democrats 66 and the Labour Party.

== Early life and career ==
Den Haan was born on 24 August 1967 in Woerden in the province Utrecht. Her father worked as manager of a mortar factory, while her mother was a hairdresser. Den Haan attended the secondary schools Kalsbeek College and Minkema College, located in the same town, at mavo and havo level. She subsequently studied nursery at a university of applied sciences and worked as a hospital nurse. Den Haan's father died when she was 18 years old.

At the start of the 1990s, after having studied business administration at The Hague University of Applied Sciences for four years, she took a job as operations coordinator at a catering and party service company. Den Haan left that company in 1993 and thereafter worked in recruitment and organization consultancy. She was an operations coordinator and later operations and product group manager at Van der Kruijs RPD Groep until 1998. She then worked for two years as a senior consultant at Verstrate Business Development Support before becoming CEO of The Office Managers in 2000.

=== COC Nederland (2001–2004) ===
Den Haan became the managing director of COC Nederland, an LGBT rights organization, in 2001. In an interview, she told that she had chosen for the federation because she wanted to work at a more idealistic place.

Den Haan managed to put the COC's finances and membership records in order, but the organization's problems returned while she was on maternity leave. Because of this, she advocated management reforms. Subsequently, the board of directors suspended her in spring 2004 and started a dismissal procedure, arguing that her leadership had resulted in a budget deficit and that she had pitted employees of COC against the board. A local judge determined that the suspension was unjust, as no proof was found to support the accusations. During an emergency general meeting in July, Den Haan was voted out by the COC's members, while the board resigned. She left her post on 1 November. The internal quarrel was one of the reasons for the establishment of the competing organization Homo LesBische Federatie Nederland.

=== ANBO (2005–2020) ===
In May 2005, Den Haan started working as managing director of ANBO, an organization with over 150,000 members advocating for the interests of the elderly. She managed to improve the financial situation of the association, which was €3 million in debt and was close to bankruptcy. ANBO became an affiliate of the trade union federation FNV in 2009 after the organizations had cooperated on multiple issues. The move was supported by Den Haan, who argued that it would give ANBO more tools to serve the interests of the elderly. It also resulted in Den Haan receiving a seat in the Social and Economic Council (SER).

Under her leadership, ANBO moved powers from its chapters to its headquarters: its board was dissolved and Den Haan was given a new title (directeur-bestuurder) in July 2013. Simultaneously, a supervisory board and a members council, whose chair was chosen by Den Haan, were formed. Members of the management of the Overijssel division who had criticized those reforms were expelled. According to Den Haan, the reason was that they were unable to explain the division's finances, but a judge determined three removals were unjust. When the organizational structure of the FNV was reformed in 2013 after internal struggles, ANBO ended its membership. Den Haan stated that the largest subsidiaries would keep their disproportional influence and that she wanted subsidiaries to have more say in issues in their respective areas of specialty.

In September 2015, ANBO's management blocked access to the bank accounts and member registries of its nearly 400 chapters after it said that at least €200,000 had been embezzled and that a letter had been sent calling to embezzle more. Volunteers were only able to use money with the approval of ANBO's headquarters. That led to the departure and expulsion of many volunteers in chapter managements, to the establishment of local alternative organizations, and to calls for Den Haan's resignation. Volunteers said their integrity had been publicly put into doubt and called it part of an effort to diminish the power of the chapters. The number of ANBO members decreased from 180,000 to 125,000 in the following months, causing the organization to lose its position as the largest Dutch interest group for seniors to the Catholic Unie KBO. In July 2016, ANBO's management disbanded all its chapters.

The advocacy group joined the Trade Union Federation for Professionals (VCP) in 2017. Den Haan again became a member of the SER when the VCP received a second seat the following year, but left the advisory body in the first half of 2019. Den Haan quit as ANBO director at the end of December 2020 because of her position at 50PLUS.

During her time at ANBO, she had also been active at Roze 50+ (Pink 50+), a cooperation between ANBO and COC Nederland supporting elderly LGBT people; Fundis, a network of health care providers; and Summa College, an Eindhoven mbo school with multiple locations. Den Haan joined the supervisory board of Fundis (then called Vierstroom) in December 2010 and became the board's chair in September 2011. She left Fundis at the end of November 2018. At Summa College, Den Haan chaired the supervisory board from 2018 until April 2021, and has been a regular member since.

== Politics ==
=== Woerden municipal council ===
Den Haan first appeared on the ballot during the March 2006 municipal election in the town Woerden. She was placed second on the party list of Democrats 66 (D66) and was elected to the municipal council. The following year, she switched to the Labour Party (PvdA), which cooperates in the Woerden municipal council with GroenLinks under the name Progressief Woerden. Den Haan was not re-elected in the 2010 elections, being placed seventh on the party list, but she remained a staffer assisting the group. She was on Progressief Woerden's party list once more in 2014, being their sixteenth candidate.

=== 50PLUS leader and election campaign ===
In July 2020, Den Haan was asked by 50PLUS chair Jan Nagel to apply for the position of lijsttrekker in the 2021 general election. She was not a member of the party. 50PLUS had been without a leader since Henk Krol had left the party in May to establish the Party for the Future. The party's leadership put Den Haan forward as their preferred lijsttrekker during a press conference in August after fourteen candidates had applied. During an online convention on 3 October, she won the member election with 52% of the 362 votes and thus officially became the party's lijsttrekker. Five other people ran for the position including members of parliament Corrie van Brenk, who received 42% of the vote, and Léonie Sazias. However, the latter dropped out and endorsed Den Haan to prevent Van Brenk from winning.

Before her election, 50PLUS had opposed reforms of the pension system proposed by the cabinet, unions, and employers' associations, but Den Haan had supported them while she was ANBO director. After the election program was released, Den Haan called it a done deal and said that she wanted the party to be involved in working out the details of the reforms. Den Haan also wanted to widen the party's reach by taking care of future elderly people instead of solely defending the interests of the current elderly generation. The only incumbent on 50PLUS's party list for the 2021 general election was its lijstduwer. During the campaign, Den Haan explained that her party had abandoned its position that the retirement age should unconditionally return to 65 in order to finance an increase in the state pension. She said that, under her plan, people who want to retire at 65 as opposed to 67 should make an additional contribution to their state pension. After the party's third candidate, Ellen Verkoelen, had criticized those comments, Den Haan to no effect called on her to withdraw her candidacy if she disagreed.

=== House term ===
Logo of Den Haan's independent parliamentary group

50PLUS lost two of its three seats in the 2021 general election, causing Den Haan to become the only member of her party to have a seat in the new House. She was sworn in on 31 March and was on every standing committee including as vice chair of the Committee for Education, Culture and Science. Den Haan announced on 6 May that she had decided to leave 50PLUS due to a falling-out with the party leadership and that she would continue as an independent politician. The conflict had started during the campaign, and the board had written a letter with numerous complaints about Den Haan's leadership to all 50PLUS members in late April. They accused her of not cooperating with the leadership and of following a progressive course without consultation. Den Haan had in turn reacted in an internal memo that she had been sabotaged, teased, and intimidated. Even though Den Haan left her party, she remained a parliamentary group as opposed to an independent House member and kept the same funding and speaking time during debates. This was because the speaker argued that it was impossible for someone to split off from a one-person group. To decrease her workload as an independent politician, Den Haan started cooperating with Sylvana Simons (BIJ1) and Caroline van der Plas (BBB), who also have a one-person group, while she mostly focussed on elderly policy and income development. However, she told that her idea to pool policy advisors was rejected.

In August 2021, she met with the Minister of Tourism and Environment of the unrecognized state of Northern Cyprus while on holiday. This led to criticism from the Cypriot Minister of Finance. Den Haan defended herself, saying that she was visiting him informally in her capacity as a private citizen. Later that year, she offered her help to elderly care facilities following personnel shortages due to the COVID-19 pandemic. After she had received several reactions, Den Haan began volunteering on weekends. She was a member of a committee tasked with the preparation of a parliamentary inquiry into the government's COVID-19 response and made herself available to participate in the inquiry. When it was indefinitely postponed in June 2022 as only four parties had nominated an MP to take part, Den Haan co-wrote an opinion piece in which she called it an unwise decision given that the pandemic had impacted all facets of society.

She launched her own pensioners' party called GOUD Netherlands (GOLD, a contraction of 'good old') in September 2022. Den Haan said the party's positions would not deviate much from those of 50PLUS. However, she described GOUD as having a less populist style and being more leftist on issues such as climate and migration. The parliamentary group of 50PLUS in the Provincial Council of South Holland switched to the new party shortly after. When the fourth Rutte cabinet collapsed in July 2023 – triggering a snap election in November – Den Haan announced she would not seek a second term. She called the state of politics ugly, saying populism and opportunism were rampant and that she was suffering from misogyny.

Den Haan joined the board of directors of Zonnehuisgroep Vlaardingen, a local long-term healthcare provider, in November 2023, where she serves alongside Arjan in 't Veld.

== Personal life ==
Den Haan lives in Woerden. She is divorced and has two daughters and one son. During her marriage, she bore the last name Wubbels.
