= Henk Krol =

Dutch politician

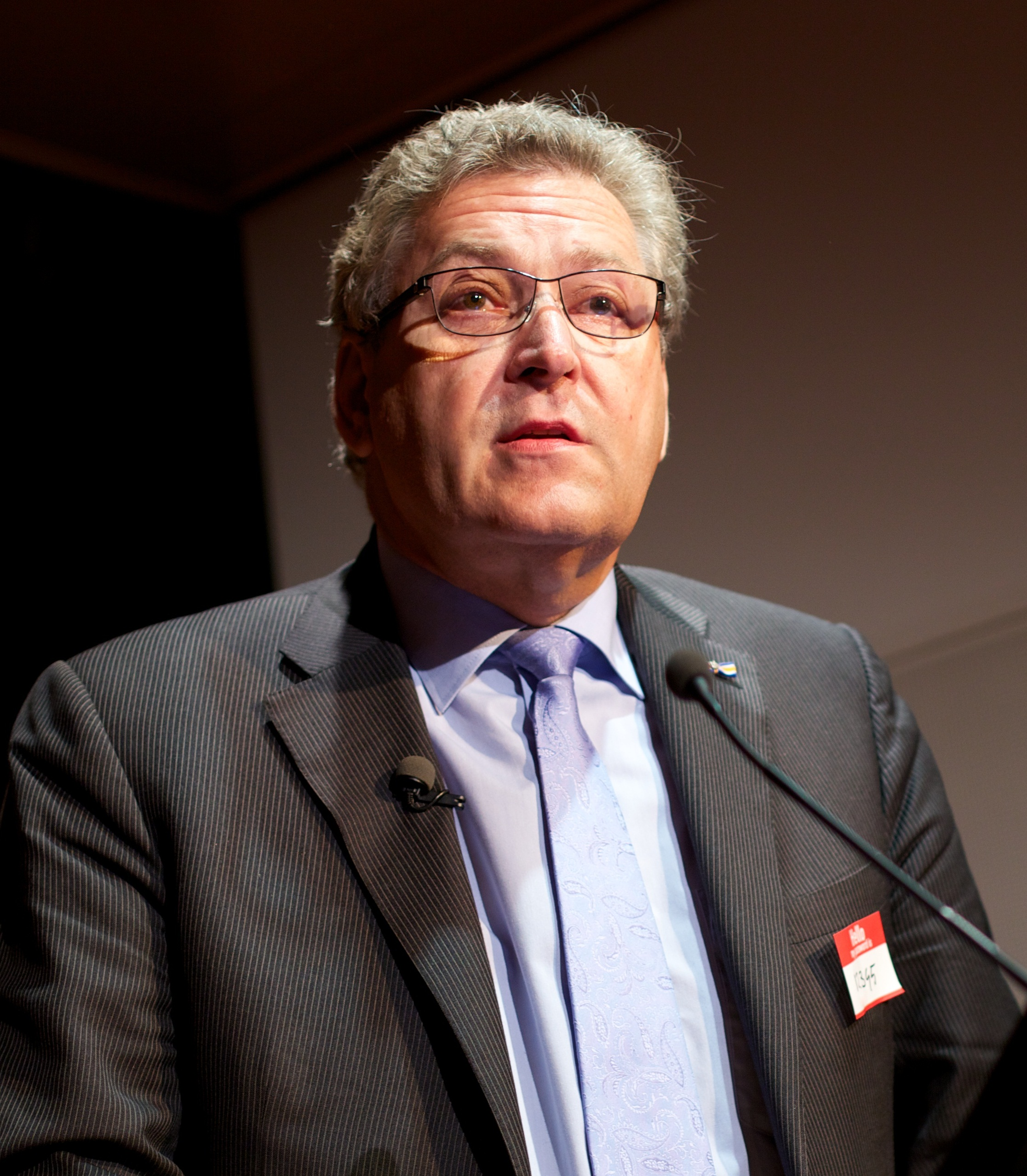
- Krol in 2013

Member of the House of Representatives
- In office 10 September 2014 – 30 March 2021
- In office 20 September 2012 – 4 October 2013

Parliamentary leader in the House of Representatives
- In office 6 May 2020 – 8 August 2020
- Parliamentary group: Krol/Van Kooten-Arissen Group
- In office 10 September 2014 – 3 May 2020
- Preceded by: Martine Baay-Timmerman
- Succeeded by: Corrie van Brenk
- Parliamentary group: 50PLUS
- In office 20 September 2012 – 4 October 2013
- Succeeded by: Norbert Klein
- Parliamentary group: 50PLUS

Leader of 50PLUS
- In office 8 October 2016 – 3 May 2020
- Preceded by: Jan Nagel
- Succeeded by: Liane den Haan
- In office 12 January 2012 – 4 October 2013
- Preceded by: Jan Nagel
- Succeeded by: Jan Nagel

Personal details
- Born: Henricus Cornelis Maria Krol; 1 April 1950 (age 76) Tilburg, Netherlands
- Party: Belang van Nederland (since 2023)
- Other political affiliations: VVD (1977–2011); 50PLUS (2011–2020); Party for the Future (2020); Henk Krol List (2020–2022)
- Education: Free University Amsterdam (Bachelor of Philosophy)
- Occupation: Politician; journalist; businessman; activist

Henricus Cornelis Maria "Henk" Krol (Dutch pronunciation: [ɦɛnˈrikʏs kɔrˈneːlɪs maːˈrijaː ɦɛŋ ˈkrɔl]; born 1 April 1950) is a Dutch journalist, publisher, entrepreneur, activist and politician. He was a member of the House of Representatives from 2012 to 2013, and again from 2014 to 2021. Having served as the leader of 50PLUS, he left the party in 2020, due to disagreements with the rest of the party's leadership. Since 2023, Krol has been a member of Belang van Nederland (BVNL).

== Career ==
Krol served as the main spokesman for the People's Party for Freedom and Democracy (VVD) in the House of Representatives from 1978 until 1985. He was editor-in-chief of the magazine Gay Krant, which he founded in 1980. Between March 2011 and September 2012, he was a member of the Provincial Council of North Brabant.

For the 2012 general election Krol was the lead candidate for the pensioners' party 50PLUS. Krol was the parliamentary leader of 50PLUS in the House of Representatives from 13 September 2012 until 4 October 2013 and a Member of the House of Representatives from 20 September 2012 until 4 October 2013.

On 4 October 2013, de Volkskrant published an article alleging that Krol withheld pension money from his employees from 2004 until 2007, and then again in 2009, while working for the Gay Krant. De Volkskrant said that the tip-off leading to the article had come via Publeaks NL, a new Dutch anonymous whistleblowing initiative. The same day, Krol announced his resignation from the House of Representatives in a letter, admitting that he made 'many mistakes'. Although he did not address the allegations directly, he concluded that "it is impossible for me to continue in my function as representative". He was replaced in the House of Representatives by Martine Baay-Timmerman on 29 October 2013.

He was elected with preferential votes for the Ouderen Appèl party to the municipal council of Eindhoven in March 2014. Krol returned to the House of Representatives on 10 September 2014, when Martine Baay-Timmerman went on sick leave.

Logo of the Henk Krol List (2020–2022)

After disagreements with the party board of 50PLUS, Krol resigned from his leadership position and exited the party. He founded the Party for the Future together with fellow independent member of the House of Representatives Femke Merel van Kooten, but left the party a few months later. He unsuccessfully participated in the 2021 general election with the progressive conservative party Henk Krol List (Dutch: Lijst Henk Krol), which he had established on 18 October 2020. In the 2023 general election, Krol was the second candidate of the right-wing to far-right party Belang van Nederland, but did not win a seat.

== Electoral history ==
Electoral history of Henk Krol
Year	Body	Party	Pos.	Votes	Result		Ref.
Year	Body	Party	Pos.	Votes	Party seats	Individual	Ref.
2012	House of Representatives	50PLUS	1	148,273	2	Won	
2017	House of Representatives	50PLUS	1	233,179	4	Won	
2021	House of Representatives	Henk Krol List	1	8,043	0	Lost	
2023	House of Representatives	Belang van Nederland	2	1,472	0	Lost	

== Decorations ==
- Knight of the Order of Orange-Nassau (Netherlands, 1999)

Party political offices
Preceded by Office established	Lijsttrekker of 50PLUS; 2012 · 2017	Succeeded by Liane den Haan
Preceded by Jan Nagel	Leader of 50PLUS; 2012–2013; 2014–2020	Succeeded by Jan Nagel
Preceded by Jan Nagel	Leader of 50PLUS; 2012–2013; 2014–2020	Succeeded by Liane den Haan
Preceded by Office established	Parliamentary leader of 50PLUS in the House of Representatives; 2012–2013; 2014–2020	Succeeded by Norbert Klein
Preceded by Martine Baay-Timmerman	Parliamentary leader of 50PLUS in the House of Representatives; 2012–2013; 2014–2020	Succeeded by Corrie van Brenk
