= Jan Nagel =

Dutch politician

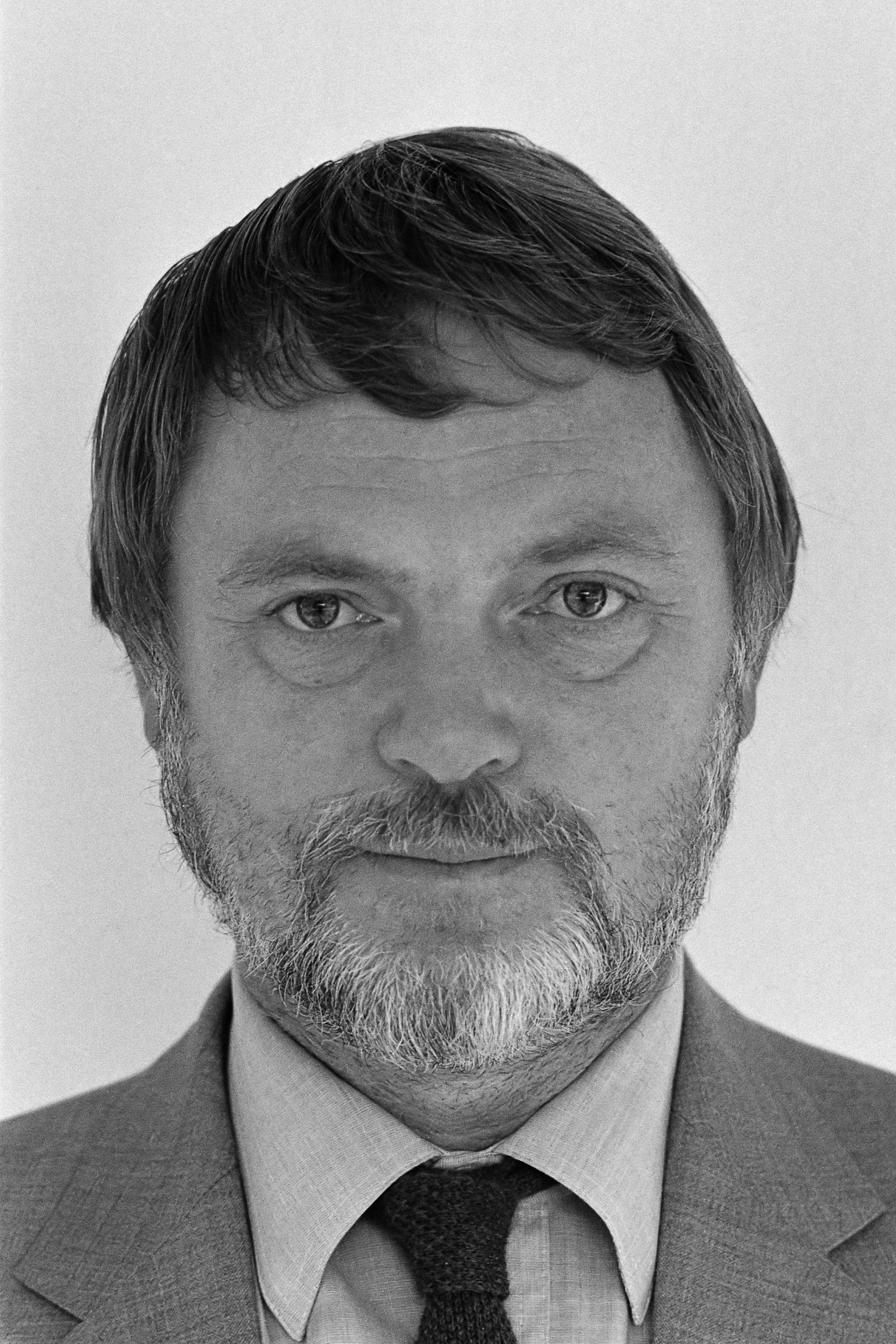
- Jan Nagel in 1983

Parliamentary leader in the Senate
- In office 7 June 2011 – 11 June 2019
- Preceded by: Office established
- Succeeded by: Martin van Rooijen
- Parliamentary group: 50PLUS

Member of the Senate
- In office 7 June 2011 – 11 June 2019
- In office 20 September 1977 – 13 September 1983

Chairman of 50PLUS
- In office 4 June 2016 – 26 May 2018
- Preceded by: John Struijlaard
- Succeeded by: Geert Dales
- In office 2 November 2013 – 29 March 2014
- Preceded by: Willem Holthuizen
- Succeeded by: John Struijlaard
- In office 10 January 2009 – 10 November 2012
- Preceded by: Office established
- Succeeded by: Willem Holthuizen

Leader of 50PLUS
- In office 4 October 2013 – 8 October 2016
- Preceded by: Henk Krol
- Succeeded by: Henk Krol
- In office 10 January 2009 – 12 January 2012
- Preceded by: Office established
- Succeeded by: Henk Krol

Chairman of Livable Netherlands
- In office 20 April 1999 – 25 May 2002
- Preceded by: Office established
- Succeeded by: Fons Zinken

Personal details
- Born: Johan Georg Nagel; 20 June 1939 (age 87) Amsterdam, Netherlands
- Party: 50PLUS (from 2009)
- Other political affiliations: Party for Justice, Action and Progress (2005–2009); Livable Netherlands (1999–2004); Livable Hilversum (from 1993); Labour Party (1960–1993)
- Occupation: Politician · Journalist · Editor · Author · Columnist · Television producer · Radio producer · Political pundit · Activist

Johan Georg "Jan" Nagel (born 20 June 1939) is a Dutch politician who was a member of the Labour Party, and later formed his own parties. He is currently in the Pensioners' Party 50PLUS.

Nagel started his career in his twenties on VARA-Radio where he worked as a producer. At the same time he served as a member of the executive committee of the Labour Party (PvdA). Nagel was one of the creators of the radio programme In de Rooie Haan. He also wrote his Tien over Rood which served as a political manifesto of the Nieuw Links within the Labour Party. From 1977 to 1983 Nagel was a PvdA deputy in the House of Representatives. At VARA-Radio he eventually became the editor-in-chief of the Achter het Nieuws.

Preoccupied with the problem of the widening gap between politics and people, he founded a local party called Livable Hilversum in 1993. In 2001 he established Livable Netherlands where he worked with Henk Westbroek, Willem van Kooten, Ton Luiting, Broos Schnetz and Pim Fortuyn. He has also been the party chairman of Livable Netherlands. In 2005 there followed the Party for Justice, Action and Progress, which he founded together with the former police spokesman Klaas Wilting, entrepreneur Peter Schouten and the party's first lead candidate reporter Peter R. de Vries. His autobiography Boven het maaiveld was published in 2001. Nagel participated in the provincial elections of 2 March 2011 as a founding member of 50PLUS. His son in law is chess grandmaster Yasser Seirawan.

Party political offices
New political party	Chairman of Livable Netherlands; 1999–2002	Succeeded by Fons Zinken
New political party	Chairman of 50PLUS; 2011–2012	Succeeded by Willem Holthuizen
New political party	Leader of 50PLUS; 2011–2012	Succeeded by Henk Krol
New political party	Parliamentary leader of 50PLUS in the Senate of the Netherlands; 2011–2019	Succeeded by Martin van Rooijen
Preceded by Henk Krol	Leader of 50PLUS; 2013–2016	Succeeded by Henk Krol
Preceded by Willem Holthuizen	Chairman of 50PLUS; 2013–2014	Succeeded by John Struijlaard
Preceded by John Struijlaard	Chairman of 50PLUS; 2016–present	Incumbent
