= Estate =

Estate or The Estate may refer to:

== Law ==
- Estate (law), a term in common law for a person's property, entitlements and obligations
- Estates of the realm, a broad social category in the histories of certain countries
  - The Estates, representative bodies of the estates of the realm
    - Estates General, a supra-regional gathering of representatives of the estates of the realm
- Real property or real estate
  - Estate in land, concept in English and Welsh property law
  - Real estate, property consisting of land and the buildings on it
    - Estate agent or real estate agent
    - Estate (land), the grounds and tenancies (such as farms, housing, woodland, parkland) associated with a very large property
      - Fortified estate, a housing estate surrounded by a wall with gate entrance/checkpoint
      - Housing estate, a group of houses built as a single development
      - Industrial estate (office park) and trading estate, property planned and sub-let for industrial and commercial use
      - Landed estate, income-generating land owned by gentry
- Literary estate, the intellectual property of a deceased author, or the executor thereof

== Automobiles and technology ==
- Estate car (station wagon), a passenger car with a full-size interior cargo compartment
- Buick Estate, a luxury station wagon offered by General Motors from 1940 until 1990
- Estate, a brand of major appliances, first from RCA Corporation, afterwards from Whirlpool Corporation
- Chevrolet Estate, a station wagon sold in Indonesia

== Books ==
- The Estate (novel), a 1969 novel by Isaac Bashevis Singer
- The Estate play by Oladipo Agboluaje

== Film and TV ==
- Estate (2020 film), a short film
- Estate (2022 film), an Indian Tamil-language horror drama film
- The Estate (2020 film), film with Eric Roberts, directed by James Kapner
- The Estate (2022 film), a dark comedy film
- The Estate (2012 TV series), BBC documentary
- The Estate, 2011 film with Brian Murphy
- The Estate (South African TV series), a South African telenovela

== Music ==
- Estate (album), a jazz piano album by Michel Petrucciani
- "Estate" (song), a 1960 Italian song and jazz standard, sung by Milva, written by Brighetti, Bruno Martino

== Other ==
- Estate Khmaladze (born 1944), Georgian statistician
- A brand name of Estradiol valerate
