= Zannier =

Zannier is a surname, most prevalent in Italy and France.

Notable people with this surname include:

- Eduardo Franco Zannier (1945–1989), Uruguayan musician
- Hélène Zannier (born 1972), French politician
- Italo Zannier (born 1932), Italian historian (it)
- Lamberto Zannier (born 1954), Italian diplomat
- Umberto Zannier (born 1957), Italian mathematician

== See also ==
- Groupe Zannier, French company
