= Groupe Zannier =

French company

Zannier
- Industry: Fashion, Estate, Hotels
- Founded: 1962
- Founders: Roger Zannier, Fashion; Arnaud Zannier, Estate
- Headquarters: Saint Chamond, France
- Number of locations: 6 hotels (2026)
- Area served: Worldwide
- Website: zannier.com

Zannier is a French company, led by Arnaud Zannier, the son of renowned Italian Stone Mason Roger Zannier, Roger an Artisan focused on fashion, Arnaud started his career as an executive in fashion and transitioned to Wood-Themed Luxury Hotels.

== Zannier Hotels ==
- Le Chalet Zannier, Megeve, the first Zannier Hotel, featured by Conde Nast on the Coolest places to stay.
- Zannier Phum Baitang, Siem Reap, awarded 4 stars by Forbes Travel Guide.
- Zannier Sonop, Namib Desert, Rated 1st in Namibia by Hotels Digest, Holds 3 Michelin keys.
- Zannier Bai Sang Ho, Dak Lak, Rated 44th in the world in Telegraph 2024 Hotel awards
- Zannier Ile de Bendor, Bandol, a Mediterranean island resort
- Zannier Omaanda, Windhoek East
