= Gerrit Jan van Otterloo =

Dutch politician

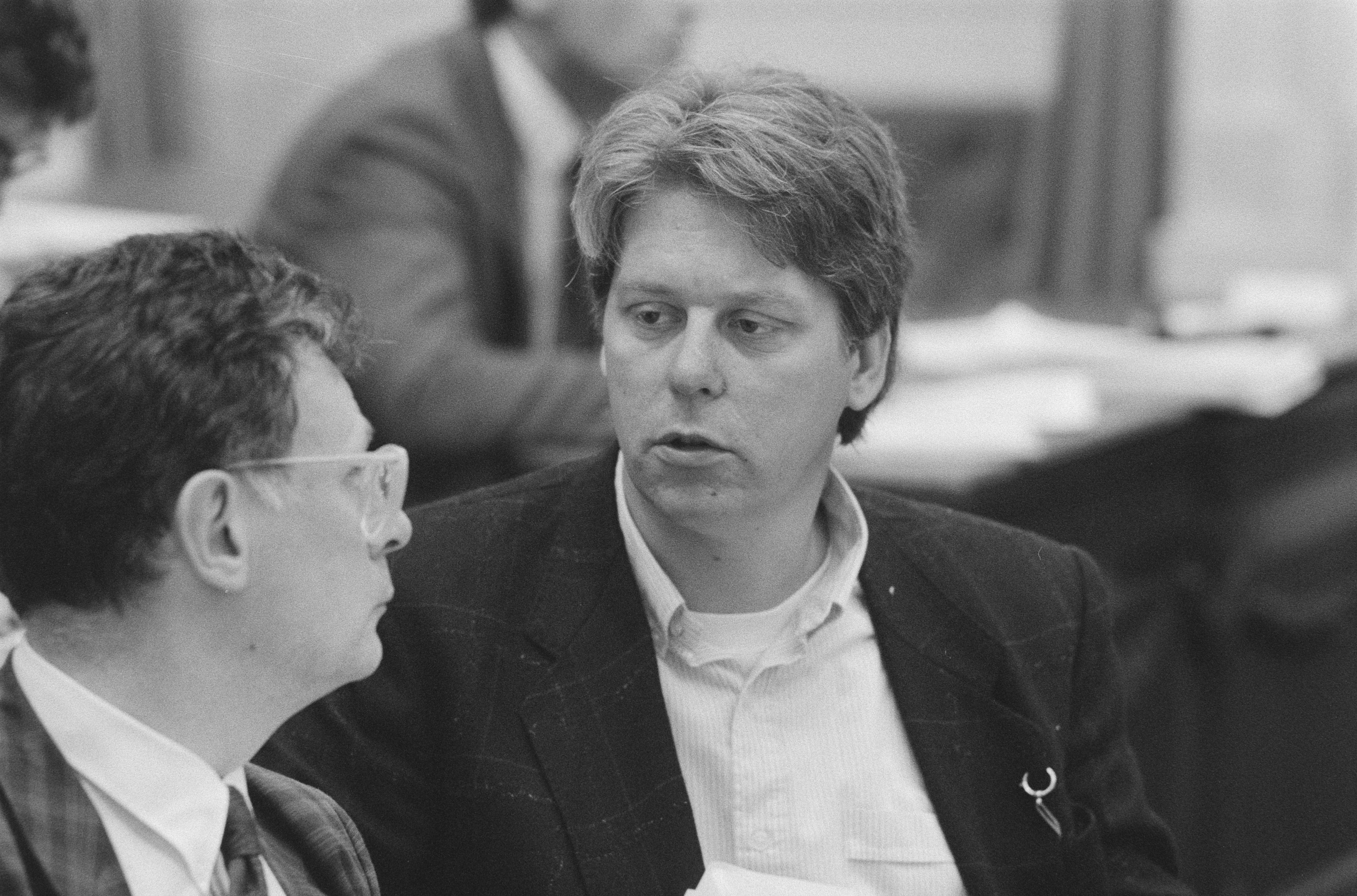
G. J. Van Otterloo

Gerrit Jan van Otterloo (born 4 May 1949) is a Dutch politician. He served as Member of Parliament for the Labour Party between 1986 and 1994 and for 50PLUS between 2019 and 2021.

== Electoral history ==
Electoral history of Gerrit Jan van Otterloo
Year	Body	Party	Pos.	Votes	Result		Ref.
Year	Body	Party	Pos.	Votes	Party seats	Individual	Ref.
2024	European Parliament	50PLUS	2	3,779	0	Lost	
2025	House of Representatives	50PLUS	48	106	2	Lost	
2026	The Hague Municipal Council	50PLUS	9 (Note: Van Otterloo participated as lijstduwer.)	24	0	Lost	
