= Aar de Goede =

Dutch politician (1928–2016)

His Excellency Aar de Goede
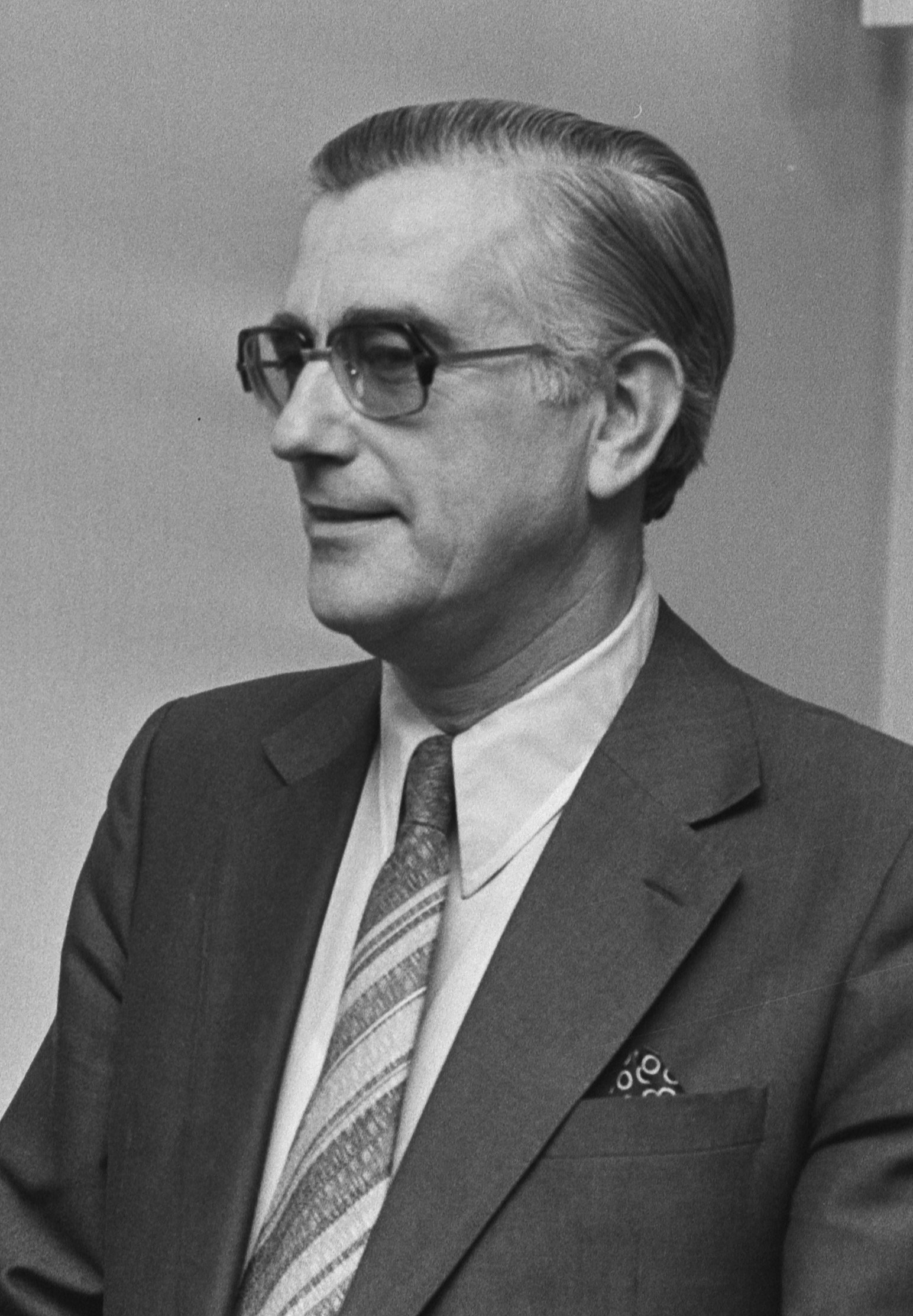
- Aar de Goede in 1979

Member of the Senate
- In office 3 June 1986 – 23 June 1987
- Parliamentary group: Democrats 66

Member of the European Parliament
- In office 17 July 1979 – 24 July 1984
- Parliamentary group: Non-Inscrits
- Constituency: Netherlands

State Secretary for Finance
- In office 11 May 1973 – 19 December 1977 Serving with Fons van der Stee (1973); Martin van Rooijen (1973–1977)
- Prime Minister: Joop den Uyl
- Preceded by: Willem Scholten; Fons van der Stee
- Succeeded by: Ad Nooteboom

Member of the House of Representatives
- In office 23 February 1967 – 11 May 1973
- Parliamentary group: Democrats 66

Personal details
- Born: Arie Goede; 21 May 1928 Vlaardingen, Netherlands
- Died: 16 May 2016 (aged 87) Zoeterwoude, Netherlands
- Party: Democrats 66 (from 1966)
- Occupation: Politician · Civil servant · Researcher

Arie "Aar" de Goede (21 May 1928 – 16 May 2016) was a Dutch politician of the Democrats 66 (D66) party. He served in the House of Representatives (1967–1973), European Parliament (1979–1984) and Senate (1986–1987). As part of the executive he was State Secretary of Finance between 1973 and 1977.

== Career ==
De Goede was born on 21 May 1928 in Vlaardingen. He attended the Middelbare Handelsschool (trade school) and subsequently followed a three-year course in tax law. In 1947 he started working for the Tax and Customs Administration in Schiedam. From 1951 he held jobs as an assistant to the managing board, assistant accountant and adjunct secretary at an economic/judicial advise agency. In 1956, he started as a financial administrator at the Reactor Centrum Nederland.

De Goede became politically active for the Democrats 66 in 1967, when he became a member of the House of Representatives after the general election of February. He was one of the first seven members of Democrats 66 in the House. In the House he was part of a Kingdom of the Netherlands commission tasked with exploring the future relationships within the Kingdom. He served in the House until being appointed as State Secretary for Finance in the Den Uyl cabinet on 11 May 1973. During this period, he was responsible for an important revision of the Comptabiliteitswet in 1976. De Goede stayed on until the end of the cabinet in December 1977.

Two years later De Goede was elected to the European Parliament. De Goede had been lijsttrekker for the Democrats 66 in the election. He served as member of the parliament between 17 July 1979 and 23 July 1984. De Goede returned to the national political level for a one-year stint in the Senate, where he served from 3 June 1986 to 23 June 1987.

De Goede was made a Knight in the Order of the Netherlands Lion on 11 April 1978. He died in Zoeterwoude on 16 May 2016.

== Decorations ==
Honours
Ribbon bar	Honour	Country	Date
	Knight of the Order of the Netherlands Lion	Netherlands	11 April 1978

Political offices
Preceded by Willem Scholten	State Secretary for Finance; 1973–1977; Served alongside: Fons van der Stee (1973); Martin van Rooijen (1973–1977)	Succeeded by Ad Nooteboom
Preceded by Fons van der Stee	State Secretary for Finance; 1973–1977; Served alongside: Fons van der Stee (1973); Martin van Rooijen (1973–1977)	Succeeded by Ad Nooteboom
