= Martine Baay-Timmerman =

Dutch politician

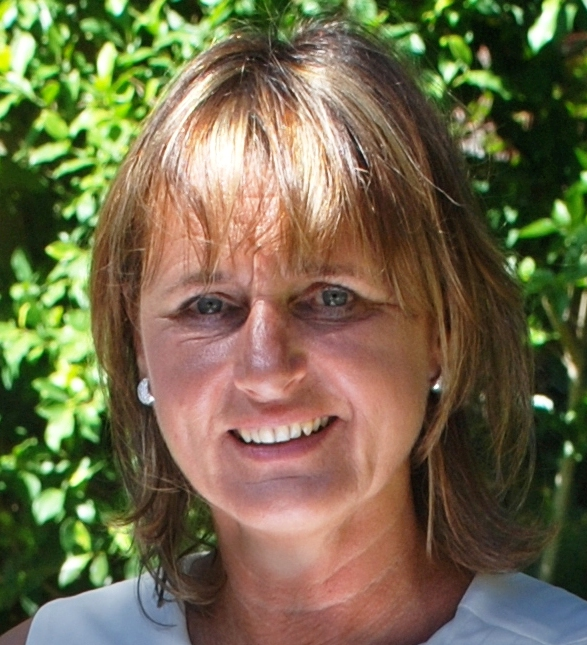

Member of the Senate
- Incumbent
- Assumed office 28 March 2017

Member of the House of Representatives
- In office 29 October 2013 – 10 September 2014

Personal details
- Born: 16 January 1958 (age 68) Haarlem, Netherlands
- Party: 50PLUS

Martine Baay-Timmerman (born 16 January 1958) is a Dutch politician. She was member of the House of Representatives of the Netherlands for 50PLUS between 29 October 2013 and 10 September 2014. She left the House of Representatives due to health issues and was replaced by Henk Krol. Since 28 March 2017 Baay-Timmerman is a member of the Senate.

== Career ==
Baay-Timmerman studied law at the Vrije Universiteit in Amsterdam, she later worked as a lawyer for twelve years.

Since early 2009 Baay-Timmerman has been involved with 50PLUS, she was a secretary for the party between November 2011 and November 2012. She was third on the candidate list of 50PLUS for the 2012 elections.

When House of Representatives member Henk Krol resigned on 4 October 2013, Baay-Timmerman, as first candidate on the list, was likely to become his successor. She entered the House on 29 October 2013. On 10 September 2014 she went on sick leave and was replaced by Henk Krol. In December 2014 it became clear that Baay-Timmerman would not return do the House of Representatives as she needed more time to recuperate from breast cancer.

On 28 March 2017 Baay-Timmerman became a member of the Senate, she took over the seat from Martin van Rooijen who became member of the House.
