= Jan Struijs =

Dutch politician

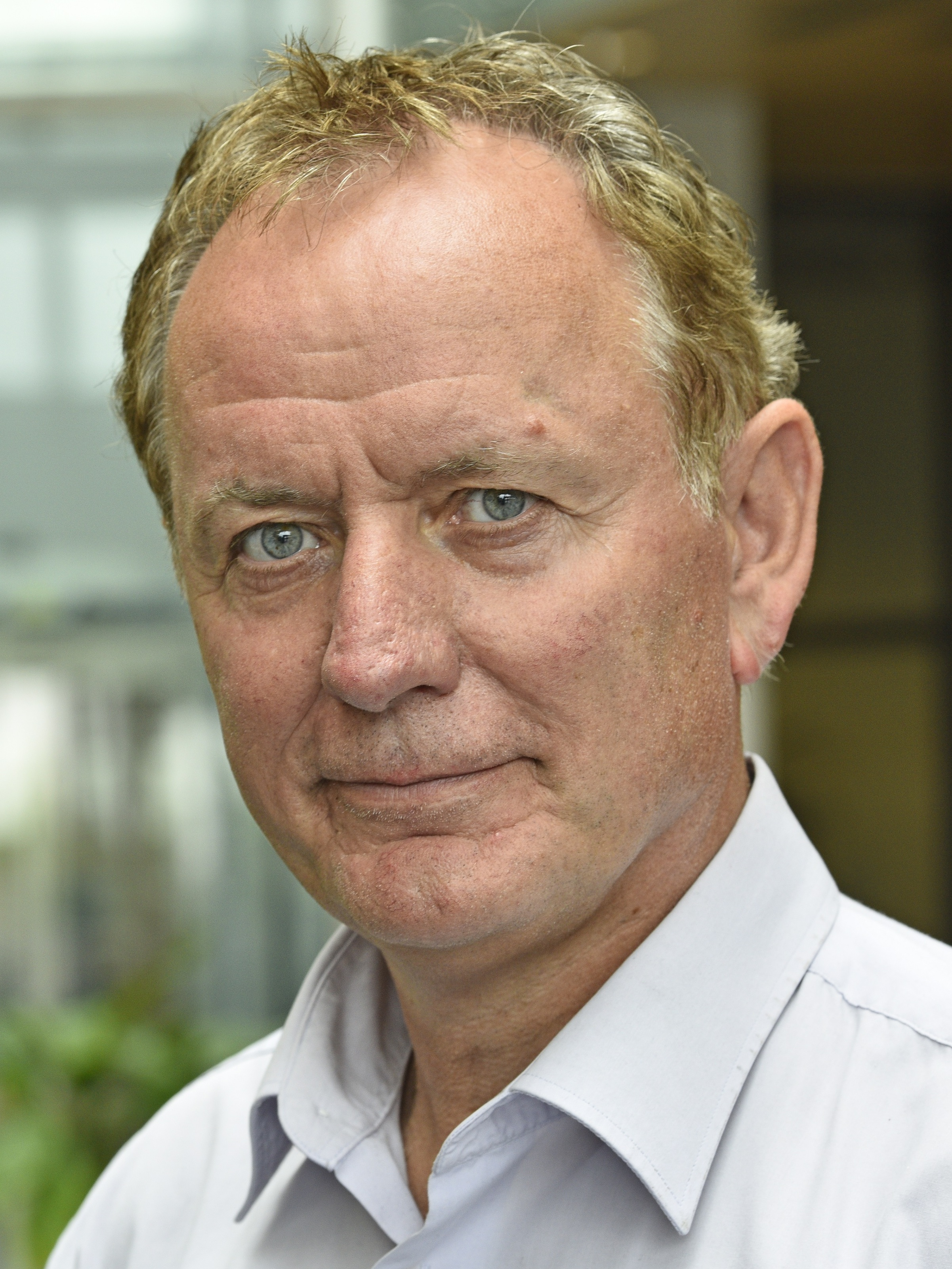
- Struijs in 2017

Member of the House of Representatives
- Incumbent
- Assumed office 12 November 2025

President of the Dutch Police Union
- In office May 2016 – 1 December 2023
- Preceded by: Han Busker
- Succeeded by: Nine Kooiman

Personal details
- Born: Jan Albert Struijs; 8 August 1961 (age 64) Vlaardingen, Netherlands
- Party: 50Plus
- Spouse: Mirjam Struijs
- Children: 3
- Occupation: Police officer • Teacher

Jan Albert Struijs (born 8 August 1961) is a police officer and teacher who was the President of the Dutch Police Union (NPB) from May 2016 to 1 December 2023. Before that, he was active in various positions within the police for 33 years.

In August 2025, Struijs was nominated by the 50PLUS party board as the party's top candidate for the House of Representatives elections of 29 October that year.
