= Provincial Council of Limburg =

Provincial council in Limburg, Netherlands

Provincial Council of Limburg Provinciale Staten van Limburg

Type
- Type: Unicameral

Leadership
- President: Emile Roemer (SP)
- Seats: 47

Meeting place
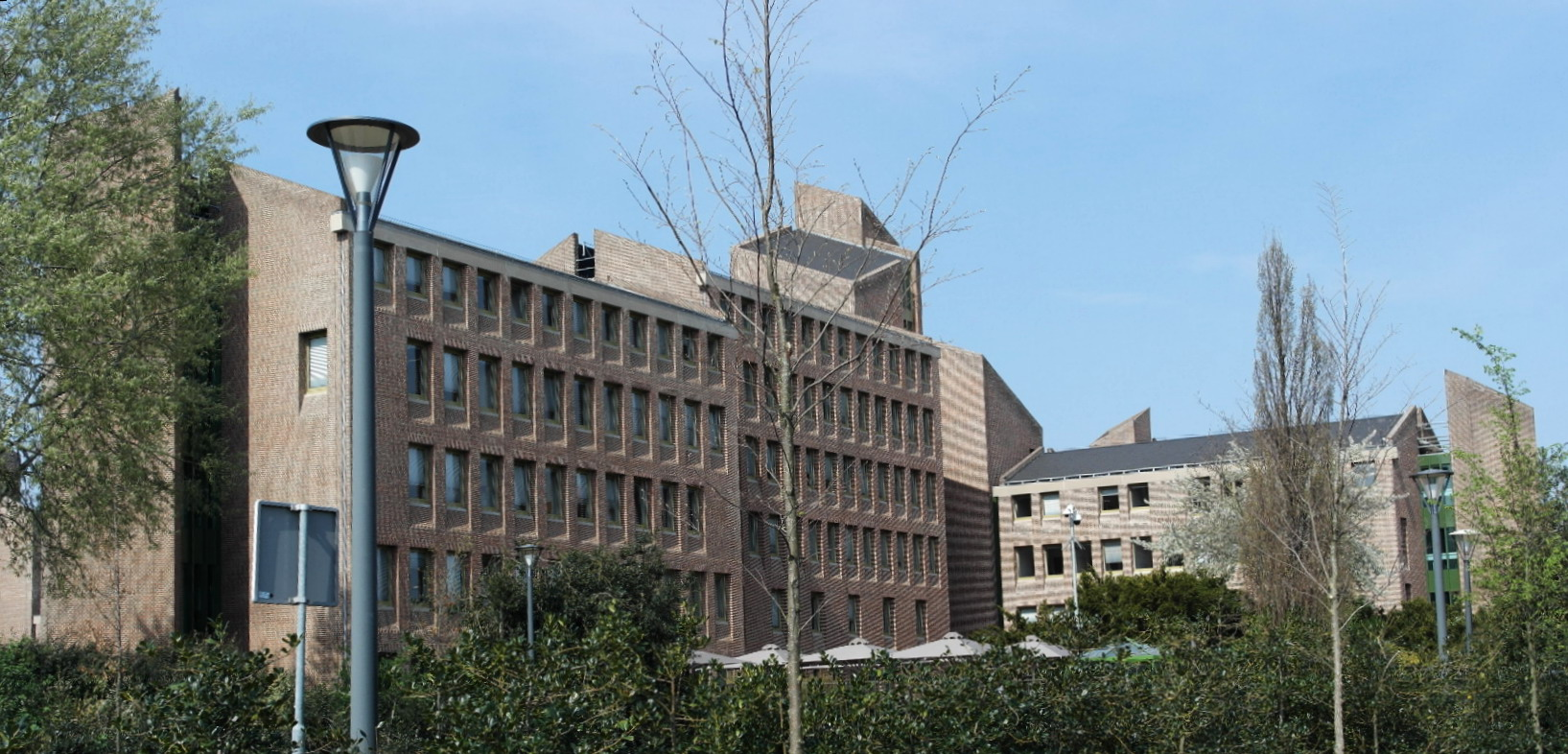
- Meeting place of the Provincial Council of Limburg on the Meuse in Maastricht

The Provincial Council of Limburg (Dutch: Provinciale Staten van Limburg), also called Limburgs Parlement, are the provincial council for the Dutch province of Limburg. It forms the legislative body of the province. Its 47 seats are distributed every four years in provincial elections.

== Current composition ==
Since the 2023 provincial elections, the distribution of seats of the Provincial Council of Limburg has been as follows:

Graph of the party split among 47 seats.
Party	Votes	%	+/–	Seats	+/–
Farmer–Citizen Movement	86,392	18.47	New	10	New
Party for Freedom	59,290	12.68	–0.87	6	–1
People's Party for Freedom and Democracy	44,736	9.56	–0.60	5	0
Christian Democratic Appeal	43,319	9.26	–9.39	5	–4
GroenLinks	40,819	8.73	+0.32	4	0
Labour Party	32,646	6.98	+0.45	3	0
Socialist Party	31,213	6.67	–2.01	3	–1
Democrats 66	28,401	6.07	+0.27	3	0
Local Limburg	20,128	4.30	+0.24	2	0
JA21	19,170	4.10	New	2	New
Party for the Animals	17,574	3.76	–0.08	2	0
Forum for Democracy	15,876	3.39	–11.18	1	–6
50PLUS	11,773	2.52	–1.24	1	0
Limburg Seniors Party	4,136	0.88	New	0	New
BVNL	4,013	0.86	New	0	New
Christian Union	3,464	0.74	–0.33	0	0
General Water Board Party	2,598	0.56	New	0	New
Look Back!	1,320	0.28	New	0	New
Jesus Lives	631	0.13	New	0	New
Heart for Freedom	228	0.05	New	0	New
Total	467,727	100.00	–	47	–
Valid votes	467,727	99.28			
Invalid votes	1,293	0.27			
Blank votes	2,078	0.44			
Total votes	471,098	100.00			
Registered voters/turnout	873,557	53.93	+1.36		
Source: Kiesraad

== See also ==
- Provincial politics in the Netherlands
