= Provincial Council of Overijssel =

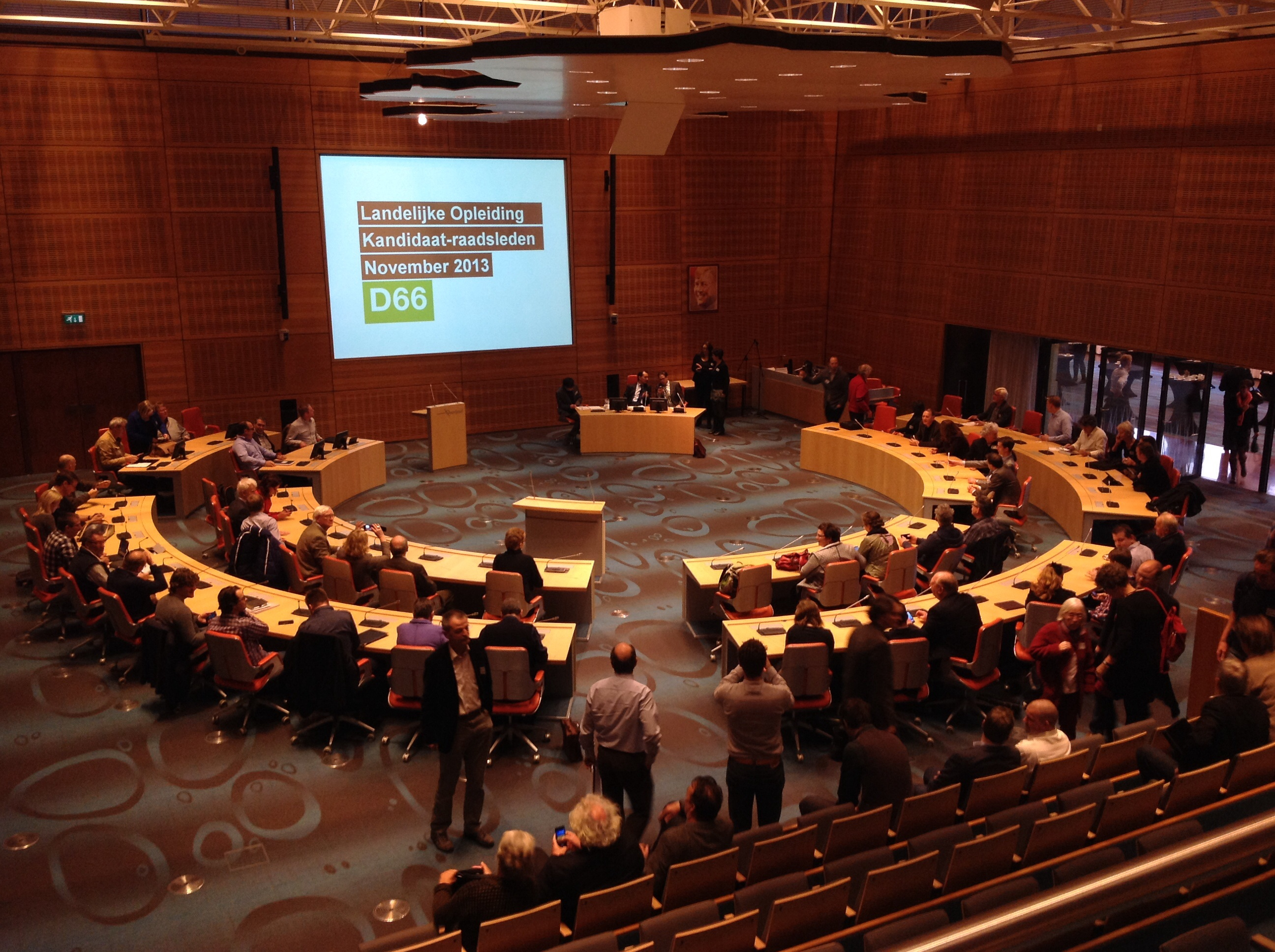
The chamber of the Provincial Council of Overijssel in the Provinciehuis in Zwolle.

The Provincial Council of Overijssel (Dutch: Staten van Overijssel, pronounced [ˈstaːtə(ɱ) vɑn ˌoːvərˈɛisəl]) is the provincial council for the Dutch province of Overijssel. It forms the legislative body of the province. Its 47 seats are distributed every four years in provincial elections.

== Current composition ==
Since the 2023 provincial elections, the distribution of seats of the Provincial Council of Overijssel has been as follows:

Party	Votes	%	+/–	Seats	+/–
Farmer–Citizen Movement	185,921	31.45	New	17	New
Christian Democratic Appeal	48,488	8.20	–8.90	4	–5
People's Party for Freedom and Democracy	47,074	7.96	–4.98	4	–2
GroenLinks	43,825	7.41	–2.07	4	–1
Labour Party	39,599	6.70	–1.80	3	–1
Christian Union	34,807	5.89	–2.37	3	–1
Party for Freedom	28,864	4.88	–2.30	2	–1
Reformed Political Party	21,621	3.66	–0.25	2	0
Democrats 66	21,270	3.60	–2.17	2	–1
JA21	21,046	3.56	New	2	New
Party for the Animals	21,010	3.55	+0.52	1	0
Socialist Party	17,632	2.98	–2.90	1	–2
Volt	17,617	2.98	New	1	New
Forum for Democracy	16,091	2.72	–10.55	1	–5
Together Local Twente	9,035	1.53	New	0	New
50PLUS	7,114	1.20	–2.23	0	–1
Alliance	4,794	0.81	New	0	New
BVNL	4,615	0.78	New	0	New
Jesus Lives	701	0.12	New	0	New
Total	591,124	100.00	–	47	–
Valid votes	591,124	99.48			
Invalid votes	1,419	0.24			
Blank votes	1,675	0.28			
Total votes	594,218	100.00			
Registered voters/turnout	913,363	65.06	+5.79		
Source: Kiesraad

== See also ==
- Provincial politics in the Netherlands
