= Provincial Council of North Brabant =

Type
- Type: Provincial council

Leadership
- President: Ina Adema (VVD)
- Secretary: Kirsten ten Cate

Structure
- Seats: 55
- Political groups: Government (28): VVD (9); GL (5); SP (4); PvdA (4); D66 (4); LB (2); Opposition (27): BBB (11); CDA (4); PVV (4); PvdD (2); JA21 (2); FvD (1); 50+ (1); CU-SGP (1); Volt (1)

Elections
- Last election: 15 March 2023

Meeting place
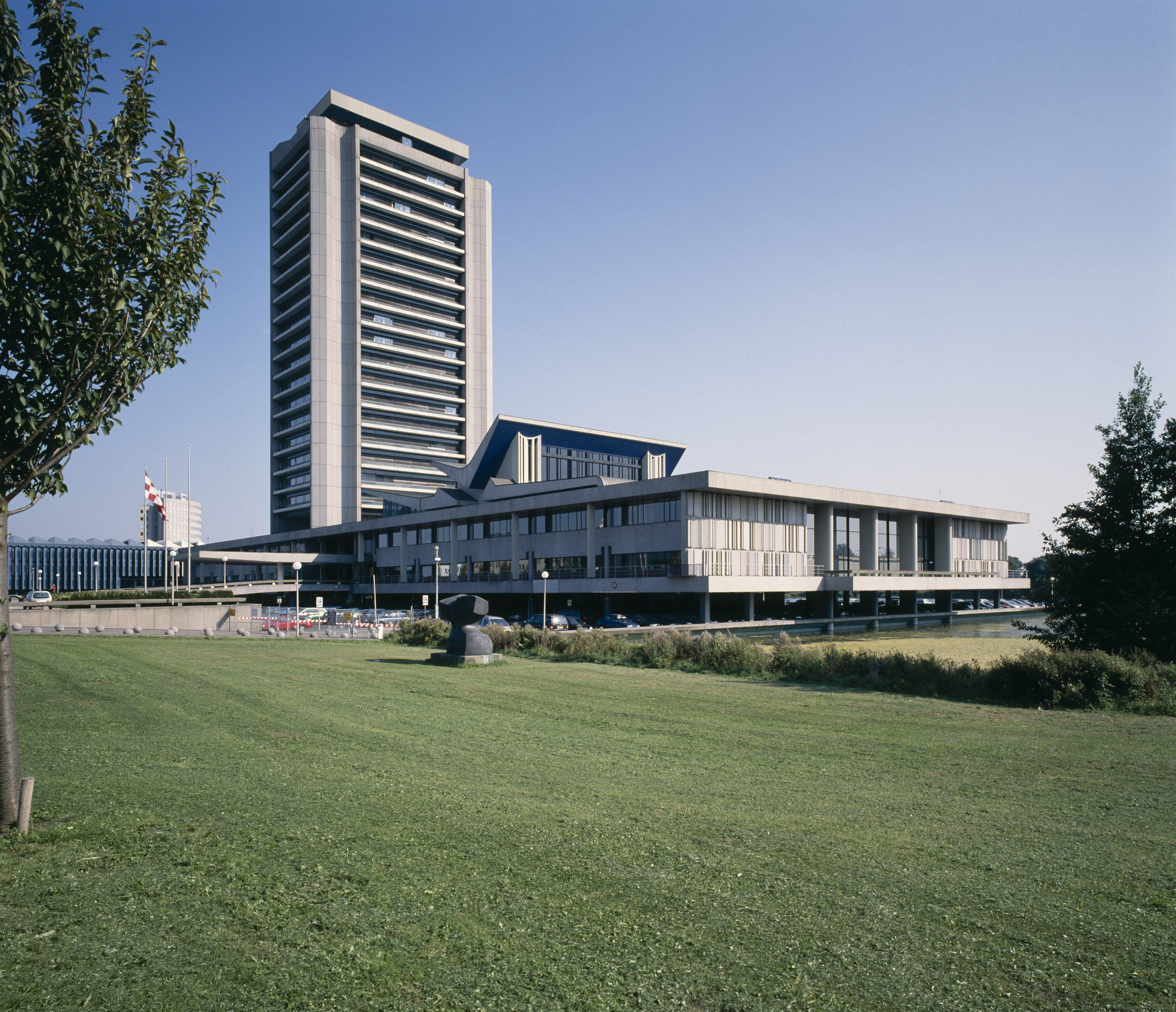
- Meeting place of the Provincial Council of North Brabant in 's-Hertogenbosch

The Provincial Council of North Brabant (Dutch: Provinciale Staten van Noord-Brabant), also known as the States of North Brabant, is the provincial council of North Brabant, Netherlands. It forms the legislative body of the province. Its 55 seats are distributed every four years in provincial elections.

== Historic composition ==
Seats in the States-Provincial, excluding mid-term splits
| Party | 2007 | 2011 | 2015 | 2019 | 2023 |
|---|---|---|---|---|---|
| BBB | - | - | - | - | 11 |
| VVD | 11 | 12 | 10 | 10 | 9 |
| FvD | - | - | - | 9 | 1 |
| CDA | 18 | 10 | 9 | 8 | 4 |
| SP | 12 | 8 | 9 | 5 | 4 |
| D66 | 1 | 5 | 7 | 5 | 4 |
| GL | 2 | 3 | 3 | 5 | 5 |
| PVV | - | 8 | 7 | 4 | 4 |
| PvdA | 8 | 7 | 4 | 3 | 4 |
| 50+ | - | 1 | 2 | 2 | 1 |
| PvdD | 1 | 1 | 2 | 2 | 2 |
| LB | - | - | 1 | 1 | 2 |
| CU–SGP | 1 | 0 | 1 | 1 | 1 |
| BP | 1 | - | - | - | - |
| JA21 | - | - | - | - | 2 |
| Volt | - | - | - | - | 1 |
| Total | | | | | 55 |

== See also ==
- States of Brabant
- Provincial politics in the Netherlands
