= States-General =

The word States-General, or Estates-General, may refer to:

Currently in use

- Estates-General on the Situation and Future of the French Language in Quebec, the name of a commission set up by the government of Quebec on June 29, 2000
- States General of the Netherlands (Staten-Generaal) is the bicameral parliament of present-day Netherlands. It evolved from the pre-democratic government of the Seventeen Provinces, out of which the Dutch Republic (officially named United Provinces) emerged.

Historically

- Estates General (France) (before 1789)
- Estates General of 1789 (France)
- States General of the Batavian Republic (Dutch republic immediately prior to the French Revolution)
- Estates General of French Canada (1967–69)
- Junta de Braços (States-General of Catalonia), a consultative body of the Generalitat of Catalonia during the early modern age.

== See also ==
- The Estates
- Estates of the realm
- Parliament of Scotland
