= Norbert Klein (politician) =

Dutch politician (1956–2021)

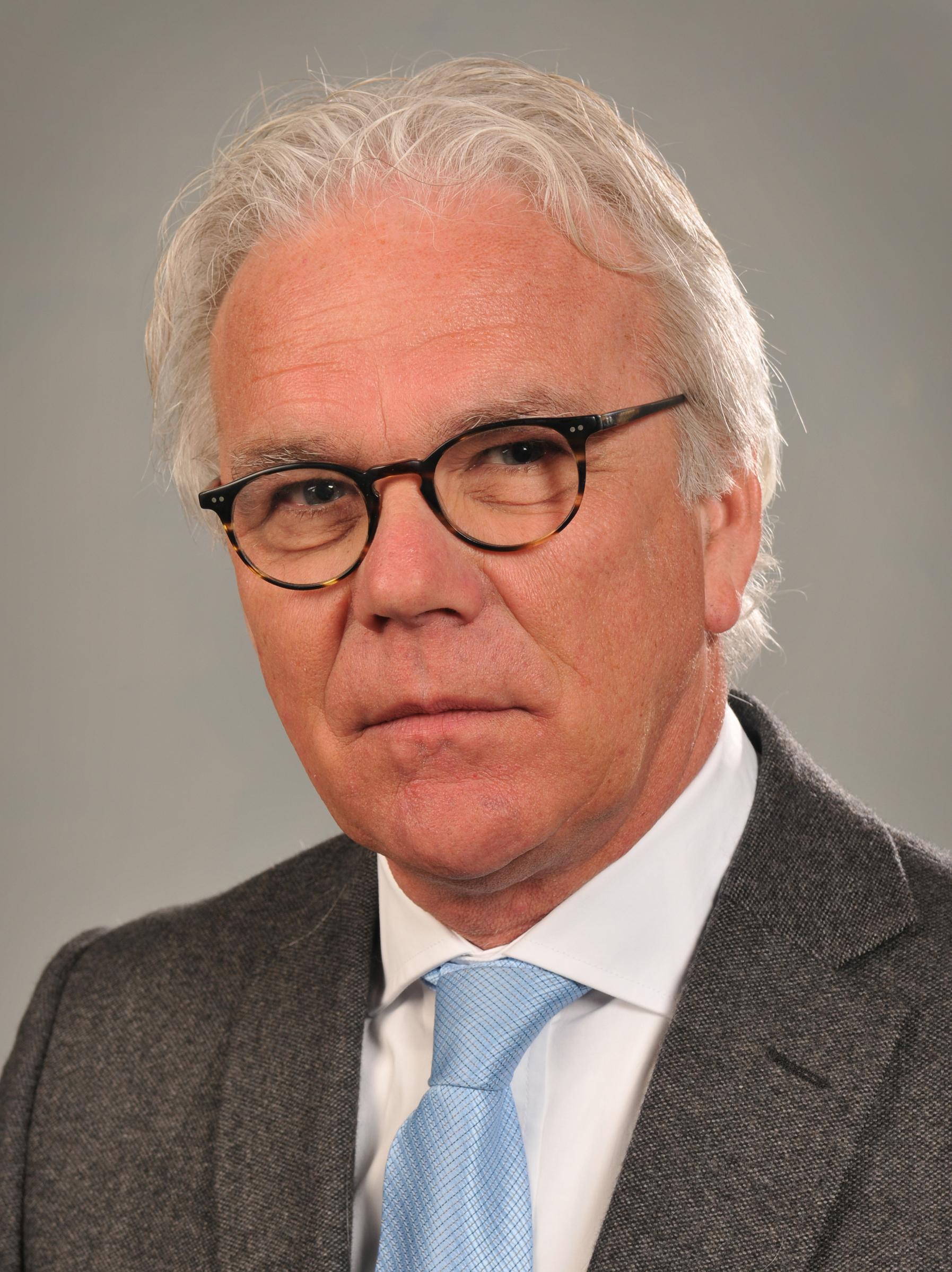

Member of the House of Representatives
- In office 20 September 2012 – 23 March 2017

Personal details
- Born: 1 March 1956 Hengelo, Netherlands
- Died: 31 August 2021 (aged 65)
- Party: Vrijzinnige Partij
- Other political affiliations: 50PLUS (2012–2014); People's Party for Freedom and Democracy (until 2006)
- Occupation: Subsidies advisor

Norbert Pieter Marie Klein (1 March 1956 – 31 August 2021) was a Dutch politician. As a member of 50PLUS, he was an MP between 20 September 2012 and 23 March 2017. He left 50PLUS in 2014 and continued as an independent. As a member of the People's Party for Freedom and Democracy (VVD) he was a member of the municipal council of Nijmegen from 1982 to 1989, and a member of the Provincial Council of Gelderland from 1991 to 2003. In 2006, he left the VVD.

In 2005, he was chairman ad interim of Dutch public broadcasting association AVRO.

Klein was born in Hengelo and studied law at Radboud University Nijmegen. He resided in Hoevelaken until his death, aged 65, in 2021.
