= Martin van Rooijen =

Dutch politician (born 1942)

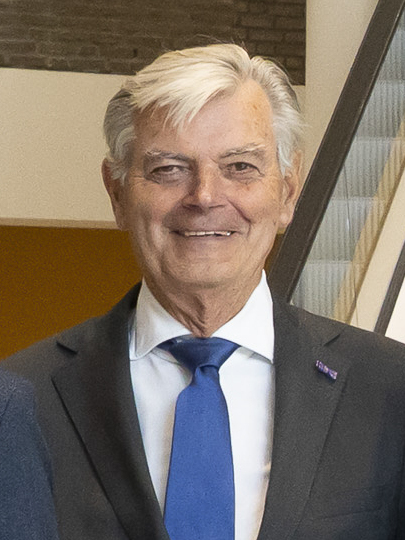
- Van Rooijen in 2025

Member of the Senate
- Incumbent
- Assumed office 11 June 2019
- In office 9 June 2015 – 23 March 2017

Member of the House of Representatives
- In office 23 March 2017 – 11 June 2019
- In office 1 November 1977 – 1 September 1980

State Secretary for Finance
- In office 21 December 1973 – 14 October 1977 Serving with Aar de Goede
- Prime Minister: Joop den Uyl
- Preceded by: Fons van der Stee
- Succeeded by: Aar de Goede

Personal details
- Born: Martinus Johannes van Rooijen; 31 July 1942 (age 84) Drunen, Netherlands
- Party: 50PLUS (since 2015)
- Other political affiliations: Catholic People's Party (1959–1980); Christian Democratic Appeal (1980–2015)
- Children: 3
- Education: Netherlands School of Economics (Bachelor of Economics, Master of Economics)
- Occupation: Politician · civil servant · Economist · Management consultant · Financial adviser · Businessman · Corporate director · Nonprofit director · Sport administrator · Lobbyist

Martinus Johannes "Martin" van Rooijen (born 31 July 1942) is a Dutch politician and businessman. A member of the 50PLUS (50+) party, he was previously part of the defunct Catholic People's Party (KVP), now merged into the Christian Democratic Appeal (CDA) party He is the parliamentary leader of 50PLUS in the Senate and a Member of the Senate since 11 June 2019.

== Electoral history ==
Electoral history of Martin van Rooijen
Year	Body	Party	Pos.	Votes	Result		Ref..
Year	Body	Party	Pos.	Votes	Party seats	Individual	Ref..
1994	House of Representatives	Christian Democratic Appeal	45	464	34	Lost	
2015	Senate	50PLUS	2		2	Won	
2017	House of Representatives	50PLUS	3	9,096	4	Won	
2019	Provincial Council of South Holland	50PLUS	18	2,725	2	Lost	
2019	European Parliament	50PLUS	25	1,398	1	Lost	
2019	Senate	50PLUS	1		2	Won	
2022	Rotterdam Municipal Council	50PLUS	38		1	Lost	
2024	European Parliament	50PLUS	50 (Note: Van Rooijen participated as lijstduwer.)	1,040	0	Lost	
2025	House of Representatives	50PLUS	50	799	2	Lost	

== Decorations ==
Honours
Ribbon bar	Honour	Country	Date	Comment
	Knight of the Order of the Netherlands Lion	Netherlands	11 April 1978	

== Notes ==
Political offices
Preceded by Fons van der Stee	State Secretary for Finance; 1973–1977; Served alongside: Aar de Goede	Succeeded by Ad Nooteboom
