= Provincial Council of Gelderland =

Provincial council in Gelderland, Netherlands

Type
- Type: Provincial council

Leadership
- President: Daniël Wigboldus
- Secretary: Franske van Hooijdonk

Structure
- Seats: 55
- Political groups: Government (30): BBB (14); VVD (6); CDA (4); CU (3); SGP (3); Opposition (25): GL (5); PvdA (5); D66 (3); PVV (2); PvdD (2); Volt (2); JA21 (2); SP (2); FvD (1); 50+ (1)

Elections
- Last election: 15 March 2023

Meeting place
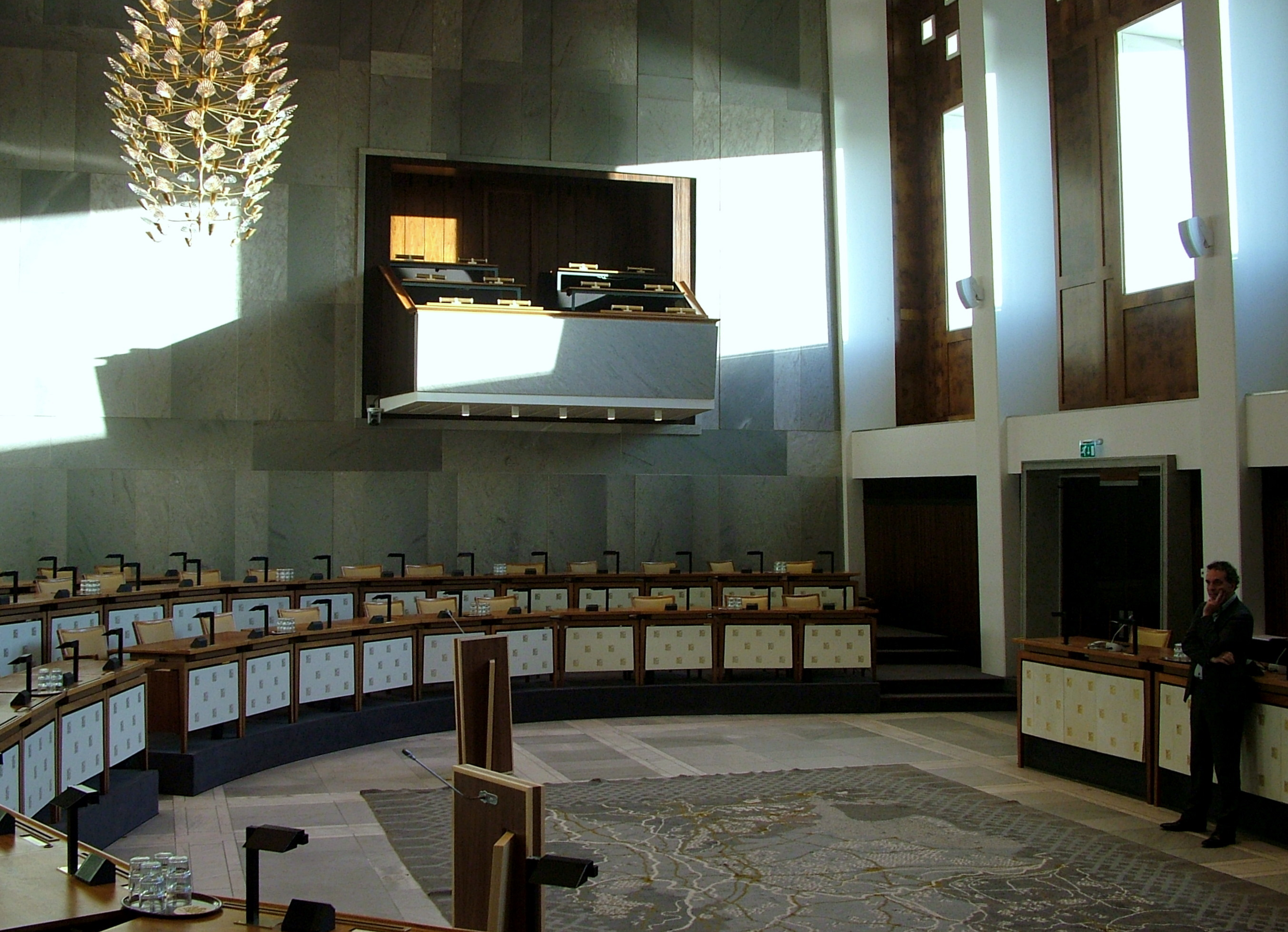
- Meeting place of the Provincial Council of Gelderland in Arnhem

Website
- www.gelderland.nl/themas/politiek/

The States of Gelderland (Dutch: Staten van Gelderland, pronounced [ˈstaːtə(ɱ) vɑŋ ˈɣɛldərˌlɑnt]) are the States-Provincial for the Dutch province of Gelderland. It forms the legislative body of the province. Its 55 seats are distributed every four years in provincial elections. From 2005 till early 2019, it was chaired by Clemens Cornielje (VVD).

== Current composition ==
Since the 2023 provincial elections, the distribution of seats of the Provincial Council of Gelderland has been as follows:

Party	Votes	%	+/–	Seats	+/–
Farmer–Citizen Movement	244,553	23.59	New	14	New
People's Party for Freedom and Democracy	103,454	9.98	–3.98	6	–2
Labour Party	92,417	8.92	+0.59	5	0
GroenLinks	84,323	8.13	–2.70	5	–1
Christian Democratic Appeal	72,703	7.01	–4.57	4	–3
Christian Union	57,355	5.53	–1.25	3	–1
Democrats 66	54,943	5.30	–1.90	3	–1
Reformed Political Party	52,420	5.06	–0.19	3	0
Party for the Animals	46,502	4.49	+0.03	2	0
Party for Freedom	42,578	4.11	–1.95	2	–1
Volt	38,371	3.70	New	2	New
JA21	36,402	3.51	New	2	New
Socialist Party	36,090	3.48	–2.35	2	–1
Forum for Democracy	26,447	2.55	–10.88	1	–7
50PLUS	20,078	1.94	–1.87	1	–1
Local Parties Gelderland	16,512	1.59	+0.41	0	0
BVNL	6,812	0.66	New	0	New
OUR Gelderland	4,680	0.45	New	0	New
Total	1,036,640	100.00	–	55	–
Valid votes	1,036,640	99.49			
Invalid votes	2,120	0.20			
Blank votes	3,192	0.31			
Total votes	1,041,952	100.00			
Registered voters/turnout	1,618,965	64.36	+5.81		
Source: Kiesraad

== Past election results ==
Year	2011			2015			2019		
Party	Votes		Seats	Votes		Seats	Votes		Seats
Party	#	%	Seats	#	%	Seats	#	%	Seats
People's Party for Freedom and Democracy	170,939	19.15	11	122,452	15.79	9	130,537	13.96	8
Forum for Democracy							125,551	13.43	8
Christian Democratic Appeal	144,467	16.18	9	116,322	15.00	9	108,248	11.58	7
GreenLeft	55,487	6.21	4	44,277	5.71	3	101,231	10.83	6
Labour Party	148,023	16.58	9	70,093	9.04	6	77,931	8.33	5
Democrats 66	71,951	8.06	4	97,845	12.62	7	67,279	7.20	4
ChristianUnion	43,436	4.86	3	47,444	6.12	4	63,364	6.78	4
Party for Freedom	92,563	10.37	6	75.356	9.72	5	56,633	6.06	3
Socialist Party	87,088	9.75	5	85.260	11.00	6	54,510	5.83	3
Reformed Political Party	40,604	4.55	2	46,395	5.98	3	49,097	5.25	3
Party for the Animals	16,290	1.82	1	25,924	3.34	2	41,658	4.46	2
50PLUS	17,743	1.99	1	22,271	2.87	1	35,607	3.81	2
DENK							11,298	1.21	0
Local parties - Code Orange							11,053	1.18	0
Jesus Lives							1,072	0.11	0
Party for Human and Spirit	2.681	0.30	0	2,481	0.32	0			
DPS/Groep van Bergen/De Groenen	970	0.11	0						
Gelderland Centre Democrats	611	0.07	0	456	0.06	0			

== See also ==
- Provincial politics in the Netherlands
