= Party for Justice, Action and Progress =

Party for Justice, Action and Progress Partij voor Rechtvaardigheid, Daadkracht en Vooruitgang
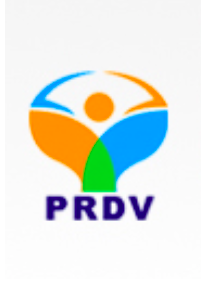
- Abbreviation: PRDV
- Founder: Peter R. de Vries
- Legalised: May 2005 (20 years ago)
- Dissolved: 16 December 2005 (20 years ago)
- Merged into: 50PLUS

Website
- prdv.nl at the Wayback Machine (archived 2006-02-02)

The Party for Justice, Action and Progress (Partij voor Rechtvaardigheid, Daadkracht en Vooruitgang) was a political party in the Netherlands without parliamentary representation. It was founded May 2005 by the crime journalist Peter R. de Vries. The abbreviation of the party's name, PRDV, is also his initials. It is the former name of 50PLUS, the Seniors Party.

On 31 October 2005, he presented his plans that mainly focused on changing the existing political culture in the Netherlands. To prove his point, he stated that an opinion poll on 16 December would decide whether he would actually continue his party or not, with a 41% cut-off point. Since only 31.4% thought De Vries would be a gain for Dutch politics, he decided to disband the party.
