= Dutch Police Union =

Logo

The Dutch Police Union (Dutch: Nederlandse Politiebond, NPB) is a trade union representing police in the Netherlands.

The union was founded on 29 January 1946, by former members of the General Dutch Police Union, the General Union of Police Personnel in the Netherlands, the Amsterdam Police Union, and the National Police Association. Each of the four unions had been dissolved by the Nazis during World War II. The new union affiliated to the Dutch Confederation of Trade Unions, and by 1964, it had 7,049 members.

The union transferred to the new Federation of Dutch Trade Unions in 1982, and by 2008 had about 23,000 members. The union championed the employment of women police officers in the 1970s, and more recently also disabled and gay officers. It has conducted independent investigations into cases of alleged corruption among higher-ranking officers.

== Presidents ==
1946: W. A. J. Visser
1949: A. Leewis
1953: A. K. Mud
1976: Leen van der Linden
1993: Hans van Duijn
2008: Han Busker
2016: Jan Struijs
