= Ad Nooteboom =

Dutch academic and politician (1928–2023)

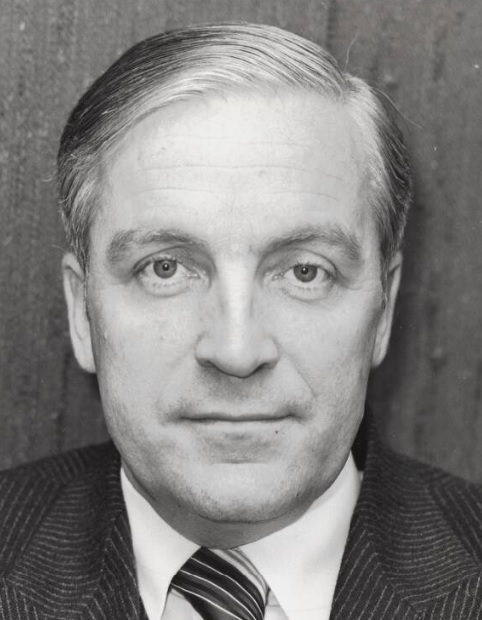
- Nooteboom in 1977
- Born: Adriaan Nooteboom; 18 July 1928; The Hague, Netherlands
- Died: 24 October 2023 (aged 95); Rotterdam, Netherlands
- Occupations: Professor, politician

State Secretary for Finance
- In office 28 December 1977 – 22 February 1980
- Prime Minister: Dries van Agt
- Minister: Frans Andriessen
- Preceded by: Aar de Goede
- Succeeded by: Marius van Amelsvoort

Personal details
- Party: Christian Democratic Appeal (from 1980)
- Other political affiliations: Christian Historical Union (until 1980)

Academic background
- Education: Rijksbelastingacademie. Leiden University

Academic work
- Discipline: Tax law
- Institutions: University of Amsterdam, University of Groningen

Adriaan "Ad" Nooteboom (18 July 1928 – 24 October 2023) was a Dutch politician of the defunct Christian Historical Union (CHU) party, later the Christian Democratic Appeal (CDA) party and professor of tax law.

Political offices
Preceded by Aar de Goede	State Secretary for Finance; 1977–1980	Succeeded by Marius van Amelsvoort
