= Brabant Party =

Dutch political party

The Brabant Party (Brabantse Partij) was a provincial political party in the Dutch province of North Brabant. It had no parliamentary representation, but it was linked to the Independent Senate Group.

Its main issues were family farmers' rights, investment in nanotechnology, information and communications technology (ICT), sport and culture, and a more open government.
