= Provincial council (Netherlands) =

Provincial legislature in the Netherlands

The provincial council (Dutch: Provinciale Staten, PS), also known as the States-Provincial, is the provincial parliament and legislative assembly in each of the provinces of the Netherlands. It is elected for each province simultaneously once every four years and has the responsibility for matters of sub-national or regional importance. The number of seats in a provincial council is proportional to its population.

== History ==
The provincial councils originated as Estates assemblies in the Middle Ages, hence the name 'States Provincial'. After the Dutch Republic was established in 1588, the States became responsible for appointing their stadtholder. The power of the cities and the nobility were mostly balanced in the States, except in the wealthiest and most powerful province, Holland, where parliament was dominated by the cities. In 1780, a total of 58 cities had representation in the States. From 1813 to 1850, the noble members of the ridderschap chose one-third of the members of the provincial councils. Johan Rudolf Thorbecke's reforms and his 'Provinces Law' (Provinciewet) of 1850 brought this privilege to an end.

== Functions ==
The provincial council chooses the provincial executive, which is the executive organ of the province. Originally, the States Provincial themselves also had executive powers and chose the provincial executive from among their own members. On 11 March 2003, the two institutions split.

The principal roles of the provincial council have become to set general policies, represent the people, approve provincial legislation and the annual budget and to oversee the executive. Both the provincial executive and the provincial council are chaired by the King's Commissioner in the province, appointed by the monarch every six years.

The last provincial elections were held on 15 March 2023.

Three months after their election, the combined members of the States Provincial elect the members of the Senate of the States General of the Netherlands.

== Number of seats in each provincial council ==
The size of the provincial councils ranges from 39 members for a province with less than 400,000 inhabitants to 55 members for a province with more than 2,000,000 inhabitants.

Before 2007, they ranged from 47 members for a province with less than 200,000 inhabitants to 83 members for a province with more than 2,500,000 inhabitants. As a consequence of a change to the Provinciewet, starting at the provincial elections of 7 March 2007, the total number of provincial councillors was reduced from 764 to 564. A survey of the change in seats per province:

Province	Seats 2003	Seats 2007	Seats 2011	Seats 2015	Seats 2019	Seats 2023
Groningen	55	43	43	43	43	43
Friesland	55	43	43	43	43	43
Drenthe	51	41	41	41	41	43
Overijssel	63	47	47	47	47	47
Flevoland	47	39	39	41	41	41
Gelderland	75	53	55	55	55	55
Utrecht	63	47	47	49	49	49
North Holland	83	55	55	55	55	55
South Holland	83	55	55	55	55	55
Zeeland	47	39	39	39	39	39
North Brabant	79	55	55	55	55	55
Limburg	63	47	47	47	47	47
Total	764	564	566	570	570	572

A consequence of this reduction in the number of seats is that the election threshold (the minimum number of votes needed for a party to gain at least one seat in an assembly) has risen. Depending on the province, the threshold now lies between 1.5% and over 2% of the votes. Because of this, it has become harder for small parties to win a seat. This may also have consequences for the representation of small parties in the Senate, which is elected by the members of the States Provincial.

== National results ==
Outcome of the provincial elections calculated at national level:
Political party	2003*	2007	2011	2015	2019	2023
Farmer–Citizen Movement (BBB)	–	–	–	–	–	137
Forum for Democracy (FvD)	–	–	–	–	86	15
People's Party for Freedom and Democracy (VVD)	103	102	112	89	80	63
Christian Democratic Appeal (CDA)	169	151	86	89	72	43
GroenLinks (GL)	37	33	34	30	61	51
Labour Party (PvdA)	150	114	107	63	53	46
Party for Freedom (PVV)	–	0	69	66	40	34
Democrats 66 (D66)	20	9	42	67	40	32
Socialist Party (SP)	29	83	56	70	35	23
Christian Union (CU)	19	35	23	29	31	22
Party for the Animals (PvdD)	0	8	7	18	20	25
JA21	–	–	–	–	–	22
50Plus	0	0	9	14	17	8
Reformed Political Party (SGP)	13	13	12	18	14	16
Denk (DENK)	–	–	–	–	4	0
Volt	–	–	–	–	–	11
GroenLinks–PvdA	–	–	–	–	–	6
CU – SGP	4	3	1	2	1	1
Pim Fortuyn List (LPF)	10	0	–	–	–	–
Regionalist parties	10	13	8	15	15	17
Total	564	564	566	570	570	572
Turnout	47.62%	46.40%	55.97%	47.76%	56.16%	58.80%

Note *: 2003 election calculated for the 2007 number of seats (564).

== See also ==
- Provinces of the Netherlands
- Interprovinciaal Overleg
- Estates of the realm, for the origin of the term
- Provincieraad, the equivalent body in Belgium
