= Léonie Sazias =

Dutch politician (1957–2022)

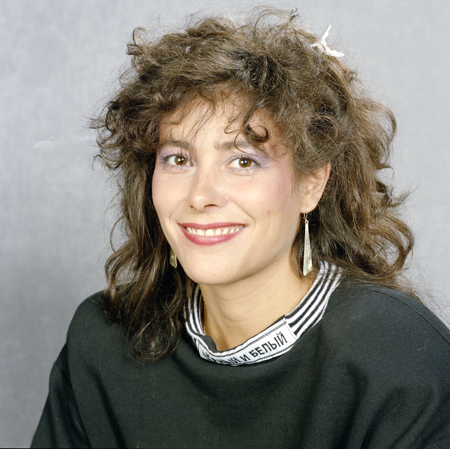
- Sazias in 1987

Member of the House of Representatives of the Netherlands
- In office 27 June 2019 – 31 March 2021
- In office 27 February 2019 – 7 March 2019
- In office 23 March 2017 – 7 November 2018

Personal details
- Born: 27 July 1957 Rotterdam, Netherlands
- Died: 3 October 2022 (aged 65) Hilversum, Netherlands
- Party: 50PLUS
- Occupation: Television host

Léonie Sazias (27 July 1957 – 3 October 2022) was a Dutch politician. A member of the 50PLUS party, she served in the House of Representatives from 2017 to 2021.

In the 1980s, Sazias was a presenter for the programme TopPop, where she interviewed acts such as Toto, The Bangles, Alison Moyet, Robert Smith, and Demis Roussos.

Sazias died of colon cancer on 3 October 2022, at the age of 65.
