= Provincial Council of South Holland =

Provincial council in South Holland, Netherlands

Provincial Council of South Holland Provinciale Staten van Zuid-Holland

Type
- Type: Provincial council

Leadership
- President: Wouter Kolff (VVD)
- Secretary: Eric Meurs

Structure
- Seats: 55
- Political groups: Government (28): PRO (9); VVD (8); BBB (7); CDA (4); Opposition (27): D66 (4); PVV (4); JA21 (3); PvdD (3); SGP (2); CU (2); FvD (2); SP (2); Volt (1); Independent (4)

Elections
- Last election: 15 March 2023

Meeting place
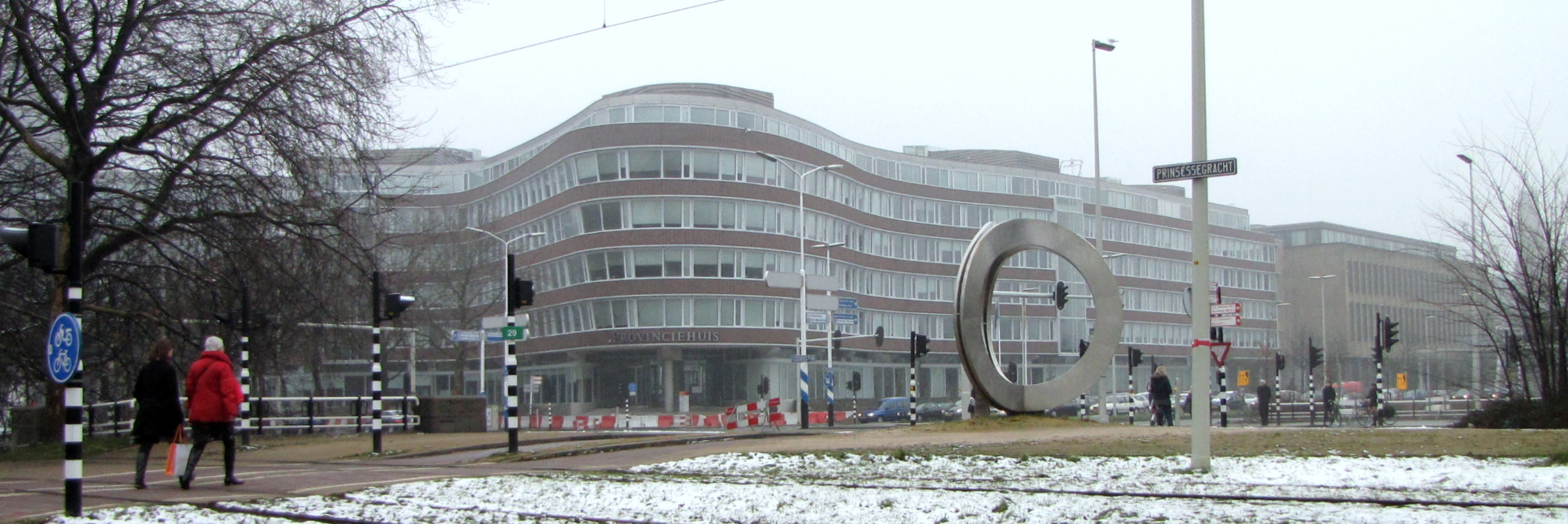
- Meeting place of the Provincial Council of South Holland in The Hague

Website
- staten.zuid-holland.nl

The Provincial Council of South Holland (Dutch: Provinciale Staten van Zuid-Holland), also known as the States of South Holland, is the provincial council of South Holland, Netherlands. It forms the legislative body of the province. Its 55 seats are distributed every four years in provincial elections.

== History ==
Before the establishment of South Holland as a province, the southern part of Holland was represented in the States of Holland by 50 of its 90 members. The States of South Holland were instituted in 1840, when the province of Holland was split in two and the province of South Holland was established. The composition of the States was determined in Royal Decrees published on 9 and 11 November, and its members were first assembled on 15 December 1840. The States comprised 10 members representing the province's aristocracy, 41 members elected by city councils, and 35 member elected by municipal councils of rural areas, making for a total of 86 members. Among the cities were Rotterdam (represented by ten members), The Hague (eight), Leiden (five), Dordrecht (four), Delft (three), Gorinchem, Gouda, Schiedam (two each), Brielle, Maassluis, Schoonhoven, Vlaardingen and Woerden (one each). All rural districts were represented by two members, except for the district of Meerkerk, which was represented by three. All members were elected to six-year terms, with a third of the seats up for election every two years. Elections were held on 1 June, while the newly elected members took office exactly a month later, on 1 July. In this period, the States of South Holland were responsible for electing the province's 12 members of the 58-member House of Representatives.

This composition was retained until 1850, two years after the Constitutional Reform of 1848, when the Provincial Act of Minister of the Interior Johan Rudolph Thorbecke introduced direct elections to the Provincial States. The States were now composed of 80 members elected directly in electoral districts, serving six-year terms, with half of the seats up for election every three years. New members still took office on 1 July, but elections were now held on the second Tuesday in May, while by-elections had to be scheduled no later than two months after the seat in question became vacant. The first direct election was held in 1852; in a transitional arrangement, the members were elected in thirteen electoral districts, each of which elected six or seven seats using a majoritarian electoral systems. In 1853, the province was definitively divided into seventeen districts, ranging in size from three to thirteen seats. Two additional seats were added in 1897, bringing the total to 82. In this period, the States were responsible for electing the province's members of the Senate.

Since 1919, the States of South Holland have been elected using party-list proportional representation in one province-wide district. In that year, terms were cut to four years, with all seats up for election at once every four years. The States were temporarily dissolved during the German occupation of the Netherlands, starting in the summer of 1941. Prominent members of the States of South Holland have included Suze Groeneweg, Dirk Jan de Geer and Pieter Oud.

== Current composition ==
Since the 2023 provincial elections, the distribution of seats of the Provincial Council of South Holland has been as follows:

Graph of the party split among 55 seats.
Party	Votes	%	+/–	Seats	+/–
Farmer–Citizen Movement	203,417	13.67	New	8	New
People's Party for Freedom and Democracy	195,478	13.14	–2.52	8	–2
GroenLinks	145,904	9.81	+0.75	6	+1
Democrats 66	112,097	7.53	–1.00	4	–1
Labour Party	103,896	6.98	–0.84	4	0
Party for Freedom	95,062	6.39	–0.61	4	0
Christian Democratic Appeal	92,531	6.22	–1.52	4	0
JA21	91,113	6.12	New	4	New
Party for the Animals	72,664	4.88	+0.51	3	+1
Reformed Political Party	61,514	4.13	+0.23	2	0
Christian Union	61,283	4.12	–1.45	2	–1
Forum for Democracy	53,067	3.57	–13.86	2	–9
Socialist Party	50,616	3.40	–0.72	2	0
50PLUS	45,186	3.04	–1.41	1	–1
Volt	42,652	2.87	New	1	New
DENK	22,068	1.48	–1.25	0	–1
BVNL	18,341	1.23	New	0	New
General Water Board Party	13,797	0.93	New	0	New
GOLD	6,105	0.41	New	0	New
Jesus Lives	1,123	0.08	+0.03	0	0
Total	1,487,914	100.00	–	55	–
Valid votes	1,487,914	99.33			
Invalid votes	4,682	0.31			
Blank votes	5,398	0.36			
Total votes	1,497,994	100.00			
Registered voters/turnout	2,747,402	54.52	+0.03		
Source: Kiesraad

== See also ==
- States of Holland and West Friesland
- Provincial politics in the Netherlands
