= Corrie van Brenk =

Dutch politician (born 1960)

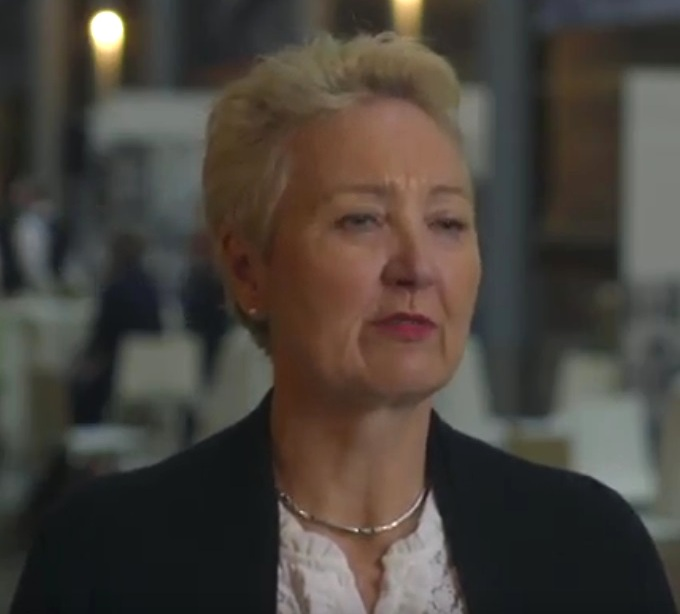
- van Brenk in 2020

Member of the House of Representatives
- Incumbent
- Assumed office 12 November 2025
- In office 23 March 2017 – 30 March 2021

President of Abvakabo
- In office July 2011 – 31 December 2014
- Preceded by: Edith Snoeij
- Succeeded by: Position abolished

Member of the De Bilt Municipal Council
- In office 11 March 2006 – 31 January 2011

Member of the Maartensdijk Municipal Council
- In office 1998–2000

Personal details
- Born: Cornelia Maria van Brenk; 16 September 1960 (age 65) Bilthoven, Netherlands
- Party: 50Plus (since 2016)
- Other political affiliations: PvdA (until 2014)
- Children: 2
- Education: Radboud University Nijmegen

Cornelia Maria "Corrie" van Brenk-van Barneveld (born 16 September 1960) is a Dutch politician, who served as a Member of Parliament for the 50Plus party. She advocates introducing compulsory licenses for drivers of motor scooters.
