= Provincial politics in the Netherlands =

The politics of the Dutch provinces takes places within the framework of the politics of the Netherlands. The province is the second-highest level of government, after the national government. The Netherlands is divided into twelve provinces.

In provincial politics there are three functions: the King's Commissioner, the States Provincial, and the States Deputed. Together they share legislative power. The King's Commissioner chairs both the States Provincial and the States Deputed. The States Deputed and the King's Commissioner exercise the executive power of the provincial government. The relationship between the States Deputed and the States Provincial is officially dualistic, that is they have separated responsibilities.

== King's Commissioner ==
The King's Commissioner (Commissaris van de Koning) chairs both the States Deputed and the States Provincial. The King's Commissioner is a member of the States Deputed and often other portfolios, including safety and public order. The King's Commissioner also has a representative role, as the head of the provincial government.

The national government appoints the King's Commissioner for a renewable six-year term. When a vacancy occurs, the States Provincial express their preferences to the Minister of the Interior and Kingdom Relations. All Commissioners are members of a national political party, but they are expected to exercise their office in a nonpartisan fashion.

== States Provincial ==
The States Provincial (Provinciale Staten, PS) is the elected assembly of the provinces. Its main role is laying down the guidelines for the policy of the States Deputed and exercising control over its execution by the States Deputed.

The States Provincial are elected every four years by the general population. All major political parties contest in the election and most of them are represented in each States Provincial. All citizens in a province have the right to vote and almost all citizens can be elected, ministers and state secretaries in the national government are barred from standing in elections as well as King's Commissioners and civil servants employed by the province. The number of members of the States Provincial depends on the number of inhabitants.

After the elections, the parties in the states elected the States Deputed. Moreover, the States Provincial also elect the Senate of the national parliament on the first day of a new term.

The States Provincial is supported by its own civil service headed by the Statengriffier. Members of the Provincial States are not paid as full-time politicians, instead, most of them have day jobs. Like most legislatures, the members of Provincial States work in both political groups and policy area related committees. The King's Commissioner chairs the meetings of the States Provincial.

== Provincial Executive ==
The Provincial Executive (Gedeputeerde Staten, GS) are executive councilors of the province. Together with the King's Commissioner, they form the College van Commissaris van de Koning en Gedeputeerde Staten, which is the executive council of the province. Members of the Provincial Executive are elected by the States Provincial. The members of the Provincial Executive all have their own competence on which they prepare, coordinate, and plan policy and legislation for the State Provincial and execute legislation. The Provincial Executive has the duty to inform the States Provincial on all aspects of their policy. The Provincial Executive functions a collegial body and most decisions are taken by consensus.

== Provincial competencies ==
Dutch provinces do not have many competencies. As the level of government between national government and the municipal government, it is responsible for those affairs for which the national government is too large and the municipalities too small. In most competencies the provinces have an executive function, executing policy that is made at the national level. The provincial competencies often shared with the national and municipal government include:

- Land management, specifically regional zoning laws;
- transport, regional infrastructure and regional public transport;
- economy and agriculture;
- environment and conservation;
- recreation, welfare and culture;
- control over water boards and the finances of municipalities.

== Finances ==
The provinces get most of their finances from the national government. Partially through the provincial fund in which the national government puts part of its tax income. This money is divided evenly over the provinces, which can spend it as they see fit. Moreover, provinces receive earmarked budgets from the national government, with which the province can take care of specific competencies such as regional public transport. Moreover, provinces can levy their own taxes. The most well known is the opcent, a small increase in the tax on cars which the provinces use for infrastructural investments. Provinces also receive administrative payments from citizens who need particular services such as environmental permits. Some provinces receive money from the Structural Funds and Cohesion Funds of the European Union. Finally some provinces have their own savings, from which they receive interest.

== Civil Service ==
All twelve provinces have their own civil service. Combined they have some 11,500 employees (2008). The head of the provincial civil service is the province-secretary.
