= 50Plus =

Dutch political party

- Leader: Jan Struijs
- Chairman: Willem Dekker
- Leader in the Senate: Martin van Rooijen
- Founded: 2009 (Onafhankelijke Ouderen en Kinderen Unie, OokU); 9 October 2010 (current name)
- Preceded by: Party for Justice, Action and Progress
- Headquarters: Kneuterdijk 2, The Hague
- Think tank: Wetenschappelijk Bureau 50Plus
- Membership (2026): ▲1,935
- Ideology: Pensioners' interests Populism
- Political position: Centre
- European affiliation: European Democratic Party (since 2023)
- Colours: Purple
- Senate: 1 / 75
- House of Representatives: 2 / 150
- European Parliament: 0 / 31
- Provincial councils: 8 / 572

Website
- 50pluspartij.nl

50Plus (Dutch pronunciation: [ˈvɛiftəx plʏs]; stylised in all caps) is a political party in the Netherlands that advocates pensioners' interests with a centrist political line. The party was founded in 2009 by Maurice Koopman, Alexander Münninghoff and Jan Nagel.

The party first participated in the 2011 provincial elections, in which it won nine provincial council seats, allowing it to be represented in the Senate by Nagel. Under lead candidate Henk Krol, the party entered the House of Representatives for the first time at the 2012 general election. On 6 May 2021, party leader Liane den Haan, its sole member in the House of Representatives, left to sit as an independent following an internal dispute. The party re-entered the parliament under the leadership of Jan Struijs after the 2025 general election.

== History ==
=== 2009–2011 ===
The party was founded under the name Onafhankelijke Ouderen en Kinderen Unie (Independent Elderly and Children Union) on 13 August 2009, formally succeeding the Partij voor Rechtvaardigheid, Daadkracht en Vooruitgang (Party for Justice, Vigour and Progress). It was an initiative of Jan Nagel together with Maurice Koopman and Alexander Münninghoff. The target audience was initially both young people and the elderly, but soon the party decided to position itself as a party for seniors. The party decided not to participate in the 2010 general election, which came to early. On 9 October 2010, the party changes it name to 50Plus, after polling by Maurice de Hond showed it to be most appealing.

The party participated in all twelve provinces during the 2011 provincial elections, winning 9 seats. Leading up to the 2011 Senate election, 50Plus made an agreement with the Independent Politics Netherlands (OSF). The regional parties had too little seats in the Provincial councils to collectively get a seat in the Senate, and two representatives of 50Plus promised to vote for the OSF to help them gain one. In return for this, 50Plus member Kees de Lange would be the OSF's lead candidate on the electoral list. De Lange left the party in 2012 after a conflict with Nagel and Henk Krol, a board member and leader of the party in the Provincial Council of North Brabant, over the party website.

=== 2012–2015 ===
The party participated in the 2012 general election with Krol as the lead candidate. The party won two seats, which were taken by Krol and Norbert Klein.

Leadership of 50Plus decided not to participate in the 2014 municipal elections and prevented discussions about this at the party congress in late 2013. In response, a few 50Plus members founded the Ouderen Politiek Actief (OPA) to participate in municipal elections. On 20 September 2013, OPA founder Dick Schouw and his partner, 50Plus board member Adriana Hernández, were expelled from the party for "repeated violation of party-established boundaries" and "breach of integrity" respectively. Krol and Nagel then opposed the expulsion. In response to their opposition, three board members resigned, including chairman Willem Holthuizen. The expulsion of Schouw and Hernández was converted into a suspension and fully reversed in November.

On 4 October 2013, he newspaper de Volkskrant revealed that Krol had not paid pension premiums when he was the owner of the Gay Krant. Krol resigned the same day as member of parliament. He was succeeded as parliamentary leader by Klein and as member of parliament by Martine Baay-Timmerman.

For the 2014 European Parliament election, the party selected as lead candidate Toine Manders, a member of the European Parliament for the People's Party for Freedom and Democracy (VVD). A few weeks before the election, NRC Handelsblad revealed that Manders was the only Dutch member of the European Parliament who had not left a controversial European pension fund. The party failed to get a seat by 3,000 seats.

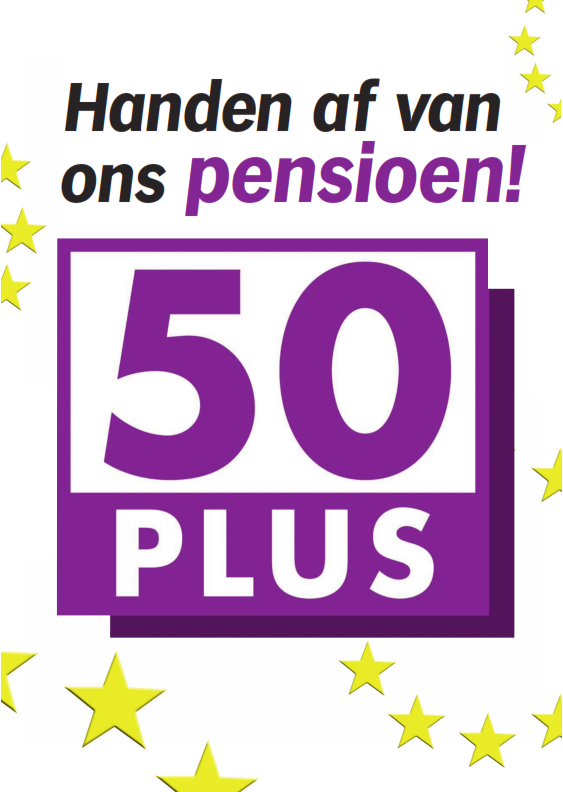
Election poster of the party during the 2014 European Parliament election in the Netherlands

On 28 May 2014, Baay-Timmerman was expelled from the parliamentary group by Klein due to an 'irreparable breach of trust.' Subsequently, the 50Plus board withdrew its confidence in Klein. Both MPs claimed to represent 50Plus, with Baay assured of the party's support. As a result, there was both the 50Plus/Baay-Timmerman and the 50Plus/Klein parliamentary group. On 10 September 2014, Krol returned to the House of Representatives because Baay-Timmerman went on sick leave and later did not return. On 13 November of that year, Klein continued as an independent MP and founded the Vrijzinnige Partij.

=== 2016–2019 ===
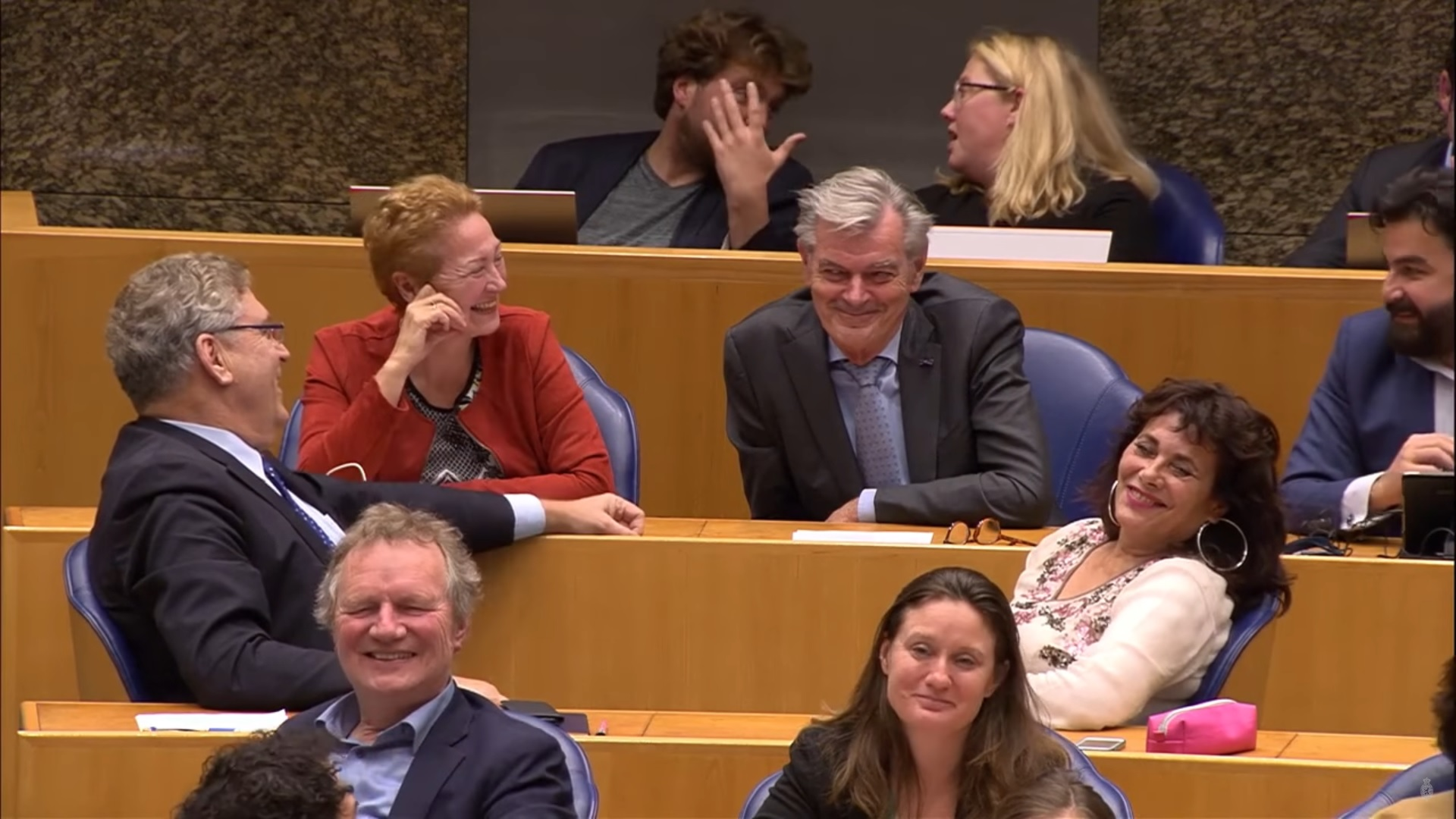
The 50Plus MPs after the 2017 general election. In the middle row are Henk Krol and Léonie Sazias. Behind them are Corrie van Brenk and Martin van Rooijen.

For the general election of March 2017, Krol was again chosen as the lead candidate. The candidate list faced much criticism and led to members leaving. The criticism was mainly focused on the high placement of candidates who had only recently become members or active, such as former TV presenter Léonie Sazias and former chair of the ABVA-KABO Corrie van Brenk. The list was eventually approved by a majority. At the start of the campaign, the party was polling at ten seats in some surveys, but ultimately secured four. According to their scientific bureau, voters were put off by the chaotic campaign. The four seats were taken by Krol, Martin van Rooijen, Van Brenk, and Sazias.

In May 2018, a long-simmering conflict within the party's board erupted. Seven of the eight members of the main board resigned, followed by the resignation of chairman Jan Zoetelief. Geert Dales became the new chairman.

=== 2020 ===
In February 2020, Krol proposed the idea of nominating Dales for a position in the House of Representatives. Other party members disagreed with this. This was followed by a period in which the involved parties treated each other poorly in various ways. Nagel announced he would file a police report against Krol for committing a criminal offense and all 50Plus members of the Senate and House of Representatives, except Krol, demanded Dales' immediate resignation as chairman. The parliamentarians accused Dales of an "autocratic and undemocratic style of leadership" and "rude language". On 26 April 2020, Dales announced he would step down. On 3 May 2020, Krol left the faction but remained an independent member of the House of Representatives. Together with Femke Merel van Kooten-Arissen (who had split from the PvdD and joined the party 50Plus, but not the parliamentary group), he temporarily formed a faction and the Party for the Future. On the same day, Van Brenk took over the parliamentary leadership from Krol.

After Krol's departure, Dales announced he would remain chairman of 50Plus until 1 August 2020. However, he eventually resigned on 24 May of that year. After Dales' resignation, Bert Kannegieter became acting chairman. He remained in this position until 1 August 2020, when Jan Nagel was again elected chairman at the party congress after a digital vote.

On 2 June 2020, the only 50Plus Member of the European Parliament, Toine Manders, switched to the CDA delegation.

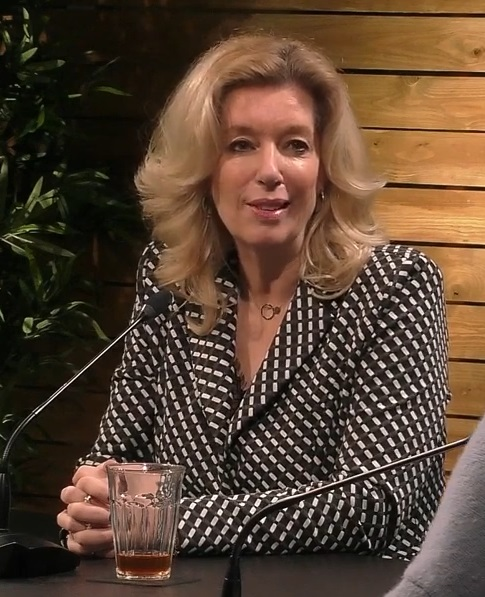
Lead candidate Liane den Haan during an interview

Liane den Haan, director of the Algemene Nederlandse Bond voor Ouderen, was nominated by the board in August 2020 as the lead candidate for the next general election, as she was deemed by chairman Nagel to be well-versed in senior citizens' issues and capable of debating well. However, the choice of Den Haan was not without controversy: as ANBO director, she was accused of dictatorial behavior and had also expressed support for a revision of the pension system, which 50Plus strongly opposed. Furthermore, she had not previously been a member of 50Plus. On 3 October 2020, party members elected Den Haan as the lead candidate. Out of dissatisfaction with the choice of Den Haan and the manner in which it was made, several prominent party members left, including former party chairman Zoetelief and the chairman of the programme committee Rob de Brouwer.

=== 2021–present ===
In the March 2021 general election, the party lost three seats. Den Haan, as the lead candidate, took the only remaining seat. On 6 May 2021, she left 50Plus out of dissatisfaction and took her seat with her. In the Provincial Council elections, 50Plus retained eight seats. After the senate election in May 2023, Van Rooijen remained as a senator. On 24 June 2023, Jorien van den Herik was elected as the new party chairman during the members' meeting.

For the November 2023 general election, the board asked former presenter Catherine Keyl, but she declined. The board then nominated Ellen Verkoelen, a provincial council member in South Holland and a city council member in Rotterdam. Former party chairman Gerard van Hooft put himself forward as candidate. Due to conflicts with the board, he was expelled shortly before the party congress on 30 September 2023, after the court had overturned a previous expulsion. When he still showed up, chaos ensued. At the request of the board, Van Hooft was removed by the police, and the congress was adjourned without electing a lead candidate or establishing an election program. The court then overturned Van Hooft's expulsion again on 6 October. During a digital vote on 7 October – two days before the election deadline – the party elected Van Hooft as the lead candidate with 51% of the votes. Verkoelen then left the party and founded the Young Seniors Union (JOU). In the election, 50Plus did not receive enough votes for a seat.

In the October 2025 general election, 50Plus was the first party since the Second World War that re-entered parliament under the same name. Jan Struijs was the lead candidate and the second seat they won was taken by Van Brenk.

== Ideology ==
50Plus specifically champions the interests of Dutch people aged fifty and above. It serves as a senior citizens party wishing to prioritize vulnerable elderly people, early retirees and those who may experience ageism in society or the workplace. The party has listed its core priorities as placing the retirement age back to 65 years, discounted rate for pensions fixed at 4% or based on realised return, abolition of inheritance tax, the establishment of a state bank and structural tax reductions for pensioners. The party is opposed to interference by the European Union over Dutch pension policy and supports reducing certain powers of the EU, and argues EU expansion can only take place by democratic consent of the people.

== Election results ==
=== House of Representatives ===
Election	Lead candidate	List	Votes	%	Seats	+/–	Government	Ref.
2012	Henk Krol	List	177,631	1.88	2 / 150	▲2	Opposition	
2017	Henk Krol	List	327,131	3.11	4 / 150	▲2	Opposition	
2021	Liane den Haan	List	106,658	1.02	1 / 150	▼3	Opposition	
2023	Gerard van Hooft	List	51,043	0.49	0 / 150	▼1	No seats	
2025	Jan Struijs	List	151,053	1.43	2 / 150	▲2	Opposition	

=== Senate ===
Election	List	Votes	%	Seats	+/–	Ref.
2011	List	2,193	1.3	1 / 75	▲1	
2015	List	4,388	2.6	2 / 75	▲1	
2019	List	5,251	3.0	2 / 75	0	
2023	List	3,264	1.8	1 / 75	▼1	

=== European Parliament ===
Election	List	Votes	%	Seats	+/–	EP Group	Ref.
2014	List	175,343	3.69	0 / 26	New	–	
2019	List	215,199	3.91	1 / 26	▲1	EPP	
2024	List	58,498	0.94	0 / 31	▼1	–	

=== Provincial councils ===
Election	Votes	%	Seats	+/–
2011			9 / 566	New
2015	204,858		14 / 570	▲5
2019	265,215		17 / 570	▲3
2023	178,014		8 / 570	▼9

== Organization ==
=== Leadership ===
- Leaders
  - Jan Nagel (10 January 2011 – 12 January 2012)
  - Henk Krol (12 January 2012 – 4 October 2013)
  - Jan Nagel (4 October 2013 – 8 October 2016)
  - Henk Krol (8 October 2016 – 3 May 2020)
  - Liane den Haan (3 October 2020 – 6 May 2021)
  - Martin van Rooijen (17 June 2021 – )
- Chairmen
  - Jan Nagel (10 January 2011 – 10 November 2012)
  - Willem Holthuizen (10 November 2012 – 2 November 2013)
  - Jan Nagel (2 November 2013 – 29 March 2014)
  - John Struijlaard (29 March 2014 – 4 June 2016)
  - Jan Nagel (4 June 2016 – 17 June 2017)
  - Jan Zoetelief (17 June 2017 – 21 May 2018)
  - Geert Dales (26 May 2018 – 1 August 2020)
  - Jan Nagel (1 August 2020 – 8 May 2021)
  - Peter Schut (8 May 2021 – 8 December 2022)
  - Gerard van Hooft (8 December 2022 – 24 June 2023, acting)
  - Jorien van den Herik (24 June 2023 – 30 March 2024)
  - Willem Dekker (30 March 2024 – )

- Parliamentary leaders in the Senate
  - Jan Nagel (7 June 2011 – 11 June 2019)
  - Martin van Rooijen (11 June 2019 – )
- Parliamentary leaders in the House of Representatives
  - Henk Krol (20 September 2012 – 4 October 2013)
  - Norbert Klein (4 October 2013 – 3 June 2014)
  - Martine Baay-Timmerman (3 June 2014 – 10 September 2014)
  - Henk Krol (10 September 2014 – 3 May 2020)
  - Corrie van Brenk (3 May 2020 – 18 March 2021)
  - Liane den Haan (18 March 2021 – 6 May 2021)
  - No representation (6 May 2021 – 11 November 2025)
  - Jan Struijs (12 November 2025 – )

== Representation ==
=== Senators ===
Member	Term start	Term end	Ref.
Martine Baay-Timmerman	28 March 2017	12 June 2023	
Jan Nagel	7 June 2011	10 June 2019	
Martin van Rooijen	9 June 2015	21 March 2017	
Martin van Rooijen	11 June 2019		

== See also ==
- Union 55+, Defunct Dutch pensioners' interests party active from 1992 until 1998.
- General Elderly Alliance, Defunct Dutch pensioners' interests party active from 1993 until 1998.
