= Opinion polling for the 2023 Dutch provincial elections =

In the run-up to the 2023 Dutch provincial elections, various organisations carried out opinion polling to gauge voting intentions in the Netherlands. In addition to national pollsters such as I&O Research and Ipsos, some local and smaller polling organisations have polled for voting intentions in specific provinces or even cities. The first opinion polls for these elections were conducted in January 2023, with final polls often being released close to the election. The elections were held on 15 March 2023.

== National ==
=== Vote share ===
Polling firm	Release date	Sample size	FvD	VVD	CDA	GL	PvdA	D66	PVV	SP	CU	PvdD	50+	SGP	DENK	Volt	JA21	BBB	BVNL	Others	Lead
2023 elections	15 Mar 2023	–	3.1%	11.2%	6.6%	9.0%	8.1%	6.3%	5.8%	4.2%	3.7%	4.8%	2.3%	2.5%	0.6%	3.0%	4.4%	19.2%	1.0%	4.2%	8.0%
Ipsos	10–14 Mar 2023	2,002	2.4%	14.2%	6.1%	9.4%	7.1%	5.8%	10.2%	6.9%	2.6%	5.1%	1.9%	1.7%	1.1%	2.2%	4.1%	16.4%	–	2.7%	2.2%
I&O Research	2–6 Mar 2023	8,196	3%	11%	5%	10%	8%	7%	9%	5%	4%	6%	1%	3%	1%	4%	6%	14%	1%	3%	3%
Ipsos	17–27 Feb 2023	5,291	3.2%	18.6%	7.1%	9.5%	6.4%	7.5%	11.2%	6.7%	2.9%	5.1%	1.2%	2.3%	0.9%	1.7%	4.0%	10.7%	0.1%	0.9%	7.4%
Ipsos	10–13 Feb 2023	1,961	3.2%	17.7%	6.5%	8.2%	6.4%	8.7%	11.5%	5.9%	3.1%	5.3%	0.9%	2.5%	1.2%	2.1%	4.1%	9.5%	0.6%	2.6%	6.2%
I&O Research	10–13 Feb 2023	2,489	3.3%	13.3%	4.8%	10.1%	8.1%	6.3%	10.7%	5.2%	3.6%	6.7%	1.0%	2.5%	1.2%	1.9%	6.0%	11.5%	0.4%	3.4%	1.8%
I&O Research	13–16 Jan 2023	2,489	2.5%	14.3%	5.3%	9.0%	6.5%	7.5%	11.0%	6.0%	3.4%	5.4%	0.6%	3.5%	1.4%	2.7%	7.0%	9.4%	0.7%	3.6%	3.3%
2019 elections	20 Mar 2019	–	14.5%	14.0%	11.1%	10.8%	8.5%	7.8%	6.9%	5.9%	4.9%	4.4%	3.6%	2.5%	1.7%	did not contest				3.4%	0.5%

== Drenthe ==
=== Seats ===
Due to an increase of population to more than 500,000 in September 2022, the amount of seats in the Provincial Council of Drenthe was set to be expanded from 41 to 43.

Polling firm	Release date	Sample size	PvdA	FvD	VVD	CDA	GL	PVV	CU	SP	D66	SLD	50+	PvdD	SGP	Volt	JA21	BBB	BVNL	Others	Lead
I&O Research	2–6 Mar 2023	688	5	1	4	1	2	5	2	2	2	1	0	1	0	1	1	15	0	0	10
Ipsos	17–27 Feb 2023	309	4	2	5	2	2	7	2	4	2	1	0	2	0	0	1	9	0	0	2
2019 election	20 Mar 2019	–	6	6	6	5	4	3	3	3	2	1	1	1	0	did not contest				0	Tie

=== Vote share ===
Polling firm	Release date	Sample size	PvdA	FvD	VVD	CDA	GL	PVV	CU	SP	D66	SLD	50+	PvdD	SGP	Volt	JA21	BBB	BVNL	Others	Lead
I&O Research	2–6 Mar 2023	688	10.4%	2.4%	8.3%	3.7%	5.6%	10.7%	4.5%	5.6%	4.3%	3.2%	1.4%	3.4%	0.4%	2.9%	2.4%	30.2%	0.7%	0.0%	19.5%
Ipsos	17–27 Feb 2023	309	9.2%	4.4%	11.1%	5.6%	5.3%	13.4%	4.8%	7.5%	5.6%	2.0%	1.7%	4.5%	0.9%	1.6%	2.2%	18.7%	1.4%	0.1%	5.3%
2019 election	20 Mar 2019	–	14.1%	13.5%	13.0%	10.5%	8.3%	7.1%	6.8%	6.5%	5.7%	4.1%	3.7%	3.4%	0.8%	did not contest				2.6%	0.6%

== Flevoland ==
=== Seats ===
Polling firm	Release date	Sample size	FvD	VVD	PVV	GL	CDA	PvdA	CU	SP	50+	D66	PvdD	SGP	JA21	BBB	BVNL	KF (Note: Powerful Flevoland)	Others	Lead
I&O Research	2–6 Mar 2023	566	2	6	4	5	2	3	2	2	0	2	2	1	3	7	0	0	0	1
Ipsos	17–27 Feb 2023	308	2	7	6	5	2	2	2	3	0	3	3	1	1	3	0	1	0	1
2019 election	20 Mar 2019	–	8	6	4	4	3	3	3	2	2	2	2	1	did not contest				1 (Note: DENK won one seat in the 2019 elections, but is not on the ballot in 2023.)	2

=== Vote share ===
Polling firm	Release date	Sample size	FvD	VVD	PVV	GL	CDA	PvdA	CU	SP	50+	D66	PvdD	SGP	JA21	BBB	BVNL	KF	Others	Lead
I&O Research	2–6 Mar 2023	566	4.8%	13.5%	8.5%	10.8%	4.5%	6.7%	5.2%	5.3%	1.4%	5.7%	5.1%	3.3%	6.8%	14.1%	2.0%	1.7%	0.5%	0.6%
Ipsos	17–27 Feb 2023	308	5.2%	15.8%	12.9%	10.0%	4.4%	5.3%	4.4%	6.5%	1.4%	6.7%	7.7%	3.7%	2.4%	6.6%	–	2.3%	4.7%	2.9%
2019 election	20 Mar 2019	–	17.8%	13.2%	9.3%	8.5%	8.3%	8.2%	7.0%	5.8%	4.9%	4.9%	4.4%	3.8%	did not contest				3.8%	5.6%

== Friesland ==
=== Seats ===
Polling firm	Release date	Sample size	CDA	FvD	PvdA	VVD	FNP	GL	CU	PVV	SP	D66	PvdD	50+	PBF (Note: Provincial Interests Frisia)	JA21	BBB	BVNL	Others	Lead
I&O Research	2–6 Mar 2023	636	3	2	6	4	2	2	2	3	2	2	2	0	1	2	10	0	0	4
Ipsos	17–27 Feb 2023	459	5	2	5	4	2	3	2	5	2	2	2	0	1	1	7	0	0	2
2019 election	20 Mar 2019	–	8	6	6	4	4	3	3	3	2	2	1	1	0	did not contest			0	2

=== Vote share ===
Polling firm	Release date	Sample size	CDA	FvD	PvdA	VVD	FNP	GL	CU	PVV	SP	D66	PvdD	50+	PBF	JA21	BBB	BVNL	Others	Lead
I&O Research	2–6 Mar 2023	636	7.5%	5.4%	11.7%	9.2%	5.1%	5.5%	4.3%	6.8%	5.5%	4.7%	5.4%	0.2%	2.7%	4.4%	20.2%	0.8%	0.6%	8.5%
Ipsos	17–27 Feb 2023	459	10.2%	5.3%	10.1%	9.2%	4.9%	6.0%	4.8%	11.0%	5.5%	4.6%	3.9%	0.3%	3.6%	3.7%	14.6%	1.4%	0.9%	4.4%
2019 election	20 Mar 2019	–	16.7%	13.4%	13.4%	9.4%	7.9%	7.7%	6.6%	5.8%	5.2%	4.1%	3.2%	2.5%	1.8%	did not contest			2.3%	3.3%

== Gelderland ==
=== Seats ===
Polling firm	Release date	Sample size	VVD	FvD	CDA	GL	PvdA	D66	CU	PVV	SP	SGP	PvdD	50+	LPG (Note: Local Parties Gelderland)	Volt	JA21	BBB	BVNL	Others	Lead
I&O Research	2–6 Mar 2023	649	6	0	2	6	3	3	3	4	3	3	3	1	1	1	4	12	0	0	6
Ipsos	17–27 Feb 2023	507	9	1	3	6	4	3	3	4	3	2	2	0	2	1	3	9	0	0	Tie
2019 election	20 Mar 2019	–	8	8	7	6	5	4	4	3	3	3	2	2	0	did not contest				0	Tie

=== Vote share ===
Polling firm	Release date	Sample size	VVD	FvD	CDA	GL	PvdA	D66	CU	PVV	SP	SGP	PvdD	50+	LPG	Volt	JA21	BBB	BVNL	Others	Lead
I&O Research	2–6 Mar 2023	649	9.5%	1.5%	3.7%	10.4%	5.3%	5.9%	5.9%	7.1%	5.5%	6.0%	5.6%	1.6%	1.8%	3.1%	6.7%	19.9%	0.4%	0.0%	9.5%
Ipsos	17–27 Feb 2023	507	15.5%	2.7%	5.4%	9.4%	6.6%	4.8%	6.1%	7.7%	5.2%	3.3%	4.1%	1.2%	3.9%	2.7%	4.7%	15.4%	–	1.2%	0.1%
2019 election	20 Mar 2019	–	14.0%	13.4%	11.6%	10.8%	8.3%	7.2%	6.8%	6.1%	5.8%	5.3%	4.5%	3.8%	1.2%	did not contest				1.3%	0.6%

== Groningen ==
=== Seats ===
Polling firm	Release date	Sample size	GL	PvdA	FvD	CU	SP	VVD	CDA	GB	D66	PVV	PvhN	PvdD	50+	SGP	Volt	JA21	BBB	BVNL	Others	Lead
I&O Research	2–6 Mar 2023	558	5	5	1	2	4	3	2	1	2	2	1	2	0	1	2	0	10	0	0	5
Ipsos	17–27 Feb 2023	404	4	5	1	2	5	4	2	1	3	4	2	2	0	0	0	0	8	0	0	3
2019 election	20 Mar 2019	–	6	5	5	4	4	4	3	3	3	2	2	1	1	did not contest					0	1

=== Vote share ===
Polling firm	Release date	Sample size	GL	PvdA	FvD	CU	SP	VVD	CDA	GB	D66	PVV	PvhN	PvdD	50+	SGP	Volt	JA21	BBB	BVNL	Others	Lead
I&O Research	2–6 Mar 2023	558	10.9%	9.9%	3.8%	5.7%	8.1%	7.7%	4.4%	3.3%	4.1%	5.0%	3.3%	5.4%	0.5%	2.1%	4.0%	1.2%	19.4%	1.0%	0.0%	8.5%
Ipsos	17–27 Feb 2023	404	7.7%	10.5%	3.5%	4.0%	9.9%	9.1%	5.8%	3.2%	6.5%	8.7%	5.1%	4.8%	–	–	1.8%	1.2%	16.9%	–	1.2%	6.4%
2019 election	20 Mar 2019	–	12.5%	12.0%	10.2%	9.4%	8.7%	8.5%	8.1%	7.3%	6.6%	6.0%	4.1%	4.1%	2.2%	did not contest					0.4%	0.5%

== Limburg ==
=== Seats ===
Polling firm	Release date	Sample size	CDA	FvD	PVV	VVD	SP	GL	PvdA	D66	LL (Note: Local Limburg)	PvdD	50+	CU	JA21	BBB	BVNL	Others	Lead
I&O Research	2–6 Mar 2023	743	3	2	10	5	4	5	3	3	0	2	0	0	3	7	0	0	3
Ipsos	17–27 Feb 2023	511	4	2	9	7	5	3	4	4	2	1	0	0	2	4	0	0	2
2019 election	20 Mar 2019	–	9	7	7	5	4	4	3	3	2	2	1	0	did not contest			0	2

=== Vote share ===
Polling firm	Release date	Sample size	CDA	FvD	PVV	VVD	SP	GL	PvdA	D66	LL	PvdD	50+	CU	JA21	BBB	BVNL	Others	Lead
I&O Research	2–6 Mar 2023	743	6.0%	5.2%	18.7%	9.8%	8.7%	10.1%	5.8%	6.4%	1.6%	3.9%	1.5%	0.6%	5.4%	12.4%	1.2%	2.4%	6.3%
Ipsos	17–27 Feb 2023	511	8.6%	4.6%	16.8%	12.8%	9.6%	6.1%	7.7%	8.4%	4.4%	2.9%	1.4%	1.1%	5.3%	7.5%	0.3%	2.5%	4.0%
2019 election	20 Mar 2019	–	18.7%	14.6%	13.5%	10.2%	8.7%	8.4%	6.5%	5.8%	4.1%	3.8%	3.8%	1.1%	did not contest			0.9%	4.1%

== North Brabant ==
=== Seats ===
Polling firm	Release date	Sample size	VVD	FvD	CDA	SP	D66	GL	PVV	PvdA	50+	PvdD	LB	CU–SGP	Volt	JA21	BBB	BVNL	Others	Lead
I&O Research	2–6 Mar 2023	650	8	2	3	4	3	5	6	4	1	4	2	1	2	3	7	0	0	1
Ipsos	17–27 Feb 2023	506	13	1	5	6	3	4	8	2	1	3	0	0	3	0	6	0	0	5
2019 election	20 Mar 2019	–	10	9	8	5	5	5	4	3	2	2	1	1	did not contest				0	1

=== Vote share ===
Polling firm	Release date	Sample size	VVD	FvD	CDA	SP	D66	GL	PVV	PvdA	50+	PvdD	LB	CU–SGP	Volt	JA21	BBB	BVNL	Others	Lead
I&O Research	2–6 Mar 2023	650	12.5%	3.7%	6.2%	6.6%	5.9%	9.0%	9.9%	7.7%	1.9%	6.8%	3.2%	2.7%	3.6%	5.5%	12.4%	1.1%	1.3%	0.1%
Ipsos	17–27 Feb 2023	506	20.9%	1.6%	8.8%	10.0%	5.3%	7.7%	12.5%	4.1%	2.5%	5.3%	1.3%	1.3%	5.3%	–	9.9%	–	3.6%	8.4%
2019 election	20 Mar 2019	–	16.2%	14.5%	13.3%	9.2%	8.8%	8.7%	7.6%	6.4%	4.1%	3.7%	2.5%	1.9%	did not contest				3.1%	1.7%

== North Holland ==
=== Seats ===
Polling firm	Release date	Sample size	FvD	GL	VVD	D66	PvdA	CDA	PvdD	PVV	SP	CU	50+	DENK	Volt	JA21	BBB	BVNL	Others	Lead
I&O Research	2–6 Mar 2023	796	3	6	8	4	6	1	6	3	2	1	0	2	3	4	6	0	0	2
Ipsos	17–27 Feb 2023	512	2	6	11	6	4	3	4	4	4	1	1	1	1	3	4	0	0	5
2019 election	20 Mar 2019	–	9	9	9	6	6	4	3	3	3	1	1	1	did not contest				0	Tie

=== Vote share ===
Polling firm	Release date	Sample size	FvD	GL	VVD	D66	PvdA	CDA	PvdD	PVV	SP	CU	50+	DENK	Volt	JA21	BBB	BVNL	Others	Lead
I&O Research	2–6 Mar 2023	796	6.1%	10.1%	12.5%	7.3%	9.4%	2.6%	9.2%	5.8%	3.9%	2.3%	1.1%	3.3%	5.6%	7.6%	10.5%	0.3%	2.7%	2.0%
Ipsos	17–27 Feb 2023	512	3.7%	11.0%	18.5%	10.1%	6.4%	6.2%	6.5%	7.2%	7.0%	1.9%	2.0%	2.3%	1.9%	5.7%	7.1%	0.8%	1.8%	7.5%
2019 election	20 Mar 2019	–	15.33%	15.26%	14.5%	9.9%	9.8%	6.8%	6.1%	5.6%	5.0%	3.1%	2.8%	2.4%	did not contest				3.4%	0.07%

==== Amsterdam ====
Polling firm	Release date	Sample size	GL	D66	PvdA	VVD	PvdD	FvD	DENK	SP	PVV	CDA	CU	50+	Volt	JA21	BBB	BVNL	Others	Lead
O&S	25 Feb 2023	1,246	18.3%	11.3%	17.5%	9.5%	10.7%	1.5%	3.5%	5.7%	2.0%	1.0%	2.1%	–	2.9%	3.2%	4.7%	–	6.2%	0.8%
2019 election	20 Mar 2019	–	23.8%	13.6%	11.4%	10.9%	8.7%	8.7%	6.0%	5.0%	3.4%	2.3%	2.1%	1.9%	did not contest				2.2%	10.2%

== Overijssel ==
=== Seats ===
Polling firm	Release date	Sample size	CDA	FvD	VVD	GL	PvdA	CU	PVV	SP	D66	SGP	50+	PvdD	Volt	JA21	BBB	BVNL	Others	Lead
I&O Research	2–6 Mar 2023	724	4	2	5	4	3	3	3	2	2	1	0	2	2	2	12	0	0	5
Ipsos	17–27 Feb 2023	513	6	1	7	4	2	2	4	3	3	2	0	1	1	1	9	1	0	2
2019 election	20 Mar 2019	–	9	6	6	5	4	4	3	3	3	2	1	1	did not contest				0	3

=== Vote share ===
Polling firm	Release date	Sample size	CDA	FvD	VVD	GL	PvdA	CU	PVV	SP	D66	SGP	50+	PvdD	Volt	JA21	BBB	BVNL	Others	Lead
I&O Research	2–6 Mar 2023	724	7.9%	3.7%	9.6%	8.3%	6.7%	5.6%	6.7%	3.8%	5.5%	3.5%	0.1%	4.0%	4.3%	5.2%	23.1%	0.9%	1.1%	13.5%
Ipsos	17–27 Feb 2023	513	11.0%	2.5%	13.8%	7.9%	5.1%	4.6%	7.7%	5.8%	6.4%	3.6%	0.2%	3.0%	2.2%	3.5%	18.0%	2.4%	2.4%	4.2%
2019 election	20 Mar 2019	–	17.1%	13.3%	12.9%	9.5%	8.5%	8.3%	7.2%	5.9%	5.8%	3.9%	3.4%	3.0%	did not contest				1.2%	3.8%

== South Holland ==
=== Seats ===
Polling firm	Release date	Sample size	FvD	VVD	GL	D66	PvdA	CDA	PVV	CU	50+	PvdD	SP	SGP	DENK	Volt	JA21	BBB	BVNL	Others	Lead
I&O Research	2–6 Mar 2023	815	1	7	5	5	4	3	6	2	1	4	2	2	1	2	4	6	0	0	1
Ipsos	17–27 Feb 2023	500	3	11	5	4	3	3	7	2	1	3	2	3	1	0	3	4	0	0	4
Motivaction	1–31 Jan 2023	800+	1	8	4	5	4	3	8	2	1	3	4	2	1	1	3	5	0	0	Tie
2019 election	20 Mar 2019	–	11	10	5	5	4	4	4	3	2	2	2	2	1	did not contest				0	1

=== Vote share ===
Polling firm	Release date	Sample size	FvD	VVD	GL	D66	PvdA	CDA	PVV	CU	50+	PvdD	SP	SGP	DENK	Volt	JA21	BBB	BVNL	Others	Lead
I&O Research	2–6 Mar 2023	815	2.1%	11.6%	9.4%	8.2%	8.0%	4.8%	10.2%	3.6%	1.9%	6.4%	4.7%	3.8%	2.0%	4.8%	6.8%	10.7%	0.6%	0.4%	0.9%
Ipsos	17–27 Feb 2023	500	4.7%	17.8%	8.5%	6.6%	6.0%	4.8%	11.5%	4.5%	2.4%	5.6%	3.5%	5.6%	1.9%	1.5%	6.0%	7.6%	0.6%	0.8%	6.3%
Motivaction	1–31 Jan 2023	800+	2.5%	12.0%	7.5%	7.8%	6.8%	5.1%	12.7%	3.4%	1.6%	5.4%	6.5%	3.5%	2.3%	2.8%	5.8%	8.9%	–	5.5%	0.7%
2019 election	20 Mar 2019	–	17.4%	15.7%	9.1%	8.5%	7.8%	7.7%	7.0%	5.6%	4.4%	4.4%	4.1%	3.9%	2.7%	did not contest				1.6%	1.7%

== Utrecht ==
=== Seats ===
Polling firm	Release date	Sample size	GL	VVD	FvD	CDA	D66	PvdA	CU	PVV	PvdD	SP	SGP	50+	DENK	Volt	JA21	BBB	BVNL	Others	Lead
I&O Research	2–6 Mar 2023	760	8	6	0	2	6	3	3	3	3	1	2	0	0	2	5	5	0	0	2
Ipsos	17–27 Feb 2023	503	7	9	0	3	5	3	2	5	3	2	1	1	1	1	3	3	0	0	2
2019 election	20 Mar 2019	–	8	8	6	5	5	4	4	2	2	2	1	1	1	did not contest				0	Tie

=== Vote share ===
Polling firm	Release date	Sample size	GL	VVD	FvD	CDA	D66	PvdA	CU	PVV	PvdD	SP	SGP	50+	DENK	Volt	JA21	BBB	BVNL	Others	Lead
I&O Research	2–6 Mar 2023	760	14.3%	11.0%	1.6%	5.2%	11.1%	6.4%	5.7%	6.8%	6.4%	2.7%	3.9%	1.0%	0.4%	4.3%	9.1%	8.7%	0.4%	0.7%	3.2%
Ipsos	17–27 Feb 2023	503	13.4%	16.3%	0.4%	5.6%	9.6%	6.6%	5.0%	9.8%	5.7%	3.5%	3.1%	2.0%	1.7%	3.3%	5.6%	5.2%	1.5%	1.6%	2.9%
2019 election	20 Mar 2019	–	16.1%	15.3%	11.6%	9.9%	9.4%	7.3%	7.3%	4.9%	4.7%	3.9%	3.5%	2.9%	2.1%	did not contest				1.1%	0.8%

== Zeeland ==
=== Seats ===
Polling firm	Release date	Sample size	CDA	SGP	FvD	VVD	PvdA	GL	PVV	PvZ	CU	50+	SP	D66	PvdD	JA21	BBB	BVNL	Others	Lead
I&O Research	2–6 Mar 2023	611	2	6	1	5	5		3	1	2	0	2	2	2	2	6	0	0	Tie
Ipsos	17–27 Feb 2023	259	7	4	1	7	5		3	2	1	0	2	2	1	1	3	0	0	Tie
2019 election	20 Mar 2019	–	7	5	5	4	4	2	2	2	2	2	2	1	1	did not contest			0	2

=== Vote share ===
Polling firm	Release date	Sample size	CDA	SGP	FvD	VVD	PvdA	GL	PVV	PvZ	CU	50+	SP	D66	PvdD	JA21	BBB	BVNL	Others	Lead
I&O Research	2–6 Mar 2023	611	6.0%	13.0%	2.1%	11.8%	12.2%		7.4%	4.0%	5.8%	1.6%	5.2%	5.4%	5.3%	5.0%	12.6%	2.0	0.4%	0.4%
Ipsos	17–27 Feb 2023	259	15.3%	10.0%	2.5%	15.3%	12.2%		7.7%	5.7%	3.3%	1.8%	4.6%	6.3%	3.5%	3.1%	7.6%	–	1.1%	Tie
2019 election	20 Mar 2019	–	16.3%	12.1%	11.8%	10.3%	8.4%	5.8%	6.2%	6.2%	5.2%	5.1%	4.8%	3.7%	3.5%	did not contest			0.5%	4.2%
