= Eline Vedder =

Dutch politician and farmer (born 1979)

Member of the House of Representatives
- In office 10 May 2023 – 11 November 2025
- Preceded by: Jaco Geurts

Member of the Provincial Council of Drenthe
- In office 28 March 2019 – 30 May 2023
- Succeeded by: Sonja Hilgenga-van Dam

Member of the Municipal Council of De Wolden
- In office 29 March 2018 – 25 April 2019
- Succeeded by: Tjalling de Wit

Personal details
- Born: Eline C. Monaster; 25 April 1979 (age 47) Dordrecht, Netherlands
- Party: Christian Democratic Appeal
- Spouse: Alben Vedder
- Children: 2
- Education: University of Twente
- Occupation: Dairy farmer; politician

Eline C. Vedder-Monaster (Dutch pronunciation: [eːˈlinə ˈvɛdər]; born 25 April 1979) is a Dutch dairy farmer and politician of the Christian Democratic Appeal (CDA). Born in Dordrecht, she studied mechanical engineering and started running a dairy farm in Drenthe with her husband after some years at multinational Unilever.

She joined a protest action in late 2016 after concerns about the future of the agricultural sector. Vedder subsequently started advocating for farmers in the media and joined the Netherlands Agricultural and Horticultural Association (LTO Nederland) as chairwoman of one of its chapter organizations. Vedder coordinated several actions to draw attention to farmers, and she participated in farmers' protests after a nitrogen crisis broke out in 2019 as a result of a legal decision.

Vedder became politically active for the CDA and was elected to the Municipal Council of De Wolden in 2018. She left the body the following year when she won a seat in the Provincial Council of Drenthe due to her preference votes. Her 23rd spot on the CDA's party list in the 2021 general election was not high enough to claim a seat, but she was appointed to the House of Representatives in 2023, when Jaco Geurts stepped down. Vedder was re-elected in November 2023, and she left the House after the end of her term in November 2025.

== Personal life and career ==
Vedder was born on 25 April 1979 in the South Holland city of Dordrecht. She was raised in a Dutch Reformed family, and she has a younger brother. As a result of her father's changing jobs as a mechanical engineer, Vedder moved regularly during her childhood, living consecutively in Dordrecht, Maastricht, Cadier en Keer, Soesterberg, and Amersfoort. Vedder studied mechanical engineering at the University of Twente between 1997 and 2005 and served on the boards of the W.S.G. Isaac Newton study association and the DispUIT student association. She subsequently filled specialist and management roles at the conglomerate Unilever in supply chain, product development, and process improvement including for its ice-cream subsidiary Ben & Jerry's in Hellendoorn. She also lived for some time in The Hague and Mumbai.

While at Unilever, Vedder met her future husband Alben, a farmer, and she left the company in 2010 to help him run his dairy farm, which occupies 42 hectares (100 acres) in Ruinerwold in Drenthe. It holds around 80 cows. Besides, Vedder ran a retirement home for horses on their property for a decade, she taught at a center for children with psychosocial disorders and autism, and she restored caravans from the 1960s and 1970s as a hobby. The couple's daughter and son were born in 2009 and 2013, respectively, and Vedder also has a stepdaughter. In an interview about religion, Vedder referred to herself as an omnist.

== Activism ==
=== Initial activism and media appearances ===
In September 2016, State Secretary for Economic Affairs Martijn van Dam (PvdA) proposed a system of phosphate rights for the livestock farming sector to limit its production through manure. The Netherlands had been exempted from a limit in the European Union's Nitrates Directive on the spreading of nitrogen from manure on farmland. In turn, annual phosphate production was not allowed to exceed 172.9 million kilograms (6.10×10^{9} oz) – the Netherlands' 2002 output. The abolition of a European milk quota in 2015 had led to an increased number of cows and had thus resulted in a violation of the phosphate limit. It was reported that the Netherlands was therefore at risk of losing its exemption to the Nitrates Directive. In response, dairy farmer Geert Stevens offered his boots to the state secretary in a video, saying a lack of clarity about the exemption would threaten his business. The following day, Van Dam announced that the European Commission had warned that his phosphate rights system would constitute illegal state aid and that the plans would be delayed by a year. Vedder joined Stevens' protest and posted a similar video on Facebook, in which she held Van Dam personally responsible for the farmers' uncertainty; it was watched tens of thousands of times. Stevens and Vedder became the spokespeople of the protest, which received support from the Netherlands Agricultural and Horticultural Association (LTO Nederland). More farmers uploaded videos under the hashtag laarzenactie (boots protest). Vedder repeated her concerns at a gathering of approximately a thousand dairy farmers in the IJsselhallen in Zwolle in early November 2016, at which Van Dam explained his policy and considerations. Stevens and Vedder later argued in an opinion piece that cooperation was necessary to provide a future for the sector, and they voiced their support for Van Dam's attempts to fight for his plans at the European Commission. The phosphate rights' system was eventually approved after a delay, and the Netherlands kept its exemption to the Nitrates Directive.

Vedder wrote that the agricultural sector was lacking a proper public relations campaign. She started to comment in the media on agricultural issues regularly and participated in the branded content show FoodMakers, broadcast by RTL Nederland. When she appeared in election talk show Pauw & Jinek: De Verkiezingen in the run-up to the 2017 general election, she questioned GroenLinks leader Jesse Klaver on the polarization of the issue by leftist parties that she perceived. Vedder referred to their rejection of most agricultural practices except those of organic and sustainable farming and to misleading statements about the sector. In an interview, she mentioned that she would vote for the Christian Democratic Appeal (CDA), having cast her ballot four years earlier on the People's Party for Freedom and Democracy (VVD). She acknowledged threats to the agricultural sector but also saw possibilities, calling the Netherlands a worldwide leader in new ways of farming. Vedder's frequent media appearances gained her the nickname "media farmer", while newspaper Trouw would later compare her to Caroline van der Plas – the leader of the Farmer–Citizen Movement (BBB) – for her agricultural advocacy, while noting that Vedder had started earlier.

=== LTO and continued actions ===
Vedder was appointed chairwoman of the board of the Southwestern Drenthe chapter of LTO Noord (LTO north) – one of three member organizations of LTO Nederland – when three of its chapters merged in early 2017. Before, she had been serving on the board of one of those chapters, Meppel-De Wolden-West, for a year. Vedder helped organize several actions to draw attention to her cause. In April 2017, she aided a group of farmers who wanted to erect a straw man to congratulate King Willem-Alexander on his 50th birthday – as is a tradition in the Netherlands. Vedder found a farmer near the king's residence in Wassenaar, and the final 7-meter-tall (23 ft) statue included a banner saying "Farmers for Orange". When over 100 animal rights activist occupied a farm in Boxtel in 2019, Vedder was one of the initiators of a response: farmers used about 120 tractors to spell out "#doesnormaal!!!" – roughly translating to "get a grip on yourselves" – on a field in Overijssel. Vedder declared that debates about animal welfare are welcomed but that the occupation went too far. The same year, Vedder handed a manifesto on behalf of young farmers to European Commissioner for Agriculture and Rural Development Phil Hogan, when he was visiting a CDA event in Nieuw-Namen. The Saeftinghe Manifesto called for trust between farmers and society to be restored and stressed the value of agriculture.

The Council of State decided in May 2019 that the government's program to reduce reactive nitrogen deposition was insufficient, triggering a nitrogen crisis in the Netherlands. This resulted in more uncertainty for the agricultural sector, which was responsible for 46% of the total deposition. Vedder participated in subsequent farmers' protests, ahead of which she spoke out against comments by member of parliament Tjeerd de Groot (D66) to halve the number of farm animals in order to solve the crisis. Vedder left her position at LTO Noord around that time due to her election to the Provincial Council of Drenthe, and she joined the board of LTO Nederland's dairy farming working group in September 2019. Due to her position, Vedder was involved in negotiations over an animal welfare covenant for the livestock sector. Minister of Agriculture, Nature and Food Quality Piet Adema had initiated the covenant between different stakeholders to circumvent the implementation of a stricter amendment that would require animals to show their natural behavior. Vedder left the working group upon her appointment to the House of Representatives in May 2023, and the covenant was still not completed as of 2023.

== Politics ==
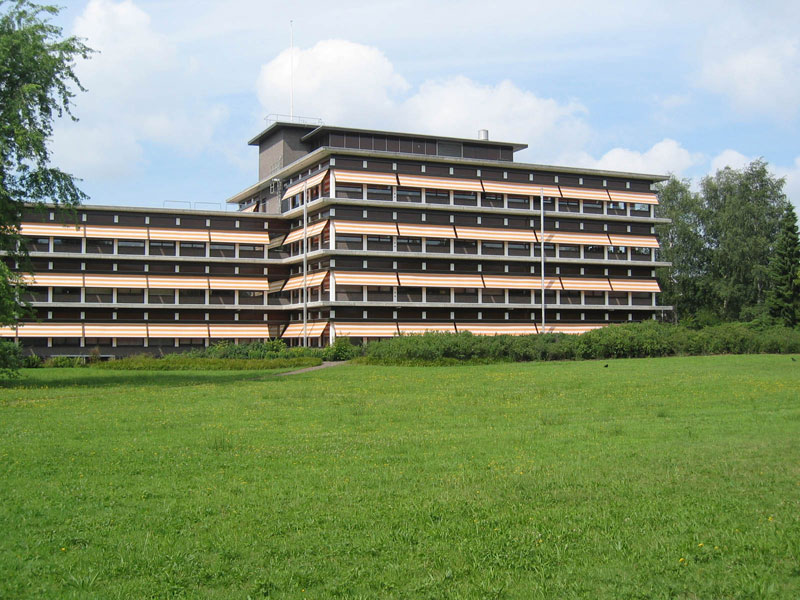
Seat of the Provincial Council of Drenthe

Vedder first ran for political office in the March 2018 municipal elections in her home municipality of De Wolden. She was placed third on the party list of the CDA and was elected to the council, as her party retained its three seats. A member of the third-biggest party in the eighteen-seat council, Vedder was sworn in on 29 March. She ran for the Provincial Council of Drenthe in March 2019 provincial elections as the CDA's 18th candidate. The party won five seats, compared to six in the previous election, and Vedder was elected due to her meeting of the preference vote threshold; 1,449 votes were cast for her. Vedder declared upon her election that she would be devoted to agriculture and that she believed the pressure on that sector was not always justified. She took her seat on 28 March and simultaneously left the municipal council. She served as her party's spokesperson for infrastructure, nature, tourism, and mining. In early 2020, Vedder joined calls that there should be a reverse burden of proof for damage to homes as a result of gas and salt extraction. This policy had earlier been enacted for the province of Groningen, where an oil and gas company has to prove damage is not the result of an induced earthquake to avoid having to pay compensation. Vedder was highlighted in an article of the newspaper NRC about provincial politicians voting on agricultural issues despite their positions at agricultural advocacy groups – LTO Nederland in her case. It noted this was in violation of the provincial council's code of conduct, although this was disputed by King's Commissioner of Drenthe Jetta Klijnsma.

Vedder ran for the House of Representatives in the March 2021 general election as the CDA's 23rd candidate. She was also on the committee that wrote the party's election program. During the campaign, Vedder opposed a meat tax and cuts in the livestock population, and she announced that she wanted to work on sustaining the earning capacity of the agricultural sector. The CDA's incumbent agricultural spokesperson in the House – Jaco Geurts – indicated his intention to hand over the subject to Vedder, and he encouraged people to vote for her. Vedder had been assisting Geurts as part of the CDA's agriculture expertise network since the start of her activism in 2017. The party lost four of its nineteen seats in the general election, and Vedder was not elected. She received the seventh highest vote total of the CDA candidates.

Vedder sought a second term in the provincial council in March 2023 elections as the CDA's third candidate. The CDA kept three of its five seats in Drenthe, leading to Vedder's re-election, amid national losses for the party and a major win for the new Farmer–Citizen Movement (BBB). It was announced on 20 April that Jaco Geurts would leave the House of Representatives to become acting mayor of Maasdriel. Vedder was appointed to succeed him as a result of her spot on the party list in the 2021 election, and she was sworn into the House on 10 May. She vacated her seat in the Provincial Council of Drenthe weeks after. In the House, she became the CDA's spokesperson for mining, gas extraction in Groningen, agriculture, fisheries, water, and environment. (Note: After only representing its greenhouse horticulture and animal welfare aspects, Vedder became the spokesperson for agriculture a few months after her swearing in.) Vedder was re-elected in November 2023 as the CDA's second candidate, and her specialties changed to agriculture, nature, food quality, infrastructure, water management, housing, spatial planning, and gas extraction from Groningen. Vedder introduced a motion urging the government to investigate how close to residential areas pest control can safely be conducted. It was adopted by the House, and agriculture minister Femke Wiersma announced that she would comply.

She did not run for re-election in 2025, and her term ended on 11 November 2025.

=== House committee assignments ===
==== 2023 term ====
- Committee for Agriculture, Nature and Food Quality
- Committee for Infrastructure and Water Management
- Committee for Kingdom Relations

==== 2023–2025 term ====
- Committee for Agriculture, Fisheries, Food Security and Nature
- Committee for Infrastructure and Water Management
- Committee for Housing and Spatial Planning

== Electoral history ==
Electoral history of Eline Vedder
Year	Body	Party	Pos.	Votes	Result		Ref.
Year	Body	Party	Pos.	Votes	Party seats	Individual	Ref.
2018	De Wolden Municipal Council	Christian Democratic Appeal	3		3	Won	
2019	Provincial Council of Drenthe	Christian Democratic Appeal	18	1,449	5	Won (Note: Vedder received enough preference votes to be elected despite her party's result.)	
2021	House of Representatives	Christian Democratic Appeal	23	9,377	15	Lost (Note: Vedder was appointed to the body later during the term due to a vacancy.)	
2022	De Wolden Municipal Council	Christian Democratic Appeal	20 (Note: Vedder participated as lijstduwer.)	32	3	Lost	
2023	Provincial Council of Drenthe	Christian Democratic Appeal	3	1,390	3	Won	
2023	House of Representatives	Christian Democratic Appeal	2	19,269	5	Won	
2026	De Wolden Municipal Council	Christian Democratic Appeal	20	42	3	Lost	
