= 2007 Dutch provincial elections =

Provincial elections were held in the Netherlands, on 7 March 2007. The election also determined the members of the Senate, since the 564 members of the twelve provincial councils elect its 75 members. This election took place on 29 May 2007.

== Background ==
Only a few weeks before the provincial elections, a new cabinet has been installed, the fourth Balkenende cabinet, consisting of the CDA, PvdA and CU. The provincial elections will be the first test for this new cabinet. Since the provincial councils elect the members of the Senate, it is possible that the CDA, PvdA and CU will not obtain a majority in the Senate. Since the members of the Senate can reject new laws, the outcome of the provincial elections can seriously hamper the strength of the new cabinet.

== National results ==
The Socialist Party (SP), Christian Union (CU) and Party for the Animals showed the largest gains, all continuing their successful spell from the 2006 general election. The CDA, PvdA, D66, the LPF and SGP showed the greatest losses, while the VVD and GroenLinks only suffered a marginal loss. The current government of CDA, PvdA and CU are expected to hold on to a majority in the Senate (elections to be held in May), with 41 out of the 75 seats. Geert Wilders had already announced in January 2007 that his Party for Freedom would not take part in the elections, since it had not succeeded to be able to participate in all provinces. One important factor in comparing the 2003 and 2007 results is the fact that the number of members of each provincial legislature was lowered, from a maximum 73 to a maximum 55.

Provincial councils
Party	Seats			
Party	2003	2003 (Note: Recalculated)	2007	+/–
Christian Democratic Appeal	222	169	151	–18
Labour Party	198	150	114	–36
People's Party for Freedom and Democracy	138	103	102	–1
Socialist Party	38	29	83	+54
Christian Union	26	19	35	+16
GroenLinks	51	37	32	–5
Reformed Political Party	19	13	13	0
Democrats 66	31	20	9	–11
Party for the Animals	0	0	9	+9
Pim Fortuyn List	17	10	0	–10
Christian Union – Reformed Political Party	5	4	3	–1
Regionalist parties	19	10	13	+3
Total	764	564	564	0

== Results by province ==
=== Drenthe ===
Party	Votes	%	Seats
Labour Party	51,875	27.20	13
Christian Democratic Appeal	40,472	21.22	10
People's Party for Freedom and Democracy	31,954	16.75	8
Socialist Party	23,397	12.27	5
Christian Union	14,427	7.56	3
GroenLinks	9,004	4.72	2
Other parties	19,598	10.28	0
Total	190,727	100.00	41
Valid votes	190,727	99.73	
Invalid/blank votes	521	0.27	
Total votes	191,248	100.00	
Registered voters/turnout	373,834	51.16	
Source: Kiesraad

=== Flevoland ===
Party	Votes	%	Seats
People's Party for Freedom and Democracy	25,996	22.75	9
Christian Democratic Appeal	21,652	18.95	8
Labour Party	19,421	17.00	7
Socialist Party	16,023	14.02	6
Christian Union	12,740	11.15	5
GroenLinks	6,330	5.54	2
Reformed Political Party	4,030	3.53	1
Party for the Animals	3,687	3.23	1
Other parties	4,388	3.84	0
Total	114,267	100.00	39
Valid votes	114,267	99.50	
Invalid/blank votes	573	0.50	
Total votes	114,840	100.00	
Registered voters/turnout	261,919	43.85	
Source: Kiesraad

=== Friesland ===
Party	Votes	%	Seats
Christian Democratic Appeal	68,041	25.75	12
Labour Party	67,712	25.62	12
People's Party for Freedom and Democracy	28,574	10.81	5
Frisian National Party	28,225	10.68	5
Socialist Party	25,281	9.57	4
Christian Union	21,638	8.19	3
GroenLinks	10,269	3.89	2
Other parties	14,529	5.50	0
Total	264,269	100.00	43
Valid votes	264,269	99.74	
Invalid/blank votes	685	0.26	
Total votes	264,954	100.00	
Registered voters/turnout	489,389	54.14	
Source: Kiesraad

=== Gelderland ===
Party	Votes	%	Seats
Christian Democratic Appeal	195,375	26.85	15
Labour Party	124,651	17.13	10
People's Party for Freedom and Democracy	121,003	16.63	9
Socialist Party	100,295	13.78	7
Christian Union	58,917	8.10	4
GroenLinks	42,539	5.85	3
Reformed Political Party	35,630	4.90	3
Democrats 66	16,855	2.32	1
Party for the Animals	15,638	2.15	1
Other parties	16,734	2.30	0
Total	727,637	100.00	53
Valid votes	727,637	99.70	
Invalid/blank votes	2,224	0.30	
Total votes	729,861	100.00	
Registered voters/turnout	1,491,820	48.92	
Source: Kiesraad

=== Groningen ===
Party	Votes	%	Seats
Labour Party	59,630	26.21	12
Christian Democratic Appeal	44,091	19.38	9
Socialist Party	36,203	15.91	7
People's Party for Freedom and Democracy	26,593	11.69	5
Christian Union	23,352	10.26	4
GroenLinks	17,323	7.61	3
Party for the North	8,276	3.64	1
Democrats 66	5,915	2.60	1
Party for the Animals	4,913	2.16	1
Other parties	1,230	0.54	0
Total	227,526	100.00	43
Valid votes	227,526	99.70	
Invalid/blank votes	679	0.30	
Total votes	228,205	100.00	
Registered voters/turnout	447,392	51.01	
Source: Kiesraad

=== Limburg ===
Party	Votes	%	Seats
Christian Democratic Appeal	133,722	35.35	18
Socialist Party	70,267	18.58	9
Labour Party	60,109	15.89	8
People's Party for Freedom and Democracy	54,656	14.45	7
GroenLinks	16,054	4.24	2
Party New Limburg	14,232	3.76	1
Party for the Animals	9,717	2.57	1
Democrats 66	8,576	2.27	1
Other parties	10,918	2.89	0
Total	378,251	100.00	47
Valid votes	378,251	99.50	
Invalid/blank votes	1,911	0.50	
Total votes	380,162	100.00	
Registered voters/turnout	865,571	43.92	
Source: Kiesraad

=== North Brabant ===
Party	Votes	%	Seats
Christian Democratic Appeal	239,296	31.25	18
Socialist Party	160,583	20.97	12
People's Party for Freedom and Democracy	144,580	18.88	11
Labour Party	108,048	14.11	8
GroenLinks	31,611	4.13	2
Christian Union – Reformed Political Party	20,825	2.72	1
Party for the Animals	16,595	2.17	1
Democrats 66	15,998	2.09	1
Brabantian Party	14,576	1.90	1
Other parties	13,598	1.78	0
Total	765,710	100.00	55
Valid votes	765,710	99.58	
Invalid/blank votes	3,219	0.42	
Total votes	768,929	100.00	
Registered voters/turnout	1,828,020	42.06	
Source: Kiesraad

=== North Holland ===
Party	Votes	%	Seats
People's Party for Freedom and Democracy	196,566	22.73	13
Labour Party	167,089	19.32	11
Christian Democratic Appeal	152,820	17.67	10
Socialist Party	135,996	15.73	9
GroenLinks	83,718	9.68	5
Democrats 66	32,775	3.79	2
Party for the Animals	32,330	3.74	2
Christian Union – Reformed Political Party	28,998	3.35	2
Elderly Party NH/VSP	27,545	3.19	1
Other parties	6,840	0.79	0
Total	864,677	100.00	55
Valid votes	864,677	99.48	
Invalid/blank votes	4,482	0.52	
Total votes	869,159	100.00	
Registered voters/turnout	1,929,881	45.04	
Source: Kiesraad

=== Overijssel ===
Party	Votes	%	Seats
Christian Democratic Appeal	141,320	34.05	17
Labour Party	74,170	17.87	9
People's Party for Freedom and Democracy	56,315	13.57	6
Socialist Party	48,777	11.75	6
Christian Union	42,992	10.36	5
GroenLinks	17,851	4.30	2
Reformed Political Party	14,446	3.48	2
Other parties	19,181	4.62	0
Total	415,052	100.00	47
Valid votes	415,052	99.70	
Invalid/blank votes	1,241	0.30	
Total votes	416,293	100.00	
Registered voters/turnout	834,531	49.88	
Source: Kiesraad

=== South Holland ===
Party	Votes	%	Seats
Christian Democratic Appeal	240,021	21.51	13
People's Party for Freedom and Democracy	226,408	20.29	12
Labour Party	189,907	17.02	10
Socialist Party	151,015	13.54	8
Christian Union	77,153	6.92	4
GroenLinks	65,684	5.89	3
Reformed Political Party	48,265	4.33	2
Party for the Animals	34,448	3.09	1
Livable South Holland	33,333	2.99	1
Democrats 66	28,926	2.59	1
Other parties	20,512	1.84	0
Total	1,115,672	100.00	55
Valid votes	1,115,672	99.46	
Invalid/blank votes	6,070	0.54	
Total votes	1,121,742	100.00	
Registered voters/turnout	2,546,871	44.04	
Source: Kiesraad

=== Utrecht ===
Party	Votes	%	Seats
Christian Democratic Appeal	98,900	22.41	11
People's Party for Freedom and Democracy	88,722	20.11	10
Labour Party	69,823	15.82	8
Socialist Party	51,709	11.72	5
GroenLinks	39,923	9.05	4
Christian Union	39,158	8.87	4
Democrats 66	17,764	4.03	2
Reformed Political Party	14,291	3.24	1
Party for the Animals	11,753	2.66	1
Beautiful Utrecht	9,219	2.09	1
Total	441,262	100.00	47
Valid votes	441,262	99.58	
Invalid/blank votes	1,846	0.42	
Total votes	443,108	100.00	
Registered voters/turnout	884,253	50.11	
Source: Kiesraad

=== Zeeland ===
Party	Votes	%	Seats
Christian Democratic Appeal	37,146	24.70	10
People's Party for Freedom and Democracy	21,822	14.51	6
Labour Party	21,351	14.19	6
Socialist Party	18,727	12.45	5
Reformed Political Party	17,654	11.74	5
Christian Union	12,040	8.00	3
Party for Zeeland	10,402	6.92	2
GroenLinks	7,403	4.92	2
Other parties	3,869	2.57	0
Total	150,414	100.00	39
Valid votes	150,414	99.70	
Invalid/blank votes	449	0.30	
Total votes	150,863	100.00	
Registered voters/turnout	285,333	52.87	
Source: Kiesraad
