= 2015 Dutch provincial elections =

Provincial elections were held in the Netherlands on Wednesday 18 March 2015. Eligible voters elected the members of the States-Provincial in the twelve provinces. These elections also indirectly determined the members of the Senate, since the 566 members of the twelve States-Provincial will elect the Senate's 75 members in the Senate election on 26 May 2015. These provincial election were held on the same day as the 2015 Dutch water boards elections.

== Participating parties ==
Eight political parties participated in the elections in all of the country's twelve provinces:

- Christian Democratic Appeal (CDA)
- Democrats 66 (D66)
- GreenLeft (GL)
- Labour Party (PvdA)
- Party for Freedom (PVV)
- 50PLUS
- Socialist Party (SP)
- People's Party for Freedom and Democracy (VVD)

== Opinion polls ==
In the table below the % of voters based on various polls.

Date	Polling Firm	VVD	PvdA	CDA	PVV	SP	D66	GL	CU	50PLUS	SGP	PvdD	Others	Lead
7 Feb 2015	I&O Research	17	12	13	13	14	13	5	4	4	3	3	0	3
1 Feb 2015	Peil	14	9	15	14	12	16	7	4	1	2	3	2	1
2 Mar 2011	Last elections	20	17	14	12	10	8	6	3	2	2	2	2	3

== Seats summary ==
Legislatures and governments of the Provinces of the Netherlands, 2015–2019
States-Provincial														Provincial Executive
Province	VVD	CDA	D66	PVV	SP	PvdA	GL	CU	SGP	PvdD	50+	Provincial parties	Total	Provincial Executive
Groningen	4	5	4	3	8	6	3	4		2	0	4: GB 3; PvhN 1	43	SP, D66, CDA, GL, CU
Friesland	5	9	3	4	5	7	1	3		1	1	5: FNP 5	43	CDA, VVD, FNP, SP
Drenthe	7	6	4	5	5	7	2	3	0		1	1: SL 1	41	VVD, PvdA, CDA, CU
Overijssel	6	11	5	5	5	5	2	4	2	1	1	0	47	CDA, VVD, D66, CU
Flevoland	7	5	4	6	5	3	2	3	2	2	2	0	41	VVD, CDA, D66, SP
Gelderland	9	9	7	5	6	6	3	4	3	2	1	0	55	VVD, CDA, D66, PvdA
Utrecht	9	6	9	4	4	5	4	3	2	2	1	0	49	VVD, CDA, D66, GL
North Holland	11	5	6	10	6	7	4	1		3	1	1: ONH 1	55	VVD, D66, PvdA, CDA
South Holland	10	7	7	8	5	5	3	3	3	2	2	0	55	VVD, CDA, SP, D66
Zeeland	6	6	3	4	4	4	1	2	6		1	2: ZL 1; PvZ 1	39	VVD, PvdA, CDA, SGP
North Brabant	10	9	7	7	9	4	3	1		2	2	1: LB 1	55	VVD, SP, D66, PvdA
Limburg	5	11	4	9	8	4	2			1	1	2: VL 1; LL 1	47	VVD, CDA, SP, D66, PvdA
Total	89	89	67	66	70	63	30	29	18	18	14	15	570	
Total	89	89	67	66	70	63	30	2		18	14	15	570	

== Results ==
=== National ===
Biggest party by province

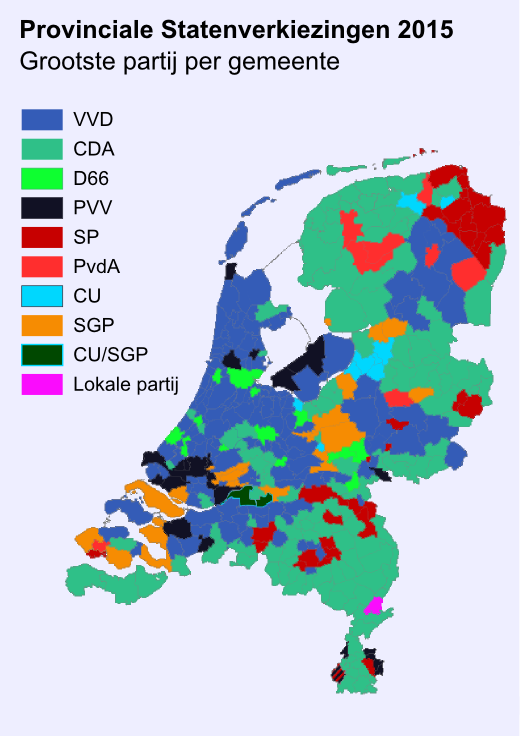
Biggest party by municipality

The table below shows the total number of seats in all provinces. On March 23, the official results of the 2015 election were published. The two parties which lost most seats were PvdA and VVD, the parties in the national government at the time of the election.

Party	Votes	%	Seats
People's Party for Freedom and Democracy	965,353	15.92	89
Christian Democratic Appeal	891,845	14.71	89
Democrats 66	755,719	12.46	67
Party for Freedom	711,176	11.73	66
Socialist Party	706,440	11.65	70
Labour Party	611,262	10.08	63
GroenLinks	324,572	5.35	30
Christian Union	243,209	4.01	29
Party for the Animals	210,113	3.46	18
50PLUS	204,858	3.38	14
Reformed Political Party	170,624	2.81	18
Christian Union – Reformed Political Party	42,703	0.70	2
Frisian National Party	25,027	0.41	4
Ouderenpartij Noord-Holland	19,763	0.33	1
Groninger Belang	15,869	0.26	3
Lokaal Brabant	15,226	0.25	1
Hart voor Holland	13,452	0.22	0
Pirate Party	9,885	0.16	0
Volkspartij Limburg	9,296	0.15	1
Lokaal-Limburg	8,741	0.14	1
Lokaal Overijssel	7,817	0.13	0
Sterk Lokaal	7,057	0.12	1
Nederland Lokaal	7,026	0.12	0
Lokaal Belang Gelderland–1 Achterhoek	6,967	0.11	0
Lokale Partijen Gelderland	6,474	0.11	0
Verenigde Lokale Partijen Zuid-Holland	6,097	0.10	0
Zeeland Lokaal	5,815	0.10	1
Party for Zeeland	5,787	0.10	1
Vrouwen Partij	5,595	0.09	0
Party for the North	5,173	0.09	1
Libertarian Party	4,661	0.08	0
Multicultureel Plus Partij	4,222	0.07	0
Provincie@Inwonersbelangen	3,881	0.06	0
Senioren Belang Noord	3,510	0.06	0
Jesus Lives	3,444	0.06	0
Partij voor Mens en Spirit	3,309	0.05	0
Seniorenpartij Groningen	2,462	0.04	0
Provinciaal Belang Zeeland	2,388	0.04	0
PSP'92 Gelderland	2,348	0.04	0
Groningen Centraal!	2,182	0.04	0
Vrijzinnige Partij	2,098	0.03	0
Grunnegers veur Stad en Ommelaand	1,498	0.02	0
Vrede en Recht	1,337	0.02	0
United Communist Party	1,238	0.02	0
Partij voor Leefbaarheid en Democratie	1,218	0.02	0
Libertarische Partij	1,008	0.02	0
Friese Koers	1,001	0.02	0
OPA	982	0.02	0
Platform Vrije Politiek	836	0.01	0
StemNL	648	0.01	0
Gelderse Centrumdemocraten	456	0.01	0
Red het Noorden	405	0.01	0
Verenigd Links-Feriene Lofts	347	0.01	0
Vrij Mandaat	334	0.01	0
Total	6,064,754	100.00	570
Valid votes	6,064,754	99.38	
Invalid/blank votes	37,681	0.62	
Total votes	6,102,435	100.00	
Registered voters/turnout	12,777,145	47.76	
Source: Kiesraad

=== By province ===
Province	SP	PvdA	PvdD	GL	D66	50+	VVD	CDA	CU	SGP	PVV	Provincial parties
Groningen	8	6	2	3	4	0	4	5	4		3	4: GB 3; PvhN 1
Friesland	5	7	1	1	3	1	5	9	3		4	5: FNP 5
Drenthe	5	7		2	4	1	7	6	3	0	5	1: SL 1
Overijssel	5	5	1	2	5	1	6	11	4	2	5	0
Flevoland	5	3	2	2	4	2	7	5	3	2	6	0
Gelderland	6	6	2	3	7	1	9	9	4	3	5	0
Utrecht	4	5	2	4	9	1	9	6	3	2	4	0
North Holland	6	7	3	4	10	1	11	5	1		6	1: ONH 1
South Holland	5	5	2	3	7	2	10	7	3	3	8	0
Zeeland	4	4		1	3	1	6	6	2	6	4	2: ZL 1; PvZ 1
North Brabant	9	4	2	3	7	2	10	9	1		7	1: LB 1
Limburg	8	4	1	2	4	1	5	11			9	2: VL 1; LL 1

== Island council elections ==
Political party	2011	2015	change
Bonaire island council
Union Patriotiko Boneriano (UPB)	4	3	−1
Partido Demokratiko Boneriano (PDB)	3	3	–
Partido Pro Hustisia & Union (PHU)	1	0	−1
Movementu Boneiru Liber (MBL)	1	0	−1
Movementu di Pueblo Boneriano (MPB)	–	3	+3
total	9	9	
turnout	75%	78%	+3%
Saba island council
Windward Islands People's Movement (WIPM)	4	3	−1
Saba Labour Party (SLP)	1	2	+1
total	5	5	
turnout	88%	91,3%	+3,1%
Sint Eustatius island council
Democratische Partij (DP)	2	2	–
Progressive Labour Party (PLP)	1	2	+1
United People’s Coalition (UPC)	1	1	–
St. Eustatius Empowerment Party (STEP)	1	0	−1
Blanco Lijst (Lijst-Schmidt)	–	0	–
Statia Liberal Action Movement (SLAM)	–	0	–
total	5	5	
turnout	68%	65,5%	−2,5%
