= 2019 Dutch provincial elections =

Map showing the largest party by province

Provincial elections were held in the Netherlands on 20 March 2019. Eligible voters elected the members of the Provincial States in the twelve provinces of the Netherlands. The elections were held on the same day as the 2019 Dutch water boards elections and, in the Caribbean Netherlands, island council elections.

These elections also indirectly determine the composition of the Senate, since the members of the twelve provincial states, alongside electoral colleges elected in the Caribbean Netherlands on the same day, will elect the Senate's 75 members in the Senate election on 27 May, two months after the provincial elections. Because of this, the provincial elections were a test for the third Rutte cabinet, which previously had a majority of one seat in the Senate, but has since lost that majority.

The outcome of the election is considered a historical upset, with the right-wing populist Forum for Democracy securing more than 15% of the national vote. Some analysts have described the election as a prelude to the 2023 provincial elections, which were won by an ever larger landslide of 19% by the right-wing populist BBB.

== Seats summary ==
Legislatures and governments of the Provinces of the Netherlands, 2019–2023
States-Provincial																Provincial Executive
Province	VVD	CDA	D66	PVV	SP	PvdA	GL	CU	SGP	PvdD	50+	DENK	FVD	Provincial parties	Total	Provincial Executive
Groningen	4	3	3	2	4	5	6	4		1	1		5	5: GB 3; PvhN 2	43	GL, PvdA, CU, VVD, CDA, D66
Friesland	4	8	2	3	2	6	3	3		1	1		6	4: FNP 4	43	CDA, PvdA, VVD, FNP
Drenthe	6	5	2	3	3	6	4	3		1	1		6	1: SL 1	41	PvdA, VVD, CDA, GL, CU
Overijssel	6	9	3	3	3	4	5	4	2	1	1		6		47	CDA, VVD, PvdA, CU, SGP
Flevoland	6	3	2	4	2	3	4	3	1	2	2	1	8 (Note: The party came in front, but is not part of the executive, thus the cell isn't highlighted.)		41	VVD, GL, CDA, PvdA, CU, D66
Gelderland	8	7	4	3	3	5	6	4	3	2	2		8		55	VVD, CDA, GL, PvdA, CU
Utrecht	8	5	5	2	2	4	8	4	1	2	1	1	6		49	GL, CDA, D66, PvdA, CU
North Holland	9	4	6	3	3	6	9	1		3	1 (Note: Combined list 50+/Party of the Elderly)	1	9		55	GL, VVD, PvdA, D66
South Holland	10	4	5	4	2	4	5	3	2	2	2	1	11		55	VVD, CU-SGP, GL, PvdA, CDA
Zeeland	4	7	1	2	2	4	2	2	5	1	2		5	2: PvZ 2	39	CDA, SGP, VVD, PvdA
North Brabant	10	8	5	4	5	3	5	1		2	2		9	1: LB 1	55	VVD, FvD, CDA, LB
Limburg	5	9	3	7	4	3	4			2	1		7	2: L-L 2	47	CDA, FvD, PVV, VVD, GL, LL (Note: The Provincial-Executive of Limburg is a technocratic government made up of non-members.)
Total	80	72	41	40	35	53	61	31	14	20	17	4	86	15	570	
Total	80	72	41	40	35	53	61	1		20	17	4	86	15	570	
Executives (out of 12)	10	10	4	0	0	10	7	7	3	0	0	0	1	2		

== Detailed results ==
=== National ===
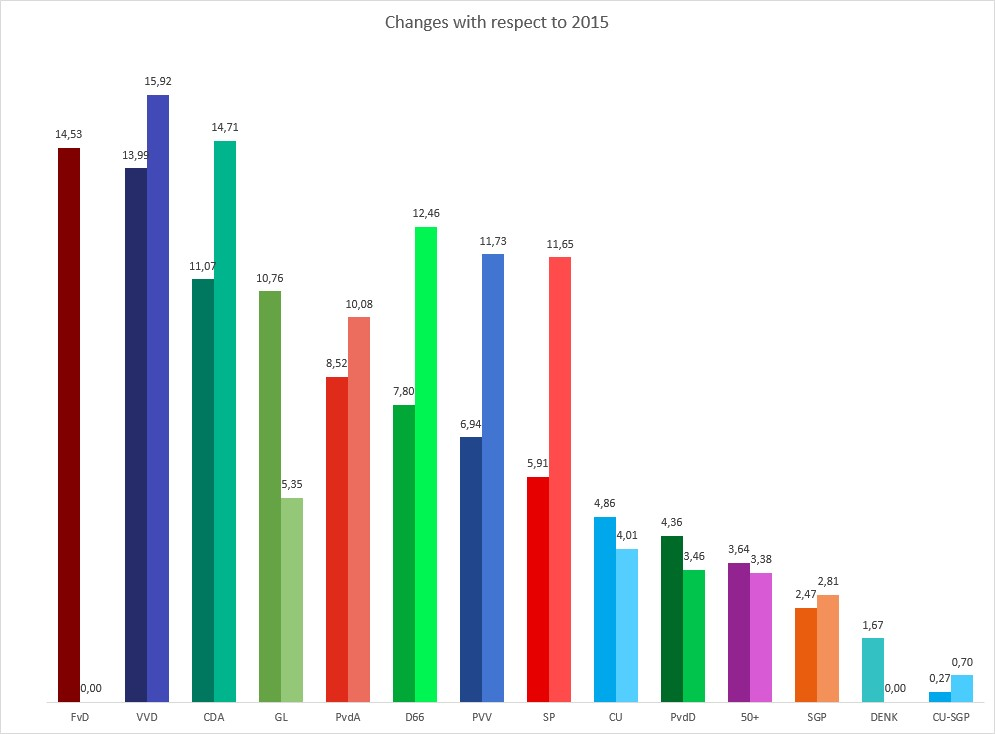
2019 Dutch provincial elections changes with respect to 2015

Party or alliance		Votes	%	+/–	Seats	+/–
Forum for Democracy		1,057,030	14.53	New	86	New
People's Party for Freedom and Democracy		1,017,937	13.99	-1.93	80	–9
Christian Democratic Appeal		805,862	11.07	-3.64	72	–17
GroenLinks		783,006	10.76	+5.41	61	+31
Labour Party		619,906	8.52	-1.56	53	–10
Democrats 66		567,363	7.80	-4.66	41	–26
Party for Freedom		504,948	6.94	-4.79	40	–26
Socialist Party		430,096	5.91	-5.74	35	–35
CU–SGP	Christian Union	353,443	4.86	+0.85	31	+2
CU–SGP	Reformed Political Party	179,899	2.47	-0.34	14	–4
CU–SGP	CU–SGP joint list in North Brabant	19,466	0.27	-0.43	1	–1
CU–SGP	Total	552,808	7.60	+0.01	46	–3
Party for the Animals		317,104	4.36	+0.90	20	+2
50PLUS		265,215	3.64	+0.26	17	+3
Independent Senate Group	Local Brabant	25,485	0.35	+0.10	1	0
Independent Senate Group	Frisian National Party	23,662	0.33	-0.08	4	0
Independent Senate Group	Groningers' Interests	18,556	0.25	-0.01	3	0
Independent Senate Group	Local Limburg	18,474	0.25	+0.11	2	+1
Independent Senate Group	Elderly Party North Holland	18,307	0.25	-0.08	0	–1
Independent Senate Group	Local Parties South Holland	11,648	0.16	New	0	New
Independent Senate Group	Local Parties Gelderland – Code Orange	11,053	0.15	New	0	New
Independent Senate Group	Party for Zeeland	10,619	0.15	+0.05	2	+1
Independent Senate Group	Strong Local	9,344	0.13	+0.01	1	0
Independent Senate Group	U26 Municipalities	6,530	0.09	New	0	New
Independent Senate Group	Frisian Provincial Interests	5,345	0.07	New	0	New
Independent Senate Group	Total	159,023	2.19	–	13	+1
Denk		121,753	1.67	New	4	New
Code Orange		24,047	0.33	New	0	New
NIDA		11,347	0.16	New	0	New
Party for the North		10,527	0.14	+0.05	2	+1
Seniors Brabant		9,687	0.13	New	0	New
Elderly Appeal - Heart for Brabant		6,719	0.09	New	0	New
Independent Party Drenthe		3,777	0.05	New	0	New
Natural Frisian		2,917	0.04	New	0	New
Jesus Lives		2,323	0.03	-0.03	0	0
Senior Interests		1,414	0.02	-0.04	0	0
Politically Active Elders		1,283	0.02	±0.00	0	0
Respect!		976	0.01	New	0	New
Total		7,277,068	100.00	–	570	–
Valid votes		7,277,068	99.42			
Invalid votes		21,205	0.29			
Blank votes		21,377	0.29			
Total votes		7,319,650	100.00			
Registered voters/turnout		13,032,532	56.16	+8.40		
Source: Kiesraad

=== By province ===
==== Drenthe ====
Party	Votes	%	+/–	Seats	+/–
Labour Party	32,105	14.06	–1.09	6	–1
Forum for Democracy	30,713	13.45	New	6	New
People's Party for Freedom and Democracy	29,785	13.05	–2.17	6	–1
Christian Democratic Appeal	24,082	10.55	–3.88	5	–1
GroenLinks	18,954	8.30	+3.13	4	+2
Party for Freedom	16,097	7.05	–3.83	3	–2
Christian Union	15,526	6.80	+0.37	3	0
Socialist Party	14,760	6.47	–6.10	3	–2
Democrats 66	12,995	5.69	–4.16	2	–2
Locally Strong	9,344	4.09	+0.45	1	0
50PLUS	8,444	3.70	–0.33	1	0
Party for the Animals	7,823	3.43	New	1	New
Independent Party Drenthe	3,777	1.65	New	0	New
Reformed Political Party	1,877	0.82	–0.02	0	0
Senior Interests	1,414	0.62	New	0	New
DENK	579	0.25	New	0	New
Total	228,275	100.00	–	41	–
Valid votes	228,275	99.55			
Invalid/blank votes	1,026	0.45			
Total votes	229,301	100.00			
Registered voters/turnout	389,925	58.81			
Source: Kiesraad

==== Flevoland ====
Party	Votes	%	+/–	Seats	+/–
Forum for Democracy	28,376	17.79	New	8	New
People's Party for Freedom and Democracy	21,012	13.17	–3.49	6	–1
Party for Freedom	14,781	9.27	–5.14	4	–2
GroenLinks	13,608	8.53	+4.13	–	–
Christian Democratic Appeal	13,256	8.31	–4.49	3	–2
Labour Party	13,090	8.21	+0.47	3	0
Christian Union	11,219	7.03	+0.24	3	0
Socialist Party	9,291	5.83	–5.08	2	–3
50PLUS	7,859	4.93	–0.23	2	0
Democrats 66	7,799	4.89	–5.66	2	–2
Party for the Animals	6,986	4.38	+0.25	2	0
Reformed Political Party	6,128	3.84	–0.12	1	–1
DENK	3,326	2.09	New	1	New
Politically Active Elders	1,283	0.80	+0.05	0	0
Respect!	976	0.61	New	0	New
Jesus Lives	495	0.31	0.00	0	0
Total	159,485	100.00	–	37	–
Valid votes	159,485	99.35			
Invalid/blank votes	1,038	0.65			
Total votes	160,523	100.00			
Registered voters/turnout	299,536	53.59			
Source: Kiesraad

==== Friesland ====
Party	Votes	%	+/–	Seats	+/–
Christian Democratic Appeal	49,704	16.67	–4.12	8	–1
Forum for Democracy	40,055	13.43	New	6	New
Labour Party	39,976	13.40	–2.09	6	–1
People's Party for Freedom and Democracy	28,073	9.41	–1.58	4	–1
Frisian National Party	23,662	7.93	–1.53	4	0
GroenLinks	22,935	7.69	+4.14	3	+2
Christian Union	19,673	6.60	–0.83	3	0
Party for Freedom	17,287	5.80	–2.93	3	–1
Socialist Party	15,426	5.17	–5.76	2	–3
Democrats 66	12,284	4.12	–2.85	2	–1
Party for the Animals	9,618	3.22	+0.65	1	0
50PLUS	7,595	2.55	+0.14	1	0
Frisian Provincial Interests	5,345	1.79	New	0	New
Reformed Political Party	3,198	1.07	New	0	New
Natural Frisian	2,917	0.98	New	0	New
DENK	493	0.17	New	0	New
Total	298,241	100.00	–	43	–
Valid votes	298,241	99.52			
Invalid/blank votes	1,428	0.48			
Total votes	299,669	100.00			
Registered voters/turnout	506,868	59.12			
Source: Kiesraad

==== Gelderland ====
Party	Votes	%	+/–	Seats	+/–
People's Party for Freedom and Democracy	130,537	13.96	–1.83	8	–1
Forum for Democracy	125,551	13.43	New	8	New
Christian Democratic Appeal	108,248	11.58	–3.42	7	–2
GroenLinks	101,231	10.83	+5.12	6	+3
Labour Party	77,931	8.33	–0.71	5	–1
Democrats 66	67,279	7.20	–5.42	4	–3
Christian Union	63,364	6.78	+0.66	4	0
Party for Freedom	56,633	6.06	–3.66	3	–2
Socialist Party	54,510	5.83	–5.17	3	–3
Reformed Political Party	49,097	5.25	–0.73	3	0
Party for the Animals	41,658	4.46	+1.12	2	0
50PLUS	35,607	3.81	+0.94	2	+1
DENK	11,298	1.21	New	0	New
Local Parties Gelderland – Code Oranje	11,053	1.18	New	0	New
Jesus Lives	1,072	0.11	New	0	New
Total	935,069	100.00	–	55	–
Valid votes	935,069	99.46			
Invalid/blank votes	5,040	0.54			
Total votes	940,109	100.00			
Registered voters/turnout	1,605,669	58.55			
Source: Kiesraad

==== Groningen ====
Party	Popular vote			Seats	
Party	Votes	%	±pp	Total	+/−
GreenLeft	31,886	12.49		6	+3
Labour Party	30,605	11.99		5	–1
Forum for Democracy	26,104	10.22	New	5	+5
Christian Union	24,125	9.45		4	±0
Socialist Party	22,166	8.68		4	–4
People's Party for Freedom and Democracy	21,595	8.49		4	±0
Christian Democratic Appeal	20,642	8.08		3	–2
Groningers' Interests	18,556	7.27		3	±0
Democrats 66	16,727	6.55		3	–1
Party for Freedom	15,271	5.98		2	–1
Party for the North	10,527	4.12		2	+1
Party for the Animals	10,406	4.08		1	–1
50PLUS	5,638	2.21		1	+1
Denk	1,081	0.42	New	0	±0
Total Valid votes	255,329			43	±0
Blank votes	744	0.29			
Invalid votes	583	0.23			
Votes cast / turnout	256,656	56.07			
Registered voters	457,753				

==== Limburg ====
Party	Popular vote			Seats	
Party	Votes	%	±pp	Total	+/−
Christian Democratic Appeal	84,947	18.65		9	–2
Forum for Democracy	66,343	14.57	New	7	+7
Party for Freedom	61,705	13.55		7	–2
People's Party for Freedom and Democracy	46,254	10.16		5	±0
Socialist Party	39,527	8.68		4	–4
GreenLeft	38,291	8.41		4	+2
Labour Party	29,724	6.53		3	–1
Democrats 66	26,420	5.80		3	–1
Local Limburg	18,474	4.06		2	+1
Party for the Animals	17,512	3.84		2	+1
50PLUS	17,104	3.76		1	±0
Christian Union	4,855	1.07	New	0	±0
Denk	4,322	0.95	New	0	±0
Total Valid votes	455,478			47	±0
Blank votes	1,732	0.38			
Invalid votes	1,289	0.28			
Votes cast / turnout	458,499	52.57			
Registered voters	872,100				

==== North Brabant ====
Party	Popular vote			Seats	
Party	Votes	%	±pp	Total	+/−
People's Party for Freedom and Democracy	163,906	16.18		10	±0
Forum for Democracy	146,443	14.45	New	9	+9
Christian Democratic Appeal	134,834	13.31		8	–1
Socialist Party	93,138	9.19		5	–4
Democrats 66	89,014	8.78		5	–2
GreenLeft	87,687	8.65		5	+2
Party for Freedom	77,453	7.64		4	–3
Labour Party	64,837	6.40		3	–1
50PLUS	41,612	4.11		2	±0
Party for the Animals	37,775	3.73		2	±0
Local Brabant	25,485	2.52		1	±0
Christian Union – Reformed Political Party	19,466	1.92		1	±0
Denk	12,415	1.23	New	0	±0
Seniors Brabant	9,687	0.96	New	0	±0
Elderly Appeal - Heart for Brabant	6,719	0.66	New	0	±0
Code Orange	2,784	0.27	New	0	±0
Total of Valid votes	1,013,255			55	±0
Blank votes	3,593	0.35			
Invalid votes	2,738	0.27			
Total votes cast / turnout	1,019,586				
Registered voters	1,945,875				

==== North Holland ====
Party	Popular vote			Seats	
Party	Votes	%	±pp	Total	+/−
Forum for Democracy	178,717	15.33	New	9	+9
GroenLinks	178,001	15.26		9	+5
People's Party for Freedom and Democracy	169,288	14.52		9	–2
Democrats 66	115,928	9.94		6	–4
Labour Party	114,026	9.78		6	–1
Christian Democratic Appeal	79,361	6.81		4	–1
Party for the Animals	70,809	6.07		3	±0
Party for Freedom	65,346	5.60		3	–3
Socialist Party	58,396	5.01		3	–3
Christian Union	36,491	3.13		1	+1
50PLUS / Party of the Elderly	32,190	2.76		1	+1
Denk	28,035	2.40	New	1	+1
Elderly Party North Holland	18,307	1.57		0	–1
Code Oranje	16,665	1.43	New	0	±0
NIDA	4,615	0.40	New	0	±0
Total Valid votes	1,166,175			55	±0
Blank votes	3,199	0.27			
Invalid votes	3,953	0.34			
Votes cast / turnout	1,173,327	56.34			
Registered voters	2,082,562				

==== Overijssel ====
Party	Popular vote			Seats	
Party	Votes	%	±pp	Total	+/−
Christian Democratic Appeal	89,523	17.10		9	–2
Forum for Democracy	69,443	13.27	New	6	+6
People's Party for Freedom and Democracy	67,731	12.94		6	±0
GreenLeft	49,643	9.48		5	+3
Labour Party	44,494	8.50		4	–1
Christian Union	43,248	8.26		4	±0
Party for Freedom	37,582	7.18		3	–2
Socialist Party	30,792	5.88		3	–2
Democrats 66	30,221	5.77		3	–2
Reformed Political Party	20,473	3.91		2	±0
50PLUS	17,970	3.43		1	±0
Party for the Animals	15,850	3.03		1	±0
Denk	6,495	1.24	New	0	±0
Total Valid votes	523,465			47	±0
Blank votes	1,408	0.27			
Invalid votes	1,335	0.25			
Votes cast / turnout	526,208	59.27			
Registered voters	887,844				

==== South Holland ====
Party	Popular vote			Seats	
Party	Votes	%	±pp	Total	+/−
Forum for Democracy	253,743	17.43	New	11	+11
People's Party for Freedom and Democracy	227,987	15.66		10	±0
GreenLeft	131,878	9.06		5	+2
Democrats 66	124,154	8.53		5	–2
Labour Party	113,859	7.82		4	–1
Christian Democratic Appeal	112,681	7.74		4	–3
Party for Freedom	101,858	7.00		4	–4
Christian Union	81,160	5.57		3	±0
50PLUS	64,727	4.45		2	±0
Party for the Animals	63,690	4.37		2	±0
Socialist Party	59,956	4.12		2	–3
Reformed Political Party	56,742	3.90		2	–1
Denk	39,800	2.73	New	1	+1
Local Parties South Holland	11,648	0.80	New	0	±0
NIDA	6,732	0.46	New	0	±0
Code Oranje	4,598	0.32	New	0	±0
Jesus Lives	756	0.05		0	±0
Total Valid votes	1,455,969			55	±0
Blank votes	4,102	0.28			
Invalid votes	5,225	0.36			
Votes cast / turnout	1,465,296	54.49			
Registered voters	2,689,094				

==== Utrecht ====
Party	Popular vote			Seats	
Party	Votes	%	±pp	Total	+/−
GreenLeft	98,900	16.07		8	+4
People's Party for Freedom and Democracy	94,189	15.31		8	–1
Forum for Democracy	71,374	11.60	New	6	+6
Christian Democratic Appeal	60,774	9.88		5	–1
Democrats 66	58,133	9.45		5	–4
Labour Party	44,894	7.30		4	–1
Christian Union	44,855	7.29		4	+1
Party for Freedom	30,267	4.92		2	–2
Party for the Animals	28,985	4.71		2	±0
Socialist Party	23,894	3.88		2	–2
Reformed Political Party	21,760	3.54		1	–1
50PLUS	17,705	2.88		1	±0
Denk	13,095	2.13	New	1	+1
U26 Municipalities	6,530	1.06	New	0	±0
Total Valid votes	615,355			49	±0
Blank votes	1,815	0.29			
Invalid votes	1,494	0.24			
Votes cast / turnout	618,664	61.57			
Registered voters	1,004,853				

==== Zeeland ====
Party	Popular vote			Seats	
Party	Votes	%	±pp	Total	+/−
Christian Democratic Appeal	27,810	16.27		7	+1
Reformed Political Party	20,624	12.06		5	–1
Forum for Democracy	20,168	11.80	New	5	+5
People's Party for Freedom and Democracy	17,580	10.28		4	–2
Labour Party	14,365	8.40		4	±0
Party for Freedom	10,668	6.24		2	–2
Party for Zeeland	10,619	6.21		2	+1
GreenLeft	9,992	5.84		2	+1
Christian Union	8,927	5.22		2	±0
50PLUS	8,764	5.13		2	+1
Socialist Party	8,240	4.82		2	–2
Democrats 66	6,409	3.75		1	–2
Party for the Animals	5,992	3.50	New	1	+1
Denk	814	0.48	New	0	±0
Total Valid votes	170,972			39	±0
Blank votes	424	0.25			
Invalid votes	416	0.24			
Votes cast / turnout	171,812	59.15			
Registered voters	290,453				

== Coalition talks ==
Coalition talks in the Netherlands are customarily organized by informateurs appointed by the party that came first in the elections, and then, in the event of a failure, by other parties. Informateurs usually submit a public report on possible coalitions in the weeks following the election.

Province	Informateur	Occupation / Reputation
Groningen	Mario Post	Former GL leader in the Estates
Friesland	Harry van der Molen	MP for CDA, Former City councillor of Leeuwarden
Drenthe	Roelie Goettsch	Former PvdA leader in the Estates
Overijssel	Geert Jansen, then	Province's former Queen's Commissioner, CDA member
Overijssel	Bart Krol	Former CDA member of the Utrecht Estates
Flevoland	Annemarie van Gaal	Entrepreneur
Gelderland	Mark Boumans	Mayor of Doetinchem (VVD), former Executive in Groningen
Utrecht	Bram van Ojik	Former leader of GL
North Holland	Hans Smits, then	Former Director of the Schiphol airport
North Holland	Laura Bromet and Cornelis Mooij	MPs for GL and VVD
South Holland	Hans Wiegel	Former leader of VVD, Friesland's former Queen's Commissioner
Zeeland	René Verhulst	Mayor of Ede (CDA)
North Brabant	Helmi Huijbregts	Senator for VVD
Limburg	Ger Koopmans	Leader of the CDA fraction in the Estates, former MP

== See also ==
- 2019 Bonaire general election
- 2019 Saban general election
- 2019 Sint Eustatius general election
