= Provincial Council of Groningen =

Provincial council in Groningen, Netherlands

Type
- Type: Provincial council

Leadership
- President: René Paas (CDA)
- Secretary: Nettie Engels-van Nijen

Structure
- Seats: 43
- Political groups: Government (25): GL (6); PvdA (5); CU (4); VVD (4); CDA (3); D66 (3); Opposition (18): SP (4); GB (3); FvD (2); PVV (2); PvhN (2); PvdD (1); 50+ (1); BVNL (1); OG (1); GO (1)

Elections
- Last election: 15 March 2023

Meeting place
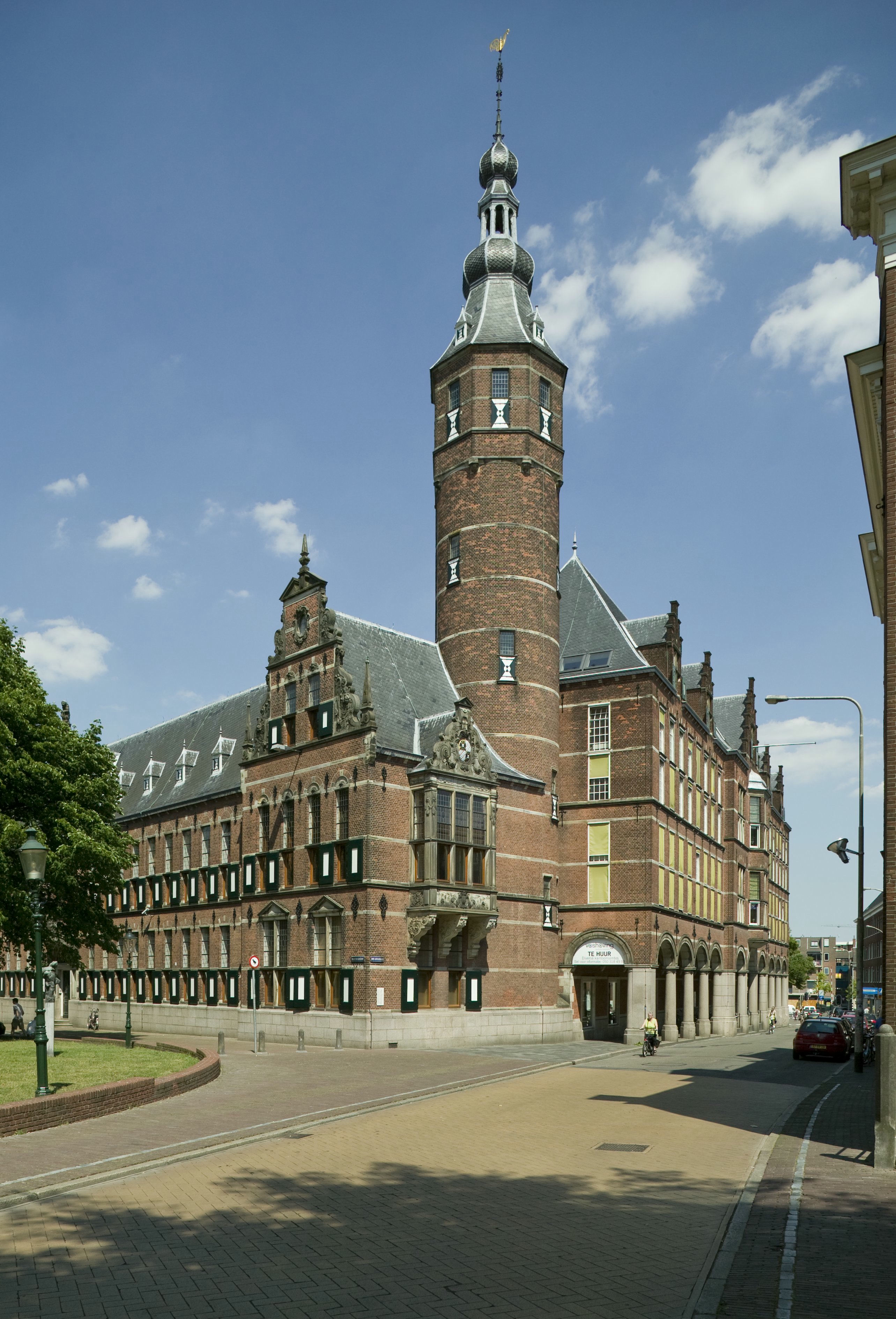
- Meeting place of the Provincial Council of Groningen in Groningen (city)

The Provincial Council of Groningen (Dutch: Provinciale Staten van Groningen, pronounced [proːvɪɲˈɕaːlə ˈstaːtə(ɱ) vɑŋ ˈɣroːnɪŋə(n)]), also known as the States of Groningen, is the provincial council of Groningen, Netherlands. It forms the legislative body of the province. Its 43 seats are distributed every four years in provincial elections.

== Current composition ==
Since the 2023 provincial elections, the distribution of seats of the Provincial Council of Groningen has been as follows:

Party	Votes	%	Seats	+/–
Farmer-Citizen Movement	67,744	23.54	12	+12
Labour Party	28,705	9.98	5	0
GroenLinks	27,767	9.65	5	-1
Christian Union	18,170	6.31	3	-1
Groninger Interest	17,385	6.04	3	0
People's Party for Freedom and Democracy	16,289	5.66	2	-2
Socialist Party	15,952	5.54	2	–2
Democrats 66	15,464	5.37	2	–1
Party for the Animals	14,421	5.01	2	+1
Party for Freedom	13,478	4.68	2	0
Christian Democratic Appeal	11,712	4.07	2	–1
Volt	10,927	3.80	1	+1
Other parties	10,257	3.56	0	0
Party for the North	8,331	2.90	1	-1
Forum for Democracy	7,018	2.44	1	-4
50PLUS	4,140	1.44	0	-1
Total	287,760	100.00	43	–
Valid votes	287,760	99.52		
Invalid/blank votes	1,389	0.48		
Total votes	289,149	100.00		
Registered voters/turnout	462,817	62.48		
Source: Kiesraad

== See also ==
- Provincial politics in the Netherlands
