= Henk Nijboer =

Dutch politician (born 1983)

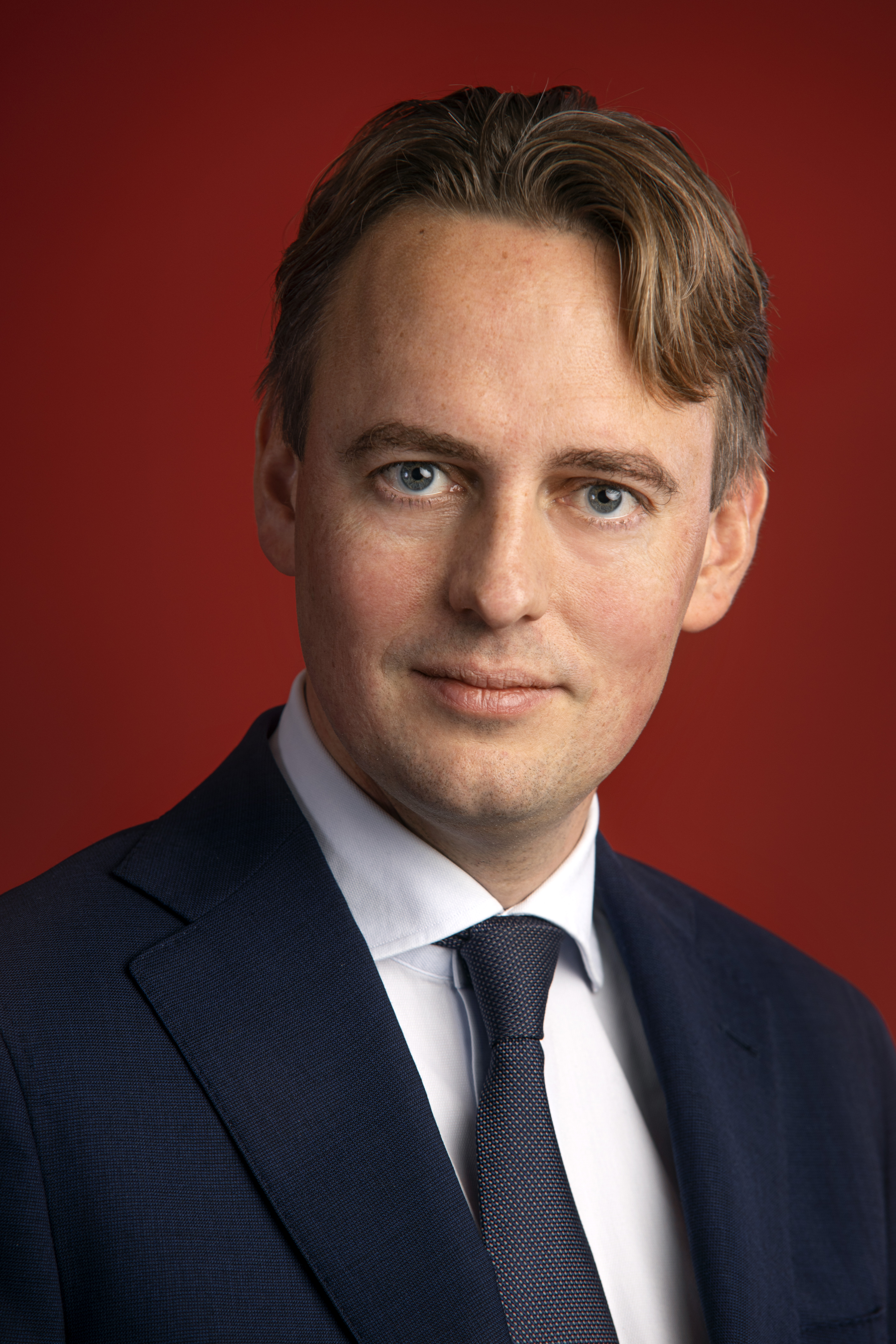
- Nijboer in 2020

Member of the House of Representatives
- In office 20 September 2012 – 5 December 2023

Member of the States of Groningen
- In office March 2003 – March 2007

Personal details
- Born: 31 March 1983 (age 43) Groningen, Netherlands
- Party: Labour Party
- Education: University of Groningen; Leiden University
- Occupation: Civil servant, researcher and politician

Henk Nijboer (born 31 March 1983) is a Dutch civil servant, researcher and politician of the Labour Party (PvdA) who served as a member of the House of Representatives from 2012 to 2023. Previously he was a member of the States of Groningen from 2003 to 2007. As a parliamentarian he focused on matters related to finance and housing.

== Decorations ==
Honours
Ribbon bar	Honour	Country	Date	Ref.
	Knight of the Order of Orange-Nassau	Netherlands	5 December 2023	
