= Provincial Council of Drenthe =

Provincial council in Drenthe, Netherlands

Type
- Type: Provincial council

Leadership
- President: Agnes Mulder (CDA)
- Secretary: Simone Buissink

Structure
- Seats: 43
- Political groups: Government (28): BBB (17); PvdA (4); VVD (4); CDA (3); Opposition (15): GL (2); SP (2); PVV (2); CU (2); PvdD (2); FvD (1); D66 (1); SL (1); Volt (1); JA21 (1)

Elections
- Last election: 15 March 2023

Meeting place
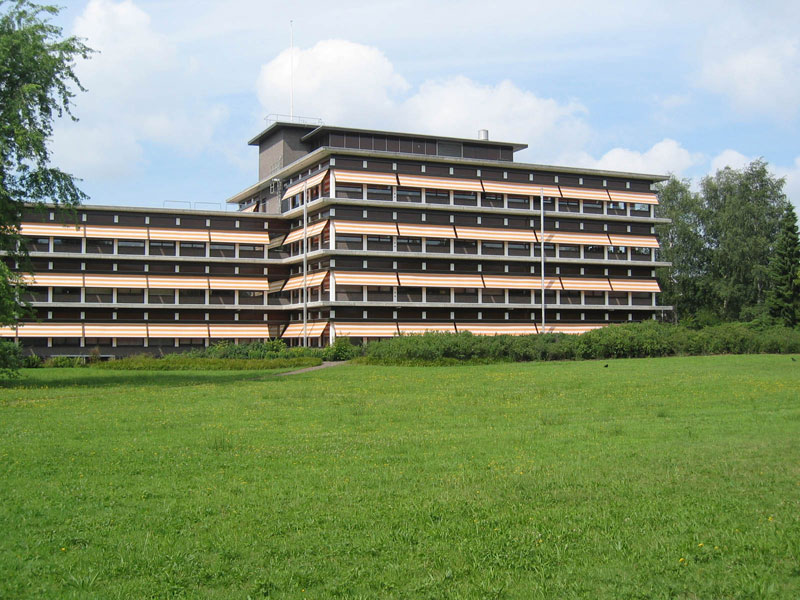
- Meeting place of the Provincial Council of Drenthe in Assen

Website
- www.drentsparlement.nl

The Provincial Council of Drenthe (Dutch: Provinciale Staten van Drenthe), also known as the States of Drenthe, is the provincial council of Drenthe, Netherlands. It forms the legislative body of the province. The Provincial Council currently holds 41 seats, which are distributed every four years in provincial elections. Due to the population of Drenthe having grown larger than 500.000 in September of 2022, the number of seats in the Provincial Council of Drenthe was set to be expanded from 41 to 43 after the 2023 provincial elections.

== Current composition ==
Since the 2023 provincial elections, the distribution of seats of the Provincial Council of Drenthe has been as follows:

Party	Votes	%	+/–	Seats	+/–
Farmer–Citizen Movement	88,176	33.41	New	17	New
Labour Party	24,861	9.42	–4.64	4	–2
People's Party for Freedom and Democracy	20,434	7.74	–5.31	4	–2
Christian Democratic Appeal	15,563	5.90	–4.65	3	–2
GroenLinks	14,756	5.59	–2.71	2	–2
Party for Freedom	13,681	5.18	–1.87	2	–1
Christian Union	12,803	4.85	–1.95	2	–1
Socialist Party	12,534	4.75	–1.72	2	–1
Party for the Animals	11,167	4.23	+0.80	2	+1
Democrats 66	9,981	3.78	–1.91	1	–1
Forum for Democracy	7,888	2.99	–10.46	1	–5
Volt	7,734	2.93	New	1	New
Strong Local Drenthe	7,485	2.84	–1.25	1	0
JA21	6,368	2.41	New	1	New
50PLUS	3,446	1.31	–2.39	0	–1
BVNL	3,257	1.23	New	0	New
Reformed Political Party	2,611	0.99	+0.19	0	0
Alliance	839	0.32	New	0	New
Jesus Lives	298	0.11	New	0	New
Total	263,882	100.00	–	43	+2
Valid votes	263,882	99.56			
Invalid votes	554	0.21			
Blank votes	601	0.23			
Total votes	265,037	100.00			
Registered voters/turnout	399,405	66.36	+7.55		
Source: Kiesraad

== See also ==
- Provincial politics in the Netherlands
