= Groninger Interest =

Groninger Interest Groninger Belang
- Leader: Bram Schmaal
- Chairperson: Hans Haze
- Founded: 2014
- Headquarters: Veendam, Netherlands
- Ideology: Regionalism
- Political position: Centre
- National affiliation: Independent Politics Netherlands
- Provincial Council of Groningen: 3 / 43
- Water board Noorderzijlvest: 1 / 19
- Water board Hunze en Aa's: 2 / 19

Website
- groningerbelang.nl

Groninger Interest (Dutch: Groninger Belang, pronounced [ˈɣroːnɪŋər bəˈlɑŋ]) is regionalist political party which is active in the province of Groningen, the Netherlands.

Groninger Interest is a party that emerged from a collaboration between local parties from the entire province of Groningen. In 2015, the party won its first seats in the Provincial Council of Groningen. In the Senate, the party works together with other regional parties under the name Independent Politics Netherlands, which has one seat there.

== Election results ==
=== Provincial council ===
Election	Votes	%	Seats	+/–
2015	15,869	6.57%	3 / 43	New
2019	18,556	7.27%	3 / 43	Steady
2023	17,385	6.04%	3 / 43	Steady

=== Water boards ===
Election	Water board	Votes	%	Seats	+/−
2023	Noorderzijlvest	11,352	6.55%	1 / 19	New
2023	Hunze en Aa's	19,883	9.74%	2 / 19	New
