= Party for Zeeland =

Party for Zeeland Partij voor Zeeland
- Founded: 1998
- Ideology: Regionalism; Localism
- Political position: Centre
- National affiliation: Independent Politics Netherlands
- Colours: blue, green, yellow
- Provincial Council of Zeeland: 2 / 39

Website
- https://partijvoorzeeland.nl/

The Party for Zeeland (Dutch: Partij voor Zeeland; PvZ) is a political party in the province of Zeeland in the Netherlands. It is one of the largest independent provincial political parties of the Netherlands, and arose through an alliance between the ZVP (Zeeuwsch Vlaamsche Volkspartij) and a number of local municipal political parties.

== Electoral performance ==
Provincial Council of Zeeland
Election	Votes	Share of votes	Seats won	Position	Outcome
1999	10,813	8.04%	4 / 47	6th	Opposition
2003	7,979	5.54%	2 / 47	5th	Opposition
2007	10,402	6.92%	2 / 39	7th	Opposition
2011	9,456	5.57%	2 / 39	7th	Opposition
2015	5,787	3.85%	1 / 39	10th	Opposition
2019	10,619	6.21%	2 / 39	7th	Opposition
2023	8,459	4.63%	2 / 39	7th	Opposition
