= Strong Local Drenthe =

Strong Local Drenthe Sterk Lokaal Drenthe
- Leader: Alfred Schoenmaker
- Chairperson: John Uffels
- Founded: 19 December 2014; 10 years ago
- Headquarters: Emmen, Netherlands
- Ideology: Regionalism
- Political position: Centre
- National affiliation: Independent Politics Netherlands
- Provincial Council of Drenthe: 1 / 43

Website
- sterklokaal.nl

Strong Local Drenthe (Dutch: Sterk Lokaal Drenthe, pronounced [ˈstɛr(ə)k loːˈkaːl ˈdrɛntə]) is a regionalist political party in the Netherlands, a partnership of various local political parties in the province of Drenthe. The party is represented in the Provincial Council in that province and is a member of Independent Politics Netherlands.

== History ==
Under the name Strong Local (Dutch: Sterk Lokaal), the party first participated in the elections for the Provincial Council of Drenthe in 2015 with Aimée van der Ham as lead candidate and won one seat. This seat was retained at the 2019 Dutch provincial elections. After the elections, the Strong Local and 50PLUS factions decided to merge into Strong Local Drenthe, which would give the party two seats, but the 50PLUS faction leader still decided to continue independently, starting the new party OpDrenthe. Strong Local did change its name to Strong Local Drenthe. The merger plans led to some unrest within the party: Assen alderman Janna Booij decided to cancel her membership of Strong Local, and the group leader of Strong Local left the Provincial Council.

The party retained its seat after the 2023 provincial elections. It is represented by Independent Politics Netherlands in the Dutch Senate.

== Positions ==
Some of Strong Local Drenthe's key points are:

- Fewer rules for small and medium-sized businesses
- Less interference from the province with the municipalities
- Better accessibility by improving the N34, the N48 and the Zwolle-Emmen railway line
- Fiber optic connections throughout the province
- Less focus on wind turbines and more on other sustainable forms of energy

== Election results ==
=== Provincial council ===
Election	Votes	%	Seats	+/–
2015	7,057	3.64%	1 / 41	New
2019	9,344	4.09%	1 / 41	Steady
2023	7,485	2.84%	1 / 43	Steady
