= Local Brabant =

Local Brabant Lokaal Brabant
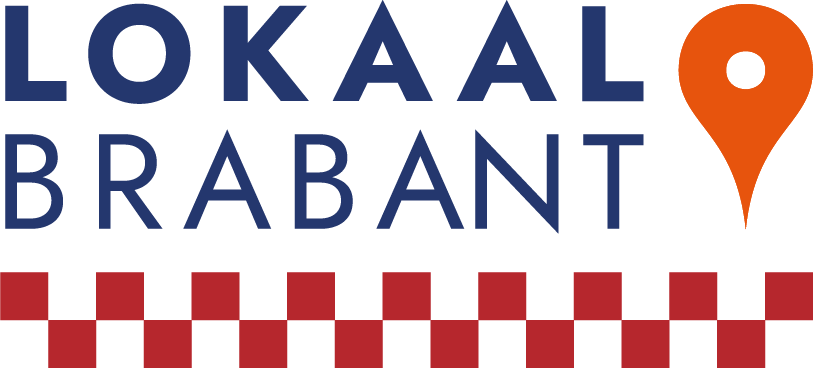
- Leader: Marc Oudenhoven
- Chairperson: John van Gorp
- Founded: 2014
- Headquarters: Rijen, Netherlands
- Ideology: Regionalism
- Political position: Centre
- National affiliation: Independent Politics Netherlands
- Provincial Council of North Brabant: 2 / 55

Website
- lokaal-brabant.nl

Local Brabant (Dutch: Lokaal Brabant, Dutch pronunciation: [loːˈkaːl ˈbraːbɑnt]) is a regionalist political party in the Netherlands. It is a partnership of various local political parties in the province of North Brabant. The party is represented in the Provincial Council in that province and is a member of Independent Politics Netherlands.

== History ==
Local Brabant participated for the first time in the 2015 provincial elections. The party obtained 1.9% of the votes, just enough for one seat, which was taken by Jan Heijman. Four years later, the party again participated in the 2015 provincial elections. With party leader Wil van Pinxteren, Local Brabant managed to slightly improve its score. The party obtained 2.5% and retained its seat. Van Pinxteren was previously a councilor in Haaren for the VVD and later as a one-man faction of local party Lokaal Liberaal Haaren. Before that he was a Provincial Councillor, also on behalf of the VVD.

From 15 May 2020, Local Brabant became part of the Provincial Executive of North Brabant. After long coalition negotiations, an agreement was reached between VVD, CDA, FvD and Local Brabant. Van Pinxteren was the representative on behalf of Local Brabant and had the portfolio of Leisure, Culture and Sports, and Governance and Security. In the Provincial Council he was succeeded by Harold van den Broek. In July 2021, the coalition stopped cooperation with FvD, after which Local Brabant went back into opposition. After Van den Broek became an alderman in the municipality of Maashorst in January 2022, Van Pinxteren again became a Provincial Councillor on behalf of Local Brabant.

Marc Oudenhoven was lead candidate for the 2023 provincial elections, when the party won two seats. Local Brabant has been represented by him and Hubert Koevoets in the Provincial Council since 29 March 2023. Davy Jansen has been a duo-raadslid for Local Brabant since 26 May 2023. The party was again involved in the executive negotiations, and Marc Oudenhoven became a deputy.

== Ideology ==
The party has no clear ideology and accuses the major political movements (that is, liberalism, socialism and Christian democracy) of having become "increasingly trapped in their own way of thinking." According to Local Brabant, the growth of support for local parties is a response to this and the party aims to also represent this voice in the provincial government.

== Election results ==
=== Provincial elections ===
Election	Votes	%	Seats	+/–
2015	15,226	1.84%	1 / 55	New
2019	25,485	2.52%	1 / 55	Steady
2023	45,723	4.17	2 / 55	▲1
