= Jaco Geurts =

Dutch politician (born 1970)

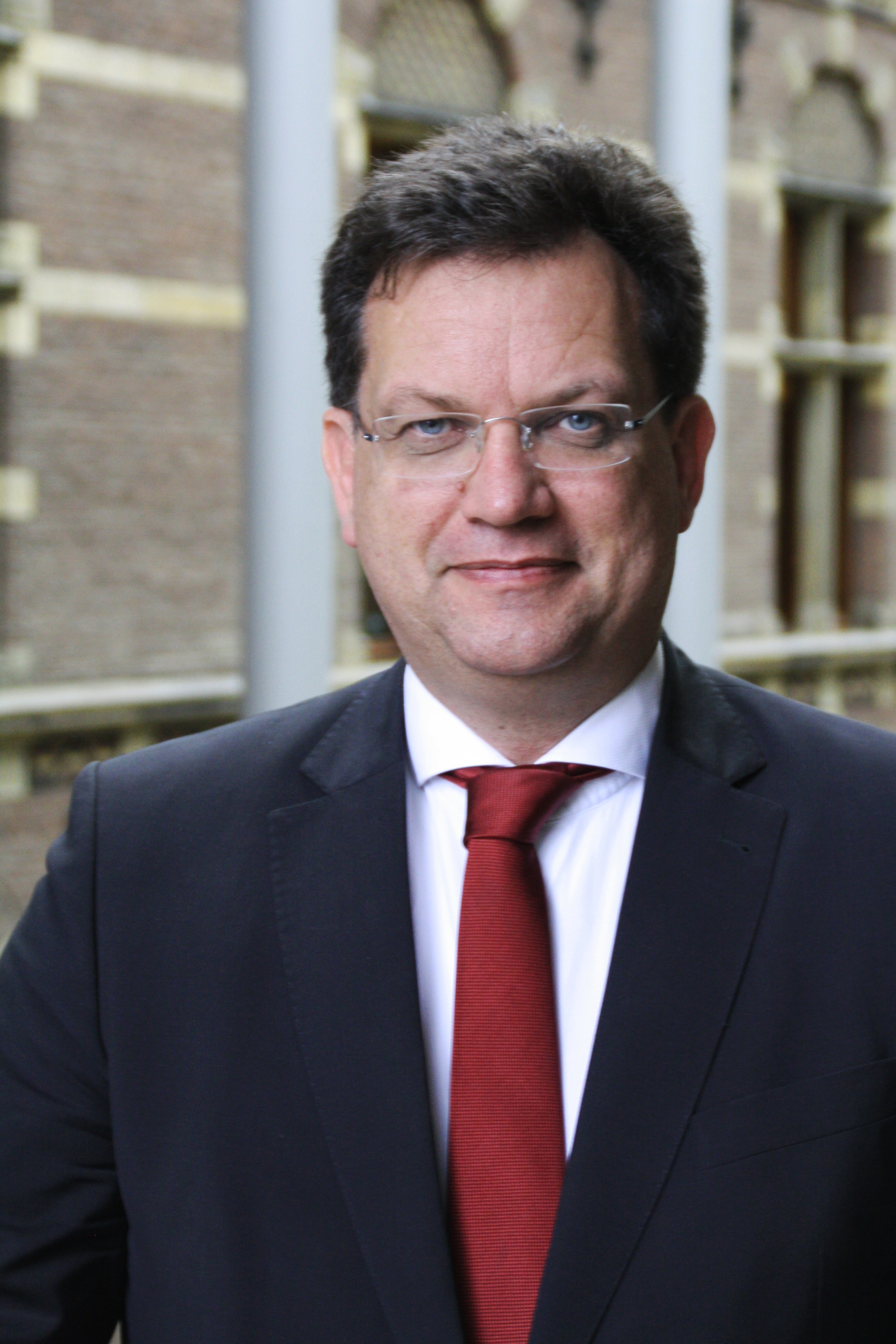
- Geurts in 2017

Mayor of Bunschoten
- Incumbent
- Assumed office 12 May 2025

Acting Mayor of Culemborg
- In office 27 January 2025 – March 2025

Acting Mayor of Maasdriel
- In office 1 June 2023 – 15 March 2024

Member of the House of Representatives
- In office 20 September 2012 – 9 May 2023

Member of the municipal council of Barneveld
- In office May 2006 – October 2012

Personal details
- Born: Jacob Lubertus Geurts; 11 July 1970 (age 55) Voorthuizen, Netherlands
- Party: Christian Democratic Appeal
- Occupation: Politician · farmer

Jacob Lubertus "Jaco" Geurts (born 11 July 1970) is a Dutch politician of the Christian Democratic Appeal (CDA) party and former pig farmer.

Geurts was a member of the municipal council of Barneveld from March 2006 until October 2012. He then served as an MP from September 2012 until May 2023, when he left to become acting mayor of Maasdriel, a post he held until March 2024. He was then acting mayor of Culemborg from January 2025 until he was appointed mayor of Bunschoten in March 2025.

Geurts is married and lives in Voorthuizen.

== Electoral history ==
Electoral history of Jaco Geurts
Year	Body	Party	Pos.	Votes	Result		Ref.
Year	Body	Party	Pos.	Votes	Party seats	Individual	Ref.
2021	House of Representatives	Christian Democratic Appeal	11	4,282	15	Won	
