= Independent Politics Netherlands =

Independent Politics Netherlands Onafhankelijke Politiek Nederland
- Chairperson: Jabik van der Bij (ad interim)
- Leader in the Senate: Auke van der Goot
- Founded: 22 March 1999
- Headquarters: Ruysdaellaan 34, Geleen
- Think tank: Wetenschappelijk Bureau OPNL
- Ideology: Regionalism
- Colours
- Slogan: De kracht van de regio ("The strength of the region")
- Senate: 1 / 75
- House of Representatives: 0 / 150
- European Parliament: 0 / 31

Website
- opnl.nl

Independent Politics Netherlands (Dutch: Onafhankelijke Politiek Nederland, OPNL), formerly known as the Independent Senate Group (Onafhankelijke Senaatsfractie, OSF), is a federation of local and regional political parties in the Netherlands that competes in elections to the Dutch Senate. OPNL is composed of provincial and municipal-level parties, and has no individual members.

OPNL only contests the elections for the Senate, where it represents regional politics. Auke van der Goot, a member of the Frisian National Party, represents OPNL in the Senate.

== History ==
In 1995, several provincial parties and The Greens proposed their own independent list for the Senate elections, called the Platform of Independent Groups/The Greens (Platform van Onafhankelijke Groepen/De Groenen). Marten Bierman (a member of The Greens) was elected through preferential vote. In 1999 Bierman was reelected.

In 2003, Henk ten Hoeve became senator for the OSF. He was a member of the Friesland states-provincial representing the Frisian National Party. He remained senator until 2011. Ten Hoeve was succeeded by Kees de Lange. De Lange was elected on the OSF list, but was a member of the 50PLUS party, with which the OSF had a vote sharing agreement, as the OSF did not achieve enough votes to get a seat independently. In 2015 De Lange broke with the OSF due to a disagreement concerning the possible cooperation between the OSF and the People's Party of Limburg of Jos van Rey, a former VVD alderman and representative plagued by corruption scandals.

In 2015, Henk ten Hoeve became senator of the OSF for a second time. Between 2019 and 2021 Gerben Gerbrandy, former mayor of Achtkarspelen, has been the senator representing the OSF. Gerbrandy left the Senate in January 2021 and was replaced by Ton Raven, a former alderman from Sittard-Geleen.

In 2021, the organisation's name was changed to Independent Politics Netherlands.

== Member parties ==
OPNL consists of the following regional parties:
Province	Party	2023 provincial election result		
Province	Party	Votes	%	Seats won
Drenthe	Strong Local Drenthe	7,485	2.84	1 / 43
Flevoland	Strong Local Flevoland	4,518	2.77	1 / 41
Friesland	Frisian National Party	27,298	8.05	4 / 43
Friesland	Provincial Interest Fryslân	6,891	2.03	1 / 43
Gelderland	Local Parties Gelderland	16,512	1.59	0 / 55
Groningen	Groninger Interest	17,385	6.04	3 / 43
Limburg	Local Limburg	20,128	4.30	2 / 47
North Brabant	Local Brabant	45,723	4.17	2 / 55
North Holland	Independent Politics North Holland	11,916	1.00	0 / 55
South Holland	Independent Politics South Holland	Did not participate		
Utrecht	U26 Municipalities	7,646	1.17	0 / 49
Zeeland	Party for Zeeland	8,458	4.63	2 / 39

== Electoral results ==
=== Senate elections ===
Election	Lead candidate	Result		
Election	Lead candidate	Weighted votes	%	Seats won
1995	Folkert Kuperus			1 / 75
1999	Marten Bierman	3,880	2.46	1 / 75
2003	Henk ten Hoeve	2,874	1.78	1 / 75
2007	Henk ten Hoeve	2,857	1.75	1 / 75
2011	Kees de Lange	2,113	1.77	1 / 75
2015	Henk ten Hoeve	2,652	2.46	1 / 75
2019	Gerben Gerbrandy	2,265	1.31	1 / 75
2023	Auke van der Goot	3,183	1.78	1 / 75
