= Party for the North =

Party for the North Partij voor het Noorden
- Chairperson: Lieuwe Terpstra
- Founded: 4 December 2002
- Ideology: Regionalism; Federalism
- National affiliation: Independent Politics Netherlands
- Provincial Council of Groningen: 1 / 43
- Groningen municipal council: 1 / 45
- Oldambt municipal council: 2 / 25

Website
- www.partijvoorhetnoorden.nl

The Party for the North (Dutch: Partij voor het Noorden, PvhN) is a regional political party in the Netherlands founded in December 2002 representing the interests of the provinces of Groningen, Friesland and Drenthe. The PvhN seeks a separate Parliament for these three northern provinces, and for 25% of the country's profits from natural gas to go directly to them.

== Elections ==
Since 11 March 2003, the PvhN has had two seats on the Provincial Council of Groningen, and (since 6 March 2006) one seat on the municipal council of Delfzijl. In the provincial elections of 7 March 2007, the party remained stable, getting 3.6% of the vote, but was reduced from two seats to one seat in Groningen due to the reduction of the total number of seats in each provincial council. In Friesland and Drenthe, where the party contested for the first time in the 2007 elections; it won no seats that year.

In the Senate the Party for the North has allied with the Independent Senate Group (OSF). The OSF has won one seat in the Senate, by Henk ten Hoeve at Stiens.

In the 2023 Dutch provincial elections, the party earned over 1% of the vote, a slight decrease on their previous result. Because of this, the party suffered the loss of one of its two seats, reducing their total to one seat. The party returned to OSF which rebranded themselves to "Independent Politics Netherlands" (OPNL).

== European Parliament ==
In 2004, the party participated in the election for the European Parliament. The party obtained 18,234 votes (0.4% of the vote overall, reaching 4-5% of the vote in some northern municipalities), not enough for a seat.

== Municipal councils ==
In the 2006 Dutch municipal elections, the PvhN for the first time contested in three cities (Groningen, Delfzijl and Emmen). In Delfzijl the party won one seat.
