= 2023 Dutch provincial elections =

- 15 March 2023
- All 572 seats in the provincial councils
- Turnout: 58.64%
Party	Vote %	Seats	+/–
BBB	19.19%	137	New
VVD	11.17%	63	−17
GL	8.96%	51	−8
PvdA	8.12%	46	−3
CDA	6.64%	43	−29
D66	6.34%	32	−9
PVV	5.76%	34	−6
PvdD	4.83%	25	+5
JA21	4.40%	22	New
SP	4.24%	23	−12
CU	3.66%	22	−9
FvD	3.07%	15	−71
Volt	3.00%	11	New
SGP	2.52%	16	+2
50+	2.30%	8	−9
OPNL	2.20%	16	+3
GL/PvdA	0.32%	6	0
CU–SGP	0.22%	1	0
PvhN	0.11%	1	−1
This lists parties that won seats. See the complete results below.

Provincial elections were held in the Netherlands on 15 March 2023, on the same day as the water board elections, as well as island council elections in the Caribbean Netherlands.

The elections resulted in sweeping victory for the Farmer–Citizen Movement (BBB), which had been formed three years earlier; it won the national popular vote, and alone won the most seats in nine of the twelve provinces. (It tied for most seats with the People's Party for Freedom and Democracy in North Holland and in South Holland, and with GroenLinks in Utrecht.) This is the first time in Dutch history that a political party won the popular vote in all twelve provinces.

These elections also indirectly determined the composition of the Senate, for the members of the twelve provincial states, alongside electoral colleges elected on the same day, elected the Senate's 75 members in the Senate election on 30 May, two months after the provincial elections.

== Electoral system ==
Elections for the provincial councils of the twelve provinces of the Netherlands are held every four years in March using the D'Hondt method. Voters also have the option to cast a preferential vote. The seats won by a list are first allocated to the candidates who, in preferential votes, have received at least 25% of the number of votes needed for one seat, regardless of their placement on the electoral list. If multiple candidates from a list pass this threshold, their ordering is determined based on the number of votes received. Any remaining seats are allocated to candidates according to their placement on the electoral list. The size of the provincial councils ranges from 39 members for a province with fewer than 400,000 inhabitants to 55 members for a province with more than 2,000,000 inhabitants. As of 2023 there are a total of 572 seats in the provincial councils.

== Participating parties ==
As of 21 December 2022, 49 parties have been registered with the Electoral Council for participation in general elections, a registration that carries over to provincial elections. A party can also participate in a province by registering its party name in that province instead of nationally. Which parties participate differs per province, with most large parties represented in the House of Representatives participating in all provinces, and some local and smaller national parties also participating.

== Seats summary ==
View source data.
View source data.

Legislatures and governments of the Provinces of the Netherlands, 2023–2027
Provincial councils
Province	BBB	VVD	GL	PvdA	CDA	PVV	D66	PvdD	SP	CU	SGP	JA21	FVD	Volt	50+	Provincial parties	Total
Drenthe	17	4	2	4	3	2	1	2	2	2		1	1	1		1: SLD 1	43
Overijssel	17	4	4	3	4	2	2	1	1	3	2	2	1	1			47
Friesland	14	3	3	5	4	2	1	1	1	2	-	1	1	-		5: FNP 4; PBF 1	43
Gelderland	14	6	5	5	4	2	3	2	2	3	3	2	1	2	1		55
Groningen	12	2	5	5	2	2	2	2	2	3			1	1		4: GB 3; PvhN 1	43
North Brabant	11	9	5	4	4	4	4	2	4	1		2	1	1	1	2: LB 2	55
Flevoland	10	4	3	3	2	3	2	2	2	2	2	2	2	-	1	1: SLF 1	41
Limburg	10	5	4	3	5	6	3	2	3		-	2	1	-	1	2: L-L 2	47
South Holland	8	8	6	4	4	4	4	3	2	2	2	4	2	1	1		55
Zeeland	9	4	6		5	2	1	1	1	1	5	1	1	-		2: PvZ 2	39
North Holland	8	8	7	7	2	3	4	4	2	1	-	3	2	2	2		55
Utrecht	7	6	7	3	4	2	5	3	1	3	2	2	1	2	1		49
Total	137	63	51	46	43	34	32	25	23	22	16	22	15	11	8	17	572
Total	137	63	6		43	34	32	25	23	1		22	15	11	8	17	572

A “-” in the table means that the party in question has not submitted a list of candidates for the 2023 election in that province.

== Detailed results ==
=== National ===
Graph of the party split among 572 seats.
Party or alliance		Votes	%	+/–	Seats	+/–
Farmer–Citizen Movement		1,488,372	19.19	New	137	New
People's Party for Freedom and Democracy		866,208	11.17	–2.82	63	–17
GL–PvdA	GroenLinks	694,678	8.96	–1.66	51	–9
GL–PvdA	Labour Party	629,912	8.12	–0.20	46	–3
GL–PvdA	GL–PvdA joint list in Zeeland	24,537	0.32	–0.03	6	0
GL–PvdA	Total	1,349,127	17.40	–1.88	103	–12
Christian Democratic Appeal		515,081	6.64	–4.43	43	–29
Democrats 66		491,881	6.34	–1.46	32	–9
Party for Freedom		446,301	5.76	–1.17	34	–6
Party for the Animals		374,459	4.83	+0.47	25	+5
JA21		340,942	4.40	New	22	New
Socialist Party		329,129	4.24	–1.67	23	–12
CU–SGP	Christian Union	283,986	3.66	–1.20	22	–9
CU–SGP	Reformed Political Party	195,598	2.52	+0.05	16	+2
CU–SGP	CU–SGP joint list in North Brabant	17,372	0.22	–0.05	1	0
CU–SGP	Total	496,956	6.41	–1.19	39	–7
Forum for Democracy		237,899	3.07	–11.46	15	–71
Volt		232,984	3.00	New	11	New
50PLUS		178,014	2.30	–1.34	8	–9
BVNL		76,360	0.98	New	0	New
DENK		47,135	0.61	–1.06	0	–4
OPNL	Local Brabant	45,723	0.59	+0.24	2	+1
OPNL	Frisian National Party	27,298	0.35	+0.02	4	0
OPNL	Local Limburg	20,128	0.26	+0.01	2	0
OPNL	Groningers' Interests	17,385	0.22	–0.02	3	0
OPNL	Local Parties Gelderland	16,512	0.21	+0.06	0	0
OPNL	Independent Politics-NH	11,916	0.15	New	0	New
OPNL	Party for Zeeland	8,458	0.11	–0.04	2	0
OPNL	U26 Municipalities	7,646	0.10	+0.01	0	0
OPNL	Strong Local Drenthe	7,485	0.10	–0.03	1	0
OPNL	Provincial Interests Frisia	6,891	0.09	+0.02	1	+1
OPNL	Strong Local Flevoland	4,518	0.06	New	1	New
OPNL	Total	170,358	2.20	+0.01	16	+3
General Water Board Party		34,022	0.44	New	0	New
Alliance		12,253	0.16	New	0	New
Together Local Twente		9,035	0.12	New	0	New
Party for the North		8,331	0.11	–0.03	1	–1
Pirate Party		6,406	0.08	New	0	New
GOLD		6,105	0.08	New	0	New
Jesus Lives		4,984	0.06	+0.03	0	0
Code Orange		4,915	0.06	–0.27	0	0
OUR Gelderland		4,680	0.06	New	0	New
Elderly Appeal - Heart for Brabant		4,245	0.05	–0.04	0	0
Limburg Seniors Party		4,136	0.05	New	0	New
Netherlands with a PLAN		3,518	0.05	New	0	New
Powerful Flevoland		2,879	0.04	New	0	New
On behalf of North-Hollanders		2,337	0.03	New	0	New
Look Back!		1,320	0.02	New	0	New
BLACK PETE IS BLACK		742	0.01	New	0	New
Heart for Freedom		228	0.00	New	0	New
Total		7,754,944	100.00	–	572	+2
Valid votes		7,754,944	99.41			
Invalid votes		19,956	0.26			
Blank votes		25,921	0.33			
Total votes		7,800,821	100.00			
Registered voters/turnout		13,265,777	58.80	+2.64		
Source: Kiesraad

=== By province ===
==== Drenthe ====
Party	Votes	%	+/–	Seats	+/–
Farmer–Citizen Movement	88,176	33.41	New	17	New
Labour Party	24,861	9.42	–4.64	4	–2
People's Party for Freedom and Democracy	20,434	7.74	–5.31	4	–2
Christian Democratic Appeal	15,563	5.90	–4.65	3	–2
GroenLinks	14,756	5.59	–2.71	2	–2
Party for Freedom	13,681	5.18	–1.87	2	–1
Christian Union	12,803	4.85	–1.95	2	–1
Socialist Party	12,534	4.75	–1.72	2	–1
Party for the Animals	11,167	4.23	+0.80	2	+1
Democrats 66	9,981	3.78	–1.91	1	–1
Forum for Democracy	7,888	2.99	–10.46	1	–5
Volt	7,734	2.93	New	1	New
Strong Local Drenthe	7,485	2.84	–1.25	1	0
JA21	6,368	2.41	New	1	New
50PLUS	3,446	1.31	–2.39	0	–1
BVNL	3,257	1.23	New	0	New
Reformed Political Party	2,611	0.99	+0.19	0	0
Alliance	839	0.32	New	0	New
Jesus Lives	298	0.11	New	0	New
Total	263,882	100.00	–	43	+2
Valid votes	263,882	99.56			
Invalid votes	554	0.21			
Blank votes	601	0.23			
Total votes	265,037	100.00			
Registered voters/turnout	399,405	66.36	+7.55		
Source: Kiesraad

==== Flevoland ====
Party	Votes	%	+/–	Seats	+/–
Farmer–Citizen Movement	33,987	20.83	New	10	New
People's Party for Freedom and Democracy	16,321	10.00	–3.17	4	–2
Party for Freedom	12,474	7.64	–1.63	3	–1
Labour Party	12,391	7.59	–0.62	3	0
GroenLinks	11,239	6.89	–1.64	3	–1
Christian Union	9,620	5.89	–1.14	2	–1
Democrats 66	9,255	5.67	+0.78	2	0
Christian Democratic Appeal	8,277	5.07	–3.24	2	–1
JA21	7,571	4.64	New	2	New
Party for the Animals	7,423	4.55	+0.17	2	0
Forum for Democracy	7,343	4.50	–13.29	2	–6
Socialist Party	6,915	4.24	–1.59	2	0
Reformed Political Party	6,835	4.19	+0.35	2	+1
Strong Local Flevoland	4,518	2.77	New	1	New
50PLUS	4,048	2.48	–2.45	1	–1
Powerful Flevoland	2,879	1.76	New	0	New
BVNL	2,104	1.29	New	0	New
Total	163,200	100.00	–	41	–
Valid votes	163,200	99.36			
Invalid votes	457	0.28			
Blank votes	588	0.36			
Total votes	164,245	100.00			
Registered voters/turnout	313,632	52.37	–1.22		
Source: Kiesraad

==== Friesland ====
Party	Votes	%	+/–	Seats	+/–
Farmer–Citizen Movement	94,458	27.86	New	14	New
Labour Party	36,023	10.62	–2.78	5	–1
Christian Democratic Appeal	29,669	8.75	–7.92	4	–4
Frisian National Party	27,298	8.05	+0.12	4	0
People's Party for Freedom and Democracy	22,843	6.74	–2.67	3	–1
GroenLinks	22,181	6.54	–1.15	3	0
Christian Union	17,883	5.27	–1.33	2	–1
Party for Freedom	15,102	4.45	–1.35	2	–1
Forum for Democracy	12,366	3.65	–9.78	1	–5
Socialist Party	11,724	3.46	–1.71	1	–1
Party for the Animals	11,402	3.36	+0.14	1	0
Democrats 66	11,237	3.31	–0.81	1	–1
JA21	9,096	2.68	New	1	New
Provincial Interests Frisia	6,891	2.03	+0.24	1	+1
BVNL	6,033	1.78	New	0	New
50PLUS	2,903	0.86	–1.69	0	–1
General Water Board Party	1,971	0.58	New	0	New
Total	339,080	100.00	–	43	–
Valid votes	339,080	99.54			
Invalid votes	730	0.21			
Blank votes	844	0.25			
Total votes	340,654	100.00			
Registered voters/turnout	519,118	65.62	+6.50		
Source: Kiesraad

==== Gelderland ====
Party	Votes	%	+/–	Seats	+/–
Farmer–Citizen Movement	244,553	23.59	New	14	New
People's Party for Freedom and Democracy	103,454	9.98	–3.98	6	–2
Labour Party	92,417	8.92	+0.59	5	0
GroenLinks	84,323	8.13	–2.70	5	–1
Christian Democratic Appeal	72,703	7.01	–4.57	4	–3
Christian Union	57,355	5.53	–1.25	3	–1
Democrats 66	54,943	5.30	–1.90	3	–1
Reformed Political Party	52,420	5.06	–0.19	3	0
Party for the Animals	46,502	4.49	+0.03	2	0
Party for Freedom	42,578	4.11	–1.95	2	–1
Volt	38,371	3.70	New	2	New
JA21	36,402	3.51	New	2	New
Socialist Party	36,090	3.48	–2.35	2	–1
Forum for Democracy	26,447	2.55	–10.88	1	–7
50PLUS	20,078	1.94	–1.87	1	–1
Local Parties Gelderland	16,512	1.59	+0.41	0	0
BVNL	6,812	0.66	New	0	New
OUR Gelderland	4,680	0.45	New	0	New
Total	1,036,640	100.00	–	55	–
Valid votes	1,036,640	99.49			
Invalid votes	2,120	0.20			
Blank votes	3,192	0.31			
Total votes	1,041,952	100.00			
Registered voters/turnout	1,618,965	64.36	+5.81		
Source: Kiesraad

==== Groningen ====
Party	Votes	%	+/–	Seats	+/–
Farmer–Citizen Movement	67,744	23.54	New	12	New
Labour Party	28,705	9.98	–2.01	5	0
GroenLinks	27,767	9.65	–2.84	5	–1
Christian Union	18,170	6.31	–3.14	3	–1
Groningers' Interests	17,385	6.04	–1.23	3	0
People's Party for Freedom and Democracy	16,289	5.66	–2.83	2	–2
Socialist Party	15,952	5.54	–3.14	2	–2
Democrats 66	15,464	5.37	–1.18	2	–1
Party for the Animals	14,421	5.01	+0.93	2	+1
Party for Freedom	13,478	4.68	–1.30	2	0
Christian Democratic Appeal	11,712	4.07	–4.01	2	–2
Volt	10,927	3.80	New	1	New
Party for the North	8,331	2.90	–1.22	1	–1
Forum for Democracy	7,018	2.44	–7.78	1	–4
JA21	4,961	1.72	New	0	New
50PLUS	4,140	1.44	–0.77	0	–1
Reformed Political Party	3,181	1.11	New	0	New
BVNL	1,856	0.64	New	0	New
Jesus Lives	259	0.09	New	0	New
Total	287,760	100.00	–	43	–
Valid votes	287,760	99.52			
Invalid votes	597	0.21			
Blank votes	792	0.27			
Total votes	289,149	100.00			
Registered voters/turnout	462,817	62.48	+6.41		
Source: Kiesraad

==== Limburg ====
Party	Votes	%	+/–	Seats	+/–
Farmer–Citizen Movement	86,392	18.47	New	10	New
Party for Freedom	59,290	12.68	–0.87	6	–1
People's Party for Freedom and Democracy	44,736	9.56	–0.60	5	0
Christian Democratic Appeal	43,319	9.26	–9.39	5	–4
GroenLinks	40,819	8.73	+0.32	4	0
Labour Party	32,646	6.98	+0.45	3	0
Socialist Party	31,213	6.67	–2.01	3	–1
Democrats 66	28,401	6.07	+0.27	3	0
Local Limburg	20,128	4.30	+0.24	2	0
JA21	19,170	4.10	New	2	New
Party for the Animals	17,574	3.76	–0.08	2	0
Forum for Democracy	15,876	3.39	–11.18	1	–6
50PLUS	11,773	2.52	–1.24	1	0
Limburg Seniors Party	4,136	0.88	New	0	New
BVNL	4,013	0.86	New	0	New
Christian Union	3,464	0.74	–0.33	0	0
General Water Board Party	2,598	0.56	New	0	New
Look Back!	1,320	0.28	New	0	New
Jesus Lives	631	0.13	New	0	New
Heart for Freedom	228	0.05	New	0	New
Total	467,727	100.00	–	47	–
Valid votes	467,727	99.28			
Invalid votes	1,293	0.27			
Blank votes	2,078	0.44			
Total votes	471,098	100.00			
Registered voters/turnout	873,557	53.93	+1.36		
Source: Kiesraad

==== North Brabant ====
Party	Votes	%	+/–	Seats	+/–
Farmer–Citizen Movement	199,858	18.24	New	11	New
People's Party for Freedom and Democracy	154,370	14.09	–2.09	9	–1
GroenLinks	84,755	7.73	–0.92	5	0
Labour Party	83,513	7.62	+1.22	4	+1
Socialist Party	83,435	7.61	–1.58	4	–1
Party for Freedom	74,508	6.80	–0.84	4	0
Democrats 66	73,317	6.69	–2.09	4	–1
Christian Democratic Appeal	72,275	6.60	–6.71	4	–4
JA21	46,142	4.21	New	2	New
Local Brabant	45,723	4.17	+1.65	2	+1
Party for the Animals	42,269	3.86	+0.13	2	0
Volt	32,203	2.94	New	1	New
Forum for Democracy	31,160	2.84	–11.61	1	–7
50PLUS	28,595	2.61	–1.50	1	–1
Christian Union – Reformed Political Party	17,372	1.59	–0.33	1	0
BVNL	9,626	0.88	New	0	New
Alliance	6,620	0.60	New	0	New
General Water Board Party	5,104	0.47	New	0	New
Elderly Appeal - Heart for Brabant	4,245	0.39	–0.27	0	0
Jesus Lives	814	0.07	New	0	New
Total	1,095,904	100.00	–	55	–
Valid votes	1,095,904	99.40			
Invalid votes	2,595	0.24			
Blank votes	3,977	0.36			
Total votes	1,102,476	100.00			
Registered voters/turnout	1,987,470	55.47	+2.90		
Source: Kiesraad

==== North Holland ====
Party	Votes	%	+/–	Seats	+/–
Farmer–Citizen Movement	161,876	13.64	New	8	New
People's Party for Freedom and Democracy	151,454	12.76	–1.76	8	–1
GroenLinks	135,205	11.40	–3.86	7	–2
Labour Party	131,566	11.09	+1.31	7	+1
Democrats 66	87,910	7.41	–2.53	4	–2
Party for the Animals	86,857	7.32	+1.25	4	+1
JA21	64,606	5.45	New	3	New
Party for Freedom	55,890	4.71	–0.89	3	0
Volt	53,448	4.50	New	2	New
Christian Democratic Appeal	47,429	4.00	–2.81	2	–2
Forum for Democracy	41,685	3.51	–11.82	2	–7
Socialist Party	40,104	3.38	–1.73	2	–1
50PLUS	36,234	3.05	+0.29	2	+1
Christian Union	24,753	2.09	–1.04	1	0
DENK	14,711	1.24	–1.16	0	–1
BVNL	13,603	1.15	New	0	New
Independent Politics-NH	11,916	1.00	New	0	New
General Water Board Party	8,931	0.75	New	0	New
Pirate Party	6,406	0.54	New	0	New
Code Orange	4,915	0.41	–1.02	0	0
Netherlands with a PLAN	3,518	0.30	New	0	New
On behalf of North-Hollanders	2,337	0.20	New	0	New
Jesus Lives	1,158	0.10	New	0	New
Total	1,186,512	100.00	–	55	–
Valid votes	1,186,512	99.32			
Invalid votes	3,684	0.31			
Blank votes	4,448	0.37			
Total votes	1,194,644	100.00			
Registered voters/turnout	2,102,298	56.83	+0.49		
Source: Kiesraad

==== Overijssel ====
Party	Votes	%	+/–	Seats	+/–
Farmer–Citizen Movement	185,921	31.45	New	17	New
Christian Democratic Appeal	48,488	8.20	–8.90	4	–5
People's Party for Freedom and Democracy	47,074	7.96	–4.98	4	–2
GroenLinks	43,825	7.41	–2.07	4	–1
Labour Party	39,599	6.70	–1.80	3	–1
Christian Union	34,807	5.89	–2.37	3	–1
Party for Freedom	28,864	4.88	–2.30	2	–1
Reformed Political Party	21,621	3.66	–0.25	2	0
Democrats 66	21,270	3.60	–2.17	2	–1
JA21	21,046	3.56	New	2	New
Party for the Animals	21,010	3.55	+0.52	1	0
Socialist Party	17,632	2.98	–2.90	1	–2
Volt	17,617	2.98	New	1	New
Forum for Democracy	16,091	2.72	–10.55	1	–5
Together Local Twente	9,035	1.53	New	0	New
50PLUS	7,114	1.20	–2.23	0	–1
Alliance	4,794	0.81	New	0	New
BVNL	4,615	0.78	New	0	New
Jesus Lives	701	0.12	New	0	New
Total	591,124	100.00	–	47	–
Valid votes	591,124	99.48			
Invalid votes	1,419	0.24			
Blank votes	1,675	0.28			
Total votes	594,218	100.00			
Registered voters/turnout	913,363	65.06	+5.79		
Source: Kiesraad

==== South Holland ====
Party	Votes	%	+/–	Seats	+/–
Farmer–Citizen Movement	203,417	13.67	New	8	New
People's Party for Freedom and Democracy	195,478	13.14	–2.52	8	–2
GroenLinks	145,904	9.81	+0.75	6	+1
Democrats 66	112,097	7.53	–1.00	4	–1
Labour Party	103,896	6.98	–0.84	4	0
Party for Freedom	95,062	6.39	–0.61	4	0
Christian Democratic Appeal	92,531	6.22	–1.52	4	0
JA21	91,113	6.12	New	4	New
Party for the Animals	72,664	4.88	+0.51	3	+1
Reformed Political Party	61,514	4.13	+0.23	2	0
Christian Union	61,283	4.12	–1.45	2	–1
Forum for Democracy	53,067	3.57	–13.86	2	–9
Socialist Party	50,616	3.40	–0.72	2	0
50PLUS	45,186	3.04	–1.41	1	–1
Volt	42,652	2.87	New	1	New
DENK	22,068	1.48	–1.25	0	–1
BVNL	18,341	1.23	New	0	New
General Water Board Party	13,797	0.93	New	0	New
GOLD	6,105	0.41	New	0	New
Jesus Lives	1,123	0.08	+0.03	0	0
Total	1,487,914	100.00	–	55	–
Valid votes	1,487,914	99.33			
Invalid votes	4,682	0.31			
Blank votes	5,398	0.36			
Total votes	1,497,994	100.00			
Registered voters/turnout	2,747,402	54.52	+0.03		
Source: Kiesraad

==== Utrecht ====
Party	Votes	%	+/–	Seats	+/–
Farmer–Citizen Movement	85,890	13.16	New	7	New
GroenLinks	83,904	12.86	–3.21	7	–1
People's Party for Freedom and Democracy	77,461	11.87	–4.44	6	–2
Democrats 66	60,835	9.32	–0.13	5	0
Christian Democratic Appeal	52,223	8.00	–1.88	4	–1
Labour Party	44,295	6.79	–0.51	3	–1
Party for the Animals	36,883	5.65	+0.94	3	+1
Christian Union	35,987	5.52	–1.77	3	–1
Volt	30,032	4.60	New	2	New
JA21	28,180	4.32	New	2	New
Party for Freedom	26,667	4.09	–0.83	2	0
Reformed Political Party	24,724	3.79	+0.25	2	+1
Socialist Party	16,880	2.59	–1.29	1	–1
Forum for Democracy	13,498	2.07	–9.53	1	–5
50PLUS	11,625	1.78	–1.10	1	0
DENK	10,356	1.59	–0.54	0	–1
U26 Municipalities	7,646	1.17	+0.11	0	0
BVNL	4,666	0.72	New	0	New
BLACK PETE IS BLACK	742	0.11	New	0	New
Total	652,494	100.00	–	49	–
Valid votes	652,494	99.49			
Invalid votes	1,425	0.22			
Blank votes	1,894	0.29			
Total votes	655,813	100.00			
Registered voters/turnout	1,033,686	63.44	+1.87		
Source: Kiesraad

==== Zeeland ====
Party	Votes	%	+/–	Seats	+/–
Farmer–Citizen Movement	36,100	19.76	New	9	New
Labour Party – GroenLinks	24,537	13.43	–0.82	6	0
Reformed Political Party	22,692	12.42	+0.36	5	–1
Christian Democratic Appeal	20,892	11.43	–4.84	5	–2
People's Party for Freedom and Democracy	16,294	8.92	–1.36	4	0
Party for Freedom	8,707	4.77	–1.47	2	0
Party for Zeeland	8,458	4.63	–1.58	2	0
Christian Union	7,861	4.30	–0.92	1	–1
Democrats 66	7,171	3.92	+0.17	1	0
JA21	6,287	3.44	New	1	New
Party for the Animals	6,287	3.44	–0.06	1	0
Socialist Party	6,034	3.30	–1.52	1	–1
Forum for Democracy	5,460	2.99	–8.81	1	–4
50PLUS	2,872	1.57	–3.56	0	–2
General Water Board Party	1,621	0.89	New	0	New
BVNL	1,434	0.78	New	0	New
Total	182,707	100.00	–	39	–
Valid votes	182,707	99.55			
Invalid votes	400	0.22			
Blank votes	434	0.24			
Total votes	183,541	100.00			
Registered voters/turnout	294,064	62.42	+3.27		
Source: Kiesraad
