= Christian Union (Netherlands) =

Christian Union ChristenUnie
- Abbreviation: CU
- Leader: Mirjam Bikker (list)
- Chairman: Marco Vermin
- Leader in the Senate: Tineke Huizinga
- Leader in the House of Representatives: Mirjam Bikker
- Founded: 22 January 2000
- Merger of: Reformed Political League; Reformatory Political Federation
- Headquarters: Partijbureau ChristenUnie; Johan van Oldebarneveltlaan 46, Amersfoort
- Youth wing: PerspectieF
- Think tank: Mr. G. Groen van Prinsterer Stichting
- Membership (2026): 24,224
- Ideology: Christian democracy; Social conservatism
- Political position: Centre-left or centre-right
- Religion: Orthodox Protestant (Note: "Orthodox Protestantism" is a term which is used in the Netherlands to refer to conservative forms of Protestantism in contrast to liberal or free-thinking forms of Protestantism. This includes conservative branches of the Dutch Reformed Church and the Reformed Churches of the Netherlands (now united in the Protestant Church of the Netherlands), but also to independent forms of Reformed Protestantism, such as the Reformed Churches (Liberated) or other more conservative forms of Protestantism, such as the certain branches of Baptism like Reformed and Primitive Baptists. It is unrelated to the Eastern Orthodox Church.)
- European affiliation: European Christian Political Party
- European Parliament group: ECR Group (2009–2019); EPP Group (2019–2024)
- Benelux Parliament group: Christian Group
- Colours: Sky blue Dark blue
- Slogan: Opstaan voor het Goede ('Standing up for What's Right')
- Senate: 3 / 75
- House of Representatives: 3 / 150
- European Parliament: 0 / 31
- Provincial councils: 21 / 570
- King's Commissioners: 1 / 12
- Benelux Parliament: 1 / 21

Website
- christenunie.nl

The Christian Union (Dutch: ChristenUnie [ˌkrɪstənˈyni, -təˈʔy-], CU) is a Christian democratic political party in the Netherlands. The CU is a centrist party, maintaining more progressive stances on economic, immigration and environmental issues while holding more socially conservative positions on issues, such as opposing abortion and euthanasia. The party describes itself as "social Christian".

The CU was founded in 2000 as a merger of the Reformed Political League (GPV) and Reformatory Political Federation (RPF). After doubling its seat tally in the 2006 Dutch general election, it became the smallest member of the fourth Balkenende cabinet, and since that time has been likewise part of the third Rutte cabinet and the fourth Rutte cabinet. In some elections it forms an alliance with the Calvinist Reformed Political Party (SGP), which, unlike the CU, is a testimonial party.

Primarily a Protestant party, the CU bases its policies on the Bible, and takes the theological principles of charity and stewardship as bases for its support for public expenditure and environmentalism. It seeks for government to uphold Christian morality, but supports freedom of religion under the doctrine of sphere sovereignty. The party is moderately Eurosceptic; it was formerly in the European Parliament with the European Conservatives and Reformists Group (ECR Group) and European People's Party Group (EPP Group). It is a member of the European Christian Political Party.

== History ==
=== Precursors ===
The predecessors of the CU: the Reformed Political League and the Reformatory Political Federation

Along with the larger Anti-Revolutionary Party (ARP), the Netherlands has a long tradition of small orthodox or conservative Protestant (i.e., mostly Reformed) parties in parliament, including the Reformed Political Party (SGP), founded in 1918. After a group of Reformed Churches members formed the Reformed Churches (Liberated) over a religious disagreement, the Reformed Political Alliance (GPV) split off from the ARP in 1948. It took until 1963 for the party to enter parliament. In the 1981 election, the Reformatory Political Federation (RPF) entered parliament. It had split off from the ARP six years earlier over the formation of the Christian Democratic Appeal (CDA).

The RPF explicitly stated in its manifesto of principles that it sought to unite all reformed parties in the Netherlands.

== Ideology ==
The CU describes itself as a "Christian social" party, and is often described as either centre-left or centre-right. The party has its roots in orthodox Protestant (i.e. mostly Reformed) parties, often referred to as the "small right". It combines a conservative point of view on ethical and foreign policy issues, with more centre-left ideas on economic, asylum, social and environmental issues. Its conservative reformed ideals are reflected in its program of principles. It believes that the state is the swordmaiden of God. It bases its politics directly on the Bible. Other Christian principles, such as neighbourly love and stewardship for the Earth, however have given the CU's political program a centre left orientation. The party has also been described as centre-left or left-wing overall.

Some of CU's socially conservative policies include:

- Facilitation by government of a one-earner model, allowing one parent, usually the wife, to stay at home and take care of the children.
- Society should cherish its collective moments of rest, and preferably leave Sunday a day of rest.
- Abortion and euthanasia-practices should be reduced and eventually replaced by alternatives, such as care of women with unwanted pregnancies and palliative care.
- The Dutch policy of toleration of soft drugs should be abandoned.
- Combatting prostitution.
- Defending the freedom of education (that is, to found religious schools), because of sphere sovereignty.
- The Netherlands should remain an independent political entity within the European Union.
- Limiting the use of genetic manipulation.

More centre-left policies include:

- Public services of education, health care and social security should remain state run, but on a smaller scale than is presently the case.
- Increased budgets for development cooperation in order to address the poverty in the global south.
- A more open policy towards asylum seekers, especially those who are persecuted for religious reasons.
- A green environmental policy. Based on its electoral promises on investment in green energy, the Dutch branch of Greenpeace termed CU the greenest political party in 2006.

=== Social issues ===
The CU describes itself as Christelijk-sociaal ('social Christian') and explicitly distance themselves from the labels Christian socialism or Christian right. "Social Christian" describes a Christian democratic ideology that is more right-wing than Christian socialism and more left-wing than the Christian right and social conservatism. Described as centrist and Orthodox Protestant, it has an emphasis on the community, social solidarity, support for a welfare state, and support for some regulation of market forces but is more conservative on some social issues opposition to euthanasia, embryonic stem cell research, same-sex marriage, abortion, and some elements of the EU. The party is left of centre on issues such as asylum policy, development aid, green environmental policy and the economy.

In May 2019, the Christian Union voted against banning gay conversion therapy. In 2025, however, the CU said they would vote for banning conversion therapy in the future, if certain judicial problems were removed from the proposed law.

On immigration, the CU supports a work permit scheme for immigrants with integration requirements such as learning Dutch to prevent what the party calls a "parallel society". It calls for a humane asylum policy, especially for those fleeing religious persecution and for the creation of asylum centres outside of Europe to combat human trafficking. It seeks a faster processing measure for asylum seekers.

=== Foreign policy ===
The CU supports Dutch membership of the European Union while simultaneously being critical of several EU policies which it claims are undemocratic and "mainly benefits large companies and the upper middle classes". The CU instead calls for more transparency within the EU, for domestic decision making of EU member states to be complied with and wants reforms made to the Eurozone. The CU is also against the accession of Turkey to the European Union.

In the Middle East, the CU platform expresses support for Israel and its right to exist on the basis that "Christians feel a biblical connection to the Jewish people" and supports moving the Dutch embassy to Jerusalem while stating that civilians on both sides should be protected, with the party highlighting Palestinian Christians as a concern. The party condemned the 2023 October 7 attacks and maintained Israel has a right to defend itself against terrorism while appealing to both sides to respect international law and for the allowance of humanitarian aid to Palestinian civilians. The CU says it supports recognition of a Palestinian state with an economic recovery and investment plan for Gaza on the conditions of the release of Israeli hostages and the dismantling of Hamas with no extremist organizations playing a role in Palestinian governance.

The party supports international recognition of the Armenian genocide.

== Election results ==
=== House of Representatives ===
Election	Lead candidate	List	Votes	%	Seats	+/–	Government
2002	Kars Veling	List	240,953	2.54	4 / 150	▼1	Opposition
2003	André Rouvoet	List	204,649	2.12	3 / 150	▼1	Opposition
2006	André Rouvoet	List	390,969	3.97	6 / 150	▲3	Coalition
2010	André Rouvoet	List	305,094	3.24	5 / 150	▼1	Opposition
2012	Arie Slob	List	294,586	3.13	5 / 150	Steady	Opposition
2017	Gert-Jan Segers	List	356,271	3.39	5 / 150	Steady	Coalition
2021	Gert-Jan Segers	List	350,523	3.37	5 / 150	Steady	Coalition
2023	Mirjam Bikker	List	212,532	2.04	3 / 150	▼2	Opposition
2025	Mirjam Bikker	List	201,361	1.90	3 / 150	Steady	Opposition

=== Senate ===
Election	Votes	%	Seats	+/–
1999			4 / 75	▲2
2003			2 / 75	▼2
2007			4 / 75	▲2
2011			2 / 75	▼2
2015	32		3 / 75	▲1
2019	33	5.03	4 / 75	▲1
2023	23	3.73	3 / 75	▼1

=== European Parliament ===
Election	List	Votes	%	Seats	+/–	EP Group
2004 (Note: In a joint list with Reformed Political Party.)	List	279,880	5.87	1 / 27	New	IND/DEM
2009	List	310,540	6.82	1 / 25	0	ECR
2009	List	310,540	6.82	1 / 26	0	ECR
2014	List	364,843	7.67	1 / 26	0	ECR
2019	List	375,660	6.83	1 / 26	0	EPP
2019	List	375,660	6.83	1 / 29	0	EPP
2024	List	180,060	2.89	0 / 31	▼1	–
