= Halsema (disambiguation) =

Halsema may refer to:

- Eusebius Julius Halsema (1882–1945), engineer and mayor, see Municipio de San Fernando
- Femke Halsema, mayor of Amsterdam since June 2018
- Halsema Highway, a Philippine major highway in northern Luzon
