= 2017 Dutch general election =

- 15 March 2017
- All 150 seats in the House of Representatives; 76 seats needed for a majority
- Turnout: 81.93% (▲7.36pp)
Party	Leader	Vote %	Seats	+/–
VVD	Mark Rutte	21.29	33	−8
PVV	Geert Wilders	13.06	20	+5
CDA	Sybrand van Haersma Buma	12.38	19	+6
D66	Alexander Pechtold	12.23	19	+7
GL	Jesse Klaver	9.13	14	+10
SP	Emile Roemer	9.09	14	−1
PvdA	Lodewijk Asscher	5.70	9	−29
CU	Gert-Jan Segers	3.39	5	0
PvdD	Marianne Thieme	3.19	5	+3
50PLUS	Henk Krol	3.11	4	+2
SGP	Kees van der Staaij	2.08	3	0
Denk	Tunahan Kuzu	2.06	3	New
FVD	Thierry Baudet	1.78	2	New
This lists parties that won seats. See the complete results below.
Most voted-for party by municipality
Cabinet before	Cabinet after
Second Rutte cabinet VVD–PvdA	Third Rutte cabinet VVD–CDA–D66–CU

General elections were held in the Netherlands on Wednesday 15 March 2017 to elect all 150 members of the House of Representatives.

The incumbent government of Prime Minister Mark Rutte was the first to serve a full term since 2002. The previous elections in 2012 had resulted in a ruling coalition of his People's Party for Freedom and Democracy (VVD) and the Labour Party (PvdA). Because the second Rutte cabinet lacked a majority in the Senate, it relied on the support of Democrats 66 (D66), the Christian Union (CU) and the Reformed Political Party (SGP).

The VVD lost seats but remained the largest party, while the PvdA saw a massive loss in vote share and seats, failing to win a single municipality for the first time in the party's history. The Party for Freedom (PVV) made gains to reach second place, with the CDA, D66 and GroenLinks also increasing their number of seats. It was clear that at least four partners would be needed for a coalition with a parliamentary majority. The official election results were certified and published on 21 March. The elected MPs took their seats on 23 March.

== Electoral system and organisation ==
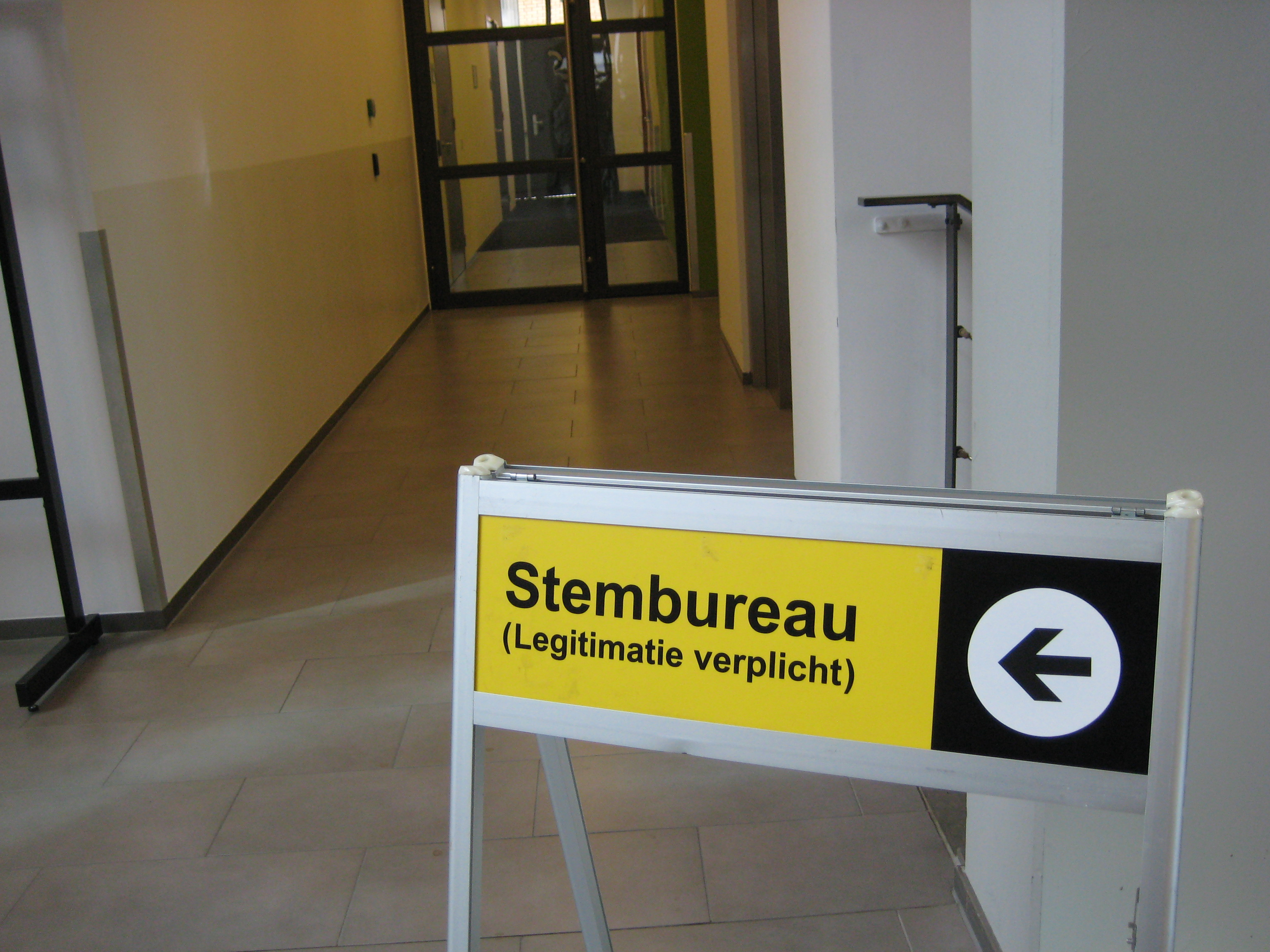
Polling station in Winterswijk

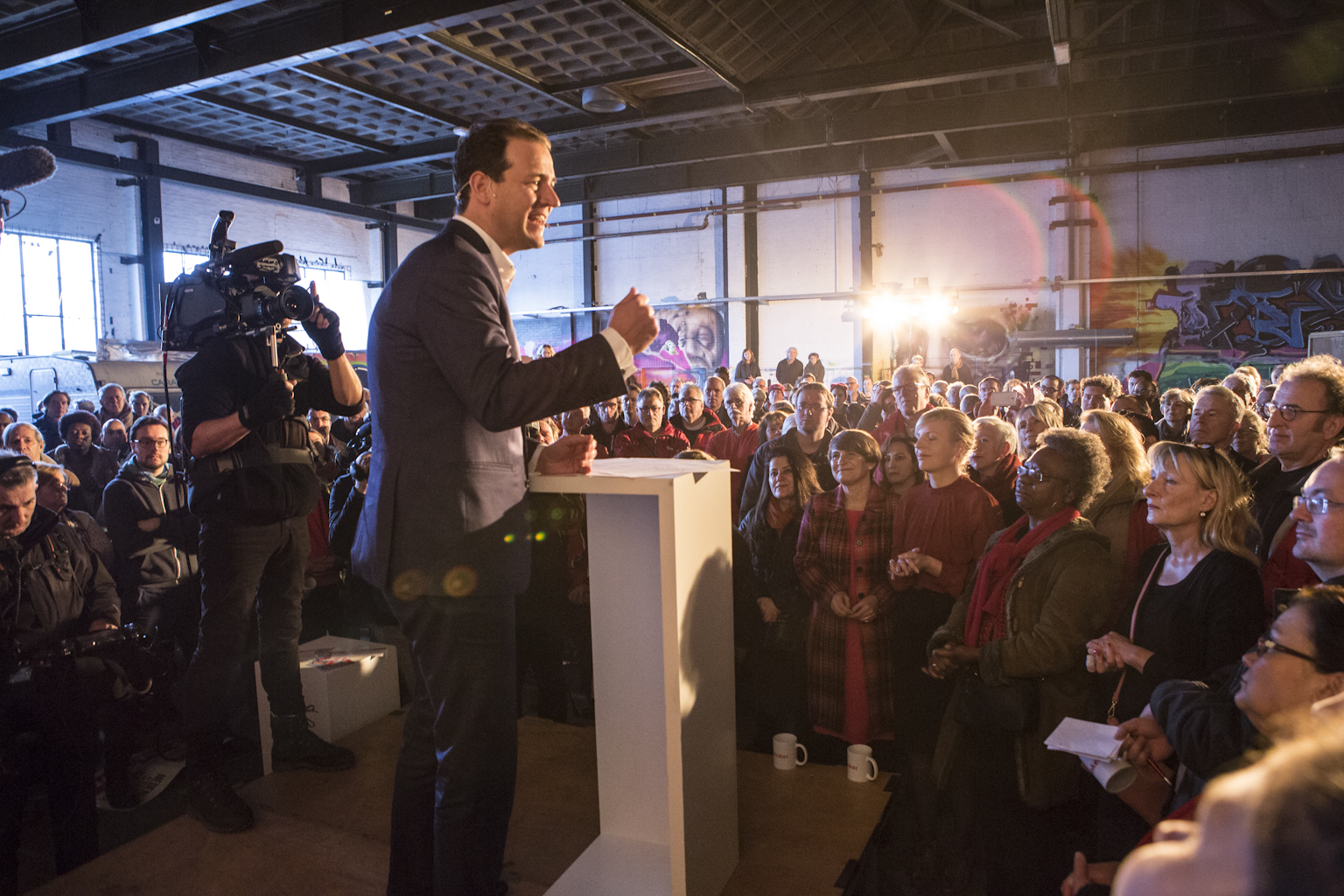
Asscher campaigning

The House of Representatives (Dutch: Tweede Kamer) is composed of 150 seats elected by proportional representation in a single nationwide constituency, with a legal threshold of 1 full seat (0.67%), and residuals assigned by the D'Hondt method. The Senate is indirectly elected by the States-Provincial.

Electronic voting has been banned since 2007; votes must be cast with a red pencil.

Following reports from the General Intelligence and Security Service (Algemene Inlichtingen- en Veiligheidsdienst, AIVD) that Russian hacking groups Fancy Bear and Cozy Bear had made several attempts to hack into Dutch ministries, including the Ministry of General Affairs, to gain access to secret government documents. Minister of the Interior and Kingdom Relations Ronald Plasterk announced that votes for the election would therefore be processed by hand, although that decision was later reversed.

The election was also seen as an indication of interest in the national political system in the Caribbean Netherlands, after the low turnout seen there in the 2012 election.

== Participating parties ==
List	Party		Lead candidate	Districts
1	People's Party for Freedom and Democracy	VVD	Mark Rutte	20
2	Labour Party	PvdA	Lodewijk Asscher	20
3	Party for Freedom	PVV	Geert Wilders	20
4	Socialist Party	SP	Emile Roemer	20
5	Christian Democratic Appeal	CDA	Sybrand van Haersma Buma	20
6	Democrats 66	D66	Alexander Pechtold	20
7	Christian Union	CU	Gert-Jan Segers	20
8	GroenLinks	GL	Jesse Klaver	20
9	Reformed Political Party	SGP	Kees van der Staaij	20
10	Party for the Animals	PvdD	Marianne Thieme	20
11	50PLUS	50+	Henk Krol	20
12	Entrepreneurs Party	OP	Hero Brinkman	20
13	VoorNederland	VNL	Jan Roos	20
14	DENK	DENK	Tunahan Kuzu	20
15	Nieuwe Wegen	NiWe	Jacques Monasch	20
16	Forum for Democracy	FVD	Thierry Baudet	20
17	The Civil Movement	DBB	Ad Vlems	19
18	Free-minded Party	VP	Norbert Klein	19
19	GeenPeil	GP	Jan Dijkgraaf	19
20	Pirate Party	PP	Ancilla van de Leest	19
21	Artikel 1	A1	Sylvana Simons	18
22	Non-Voters	NS	Peter Plasman	16
23	Libertarian Party	LP	Robert Valentine	16
24	Lokaal in de Kamer	LidK	Jan Heijman	16
25	Jezus Leeft	JL	Florens van der Spek	7
26	StemNL	SNL	Mario van den Eijnde	9
27	Human and Spirit/Basic Income Party/Peace and Justice	MenS–BIP	Tara-Joëlle Fonk	2
28	Free Democratic Party	VDP	Burhan Gökalp	2

== Campaign ==
The 2017 Dutch–Turkish diplomatic incident happened less than a week before the election; it was speculated that this benefited the Prime Minister's party (VVD), as Rutte's response to the incident was well received.

=== Debates ===
2017 Dutch general election debates
Date	Organisers	Venue	P Present NI Non-invitee A Absent invitee										Note
Date	Organisers	Venue	Roemer	Krol	Thieme	Klaver	Asscher	Pechtold	Rutte	Segers	Buma	Wilders	Note
26 February	RTL Nieuws	De Rode Hoed	P	NI	NI	P	P	P	A	NI	P	A	
5 March	BNR Nieuwsradio, RTL Nieuws, Elsevier	Carré Theatre	P	P	P	P	P	P	P	A	P	A	
13 March	EenVandaag	Erasmus University	NI	NI	NI	NI	NI	NI	P	NI	NI	P	
14 March	NOS	Binnenhof	P	P	P	P	P	P	P	P	P	P	

== Opinion polls ==
Polls showed a precipitous collapse for both the VVD and PvdA following their decision to form a coalition government together after the 2012 elections, with support for the latter splitting among other left-wing or liberal parties. As with other right-wing populist parties, the Party for Freedom (PVV) rose in polls during the European migrant crisis, with the party topping polls from September 2015 through to late February 2017. However, in the relative absence of Geert Wilders during the campaign – notably refusing to participate in both RTL debates – support for the PVV collapsed, and the VVD secured a narrow lead in the final weeks before the election.

The seat projections in the graphs below are continuous from September 2012 (the last general election) up to the current date. Each colored line specifies a political party; numbers on the vertical axis represent numbers of seats. These seat estimates are derived from estimates by Peilingwijzer ("polling indicator") by Tom Louwerse, a professor of political science at Leiden University; they are not strictly polling averages, but the results of a model calculating a "trajectory" for each party based on changes in support over time between polls conducted by I&O Research, Ipsos, TNS NIPO, LISS panel, Peil, and De Stemming, and adjusting for the house effects of each individual pollster.

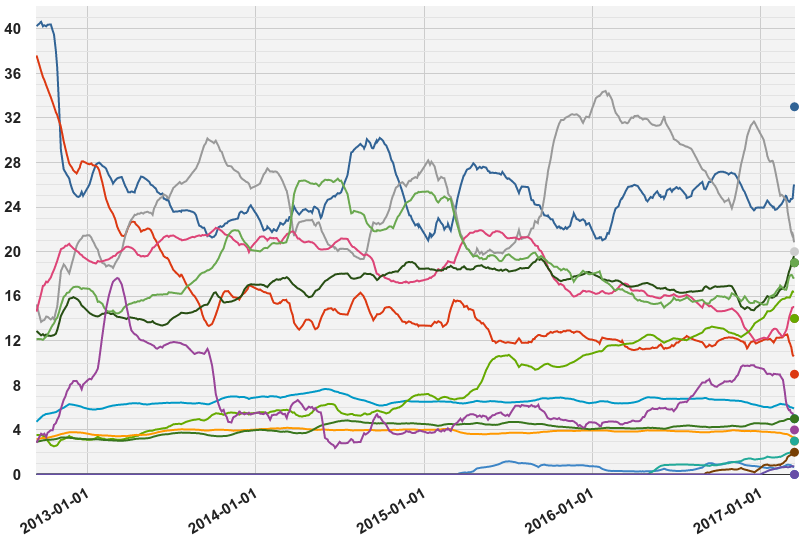

VVD
PvdA
PVV
SP
CDA
D66
CU
GL
SGP
PvdD
50+
VNL
DENK
FVD
PPNL

== Results ==
Preliminary results were published on 15 March, and the official result was announced at 16:00 CET on 21 March. The total wasted vote was 161,327 votes or 1.55 %.

Party	Votes	%	Seats	+/–
People's Party for Freedom and Democracy	2,238,351	21.29	33	−8
Party for Freedom	1,372,941	13.06	20	+5
Christian Democratic Appeal	1,301,796	12.38	19	+6
Democrats 66	1,285,819	12.23	19	+7
GroenLinks	959,600	9.13	14	+10
Socialist Party	955,633	9.09	14	−1
Labour Party	599,699	5.70	9	−29
Christian Union	356,271	3.39	5	0
Party for the Animals	335,214	3.19	5	+3
50PLUS	327,131	3.11	4	+2
Reformed Political Party	218,950	2.08	3	0
DENK	216,147	2.06	3	New
Forum for Democracy	187,162	1.78	2	New
VoorNederland	38,209	0.36	0	New
Pirate Party	35,478	0.34	0	0
Artikel 1	28,700	0.27	0	New
Nieuwe Wegen	14,362	0.14	0	New
Entrepreneurs' Party	12,570	0.12	0	New
Lokaal in de Kamer	6,858	0.07	0	New
Non-Voters	6,025	0.06	0	New
Civil Movement	5,221	0.05	0	New
GeenPeil	4,945	0.05	0	New
Jezus Leeft	3,099	0.03	0	New
Free-Minded Party	2,938	0.03	0	New
Libertarian Party	1,492	0.01	0	0
MenS–BIP–V-R	726	0.01	0	0
StemNL	527	0.01	0	New
Free Democratic Party	177	0.00	0	New
Total	10,516,041	100.00	150	0
Valid votes	10,516,041	99.55		
Invalid/blank votes	47,415	0.45		
Total votes	10,563,456	100.00		
Registered voters/turnout	12,893,466	81.93		
Source: Kiesraad

=== By province ===
Results by province
Province	VVD	PVV	CDA	D66	GL	SP	PvdA	CU	PvdD	50+	SGP	DENK	FvD	Others
Drenthe	19.6	12.8	14.4	10.2	7.8	11.9	8.6	4.6	2.6	3.5	0.8	0.3	1.8	1.1
Flevoland	20.7	14.7	10.7	10.0	7.9	8.1	5.1	4.7	3.2	3.8	3.9	2.1	2.1	3.0
Friesland	17.0	11.2	18.9	9.7	8.4	11.1	8.4	5.1	2.9	2.9	0.9	0.2	1.8	1.5
Gelderland	20.9	11.7	13.9	11.9	8.8	9.1	5.4	4.5	2.9	2.8	4.1	1.4	1.5	1.1
Groningen	13.9	11.2	11.6	12.6	11.9	13.9	8.3	6.0	3.6	2.8	0.7	0.5	1.6	1.4
Limburg	17.9	19.6	14.9	10.6	6.8	13.7	4.0	0.6	2.9	4.6	0.1	1.1	2.0	1.2
North Brabant	24.1	14.6	13.3	11.6	7.8	12.3	4.2	1.2	2.6	3.3	0.5	1.7	1.6	1.2
North Holland	23.2	10.8	8.0	14.8	12.3	7.1	6.8	1.8	4.4	3.1	0.4	3.0	2.0	2.3
Overijssel	18.7	11.6	19.8	10.6	7.0	9.2	5.5	6.0	2.1	2.5	3.0	1.5	1.5	1.0
South Holland	22.1	14.5	10.2	12.1	8.7	6.7	5.5	3.7	3.3	3.1	3.1	3.3	2.1	1.6
Utrecht	22.7	10.0	10.7	15.3	11.7	5.7	5.2	4.9	3.4	2.3	2.6	2.7	1.5	1.3
Zeeland	19.7	13.3	13.5	8.1	6.2	9.5	5.6	4.6	2.9	3.5	9.5	0.7	1.7	1.2
Caribbean Netherlands	12.4	4.2	23.6	25.9	8.9	5.5	7.1	3.0	3.5	1.3	0.4	0.5	1.3	2.4

== Government formation ==
The election resulted in a House of Representatives where at least four parties would be required to form a coalition with a majority (76 seats). Media sources speculated that incumbent Prime Minister Mark Rutte of the VVD would seek to form a government with the support of the centre-right CDA and liberal D66. CU was thought to be the most likely candidate to be the fourth member of the coalition. Minister of Health, Welfare and Sport, Edith Schippers, was selected by the VVD to serve as the party's informateur on 16 March and appointed by Speaker of the House Khadija Arib, seeking to determine whether Jesse Klaver of GroenLinks solely desired a left-wing government, or instead simply viewed the VVD as an unlikely coalition partner. Similarly, talks with Emile Roemer of the Socialist Party (SP), who repeatedly stated during the campaign that his party would not govern with the VVD, remained a possibility.

The leaders of D66, CDA, PvdA, VVD, SP, GroenLinks, and CU stated that they would not enter a coalition with the PVV, and Roemer has also said that the SP will not join a coalition with the VVD.

The first proposed coalition was one involving the VVD-CDA-D66 and GroenLinks. This was the preferred coalition of Alexander Pechtold, Lodewijk Asscher and Gert-Jan Segers, while Jesse Klaver continued to argue that the major policy differences between GL and the VVD would make a coalition difficult. Nevertheless, the four parties began more serious negotiations toward a coalition agreement. Nederlandse Omroep Stichting (NOS) reported that "labour market reform, investment in law enforcement and additional money for nursing homes" would be areas of agreement between the parties, while "refugee policy, income distribution, climate and medical ethics issues are potential stumbling blocks".

On 15 May, talks on the proposed four-way VVD-CDA-D66-GL coalition failed. It was reported that the main dispute concerned immigration, but GL leader Jesse Klaver cited climate issues and income differences as other issues where the parties disagreed. The end of the talks was reported to be a consensus decision, with no party blaming any others.

Coalition talks were reported to be at an impasse, with the VVD and CDA favouring a coalition with the CU, D66 favouring a coalition with either PvdA or SP, SP being absolutely opposed to a coalition with the VVD, CDA being opposed to a coalition without the VVD, PvdA rejecting any coalition, and all parties with more than five seats rejecting a coalition with the PVV. D66 said that it would consider a coalition with the CU very difficult due to disagreements on medical-ethical issues such as doctor-assisted suicide, due to the lack of representation of the political left within that coalition, and due to the small majority of one seat in both chambers, which could make for an unstable coalition.

In late June 2017, discussions began again between VVD, D66, CDA and CU under the lead of new informateur Herman Tjeenk Willink. After a three-week summer break, talks resumed on 9 August 2017, and were reported to be close to a conclusion due to representatives of unions and employers’ organizations joining the discussions, which typically happens near the end of such negotiations. In September 2017, a budget deal compromise was reached allowing the coalition talks to continue. While still 'close to conclusion', it appeared likely that the talks about government formation would exceed the record since World War II of 208 days set in 1977. After 208 days of negotiations, the VVD, D66, CDA and CU agreed to a coalition under a third informateur, Gerrit Zalm, and all members of the House of Representatives of the involved parties approved the agreement on 9 October 2017. On 26 October the new cabinet was formally installed 225 days after the elections, setting a record for the longest cabinet formation in history.

== See also ==
- 2016 Labour Party leadership election
- 2017 Dutch–Turkish diplomatic incident
- List of members of the House of Representatives of the Netherlands, 2017–2021
