= Jezus Leeft =

Dutch political party

- Leader: Florens van der Spek
- Founded: November 2013
- Ideology: Evangelism; Social conservatism Anti-abortion; Stewardship theology Hard Euroscepticism
- Political position: Right-wing
- Senate: 0 / 75
- House of Representatives: 0 / 150
- States-Provincial: 0 / 572

Website
- www.jezusleeft.nl

Jezus Leeft (English: Jesus Lives) is a political party in the Netherlands that was founded in November 2013.

== History ==
The history of the party lies with Joop van Ooijen's evangelisation; he originally spread the gospel by distributing flyers at cycling races in which his son participated. After an accident, he stopped using flyers. In 2008, he painted the text 'JEZUS REDT' (Jesus Saves) on the roof of his farm with reflective paint, which is generally used for painting road markings. The incident resulted in a civil case by the municipality of Giessenburg, which made headlines in 2009 and 2010.

The party participated in Giessenlanden and some other municipalities in the 2014 Dutch municipal elections. The party also participated in the 2014 European Parliament election in the Netherlands with nine candidates on the list. In the 2015 Dutch provincial elections the party participated in North Brabant, Flevoland, Utrecht, and South Holland. In none of these cases did the party win a seat.

In the 2017 Dutch general election, Jesus Lives participated in seven electoral districts, with Florens van der Spek as party leader. The party won 3,099 votes, which was not enough for a seat. In the 2018 Dutch municipal elections the party took part in 15 different municipalities in three provinces. No seat was obtained in any of these. In the 2022 municipal elections, the party took part in 20 different municipalities, again being unable to win a seat. That year, the party gained its highest percentage of votes in the municipality of Urk, with 2.0%.

The party ran again in the 2021 Dutch general election, but gained no seats. The party also intended to participate during the 2023 general election, but failed to deliver a sufficient amount of so-called 'support statements' and was therefore left out by the Electoral Council.

== Ideology ==
According to the party's founder, Joop van Ooijen, the party's primary purpose is making Jesus known to the people. The party opposes abortion, the European Union, and supports environmentalism. Van Ooijen has said that the party's anti-abortion stance is non-negotiable, having said that he would "not sit at the table with someone who supports abortion, that is not open to discussion. We will not negotiate, that's what's different between us and the other Christian parties." In that same interview, he expressed confidence that he would get the 64,000 votes in the 2017 Dutch general election required to obtain a seat, but they would end up getting 3,099 votes.

The party stands for freedom of expression of faith. However, the party is opposed to the construction of new mosques, synagogues, and other non-Christian places of worship.

== Election results ==
=== Dutch general elections ===
Election	List	Votes	%	Seats	+/–
2017	List	3,099	0.03%	0 / 150	New
2021	List	5,057	0.05%	0 / 150	Steady

== See also ==
- Christian right
