= "Jesus saves" case =

Dutch lawsuit

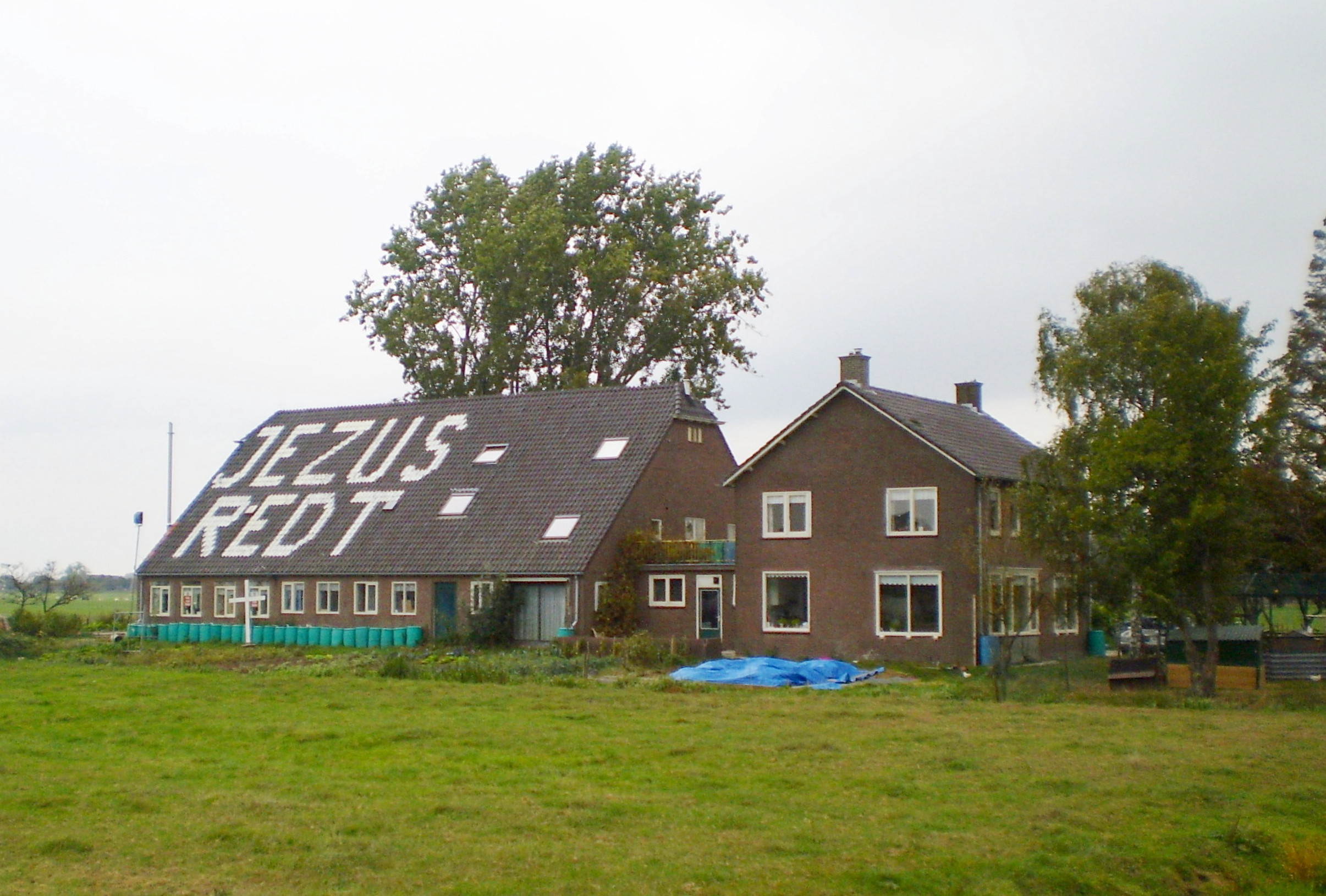
The roof text in its original version (2009)

The "Jesus saves" case was a Dutch lawsuit between Joop van Ooijen and Giessenlanden municipality.

== Background ==
The farm in question, named "Giessen-Staete", is owned by the Van Ooijen family. Farmer Joop van Ooijen, a father of sixteen, and his wife Petra underwent a radical conversion to the Christian faith, and Joop began proselytizing in 2003 by distributing leaflets at cycling races in which his sons participated. After a collision involving one of his sons, Van Ooijen turned away from what he considered the "loveless" world of cycling and dedicated himself fully to spreading the gospel. He took to the streets to try to convince people in the Alblasserwaard of the message of eternal life through Jesus.

== The roof inscription ==
Van Ooijen initially only placed a banner with the text "Jezus leeft" in his front garden. Unsatisfied with the banner, which he thought was "only visible to cyclists", to make the message visible from a nearby highway he painted "JEZUS REDT" (Jesus Saves) on the roof of his farmstead. To ensure the text was visible in the dark, the Van Ooijens aimed spotlights at the roof.

== Legal battle ==
Giessenlanden municipality took issue with the text shortly after its completion. In a letter to Van Ooijen, the municipality indicated that the text did not fit into the landscape: according to municipal aesthetics regulation and the "Woningwet" the letters were too large and too contrasting. And as Van Ooijen did not have a permit, he was threatened with a fine of 500 euros per week. According to Van Ooijen, this threatened his freedom of speech and freedom of religion, and he received support from various quarters, including people who did not support his message. The municipality indicated that there would be no further issue if the message covered a smaller area. Van Ooijen refused and pointed to other large inscriptions found in the municipality in his defence.

The legal battle became a protracted affair. A special appeals committee was established and a hearing regarding the case was held in the summer of 2009, which ruled in favour of the municipality. However, the Van Ooijen family took no action to remove the offending text, and a new coat of paint was applied over the letters. Some time later, the administrative court in Dordrecht ruled that the municipality would have to reconsider the case and that, until then, the inscription did not have to be removed. Van Ooijen accepted that ruling, but thought that the court should have ruled that the decision was in violation of religious freedom.

On December 3, 2009, the municipality imposed a fine of 15,000 euros on Van Ooijen. He also brought this measure before the Council of State, which ruled on July 14, 2010 in favour of the municipality. Van Ooijen then announced that he would take the case to the European Court of Human Rights. When the municipality ordered the white roof tiles removed, he had the letters painted orange (JEZUS), representing Jesus as king, and red (REDT), representing the blood of Christ, by a number of young people on August 31, 2010. The municipality of Giessenlanden nevertheless decided to proceed with enforcement, fining Van Ooijen 500 euros per week that the orange-red text remained in place. His lawyer announced new legal action. In summary proceedings, the courts declared in favour of Van Ooijen; the municipality of Giessenlanden had to stop collecting fines because its decision contained no mention of orange and red letters. In November 2010, the municipality and Van Ooijen came to a compromise to settle the conflict: the text would be made smaller (the letters would no longer be 13, but 10 roof tiles high) and made up of classic orange roof tiles.

== Aftermath ==
The lawsuit became very famous in the Netherlands. The word "dakevangelist" became the third most popular word in the Van Dale's election for the lifestyle word of the year. Since 2012, Van Ooijen has ran a poster campaign with his 'Jesus Saves' posters at various sites around the Giessenburg area. With these campaigns, he has come into conflict with local authorities, ending up in jail in September 2013 because of a poster campaign.

Van Ooijen later led the political party Jezus Leeft and participated in the 2014 Dutch local elections, obtaining zero seats.
