= Entrepreneurs' Party (Netherlands) =

Entrepreneurs' Party OndernemersPartij
- Abbreviation: OP
- Leader: Hero Brinkman
- Chairperson: Martine Gaasbeek
- Founder: Hero Brinkman
- Founded: 22 April 2015
- Dissolved: 2019
- Ideology: Liberal conservatism Entrepreneurs' interests
- Political position: Right-wing
- Colors: Purple; Light blue

Website
- ondernemerspartij.nl

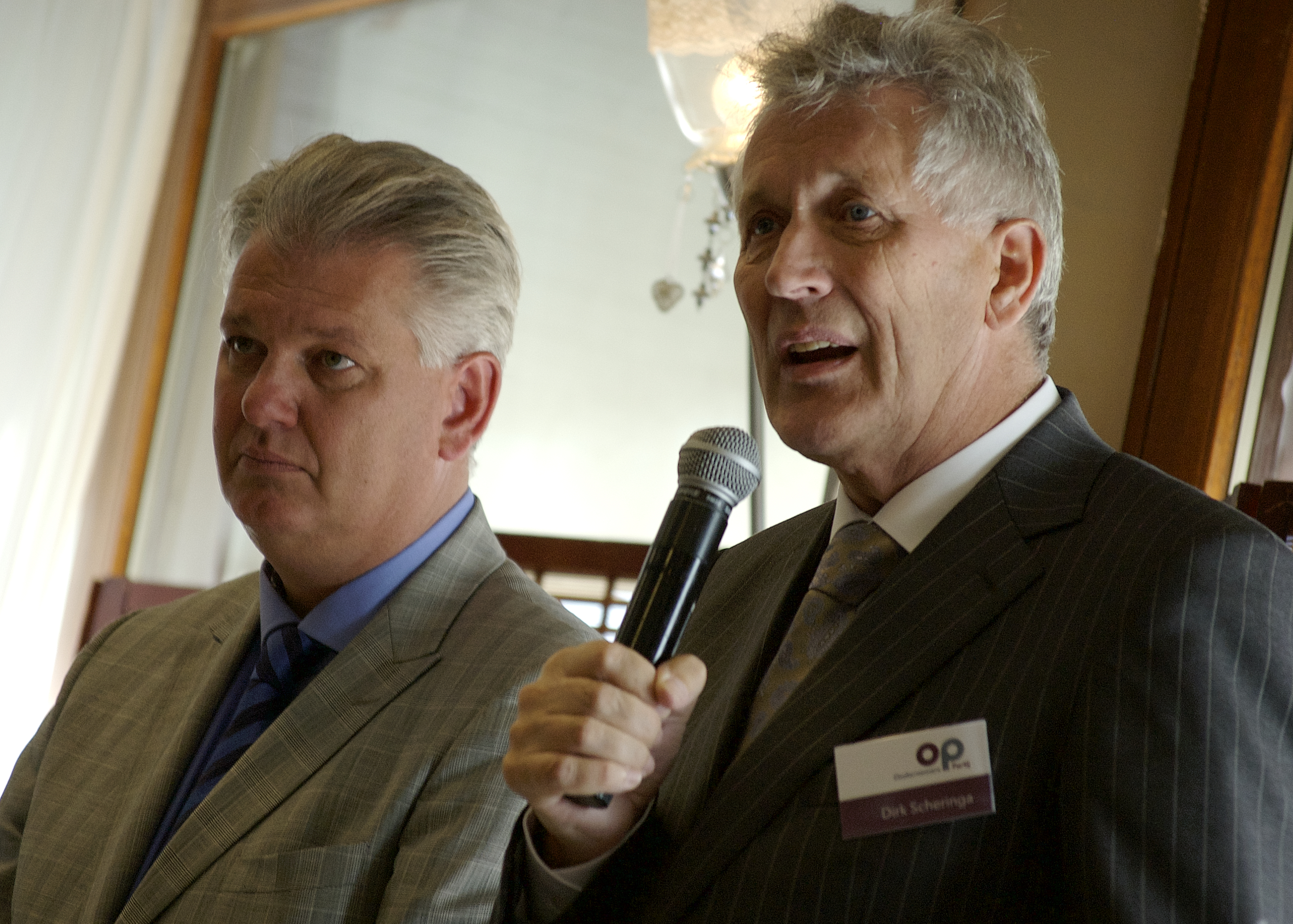
Hero Brinkman (left) and Dirk Scheringa (right), 2015

The Entrepreneurs' Party (Dutch: OndernemersPartij, pronounced [ˌɔndərˈneːmərspɑrˌtɛi]; OP) was a political party in the Netherlands founded on 22 April 2015. The founder and political leader of the party is Hero Brinkman, who was in the House of Representatives for the Party for Freedom from 2006 to 2012.

The party took part in the 2017 House of Representatives elections, but did not win a seat with 0.12% of the votes. A striking name on the candidate list was radio DJ Patrick Kicken. Initially, former DSB Bank director Dirk Scheringa was also going to participate in the elections, but he was expelled in March 2016 when he had not paid his contributions. After the party failed to win a single seat, it was dissolved.

== Ideology ==
As the name suggests, the party stood up for the interests of entrepreneurs. Their views were therefore mainly in line with this:

- VAT reduction to 19%
- Reduce fuel taxes by 25 cents
- Continued payment of sick employees from 2 years to 3 months
- Unemployment benefits for self-employed persons and sole proprietorships
- Abolition of deductible for basic care
- Burden reduction for informal caregivers
- Competition from the government towards health insurers
- Involvement from companies in connection with the requirements of internships
- Abolition of the student loan system and the introduction of a performance-related grant
- State pension age back to 65

== Election results ==
=== House of Representatives ===
Election	Votes	%	Seats	+/–
2017	12,570	0.12%	0 / 150	New
