= De Nieuwe Mens =

Dutch political party

- Chairperson: Niraï Melis
- Founder: Lea Manders
- Founded: 11 March 2008
- Dissolved: 27 February 2024
- Ideology: Spiritual left
- Colors: Purple

Website
- ikkiesvoorverbinding.nl

Former logo of the Party for Human and Spirit

De Nieuwe Mens (lit. 'The New Human'), formerly known as the Party for Human and Spirit (Dutch: Partij voor Mens en Spirit, MenS), was a political party in the Netherlands. The party registered with the electoral council in December 2008.

== History ==
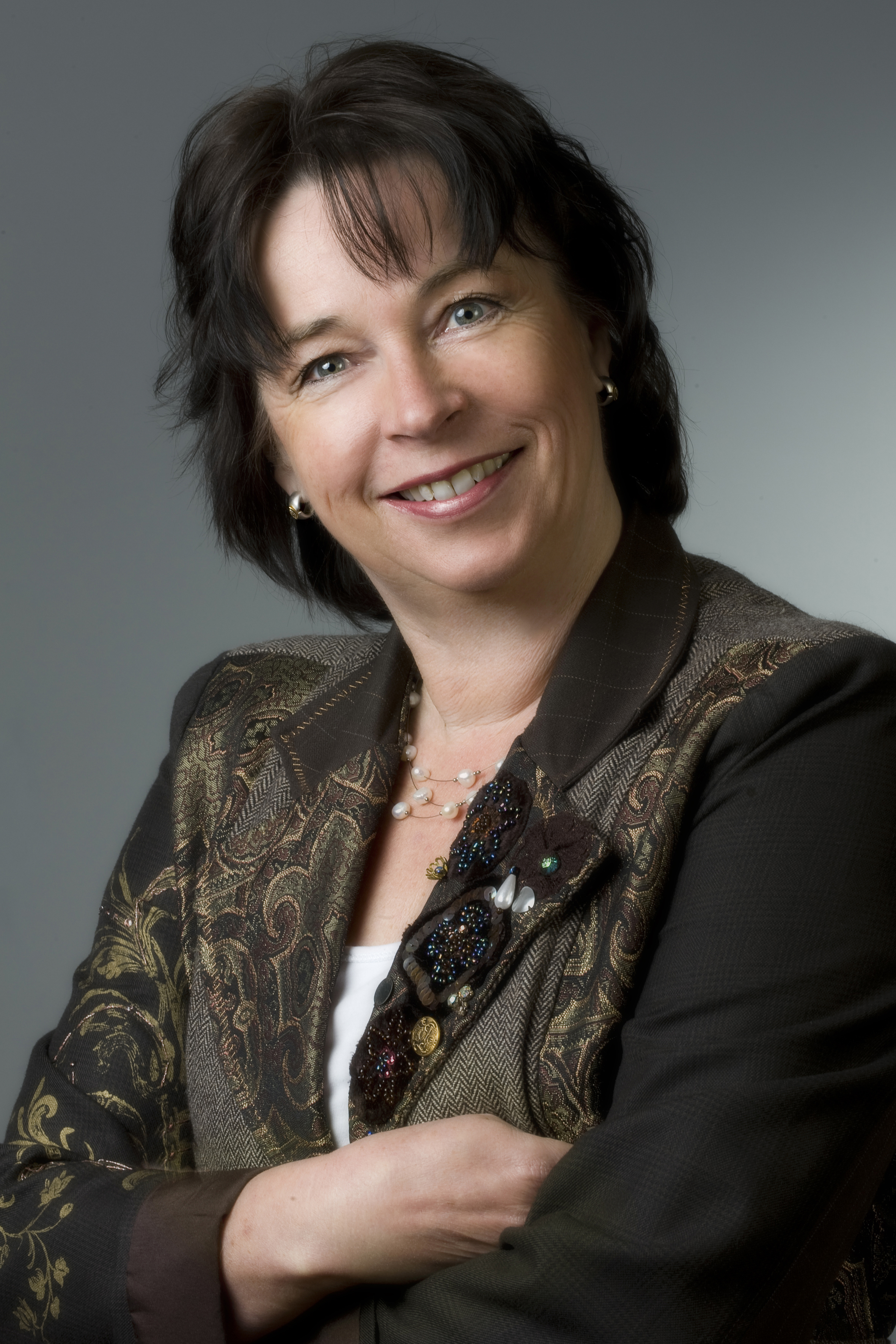
Lea Manders, founder and former leader of the party

The Party for Human and Spirit (MenS) was founded on 11 March 2008 by astrologer Lea Manders. Since 2010, it has taken part in several elections, but it never managed to win any seats.

In the 2017 general election, MenS participated in a combined list with the Basic Income Party (BIP) and the movement Peace and Justice (V&R), with Tara-Joëlle Fonk as lijsttrekker.

=== Name change ===
In September 2020, the name of the party was changed to De Nieuwe Mens. The party had intended to take part in the 2021 general election, but ultimately did not submit the required documents to the Electoral Council.

== Election results ==
=== General elections ===
Election year	House of Representatives			
Election year	Votes	%	# of overall seats won	+/−
2010	26,196	0.28	0 / 150	New
2012	18,310	0.19	0 / 150	0
2017	726	0.01	0 / 150	0

=== Provincial elections ===
Election year	States Provincial				
Election year	Province	Votes	%	# of overall seats won	+/−
2011	Gelderland	2,681	0.30	0 / 55	New
2015	Gelderland	2,481	0.32	0 / 55	0
2015	Groningen	828	0.34	0 / 43	New

=== Municipal elections ===
Election year	Municipal council				
Election year	Municipality	Votes	%	# of overall seats won	+/−
2010	Amsterdam	1,009	0.3	0 / 45	New
2010	Eindhoven	360	0.5	0 / 45	New
2014	Alkmaar	366	1.01	0 / 39	New

== See also ==
- Die Violetten
