= Jacques Monasch =

Dutch politician (born 1962)

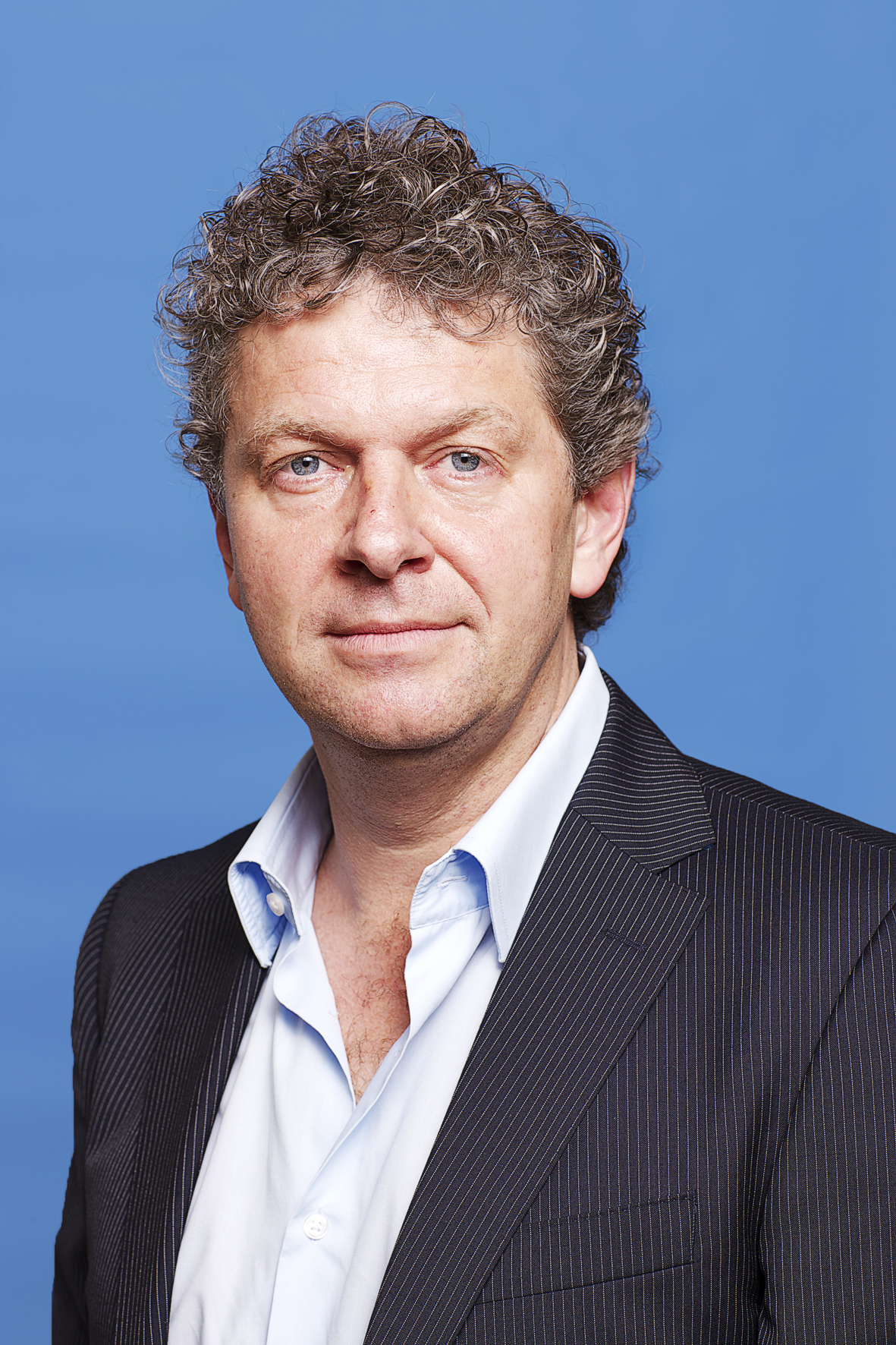
- Jacques Monasch in 2011

Member of the House of Representatives
- In office 17 June 2010 – 23 March 2017

Personal details
- Born: Jacques Simon Monasch; 4 January 1962 (age 64) Rotterdam, Netherlands
- Party: Labour Party (1986–2016)
- Education: University of Groningen; University of Essex

Jacques Simon Monasch (born 4 January 1962) is a Dutch politician, art collector and former management as well as political consultant and civil servant. He was a member of the House of Representatives between 17 June 2010 and 23 March 2017, where he focused on matters of housing and spatial planning. He was a member of the Labour Party from 1986 to 2016. Due to Monasch leaving the Labour Party, the Second Rutte cabinet lost its majority in the House of Representatives. Several weeks after leaving the Labour Party Monasch announced he would enter the 2017 general election with his new party, Nieuwe Wegen. His party did not obtain any seats in the election.

Monasch studied public administration at the University of Groningen and political economy at the University of Essex. He owns a gallery of Russian art.

== Family ==
A grandfather of Jacques Monasch was Jewish; this grandfather was active in the textile business.
