= Political Party for Basic Income =

Dutch political party

Political Party for Basic Income Politieke Partij voor Basisinkomen
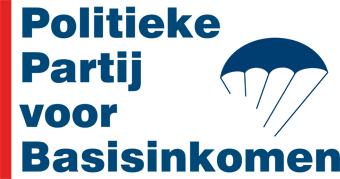
- Abbreviation: PPvB
- Leader: Sepp Hannen
- Chairperson: Eric Binsbergen
- Founded: 4 October 2013
- Headquarters: Reitzstraat 167, Amsterdam
- Ideology: Universal basic income Direct democracy

Website
- basisinkomenpartij.nl

The Political Party for Basic Income (Dutch: Politieke Partij voor Basisinkomen, PPvB), formerly known as the Basic Income Party (Dutch: Basisinkomen Partij, BIP) and De Basis, is a minor political party in the Netherlands, which advocates for the implementation of a universal basic income. The party registered with the electoral council on 9 December 2013.

== History ==
Former logo (2020–2023)

The Basic Income Party was founded on 4 October 2013. In 2014, the party participated in the municipal elections in Amsterdam, Bergen, Deventer, and Utrecht. It also planned to participate in Almere and Groningen, but pulled back two months before the election due to a lack of preparation time. The party did not win any seats.

In 2017, the party participated in the general election as part of a combined list – known as the "umbrella list" – with the Party for Human and Spirit, the Party for Children's Interests and the political movement Peace & Justice. It only participated in the seventh and eighth electoral districts (Utrecht and Arnhem). The list did not receive enough votes for a seat in the House of Representatives.

In 2018, the party took part in the municipal elections once again. This time it only participated in the municipality of Amsterdam. Despite an initiative to join forces with other minor parties, the Basic Income Party failed to win a seat in the municipal council.

In July 2020, Citizen Interests Netherlands (Dutch: Burger Belangen Nederland) merged into the party, and the name was changed to De Basis. The party had intended to take part in the 2021 general election, but ultimately did not submit the required documents to the Electoral Council.

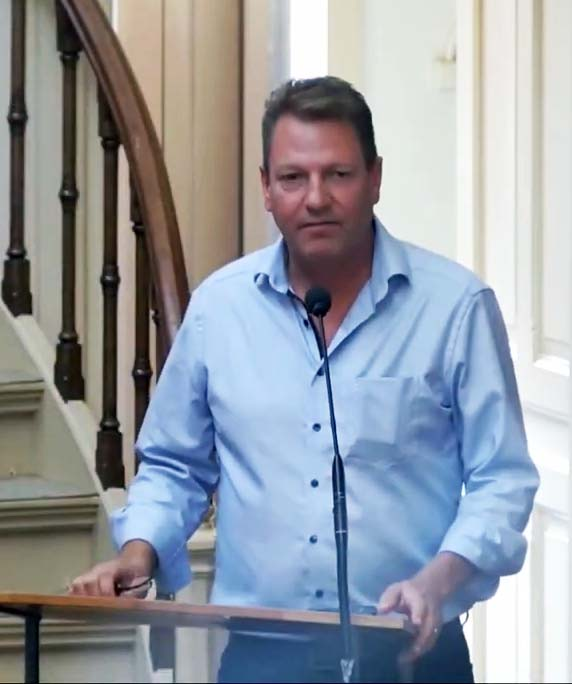
Sepp Hannen, 2023

In 2023, the name of the party was changed once again to 'Political Party for Basic Income'. The party has announced its intent to participate in the 2023 general election with Sepp Hannen as its lead candidate.

== Election results ==
=== General elections ===
Election year	House of Representatives			
Election year	Votes	%	# of overall seats won	+/−
2017	726	0.01	0 / 150	New
2023	1,038	0.01	0 / 150	Steady

=== Municipal elections ===
Election year	Municipal council				
Election year	Municipality	Votes	%	# of overall seats won	+/−
2014	Amsterdam	602	0.19	0 / 45	New
2014	Bergen	93	0.62	0 / 21	New
2014	Deventer	294	0.7	0 / 37	New
2014	Utrecht	456	0.33	0 / 45	New
2018	Amsterdam	635	0.18	0 / 45	0

== See also ==
- Universal basic income in the Netherlands
