= Universal basic income in the Netherlands =

The issue of the universal basic income gained prominence on the political agenda in Netherlands between the mid-1970s and mid-1990s but it has disappeared from the political agenda over the last fifteen years.

== History ==
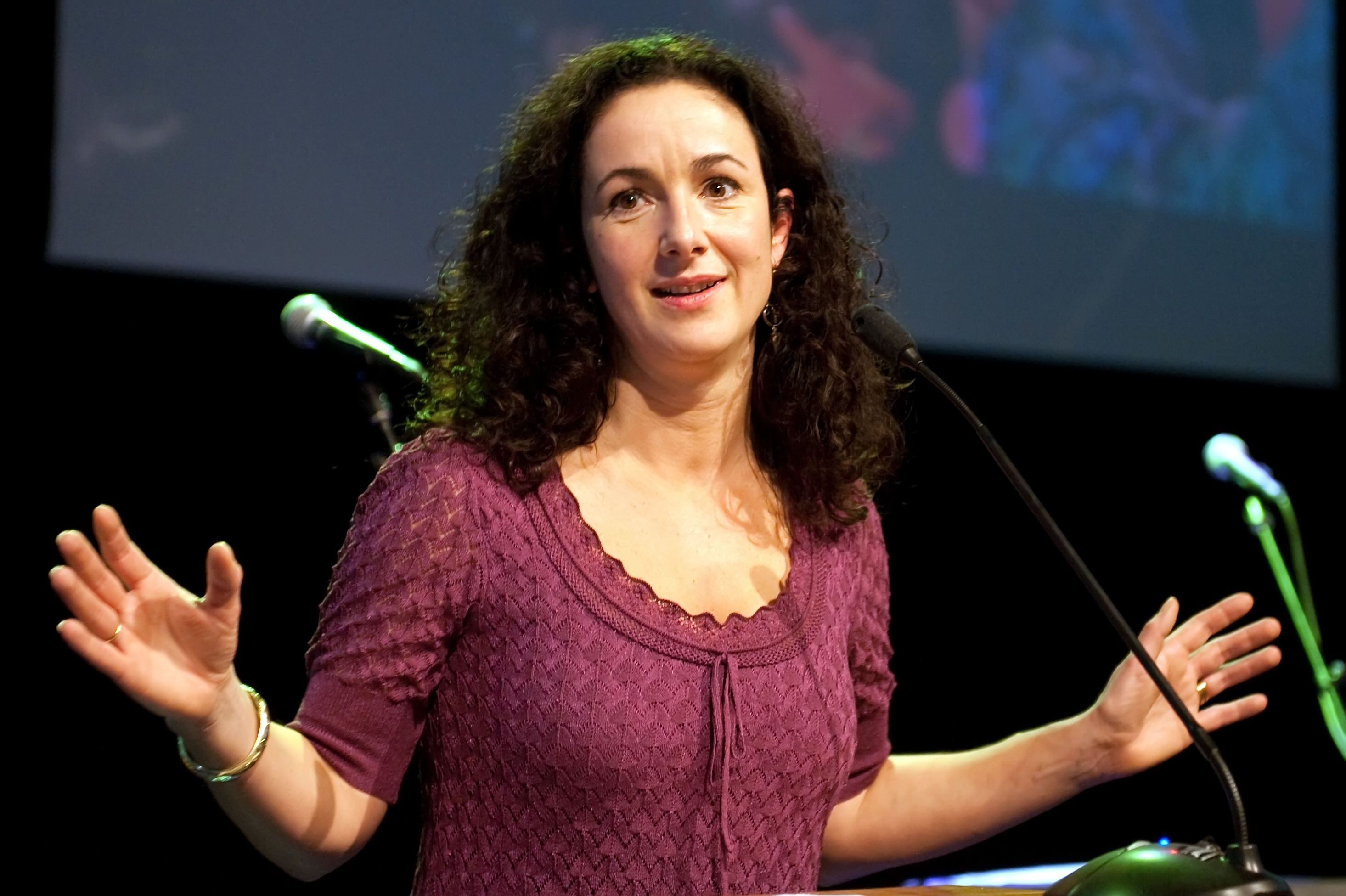
Femke Halsema in 2010

The political discussion on basic income was initiated in 1975 by Leo Jansen, an MP for the progressive Christian Political Party of Radicals (PPR) and Vrije Universiteit professor J. P. Kuiper. In 1977 the issue had been incorporated in the election manifestos of the PPR. The idea was also endorsed by several smaller trade unions of the Federation of Dutch Labour Unions.

In 1985, the Scientific Council for Government Policy, an independent think tank of the Dutch government, endorsed a partial basic income. However, the council's proposals were never acted upon. The PPR and the trade unions which favoured the basic income rejected the Council's proposals because the proposed basic income would be too low and implementation would be accompanied by abolition of the minimum wage. The proposal of the Scientific Council broadened, however, the debate and the issue is debated upon in the social-democratic Labour Party, the conservative liberal People's Party for Freedom and Democracy and the progressive liberal Democrats 66, but these parties did not adopt the basic income in their programs. In 1989 the PPR merged into the GreenLeft, with the Pacifist Socialist Party (PSP), the Communist Party of the Netherlands (CPN) and the Evangelical People's Party. In early 1990s the GreenLeft was ambiguous to the idea of a basic income, not endorsing it in its 1989 election manifesto, but debating the issue in several publications.

In 1992 the debate is re-opened by the Bureau for Economic Policy Analysis, an economic advisory body of the government, which like the Scientific Council endorsed a low basic income as part of simplified social security system. By 1995 the basic income was a prominent issue on the Dutch political agenda. The issue continued to be debated by political parties; the Labour Party debated the issue in its 1994 election manifesto but still rejected it. The GreenLeft, however, endorsed a negative income tax in its 1994 election manifesto, which in the long term could be made into a basic income, according to the party. In 1994 D66 minister Hans Wijers publicly favoured the basic income, leading to negative reactions by his colleagues in cabinet. D66 endorsed his position in 1995, but did not incorporate it in its 1998 election manifesto.

After the success of the first cabinet-Kok to implement its agenda of "work, work, work" and increase the levels of employment the debate about the basic income lost attention and momentum. A welfare state policy oriented at the activation of the unemployed became accepted by nearly all parties.

In 2006, Femke Halsema, leader of the GreenLeft, endorsed a partial basic income and her ideas were taken over in the party's 2006 election manifesto.

In 2013, the Political Party for Basic Income was founded. It has universal basic income as their main focus.

In 2017, the city of Utrecht, along with a few surrounding cities, initiated a basic income experiment with the participation of 250 recipients. The experiment was designed as a randomized controlled trial to test the effectiveness of different methods of delivering financial assistance. Under the trial, some recipients were given the money unconditionally, while others were required to engage in volunteer work. The amount of money provided was approximately $1,050 per month.

== Academic background ==
A prominent Dutch academic in the academic debate on the basic income is Robert Jan van der Veen, who also participated in the September group of Philippe van Parijs.

== See also ==
- Political Party for Basic Income
