= The Violets (political party) =

The Violets – for spiritual politics Die Violetten – für spirituelle Politik
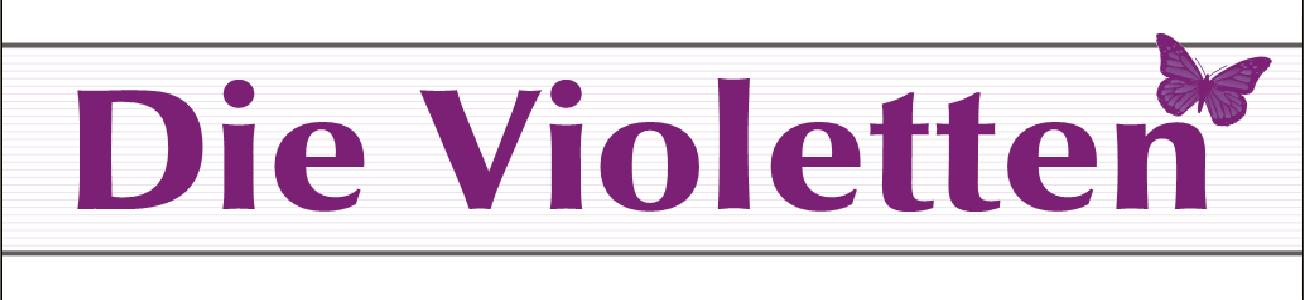
- Spokesperson: Irene Garcia Garcia, Michael Bentele
- General secretary: Rainer Schäfer
- Founded: 6 January 2001; 25 years ago
- Headquarters: Ursulastraße 7; 46049 Oberhausen
- Membership (2013): 704
- Ideology: Spiritual politics Direct democracy Environmentalism
- Bundestag: 0 / 709
- European Parliament: 0 / 96

Website
- die-violetten.de

The Violets – for spiritual politics (German: Die Violetten – für spirituelle Politik) is a political party in Germany.

== History ==
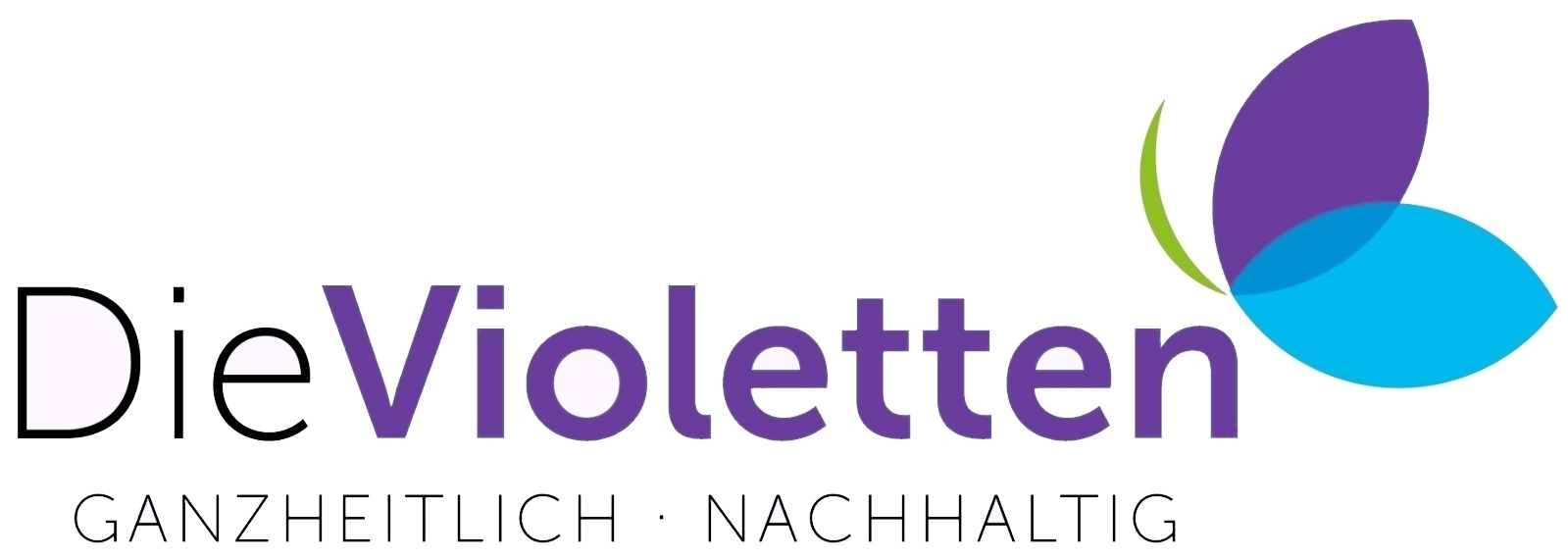
Old logo (before 2020)

The party was founded on 6 January 2001 in Dortmund.

== Organisation ==
The party tries to form a dual leadership of a man and a woman at federal and state level. The Violets have three state branches: in Bavaria, North Rhine-Westphalia, and Schleswig-Holstein.

== Ideology ==
The members of the party see themselves as representatives of spiritual people. Accordingly, the "spirituality" occupies a central place in the party's views. In terms of content, it focuses on domestic issues, particularly in the areas of education, upbringing, business, finance, work and the environment.

Nature conservation is one of the focal points. The party also rejects animal experiments and advocates forms of direct democracy. The violets also demand an unconditional basic income. The main goal, according to the party, is to develop a society in which "everyone can think, feel and act from their level of consciousness and develop to a higher level of consciousness". The Violets also advocate the legalization of illegal drugs while strengthening education and addiction prevention and justify this with a right to self-determination.

== See also ==
- De Nieuwe Mens
