= Florens van der Spek =

Dutch politician

Leader of Jezus Leeft
- Incumbent
- Assumed office November 2013
- Preceded by: Office Established

Personal details
- Party: Jezus Leeft
- Occupation: gardener, evangelist

Florens van der Spek (born 1992) is a Dutch politician. He is leader of the political party Jesus Lives (Dutch: Jezus Leeft). His father in law, Joop van Ooijen, is the founder of the party.

Van der Spek lives on his father-in-law's farm. During his youth, he was a cocaine addict as well as an alcoholic. Now his party campaigns to outlaw all drugs. When he went to church, he would leave early to visit the pub where he took drugs and drank alcohol, also being frequently involved in fights. When asked about what he would do if he became minister-president he described himself as unfit as his strict interpretation of the Bible wouldn't allow him to make the necessary concessions. He went as far as to say that his party would not cooperate with parties that "oppose the principles of Jesus" at all. He is of the opinion that every problem can be solved by "doing them with Jesus", traffic jams being the exception. He also was a candidate for the European Election.

Van der Spek works at a gardening company called Scheppingsonderhoud.

When his party won zero seats in the election, Van der Spek remarked that meant he didn't have to make a compromise with other politicians and that was the only true victory, as his goal is not to win elections but to share Jesus' message in aims to "save the Netherlands from diseases and problems".

Florens van der Spek lives in Giessenburg.
