= San Fernando City Hall =

City hall in Pampanga, Philippines

Coordinates: 15°01′40″N 120°41′38″E

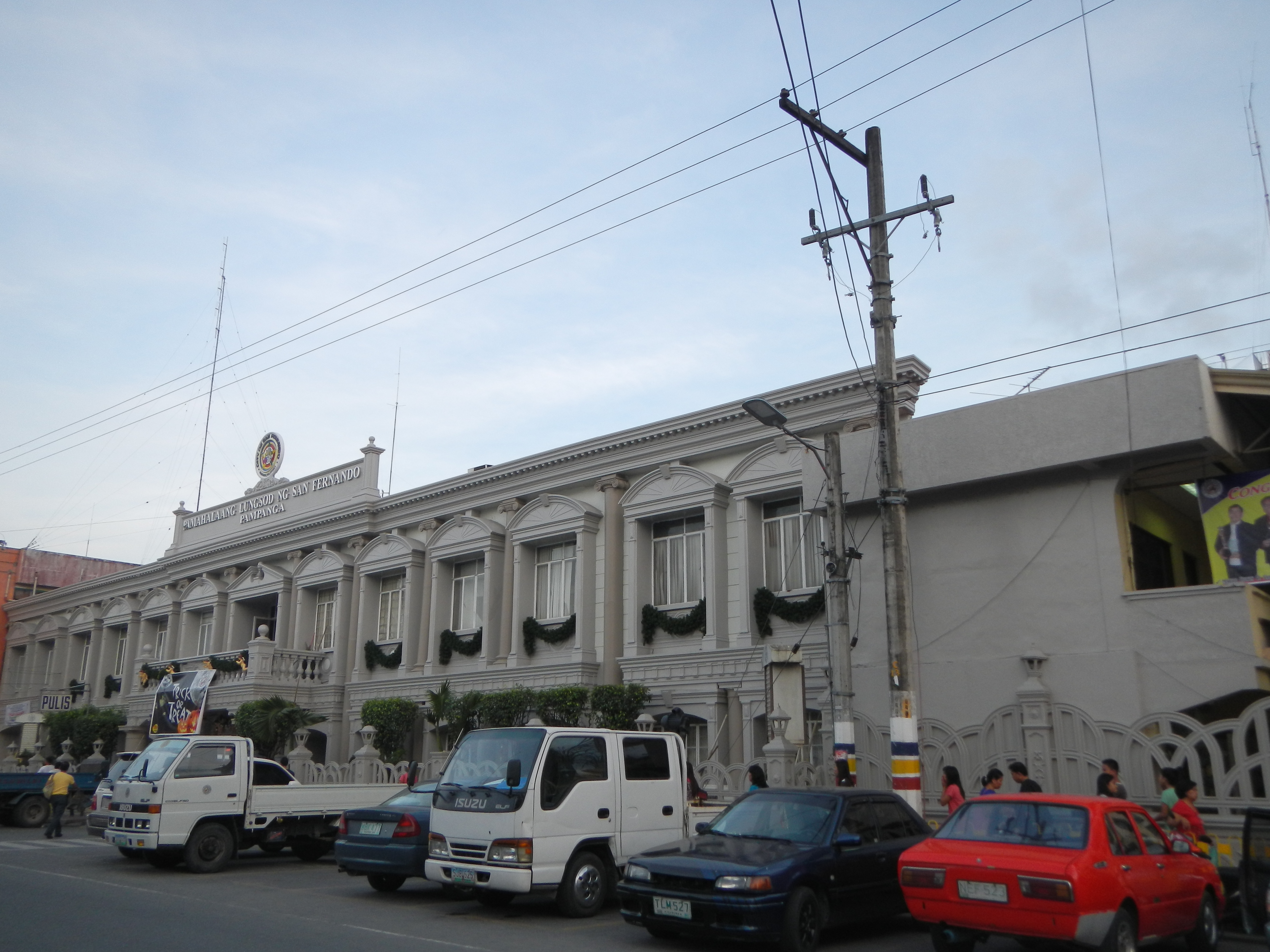
Façade of the City Hall

The City Hall of San Fernando, Pampanga, commonly referred to as Municipio de San Fernando, is a heritage building of the City of San Fernando, Pampanga province, Philippines.

== History ==
The first municipal hall was built in the present site in 1755 out of stone and thatch. It was burned by the Philippine Revolutionary Army on the orders of Gen. Antonio Luna, on May 4, 1899. The building was reconstructed in 1917, during the term of the municipal president Antonio Abad Santos and under the supervision of the district engineer EJ Halsema (March 12, 1882 – March 15, 1945), replacing the 1874 building burned by Luna. Again burned during the Japanese invasion of the town, the municipal government was temporarily transferred to the residence of Vivencio Cuyugan in Barrio Del Pilar. After the war, the present City Hall of San Fernando was reconstructed using the original adobe stonework.

The Capsule-marker was laid on January 3, 2000, at the entrance of the Municipio. San Fernando became the 99th City of the Republic of the Philippines on February 4, 2001, by virtue of Republic Act 8990. The City of San Fernando prides itself as the home of numerous personages in Philippine history, among whom include socialist leader and assemblyman Pedro Abad Santos, war hero and former chief justice Jose Abad Santos, revolutionary heroine Nicolasa P. Dayrit, poet and legislator Zoilo S. Hilario, senator and father of the concrete pavement Sotero J. Baluyut, revolutionary governor Tiburcio T. Hilario, and celebrated prewar journalist Amando G. Dayrit.

The Municipio was restored in 2003 by Mayor Rey B. Aquino.

== Gallery ==
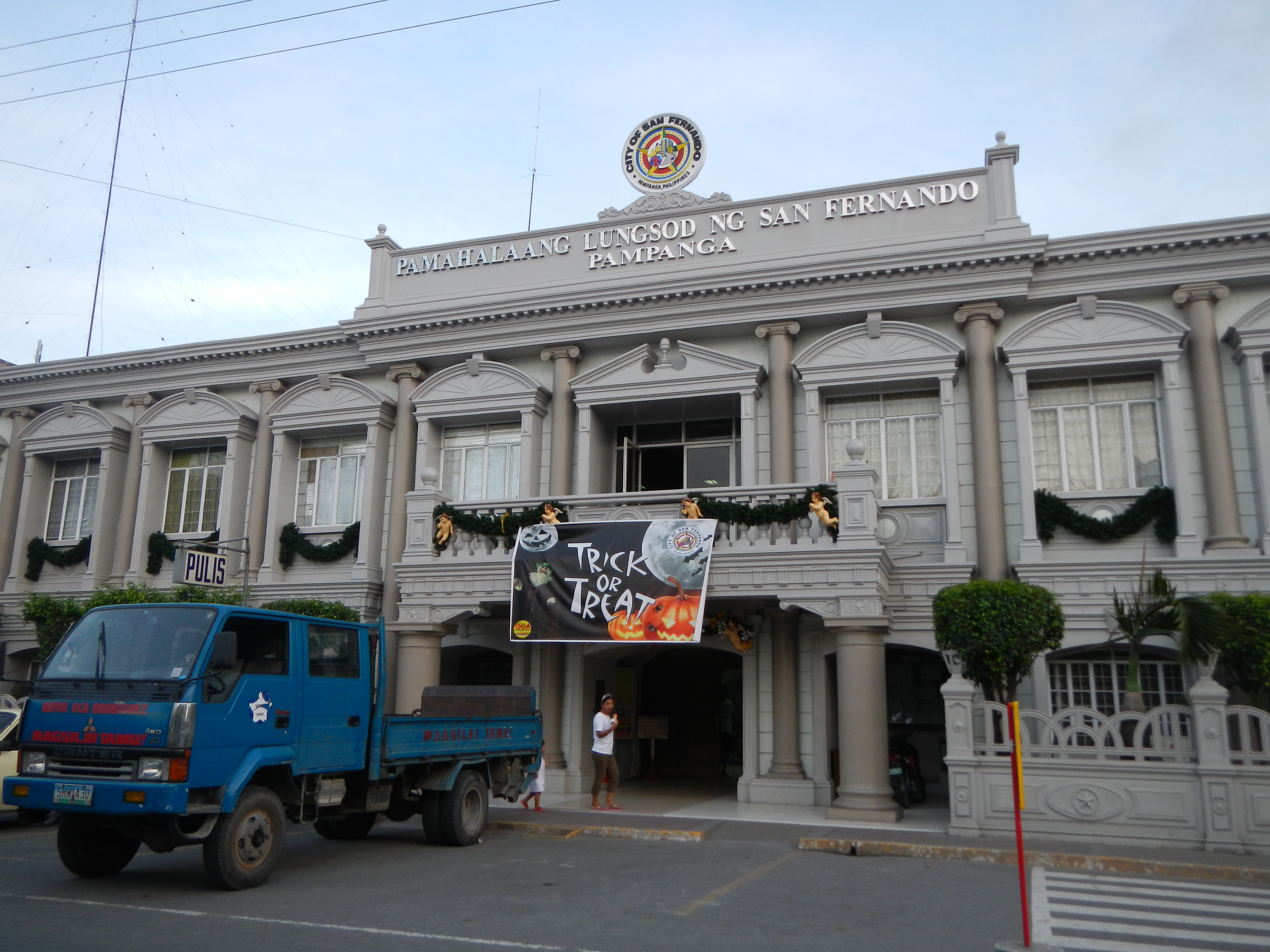
Municipio de San Fernando

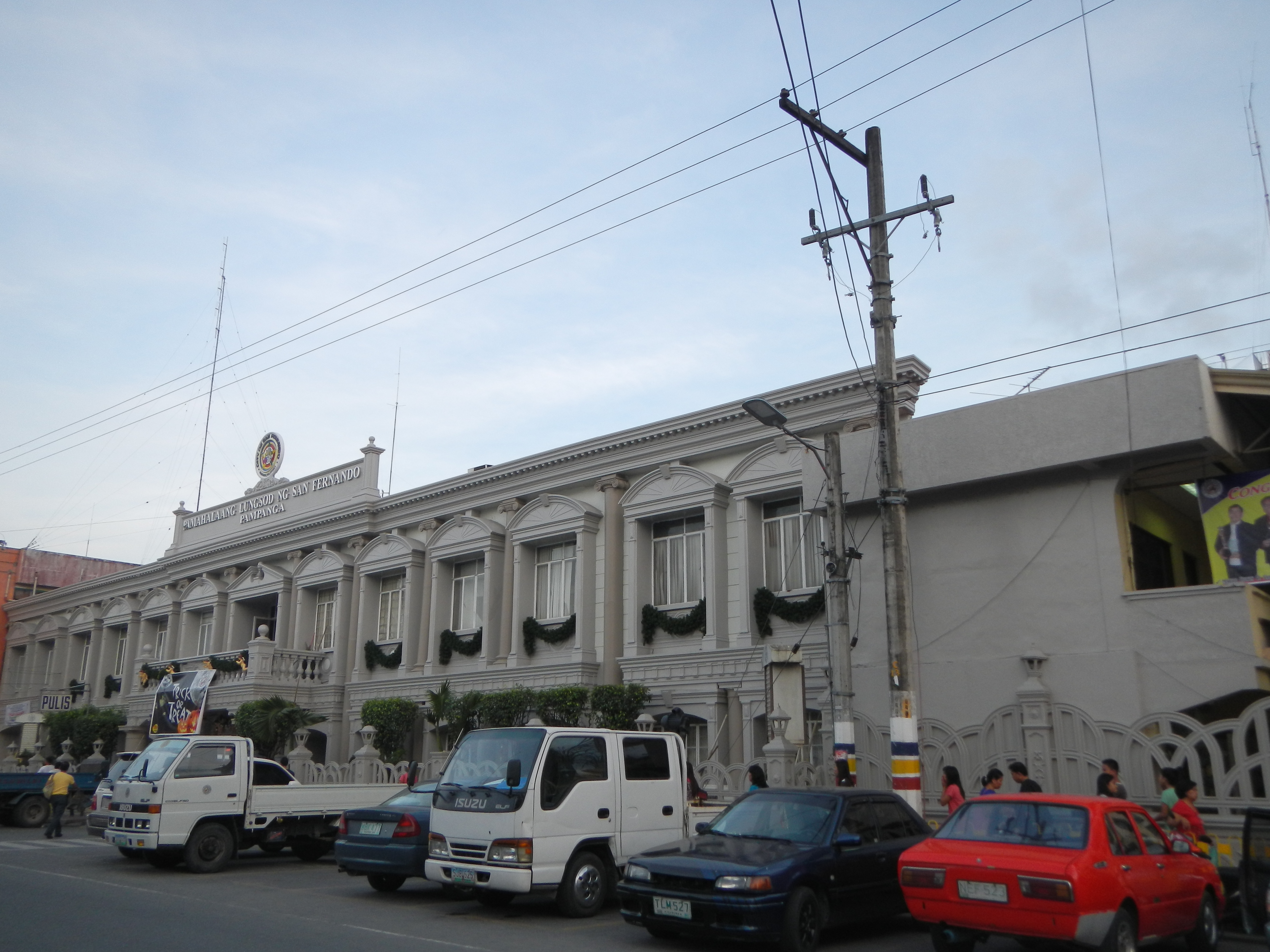
Façade of Municipio de San Fernando

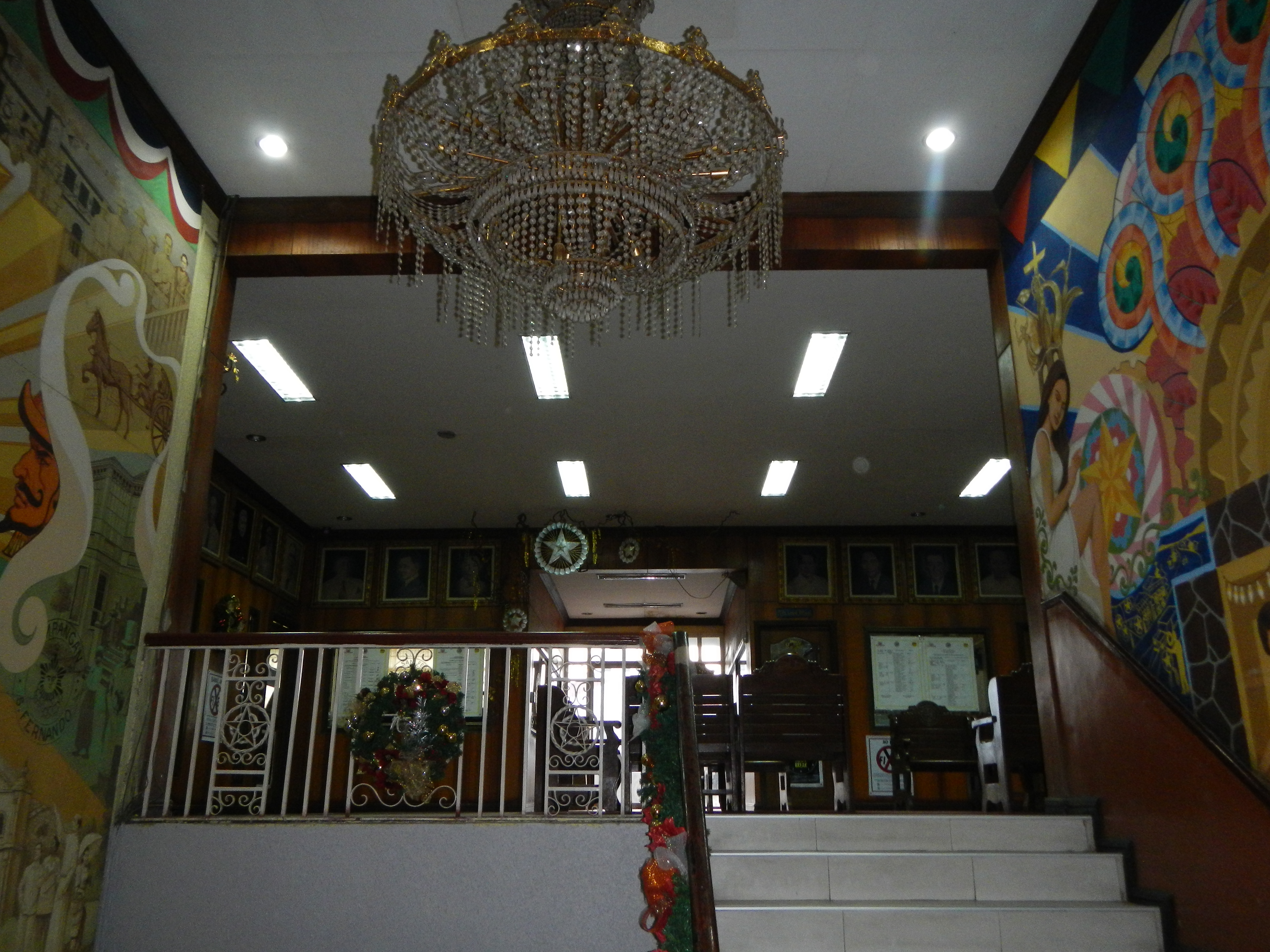
View of the second floor from the stairs

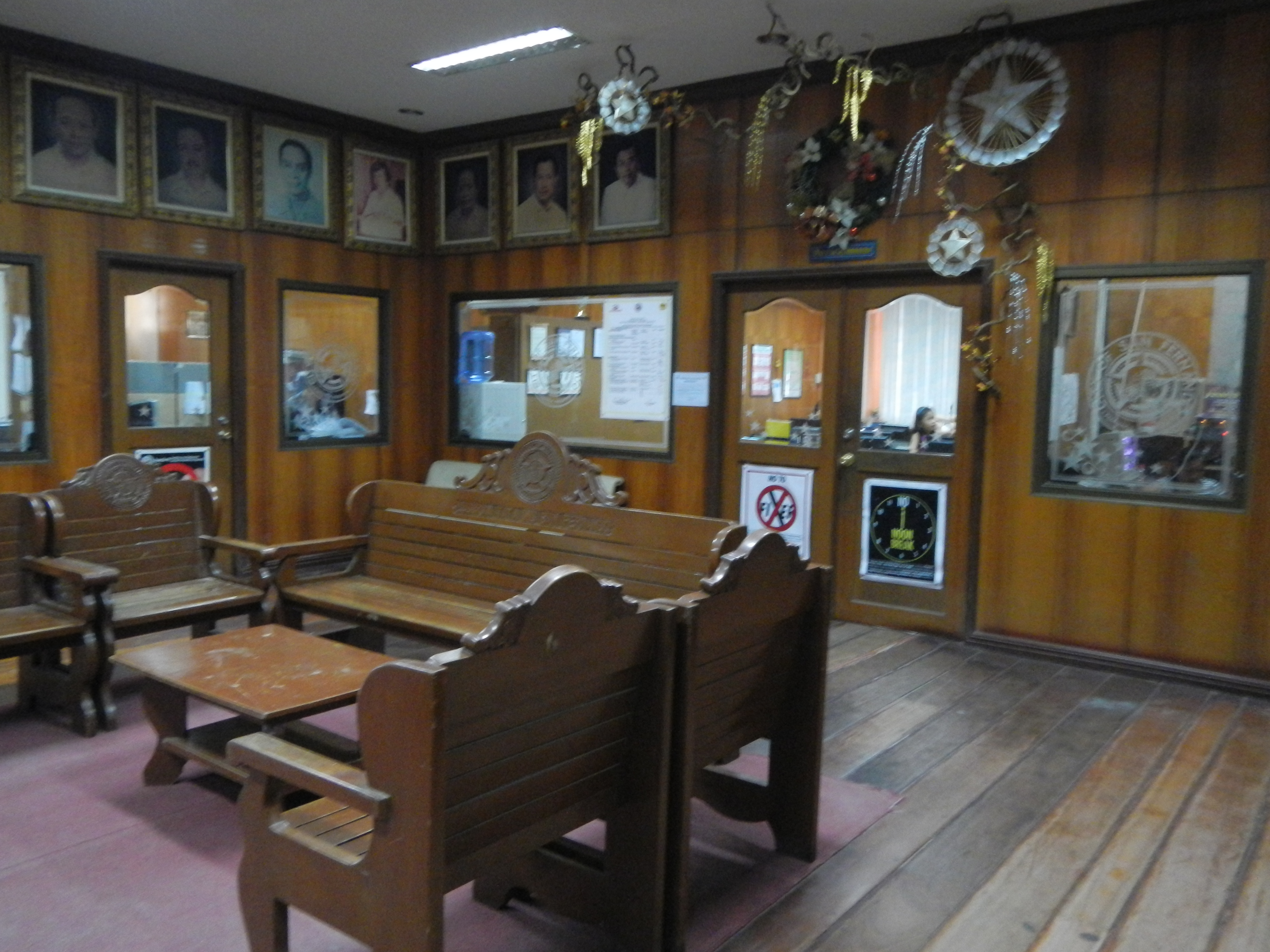
Second floor

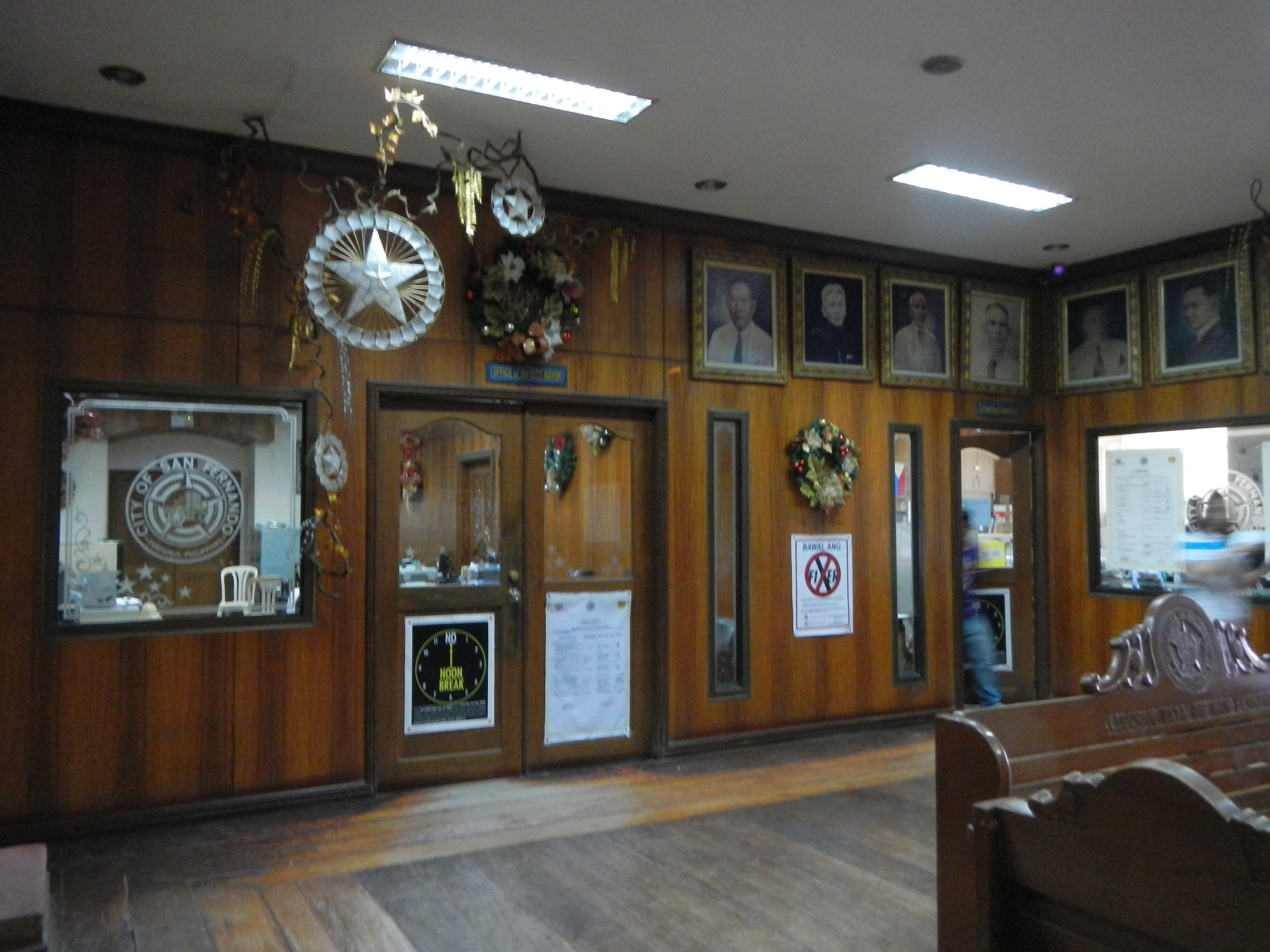
Mayor's Office

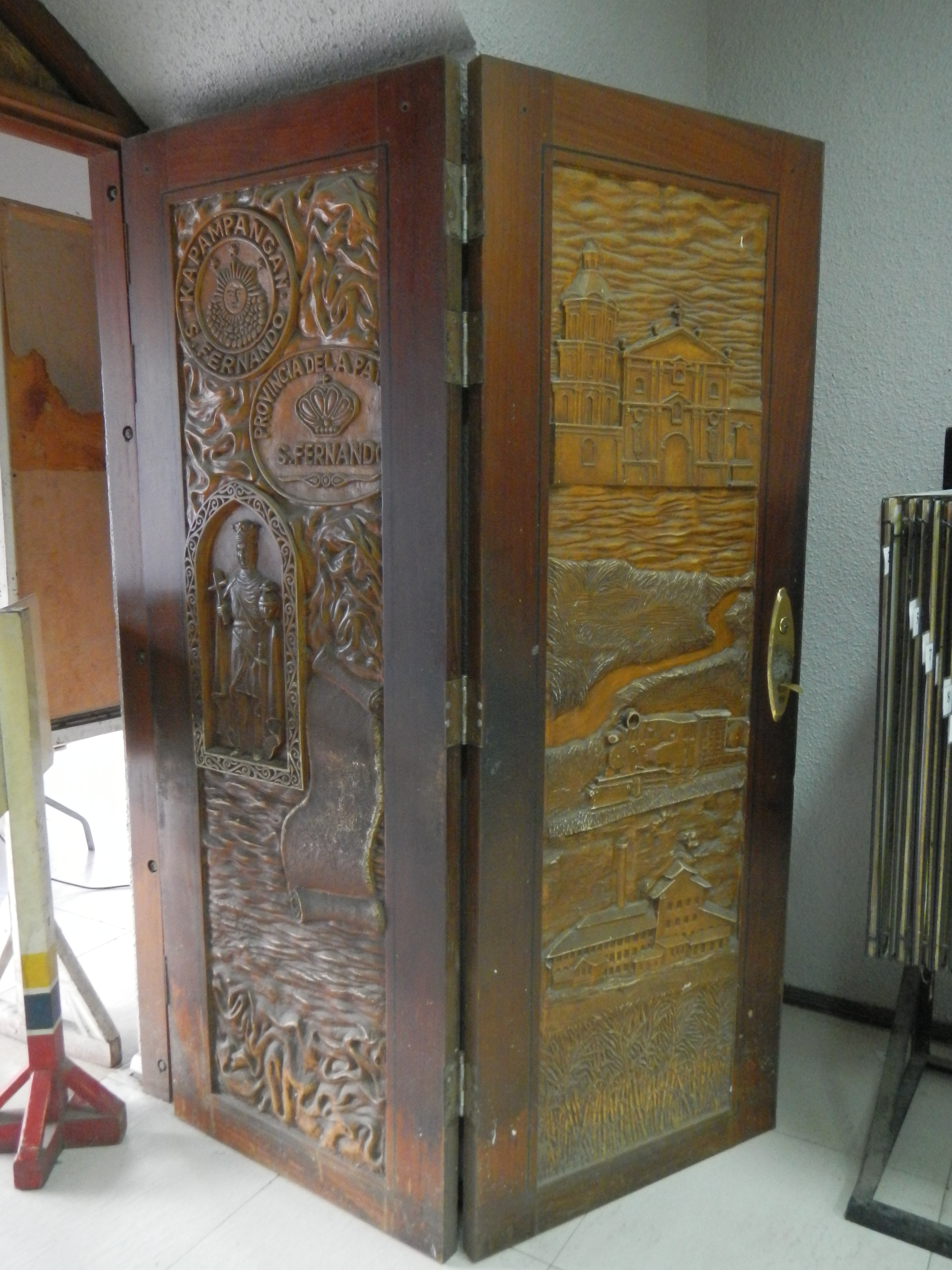
Main door (half)

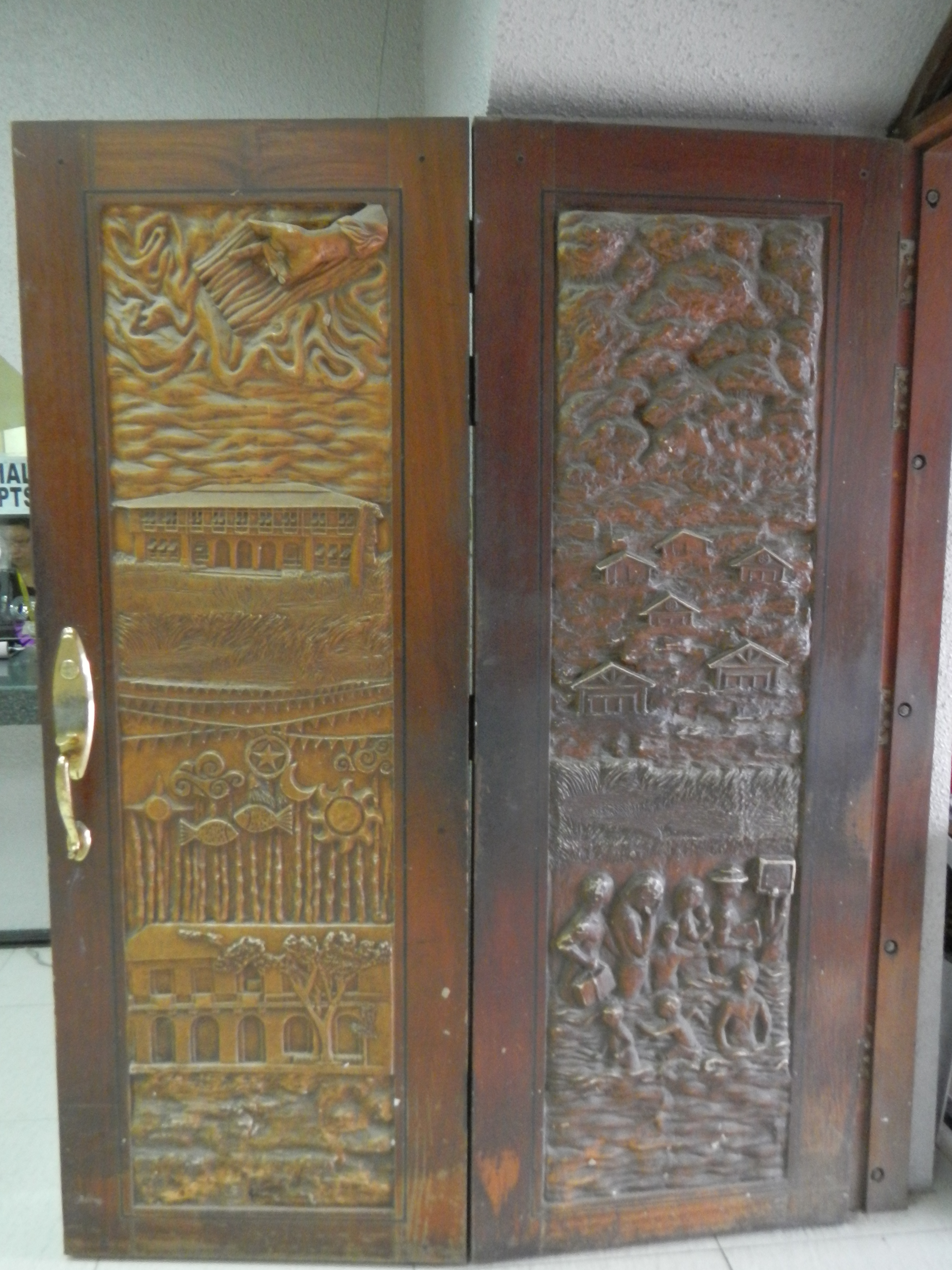
The other half

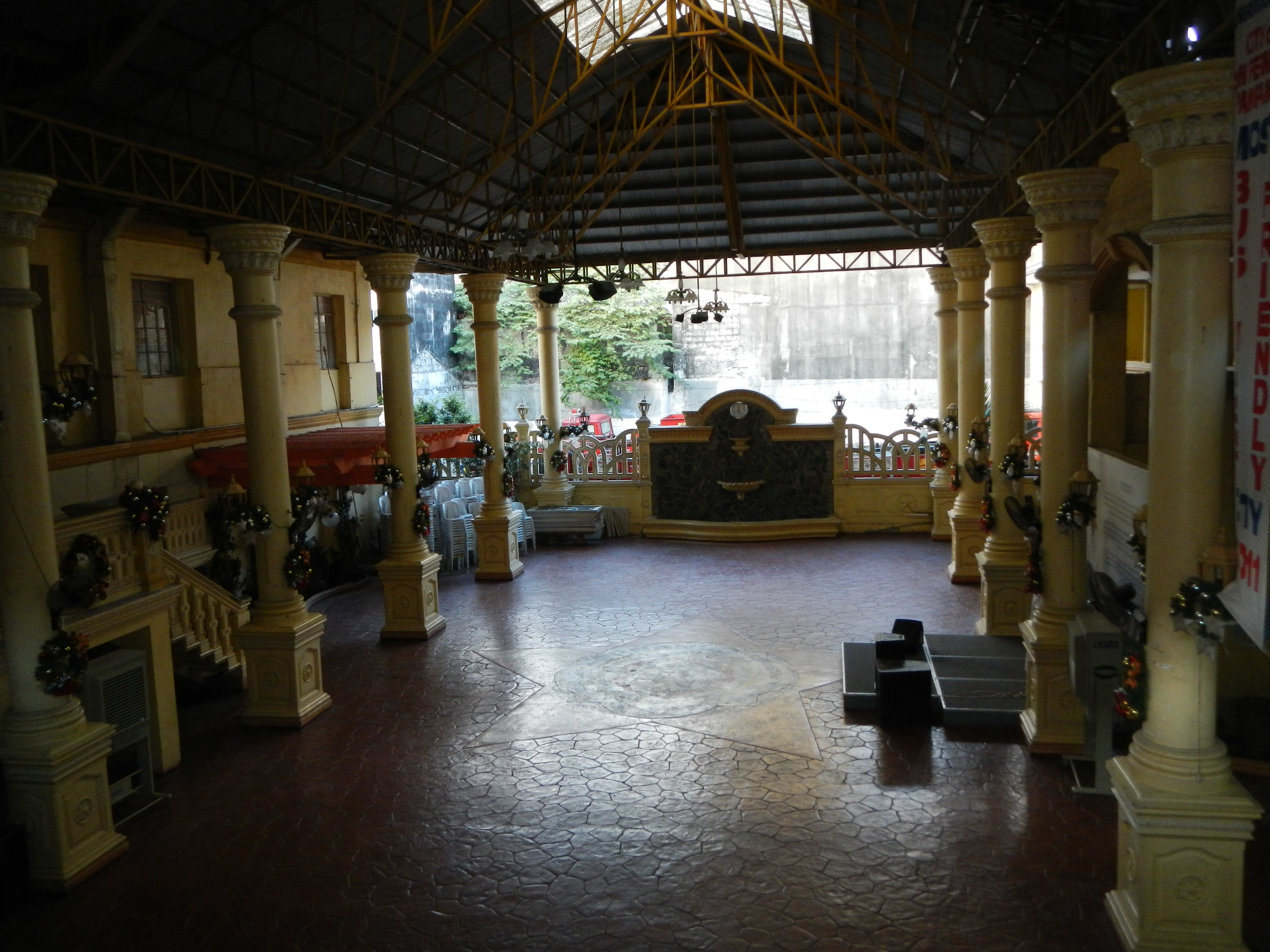
Ground floor

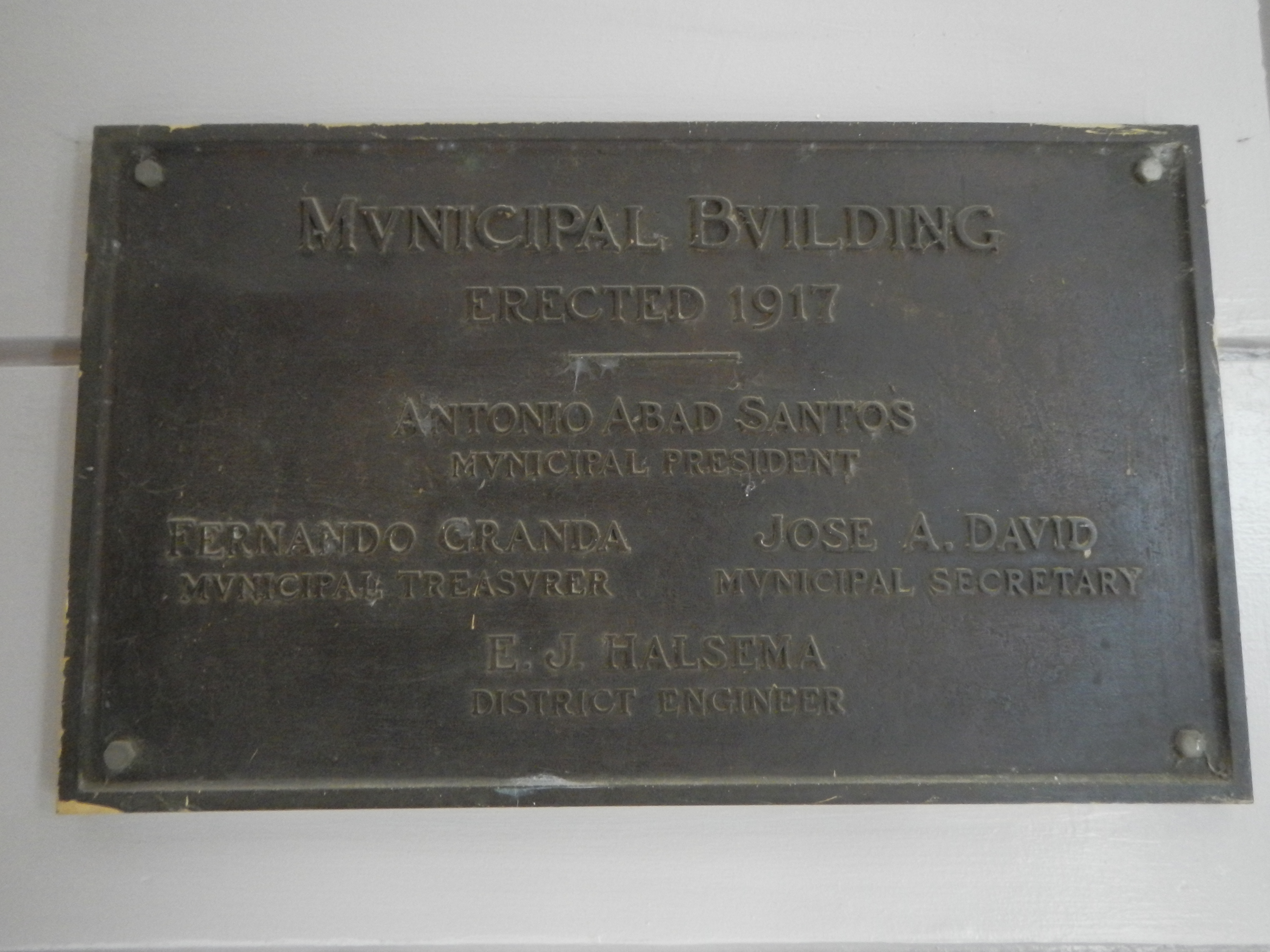
1917 Marker

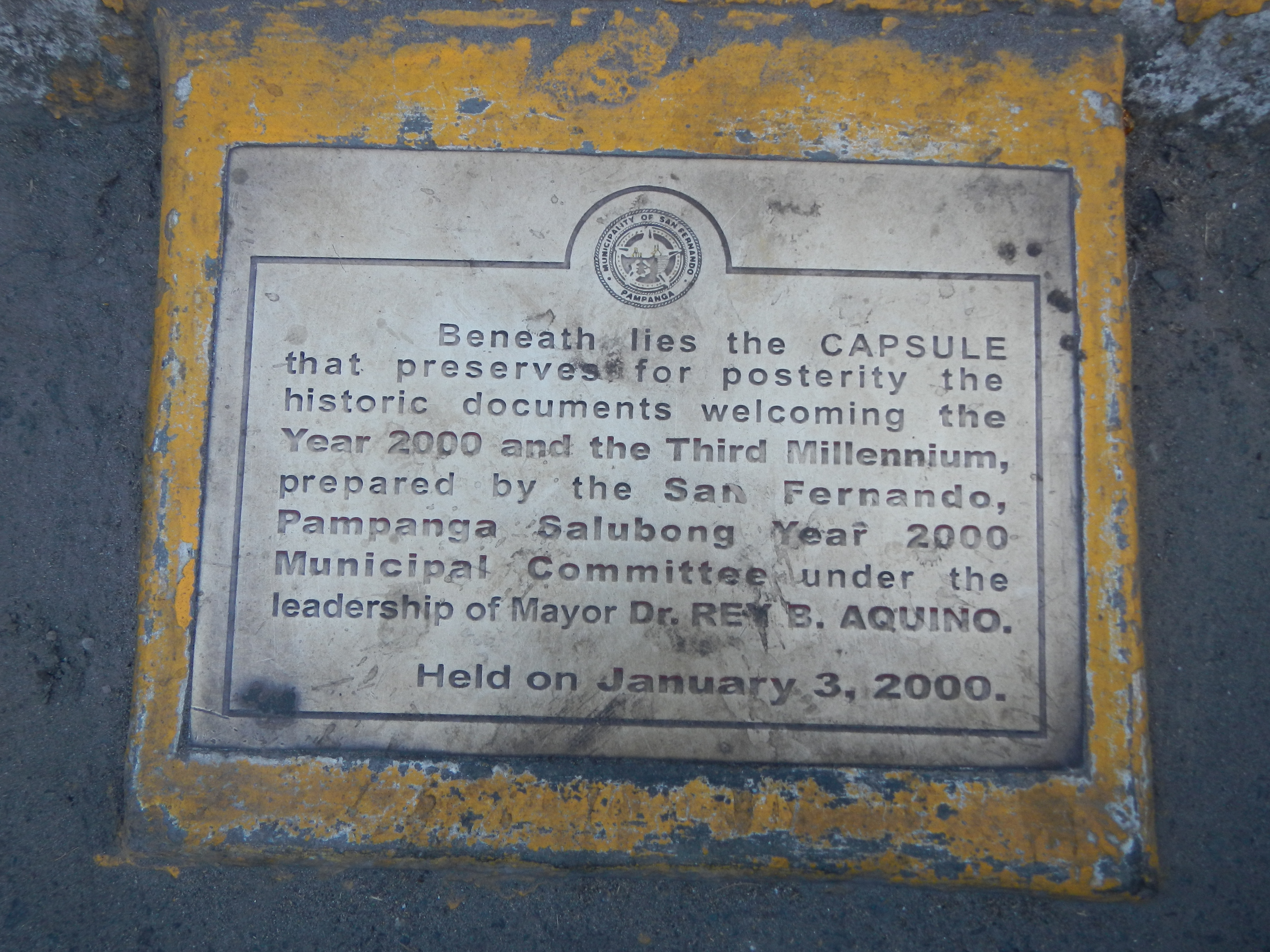
Capsule-marker (January 3, 2000)

Heroes Hall, an extension of the city hall.
