= Femke Halsema =

Dutch politician and filmmaker

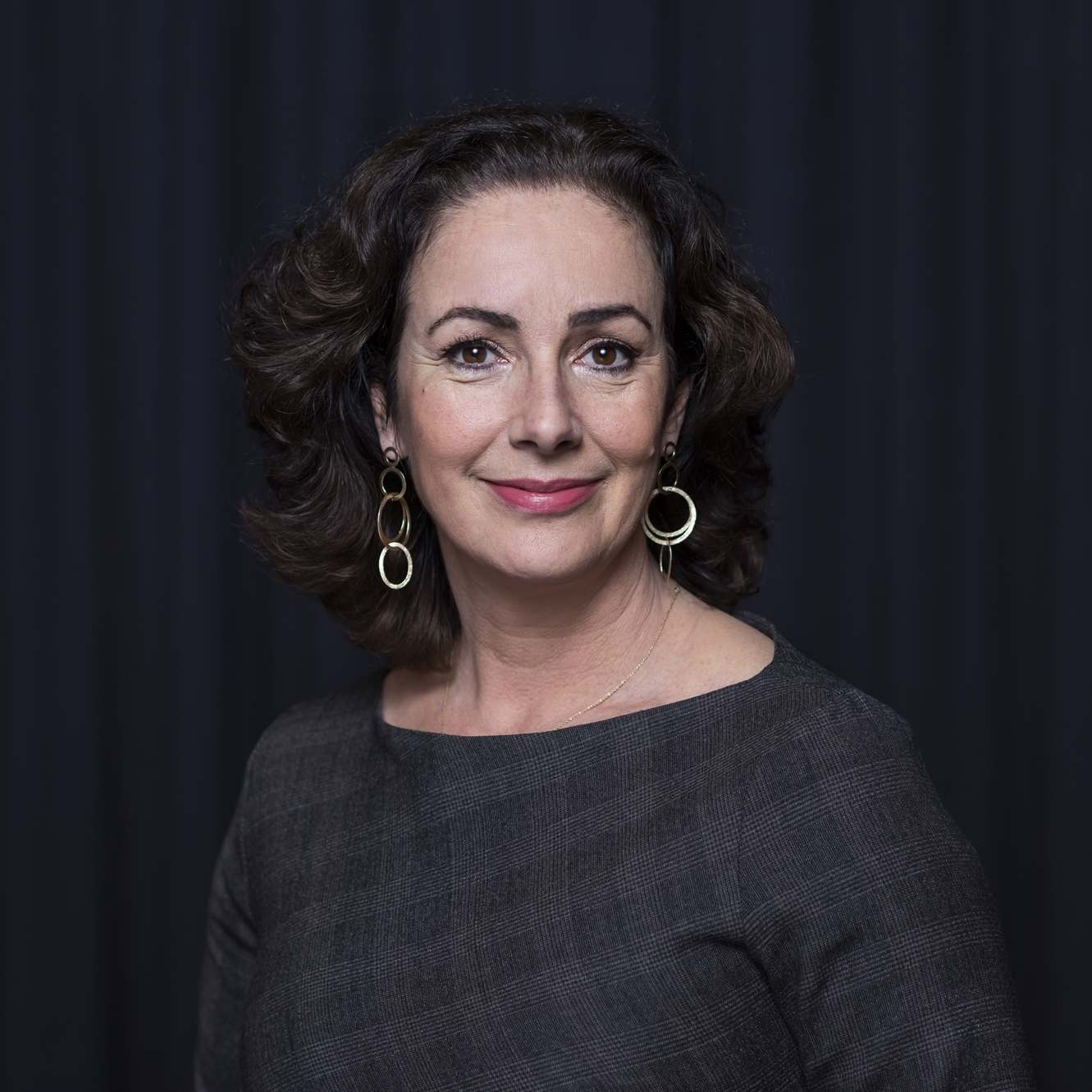
- Halsema in 2018

Mayor of Amsterdam
- Incumbent
- Assumed office 12 July 2018
- Preceded by: Jozias van Aartsen

Leader of GroenLinks in the House of Representatives
- In office 26 November 2002 – 16 December 2010
- Preceded by: Paul Rosenmöller
- Succeeded by: Jolande Sap

Member of the House of Representatives
- In office 19 May 1998 – 12 January 2011

Personal details
- Born: 25 April 1966 (age 60) Haarlem, Netherlands
- Party: Progressief Nederland (since 2026)
- Other political affiliations: GroenLinks (1998–2026)
- Spouse: Robert Oey (2002–2021)
- Children: 2
- Education: Utrecht University
- Website: Official website
- Femke Halsema's voice

Femke Halsema (Dutch: [ˈfɛmkə ˈɦɑlsəmaː]; born 25 April 1966) is a Dutch politician and filmmaker serving as Mayor of Amsterdam since 2018. She is the first woman to hold the position on a non-interim basis. She was previously a member of the House of Representatives for the leftist green party, GroenLinks (1998–2011), and served as the party's parliamentary leader (2002–2010).

== Early life ==
=== Family background ===
Halsema was born in 1966 in Haarlem, the Netherlands, into a Dutch social democratic family. The family later moved to Enschede, a town in the eastern Netherlands near the German border in the Twente region. Her father W. Halsema was a sport teacher and served as director of the municipal service for physical education, sport and recreation (Dienst lichamelijke opvoeding, sport en recreatie) in Enschede.

From 1982 to 1994, her mother, Olga Halsema-Fles, served as an alderwoman in Enschede for the Labour Party (PvdA), with responsibility for social affairs and employment. She was also a member of the Dutch Social Insurance Advisory Board (College van Toezicht Sociale Verzekeringen).

=== Religious origin ===
Halsema and her mother are of recent Dutch Reformed Church descent. Halsema's mother Olga Margaretha Bertha Fles was born in 1941 in Velsen-Driehuis near harbour town IJmuiden north of Amsterdam. Olga Fles' parents Cornelis Nicolaas Fles and Truus Corbee married in 1939 in the Noorsche Kerk, Nederlands Hervormd, a Dutch Protestant church in Hilligersberg, near Rotterdam.

In a 2002 interview with the Reformatorisch Dagblad (RD), a Dutch Protestant Christian Reformed newspaper, Halsema presumed members of her maternal family to have been "assimilated Jews", because two nephews of her maternal grandfather Cornelis Nicolaas Fles were named Abram and Izaak, whom she supposed had been tailors. Halsema referred to some families with the surname Fles in the region (Twente) Enschede being Jewish. But Halsema's own family is not related to them.

Olga Halsema-Fles’ family originates from Leiden, with a few ancestors residing in Rotterdam, amongst whom Abram and Izaak Fles, her uncles. Both Abram and Izaak Fles belonged to the Nederlands Hervormde Kerk (Dutch Reformed Church). As such they were registered in the Rotterdam municipal archive. They worked as civil servants, married and died in 1961 in Rotterdam.

Abram, Izaak and Jacob are common first names in Dutch Protestant churches, chosen from the Hebrew Bible, next to New Testament names. Abram and Izaak Fles belonged to the Nederlands Hervormde Kerk (Dutch Reformed Church), just like their father Izaak, a brother to Halsema's great-grandfather Cornelis Fles, and their grandfather was. Halsema's family tree in the maternal line shows, that all ancestors in this family Fles since the start of the 18th century were baptised in Leiden, a historical stronghold of Protestantism in the Netherlands. Before, in the 17th century all ancestors were baptised in Roman Catholic churches as was their first known forefather Johannes Fles (Flessinghe), born ca. 1640 in Sarbrug (Saarbrücken, Germany), who settled in Leiden, in Holland.

Dutch historian Bart Wallet included Femke Halsema in a chapter on contemporary Dutch Jewry in an entirely revised edition (2017) of “Geschiedenis van de joden in Nederland" ("History of the Jews in the Netherlands"). But after some genealogical research in 2020 Wallet published an article in the Dutch Jewish internet magazine Jonet "Waarom Femke Halsema toch niet joods is" ("Why Femke Halsema is not Jewish after all"), admitting his mistake, indicating he will correct this in the next edition of this book. The article was reprinted in the Dutch Nieuw Israëlitisch Weekblad (New Israelitic Weekly).

== Career ==
=== Career before politics ===
In 1983, Halsema graduated from the Kottenpark-college in Enschede with a Havo-diploma. Between 1984 and 1985 she attended the Vrije Hogeschool (teachers program for Waldorf schools) in Driebergen. In 1985 she started training as a Dutch and history teacher in Utrecht. In 1988 she left her training without graduating. After that she worked for a year in a Utrecht café. She then started studying general social sciences at Utrecht University, specialising in criminology. During these studies she had a number of jobs related to her specialisation. Between 1991 and 1993, she was an intern at the working group "police and immigrants" at the Ministry of the Interior and she was a student assistant for professor Frank Bovenkerk.

After Halsema graduated in 1993, she joined the staff of the Wiardi Beckman Stichting (WBS), the research institute of the Labour Party. She was seen as a rising talent in the Labour Party. In 1995, she published the book Ontspoord. Opstellen over criminaliteit & rechtshandhaving ("Derailed, essays about crime and law enforcement") for the WBS. In 1996, she travelled through the United States as a fellow for the German Marshall Fund. In 1996 she became an editor for the De Helling, the magazine of the research institute of GroenLinks. In the same year, she started combining her work at the WBS with work for De Balie, a political and cultural centre in Amsterdam, where she met Kees Vendrik, who before that worked for the GroenLinks in the House of Representatives. For De Balie, she led the project Res Publica about the meaning of the Constitution of the Netherlands for the modern society. She also joined the programme committee of the Labour Party for the 1998 election. She also published the book Land in zicht: een cultuurpolitieke benadering van de Ruimtelijke Ordening ("Land ho, cultural-political essays about spatial planning") with Maarten Hajer. She was asked to be a candidate for the Labour Party in the 1998 election.

In the autumn of 1997, Halsema left the Labour Party and the WBS. The direct cause was the authoritarian way in which the police had handled the protests against the European summit that was working on the Treaty of Amsterdam. The social democratic mayor Schelto Patijn had put 500 people in preventive detention. Her dissatisfaction with the course of the Labour Party had grown. In her view the party was unable to renew its social democratic manifesto and use the rising economic tide to invest in the public sector.

=== Political career ===
==== Member of the House of Representatives ====
In the 1998 election, Halsema was a candidate on the list of GroenLinks after being courted by Paul Rosenmöller. She was the third candidate on the list, making her the highest new candidate and practically guaranteed her a seat in the House. The seventh was her former De Balie-colleague Vendrik. GroenLinks more than doubled its seat total from five to eleven. In her first period in the House, Halsema was spokesperson justice, asylum seekers and home affairs. She became well known due to her opposition to the tougher migration law proposed by Job Cohen.

In the 2002 election, she was given the second place on the list. The party lost one seat. Halsema became vice-chair of the parliamentary party and among others spoke for the party in the first debate with the First Balkenende cabinet. In November of that year Paul Rosenmöller unexpectedly announced that he would leave politics. He asked Halsema to succeed him, and she immediately agreed. Ten days before the party congress she was announced as the only candidate for the party leadership and became top candidate for the 2003 election. The party lost another two seats. In addition to the party leadership she was spokesperson on areas of culture and media, healthcare, spatial planning and the environment. As party leader she had a more prominent position and put forth a number of private member's bills, including one concerning judicial review and another that sets a fixed price for books (together with the leader of the Democrats 66 (D66) Boris Dittrich).

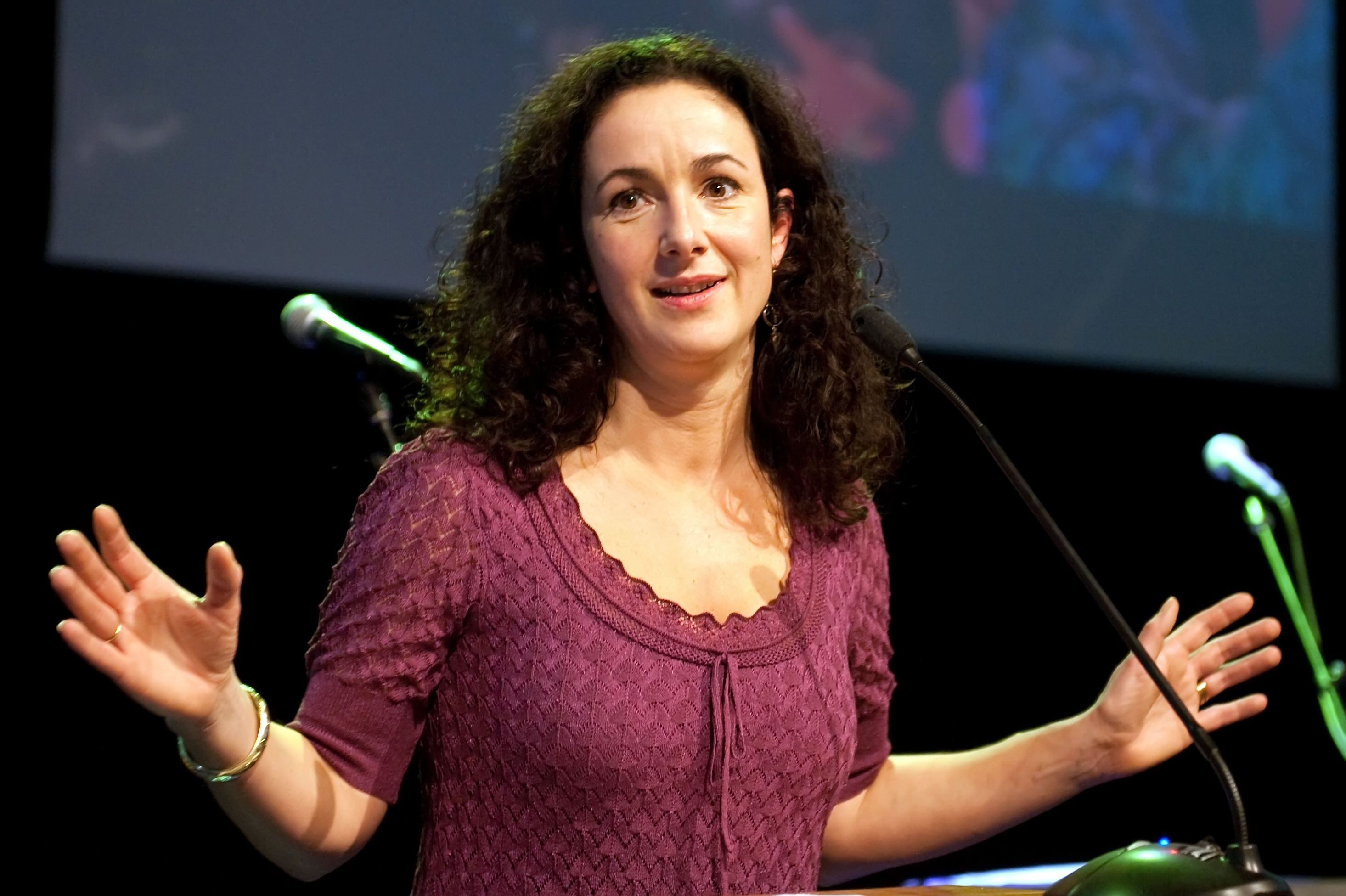
Halsema in 2010

Between October 2003 and January 2004, Halsema was on maternity leave. She got twins. Marijke Vos, the vice-chair of the parliamentary party took over as party leader. After her return to the House of Representatives, Halsema started a debate about the course of the left in general and GroenLinks in particular. She claimed that her party was the last "left liberal party in the Netherlands". She called for increased cooperation with the Socialist Party, the Labour Party and GroenLinks, aiming at a left-wing majority government after the 2007 election. She asked Labour Party leader Wouter Bos to speak out in favour of such a cabinet, but he refused in order to allow for a possible coalition of the Labour Party and the Christian Democratic Appeal. In January 2006, she was elected "Liberal of the Year" by the Youth Organisation Freedom and Democracy, the youth organisation of the People's Party for Freedom and Democracy (VVD), because of her new political course, in particular where it came to reforming the welfare state. In June 2006, she was the only candidate for the top spot on her party's list. During the campaign, she published Linkse lente (Left-wing Spring), a book co-authored by Michiel Zonneveld, which blends her political vision and personal biography. In the 2006 election the party lost another seat.

In 2007, she took over the private member's bill of Wijnand Duyvendak, who worked together with Niesco Dubbelboer of the Labour Party and Boris van der Ham of D66, to allow for a non-binding corrective referendum. In April 2010 the party congress voted against including the referendum in the party manifesto.

In the run-up to the 2010 elections, she was given the Thorbecke prize for political eloquence. and she was elected by Intermediair as the best candidate for Prime Minister.

During the 2010 election, GroenLinks went from seven to ten seats. The party, under Halsema, negotiated with the VVD, the Labour Party and D66 to reach agreement on a new "Purple Plus"-government, but the negotiations failed.

On 17 December 2010, Halsema announced that she would leave parliament and that Jolande Sap was elected as the new leader of GroenLinks. She formally left parliament in January 2011.

In 2016, she made public in her political memoire Pluche (Plush) that after the 2012 election she was asked to consider becoming minister of Development Cooperation by Lodewijk Asscher, the Labour Party leader, but the VVD vetoed this.

==== Mayor of Amsterdam ====
On 27 June 2018, Halsema was appointed Mayor of Amsterdam, beginning a six-year term on 12 July 2018. She is the first woman to hold the position on a full basis; Guusje ter Horst and Kajsa Ollongren had previously served only in an acting capacity (for 14 days in 2001 and 21 days in 2017, respectively). Halsema is also the first member of GreenLeft to become mayor of Amsterdam. In 2024, Halsema was officially reappointed for a second 6-year term.

Protests related to the murder of George Floyd took place on Dam Square in Amsterdam on 1 June 2020. Halsema faced criticism over the large turnout and the difficulty of enforcing the 1.5-meter social distancing rule introduced during the COVID-19 pandemic. Critics, including members of the medical community, argued that insufficient action had been taken to manage the crowd and ensure public health measures were observed. Similar protests were held in Den Haag and Rotterdam, where distancing measures were more strictly enforced. In Rotterdam, a subsequent protest was stopped due to overcrowding, and other demonstrations were cancelled.

On 1 July 2021, Halsema apologised for the city's involvement in the Atlantic slave trade.

In November 2024, Halsema expressed regret over her prior labeling of the November 2024 Amsterdam riots as a "pogrom". Halsema said that the term pogrom is being used as propaganda by Dutch politicians to discriminate against Moroccans and Muslims. Israeli Foreign Minister Gideon Sa'ar criticised Halsema, saying that her comment was "utterly unacceptable".

=== Work outside of politics ===
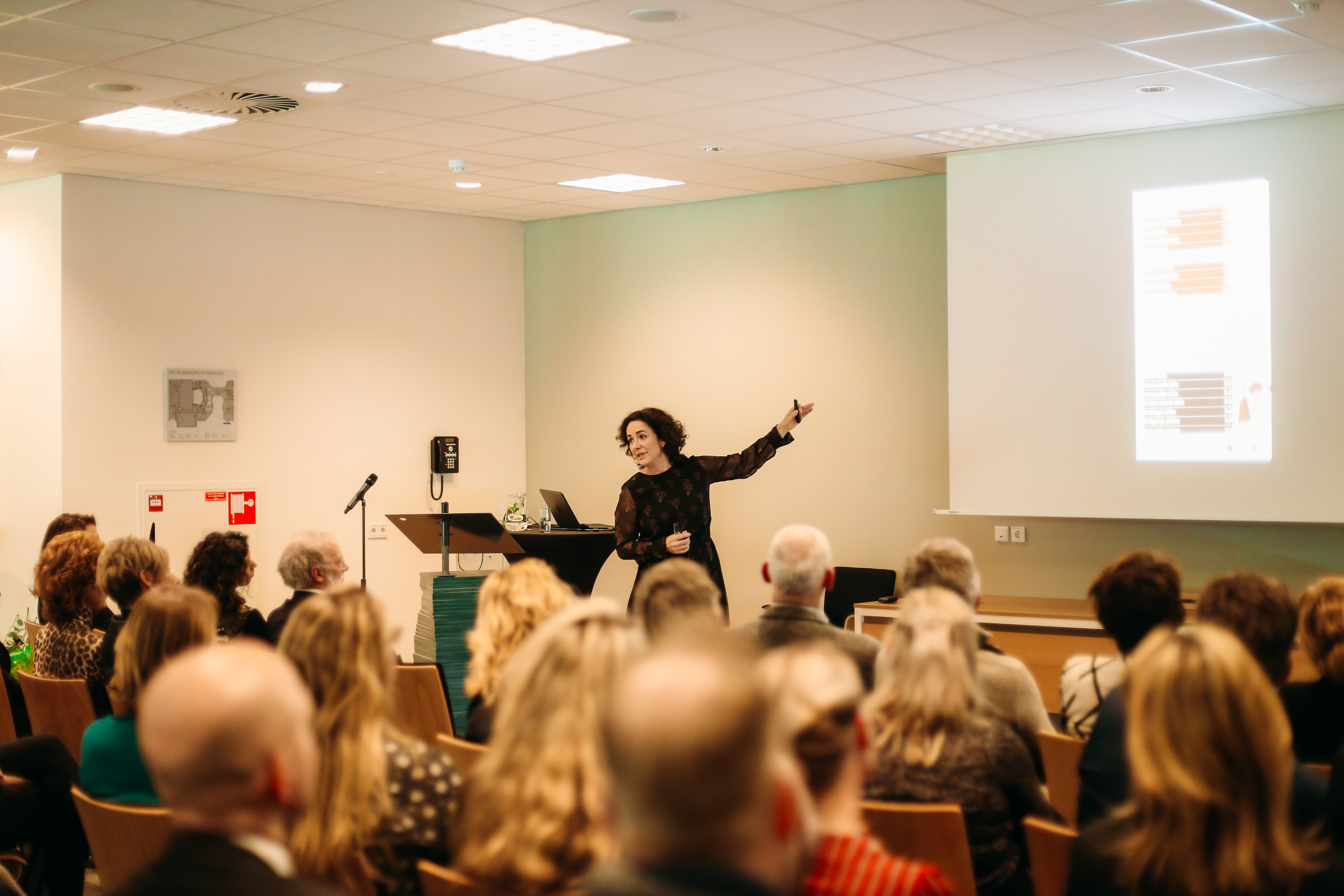
Halsema during a preview of her theatre-lecture Een Vrij Land in 2018

After she left politics in January 2011, Halsema worked as freelancer.

Immediately after her political career, Halsema joined De Volkskrant, for which she wrote number of articles and columns in 2011 and 2012. In 2013, she was involved in De Correspondent, for which she also wrote articles for two years. In 2016 she wrote her political memoir Pluche. In 2017 she wrote the Essay Nergensland. Nieuw Licht op migratie ("Nowhereland. A new light on migration"), where she proposed a utopian alternative to the international refugee question. In 2018 she wrote the essay Macht en Verbeelding ("Power and Imagination").

In 2011, she became professor by special appointment at Tilburg University occupying the Leonardo Chair for half a year. She taught at the Tilburg School of Humanities. In 2012 she became a temporary professor at University of Utrecht, occupying the Peace of Utrecht Chair. She researched the meaning of social media for human rights and democracy.

In December 2012, she led an inquiry into the behaviour of administrators at the school board of Amarantis. She succeeded Martin van Rijn, who had become junior minister of Health. The committee Halsema found that the board had acted within the law but that their behaviour was not desirable. After that she led a committee on the governance code for the semi-public sector at the request of the Minister of Economic Affairs Henk Kamp The final report of the committee concluded that a governance code would not lead to the desired culture change in the semi-public sector. The committee focused its attention on the old boys network and political cooperation. In 2015 she was asked by employees and students at the University of Amsterdam to lead the committee concerning the financial policy of the university. After a month she returned the assignment. The committee felt that elementary conditions were not met for independent, careful research. Since January 2018, Halsema at the request of the Council of the Judiciary chair of the quadrennial review committee.

Since 2011, Halsema has been President-Commissioner at WPG Uitgevers, which is among other responsible for the publisher De Bezige Bij, Vrij Nederland and Voetbal International. Since 2015 Halsema has been chair for the Trade Organisation for Healthcare for the Handicapped (VGN). Because of that office she is chair of the Executive Consultation for Healthcare (BOZ), a partnership between employers' organisations and patients' organisations in the realm of healthcare. In addition to this she has a number of functions in the public and private sector: between 2012 and 2014 she was chair of the Advisory Council of ASN Bank. Since 2015 she is a member of the board the Start Foundation, a fund for people who have "distance to the labour market". And since 2016 she has been a commissioner at Independer. Additionally, Halsema has been a member of the executive of a number of non-profits: between 2011 and 2017 she was chair of the board of Stichting Vluchteling. Since 2017, she has been chair of the board of Aidsfonds/Stopaidsnow. She chairs the board of Adelheid Roosen's theatre company and of IDFA.

In 2014, Halsema made the six-part documentary series Seks en de Zonde ("Sex and Sin") with Hassnae Bouazza about women in the Islamic world. She interviewed activists Veena Malik and Souad al-Shammary for this. Together with Gijs van de Westelaken, she developed and produced the TV-series De Fractie ("The Parliamentary Party") about politics in The Hague. Recently she has been working with her partner Robert Oey on a documentary series on terrorism. In the Spring of 2017, she made a theatre tour with her theatre-lecture Een Vrij Land ("A Free Country").

== Political views ==
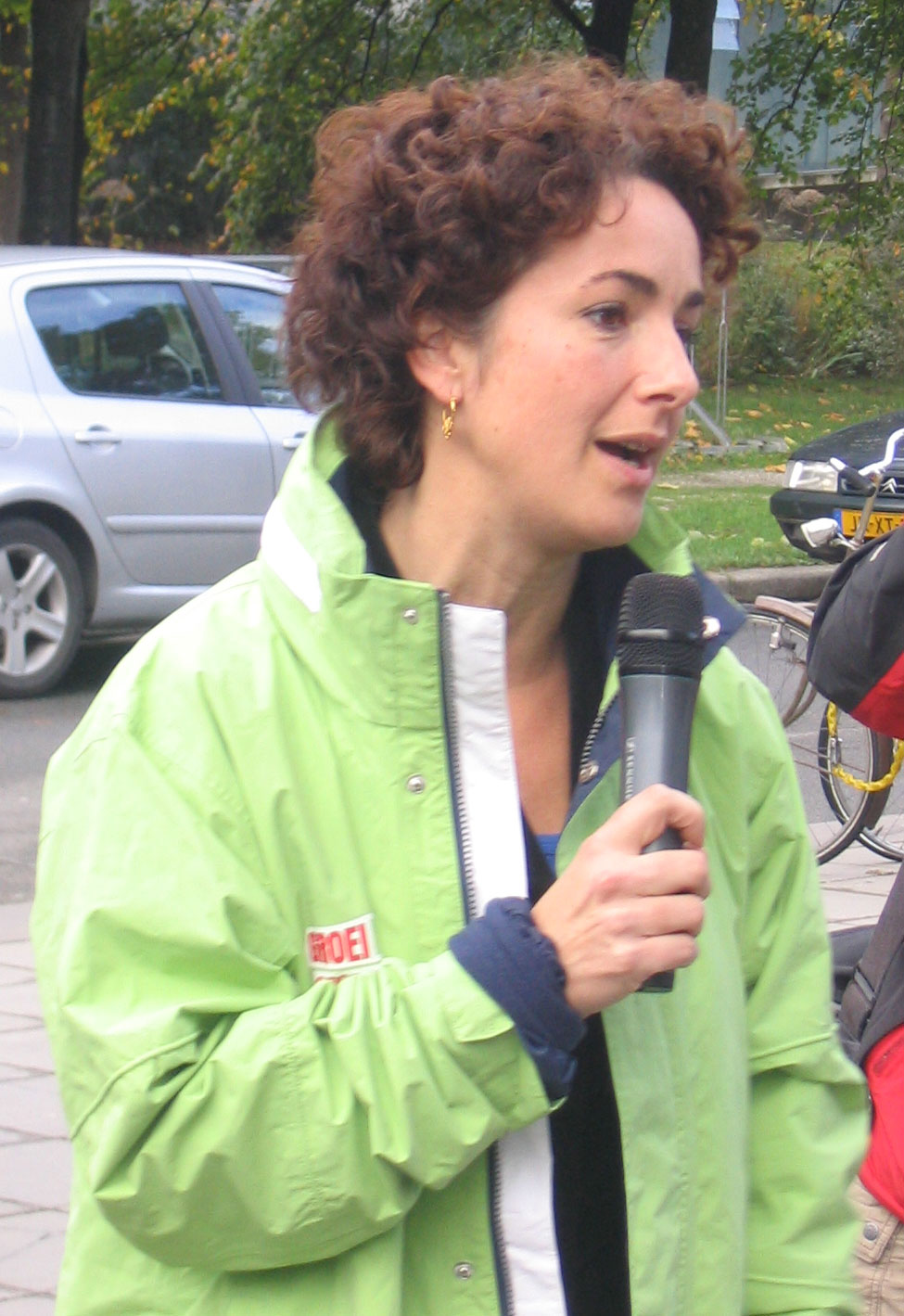
Femke Halsema campaigning in 2006

Halsema sees herself as a left-liberal. In Dutch she prefers vrijzinnig (free-thinking) over liberaal (liberal) because the conservative liberal People's Party for Freedom and Democracy is seen as the pre-eminent liberal party. In 2004, she started a debate within her party about a new political course. Her new course emphasises two concepts: freedom and pragmatism.

With the concept freedom, Halsema seeks to connect herself with the "freedom-loving traditions of the left". Like Isaiah Berlin, Halsema discerns two traditions of freedom: negative and positive liberty. For Halsema negative liberty is the freedom of citizens from government interference. She wants to apply this concept especially to the multicultural society and rule of law, where she seeks to reduce the influence of government. Positive liberty is, according to Halsema, the emancipation of citizens from poverty. Halsema wants to apply this concept especially to the economy, the welfare state and the environment, where the government should take more action.

With pragmatism, Halsema has contrasted her politics with those of the new populist political right, such as Pim Fortuyn. While the right, in Halsema's eyes, had become dogmatic and tried to reform society on the basis of new principles, Halsema claimed that the left has got more feeling for the "narrow margins of politics." According to Halsema, the left has emphasised equitable outcomes, as opposed to merely fair-minded principles.

This new course has been integrated into several practical proposals on the economy, which together form Vrijheid Eerlijk Delen ("Sharing Liberty Fairly"). These proposals have led to considerable debate. Halsema proposes that the main goal of the welfare state should be the emancipation of citizens from poverty. To ensure this, she proposes a new model for the welfare state, which is modelled on the Danish welfare state. In her perception of the welfare state, the government should endeavour to ensure full employment by cutting taxes on labour, increasing labour flexibility and creating more government jobs. If there is more work, so this theory goes, everybody can get a job, after a maximum of one year of unemployment. She also called for the implementation of a partial basic income.

== Personal life ==
Halsema married the TV documentary maker Robert Oey. Oey made among others the film De Leugen (The Lie) in which Halsema participated amongst others by singing. On 20 December 2022 they announced that they had been separated for a year. Their twin children are Bruno and Suzy. Halsema resides in an official residence on Herengracht while Oey kept the house in Holysloot.

== Bibliography ==
- 1995 – Ontspoord. Opstellen over criminaliteit & rechtshandhaving
- 1997 – Land in zicht. een cultuurpolitieke benadering van de Ruimtelijke Ordening (with Maarten Hajer)
- 2005 – Vrijheid als ideaal (edited by Bart Snels)
- 2006 – Linkse lente
- 2008 – Geluk! Voorbij de hyperconsumptie, haast en hufterigheid
- 2010 – Zoeken naar vrijheid
- 2016 – Pluche. Politieke memoires
- 2017 – Nergensland, Nieuw licht op migratie
- 2018 – Macht en Verbeelding. Essay voor de maand van de filosofie
