= President of the Congress of Local and Regional Authorities =

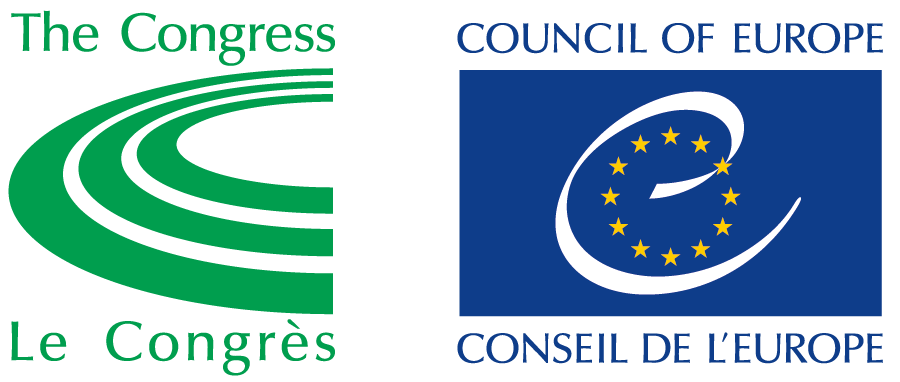

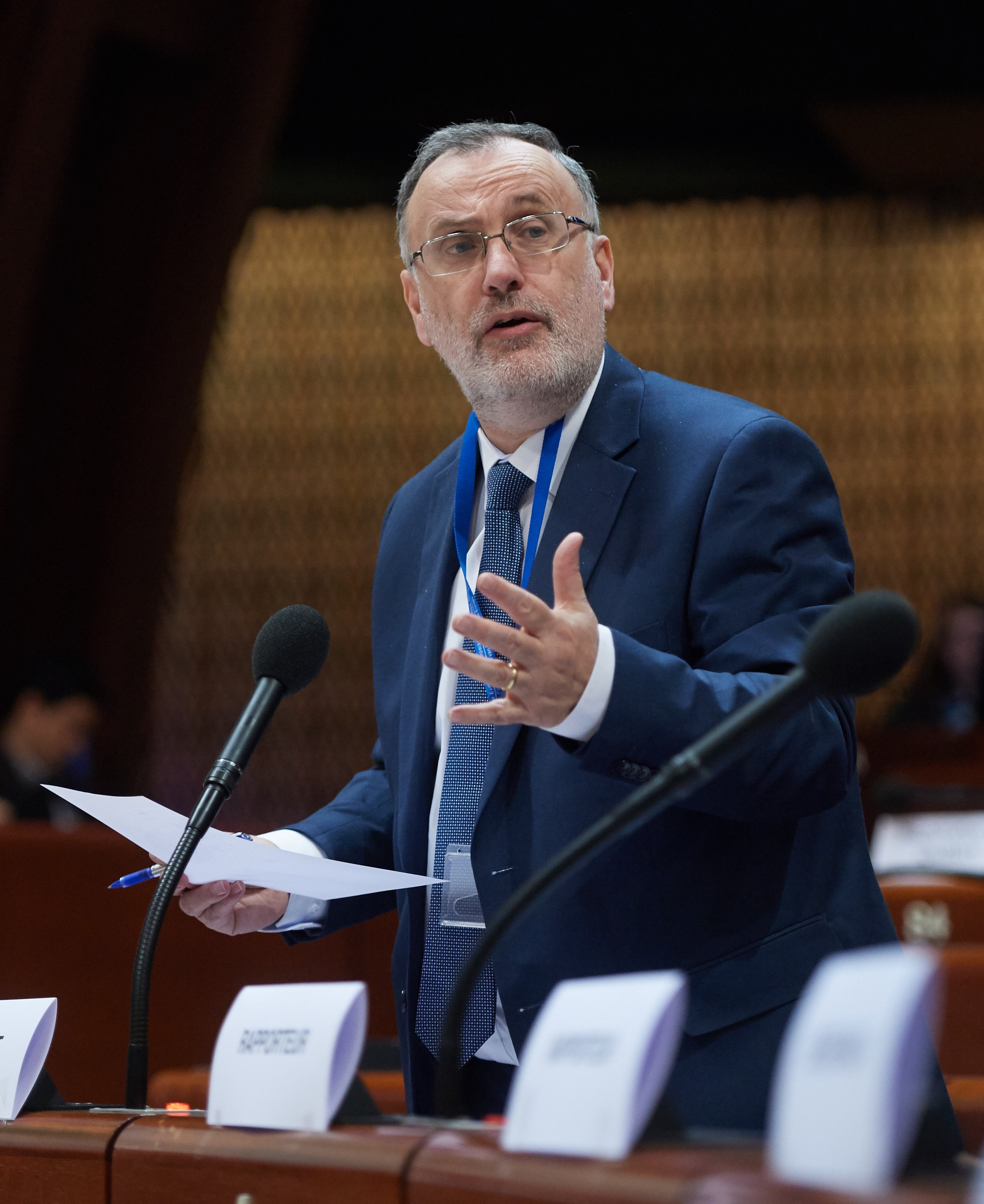
- Incumbent (Belgium) Marc Cools since October 24, 2023
- Term length: Two and a half years
- Constituting instrument: Statutory Resolution and Charter of the Congress
- Formation: 12 January 1957
- First holder: Jacques Chaban-Delmas
- Final holder: Leendert Verbeek
- Website: coe.int/en/web/congress/presidency

The President of the Congress of Local and Regional Authorities of the Council of Europe is elected by the Congress, from among the delegates who are representatives in their delegations, on an alternating basis from each chamber (The Chamber of Local Authorities and the Chamber of Regions). The President of the Congress has a mandate of two and a half years.

The current President is Marc Cools, elected on October 24, 2023.

== List of presidents of the Congress of Local and Regional Authorities ==
Presidents of the Conference of Local Authorities of Europe (1957-1983) and of the Standing Conference of Local and Regional Authorities of Europe (1983-1994)
Nationality	President	Presidency
France	Jacques Chaban-Delmas	January 12, 1957 - January 24, 1960
France	Georges Dardel	1960 - 1962
Luxembourg	Henri Cravatte	1962 - 1966
United Kingdom	Francis Hill	1966 - 1968
Austria	Alois Lugger	1968 - 1970
Norway	Kjell T. Evers	1970 - 1972
Italy	Giancarlo Piombino	1972 - 1974
Netherlands	Reint Laan	1974 - 1976
Luxembourg	Henri Cravatte	1976 - 1978
United Kingdom	Gordon Pirie	1978 - 1980
Switzerland	Bernard Dupont	1980 - 1982
Netherlands	Eric Kiesl	1982 - 1984
Denmark	John Winther	1984 - 1985
Spain	Antoni Srana	1985 - 1987
United Kingdom	John Morgan	1987 - 1991
France	Lucien Sergent	1991 - 1992
Sweden	Bengt Mollstedt	1992 - 1994

Presidents of the Congress of Local and Regional Authorities since 1994
Nationality	President	Presidency
Netherlands	Alexander Tchernoff	May 31, 1994 - July 2, 1996
Switzerland	Claude Haegi	July 2, 1996 - May 25, 1998
France	Alain Chénard	May 26, 1998 - May 23, 2000
Spain	Llibert Cuatrecasas	May 23, 2000 - July 2, 2002
Austria	Herwig van Staa	June 2, 2002 - May 25, 2004
Italy	Giovanni di Stasi	May 25, 2004 - May 30, 2006
Norway	Halvdan Skard	May 30, 2006 - May 27, 2008
Turkey	Yavuz Mildon	May 27, 2008 - October 26, 2010
United Kingdom	Keith Whitmore	October 26, 2010 - October 16, 2012
Austria	Herwig van Staa	October 16, 2012 - October 14, 2014
France	Jean-Claude Frécon	October 14, 2014 - October 16,2016
Austria	Gudrun Mosler-Törnström	October 16, 2016 - November 6, 2018
Sweden	Anders Knape	November 6, 2018 - March 23, 2021
Netherlands	Leendert Verbeek	March 23, 2021 - October 24, 2023
Belgium	Marc Cools	Since October 24, 2023
