= Congress of Local and Regional Authorities =

Pan-European political assembly

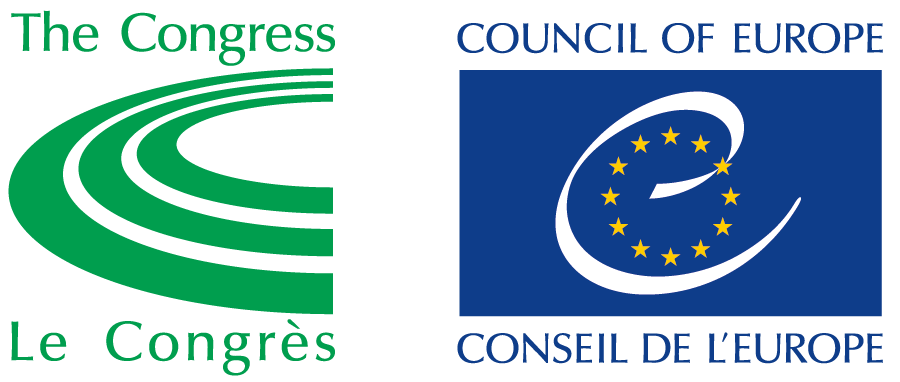
- The logo of the Congress
- Abbreviation: Congress
- Formation: 12 January 1957; 69 years ago
- Type: IGO
- Headquarters: Strasbourg, France
- Members: 46 member states of the Council of Europe
- Official language: English, French
- President: Gunn Marit Helgesen
- Secretary General: Mathieu Mori
- President of the Chamber of Local Authorities: Konstantinos Koukas
- President of the Chamber of Regions: Cecilia Dalman Eek
- Parent organization: Council of Europe
- Affiliations: European Union, Organization for Security and Co-operation in Europe
- Website: www.coe.int/congress
- Formerly called: Standing Conference of Local and Regional Authorities of Europe

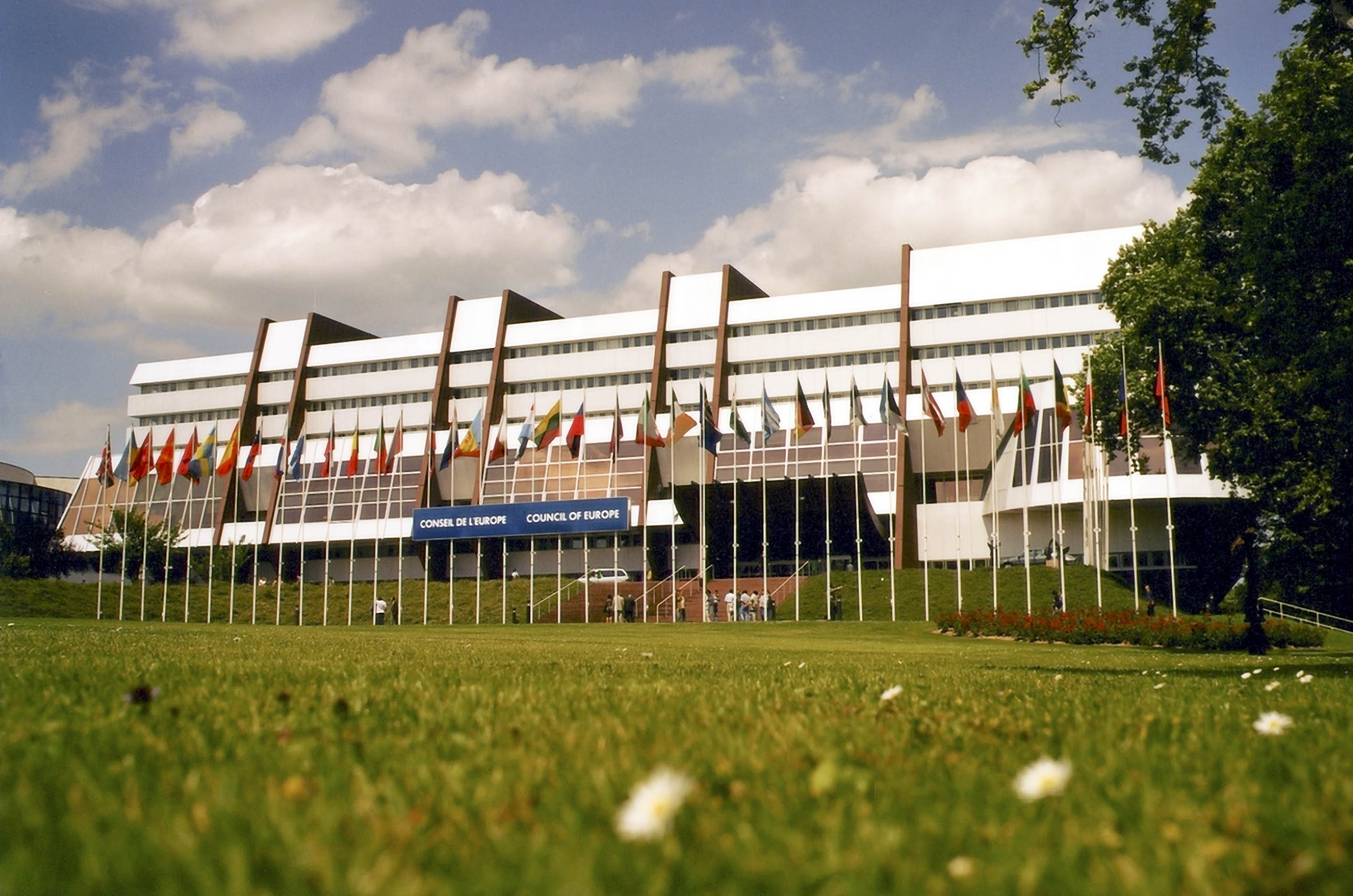
Palais de L'Europe: seat of the Congress

The Congress of Local and Regional Authorities is the pan-European political assembly representing local and regional authorities from the forty-six member states of the Council of Europe. Known from 1957 to 1983 as the Conference of Local Authorities of Europe and from 1983 to 1994 as the Standing Conference of Local and Regional Authorities of Europe, its role is to promote local and regional democracy, improve local and regional governance, and strengthen authorities' self-government according to the principles laid down in the European Charter of Local Self-Government.

The Congress is made up of two chambers, the Chamber of Local Authorities and the Chamber of Regions, and holds its plenary sessions twice a year at the Palace of Europe in Strasbourg, where its permanent Secretariat is based.

The two Chambers have a total of 612 members, who each must hold an elective office (they may be regional or municipal councillors, mayors or presidents of regional authorities) and who represent over 130,000 authorities in the different states. It encourages the devolution and regionalization processes, as well as the trans-frontier co-operation between cities and regions. The Congress conducts regular monitoring visits to all member states to appraise their implementation of the European Charter of Local Self-Government, observes the functioning of local and regional elections in its member states, and creates international treaties that lay down common European standards to protect local authorities' rights.

== History ==
The present Congress of Local and Regional Authorities was established on 14 January 1994 with the Statutory Resolution 94(3) of the Committee of Ministers of the Council of Europe. However, the history of the Congress reflects the already fifty-year history of the development of local and regional democracy in Europe.

The Congress's predecessor, the Conference of Local Authorities of Europe was first established at the Council of Europe in 1957. It held its first session on 12 January 1957 in Strasbourg presided by the prominent French statesman Jacques Chaban-Delmas, who was President of the Conference from January 1957 to January 1960. In 1975 the Committee of Ministers established the Conference of Local and Regional Authorities of Europe that brought together also representatives of European regions, not only local authorities, thus replacing and enhancing the Conference of Local Authorities.

In 1979 it became the Standing Conference of Local and Regional Authorities of Europe. Six years later, in 1985, the Standing Conference adopted the European Charter of Local Self-Government, recognizing the increasing role of the development of local democracy, which has become one of the most important achievements of the organization. The Charter was opened for signature in October 1985 and has since been signed by all Council of Europe member states. In 1994 the Standing Conference asked the Committee of Ministers to further enhance its statute, and the Standing Conference was transformed into the present Congress of Local and Regional Authorities. In 2005, during the Warsaw Summit, the Heads of State and Government of the member states of the Council of Europe reasserted the importance of local and regional democracy for Europe and underlined the major role of the Congress in its mission, again supporting its mandate.

In October 2010, the Congress adopted a comprehensive reform of its structures and activities meant to increase the impact of its action and make it more effective and more relevant to European citizens and their elected representatives. In particular, the structural changes included the creation of three new committees, to replace the existing previous four: a Monitoring Committee, a Governance Committee and a Current Affairs Committee. Moreover, a Statutory Forum was set up, the mandate of Congress members extended from two to four years, and the 30-per cent requirement for women's representation in national delegations applied also to substitute members. The role of the Bureau as the executive body of the Congress was strengthened, and the adopted texts subject to a clearer and more concrete follow-up procedure.

In the light of this reform, the Committee of Ministers adopted a revised version of the Statutory Resolution and the Charter of the Congress in January 2011. The Congress adopted its new Rules of Procedure in March 2012. In October 2012 it adopted its priorities 2013–2016. These priorities are focused on 5 areas: monitoring of local and regional democracy, observation of local and regional elections, targeted post-monitoring and post-observation assistance, the local and regional dimension of human rights and streamlined thematic activities.

== Role ==
As political Assembly of local and regional elected representatives, the Congress is the voice of Europe's 130,000 regions and municipalities. It promotes the strengthening of local and regional democracy in all Council of Europe member States. The Congress carries out monitoring missions of the local and regional authorities in member states and prepares reports on the situation in the State concerned. These reports and the draft resolutions and recommendations they contain are submitted to the plenary sessions which debate them in the presence of high representatives of the governments before adopting them. The recommendations are then forwarded to the Committee of Ministers of the Council of Europe which gives them the appropriate follow up whenever needed. It also observes local and regional elections. After an observation mission it drafts a report and a recommendation which are also submitted to the sessions for adoption.

Furthermore, it prepares thematic reports which, together with a recommendation and/or a resolution, are debated during its sessions.

To fulfill its objectives the Congress cooperates with various partners: national associations, international associations, observers, civil society and other institutional partners such as the Committee of Regions of the European Union.

=== Priorities of the Congress 2021–2026 ===
The Congress will focus on the contribution of local and regional authorities to the UN Sustainable Development Goals by promoting:

- Resilient societies: effective responses to public health crisis;
- Democratic societies: quality of representative democracy and citizen participation;
- Cohesive societies: reducing inequalities;
- Sustainable societies: environmental issues and climate action;
- Digital societies: digitalisation and artificial intelligence in the local context.

== Structure ==
=== Bureau ===
The Bureau of the Congress, which consists of the members of the Chamber of Local Authorities and the Chamber of Regions under the leadership of the Congress President, is responsible for organising the plenary sessions, the coordination of the work of the two chambers and the committees, as well as organising the monitoring and election observation missions, the budget and all questions that need to be treated in between two plenary sessions.

Complete list of Congress Bureau members

=== Chambers ===
==== Chamber of Local Authorities ====
The main task of the Chamber of Local Authorities is to assess the situation of local democracy and observe local elections based on the European Charter of Local Self-Government. The Chamber also handles social issues and supports the cooperation of European cities, such as intercultural dialogues, e-democracy, or multiculturalism. It promotes the principles of local democracy outside Europe, inter alia through Euro-Arab dialogue between cities and Euro-Mediterranean co-operation. At its meetings, which take place twice a year during the Plenary Sessions, the Chamber of Local Authorities holds thematic debates on issues such as the fight against radicalisation, cities against terrorism, migrations, the protection of cultural heritage and adopts recommendations and resolutions. If necessary, the Chamber of Local Authorities can also require a member to write a report to a relevant question of his or her expertise. The Chamber of Local Authorities must examine issues that are relevant to its jurisdiction, namely substantive and current issues relating to the local dimension in Europe, and if necessary may raise a debate during a Congress session. A list of the members of this Chamber can be found here.

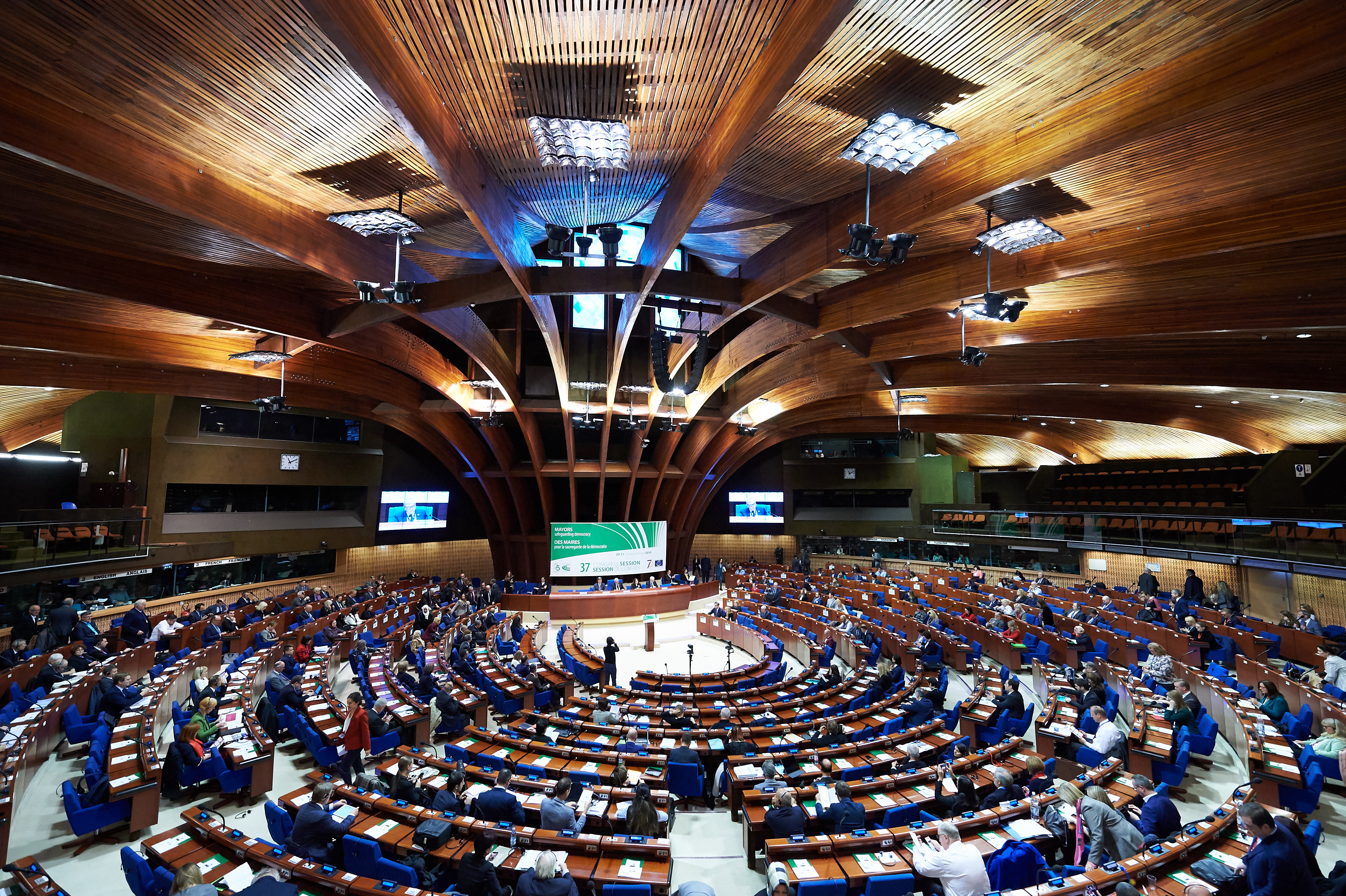
Session of the Congress

==== Chamber of Regions ====
The Chamber of Regions consists of representatives of authorities that act between the local and central levels of government. The authority must have either self-governing or state-like powers. It must effectively be able to take full responsibility for a substantial share of matters of public concern, in the interest of its community, and it has to take into account the principle of subsidiarity. The Chamber of Regions meets twice a year during the plenary sessions of the Congress, holds debates on issues such as the regionalisation in Europe, and adopts resolutions and recommendations. It deals with the role of regions within the member states of the Congress, regional democracy, inter-regional cooperation and regional economy, among others. The members of this Chamber can be found here.

=== Statutory Forum ===
With the adoption of the revised Charter of the Congress on 19 January 2011, the former Standing Committee was replaced by the Statutory Forum. This Forum is composed of heads of all national delegations together with the members of the Bureau of Congress. The Forum acts on behalf of the Congress between sessions and may be convened at any time by the President of the Congress, as he deems necessary.

=== Committees ===
In October 2010, the Congress set up three committees: the Monitoring Committee, the Governance Committee and the Current Affairs Committee. These Committees prepare most of the reports which are submitted to the Chambers or to the Plenary Sessions. In March 2024, the terms of reference of the committees were revised and their names changed to the Committee on the Monitoring of the implementation of the European Charter of Local Self-Government and on the respect of Human Rights and the Rule of Law at local and regional levels (“the Monitoring Committee”); the Committee on Governance, Civic Engagement and the Environment (“the Governance Committee”); and the Committee on Social Inclusion and Human Dignity (“the Social Inclusion Committee”).

==== Monitoring Committee ====
The Monitoring Committee was established to follow the implementation of the commitment and obligations of the member states to the European Charter of Local Self-Government. It organises monitoring visits and drafts reports and recommendations on the situation of the local and regional democracy in the member states concerned. It encourages member states to evaluate the situation of local democracy, in relation to the Charter, and identifies the obstacles that prevent them from implementing it fully. The members of this Committee can be found here.

==== Governance Committee ====
The Governance Committee is responsible for affairs relating to the Congress's statutory mandate. These include public finance, cross border and inter-regional co-operation and e-democracy as well as co-operation with intergovernmental bodies. The site of the Congress contains a list with the members of this Committee.

==== Social Inclusion Committee ====
The members of this Committee can be found on the site of the Congress.

=== The Group of Independent Experts on the European Charter of Local Self-Government ===
The Group of Independent Experts helps the three statutory committees to carry out their responsibilities in local and regional democracy, in regards to the European Charter. The experts are recruited from universities and other research centers based on their expertise in law, economics, or political science and have a renewable term of four years. The Group of Independent Experts is mandated to assist the Congress in :

1. Preparing reports on the condition of local and regional democracy within the member states (monitoring reports)
2. Preparing reports about specific aspects of the Charter within a member state, or a group of members states (specific monitoring reports)
3. Preparing reports on a specific point in the Charter, which poses problems regarding compliance with the Charter (research reports)
4. Preparing reports on issues of concern for local and regional authorities
5. Preparing reports on the promotion of local and regional democracy

=== Secretariat ===
The Congress Secretariat is headed by the Secretary General, who is elected for five years by the plenary meeting of Congress. The Secretary General is supported by the Congress Director. The Secretariat of the two chambers of Congress will be occupied by two executive secretaries, who are appointed by the Secretary General after consultation with the Congress.

=== Presidents of the Congress ===
- 2002–2004: Herwig van Staa (Austria)
- 2004–2006: Giovanni di Stasi (Italy)
- 2006–2008: Halvdan Skard (Norway)
- 2008–2010: Yavuz Mildon (Turkey)
- 2009–2010: Ian Micallef (Malta, acting president)
- 2010–2012: Keith Whitmore (United Kingdom)
- 2012–2014: Herwig van Staa (Austria)
- 2014–2016: Jean-Claude Frécon (France)
- 2016–2018: Gudrun Mosler-Törnström (Austria)
- 2018–2021: Anders Knape (Sweden)
- 2021–2023: Leendert Verbeek (Netherlands)
- 2023–2026: Marc Cools (Belgium)
- 2026– : Gunn Marit Helgesen (Norway)

== National delegations ==
The Congress is formed of national delegations made up of representatives of local and regional authorities of the 46 member States of the Council of Europe, who are either directly elected or are politically accountable to a directly elected assembly. The membership of each member state's delegation ensures a balanced geographical distribution of territories, equitable representation of the various types of local and regional authorities and political forces, and equitable representation of women and men. Each member state has the right to the same number of seats in the Congress as in the Parliamentary Assembly of the Council of Europe. Apart from full members, the delegations are also made of substitutes (who work in the same capacity). A list of the national delegations and their members can be found on the Congress site.

=== Members of Congress ===
According to its statute, the Congress consists of 306 representatives (and 306 substitutes) from each member state, as follows:

State	Members	State	Members	State	Members
Albania	4/4	Andorra	2/2	Armenia	4/4
Austria	6/6	Azerbaijan	6/6	Belgium	7/7
Bosnia and Herzegovina	5/5	Bulgaria	6/6	Croatia	5/5
Cyprus	3/3	Czechia	7/7	Denmark	5/5
Estonia	3/3	Finland	5/5	France	18/18
Georgia	5/5	Germany	18/18	Greece	7/7
Hungary	7/7	Iceland	3/3	Ireland	4/4
Italy	18/18	Latvia	3/3	Liechtenstein	2/2
Lithuania	4/4	Luxembourg	3/3	Malta	3/3
Moldova	5/5	Monaco	2/2	Montenegro	3/3
Netherlands	7/7	North Macedonia	3/3	Norway	5/5
Poland	12/12	Portugal	7/7	Romania	10/10
San Marino	2/2	Serbia	7/7	Slovakia	5/5
Slovenia	3/3	Spain	12/12	Sweden	6/6
Switzerland	6/6	Türkiye	18/18	Ukraine	12/12
United Kingdom	18/18				
TOTAL					306/306

Two representatives of local government in Kosovo participate in the work of the Congress as observers.

=== Political groups ===
The political groups within the Congress ensure an equitable representation, in terms of political, geographical and gender balance in each delegation. The Congress Charter sets a minimum of representation of 30% for the under-represented sex for each delegation. There are four political groups within the Congress, as well as Congress members not affiliated with any political group:

- SOC/G/PD – Group of Socialists, Greens and Progressive Democrats
- EPP/CCE – European People's Party Group
- ILDG – Independent and Liberal Democratic Group
- ECR – European Conservatives and Reformists
- PfE – Patriots for Europe

The Congress meets twice a year for the plenary sessions, which are held in Strasbourg. The sessions for each Chamber are held during the plenary sessions. Every two years, the Congress appoints a President from among the representatives, or full members.

See the Congress site for recent information on the political groups.

== Activities ==
=== Monitoring of local and regional democracy ===
The core mission of the Congress of Local and Regional Authorities is the effective monitoring of the situation of local and regional democracy in member states by assessing the application of the European Charter of Local Self-Government. Through this process of monitoring, the Congress contributes, at territorial level, to the main objectives of the Council of Europe, which are to advance democracy and human rights on the continent. Monitoring is also part of an ongoing political dialogue with the different levels of governance in the State concerned.

The Congress undertakes: regular general country-by-country monitoring missions; the examination of a particular aspect of the Charter; fact-finding missions to look into specific cases of concern; Following monitoring visits, the Monitoring Committee draws up reports and recommendations to member states on how to improve the management of municipalities and regions. These recommendations are debated and adopted during the sessions of the Congress. More information and examples of recently adopted texts in this area can be found here.

=== Observation of elections ===
The observation of the local and regional elections is an important aspect of the tasks of the Congress, which complements the monitoring activities. The observation missions are conducted at the request of the responsible parties; the Congress sets up a delegation made of Congress members and members of the Committee of the Regions (some 10–15 people). At the close of the observation mission a preliminary statement by the Congress delegation is made. Then a report that includes an analysis of the election campaign, voting day, and recommendations/improvements to be made is prepared and submitted to the session of the Congress. The Congress collaborates with institutions of the Council of Europe such as the Parliamentary Assembly and the Venice Commission. The details of the procedure are set out in Congress resolution More information on the observation of elections can be found on Congress site.

=== Post-monitoring and post-observation dialogue ===
In March 2013 the Congress adopted Resolution 353(2013) on post-monitoring and post-observation of elections. The aim is to develop the political dialogue with Member States and relevant stakeholders after a monitoring or election observation visit and to make recommendations for improvements. The first roadmap prepared in the framework of this post-monitoring dialogue concerned the decentralisation reform undertaken by the Ukrainian authorities and was signed in May 2015.

== Cooperation programmes and projects ==
=== Co-operation Programmes ===
In its Priorities 2013–2016, the Congress decided to further develop co-operation and partnerships with the overall objective to consolidate and advance territorial democracy in the Council of Europe member states and in its immediate neighbourhood and achieve concrete results in the field. These cooperation activities help to further ensure the implementation of the European Charter of Local Self-Government and the Congress recommendations. The Congress offers its expertise, in the field of local and regional democracy, based on needs, its members being a pool of practical and political experience. Its activities include:

- Assessment of the legal and institutional framework
- Drafting of new legislation and policies
- Exchange of good practices – peer-to-peer exchanges and interactive seminars
- Training sessions on leadership for local and regional elected representatives

The Congress develops its projects within the chapter on Democracy in the Council of Europe Action Plans for member States. These projects are co-financed through voluntary contributions of member states and international partners.

The Congress is also active in the neighbourhood policy of the Council of Europe. This policy is aimed at helping neighbouring regions to improve democracy, the rule of law and human rights protection. As an example, priorities for co-operation in Morocco and Tunisia include local governance. In the past the Congress has been active in strengthening local democracy and trans-border co-operation in Europe. It has encouraged the creation of associations of local authorities and created several networks which have now evolved independently and which are privileged partners of the Congress. Examples of these Associations are the Association of Local Democracy Agencies (ALDA), the Network of Associations of Local Authorities of South-East Europe (NALAS) and the European Network of Local and Regional Training Establishments (ENTO).

=== Projects ===
==== Roma Alliance ====
The European Alliance of Cities and Regions for Roma Inclusion was set up by the Congress of Local and Regional Authorities with the support of Special Representative of the Council of Europe Secretary General for Roma Issues. More than 120 cities and regions from over 27 countries are participating in the Alliance. The Alliance aims to achieve these objectives:

1. To promote the exchange of know-how and good practices on Roma inclusion among participating cities and regions.
2. To enable participating cities and regions to speak with one voice by providing a platform for advocating on issues concerning Roma inclusion at local and regional level.

The Alliance organises national and international seminars for its participating cities and regions in order to facilitate the exchange of know-how and good practices.

One of the key priorities of the Alliance is the promotion of the Roma culture and raising awareness and knowledge about the Roma Genocide during World War II and the international commemoration day on the 2nd of August.

Another important initiative of the Council of Europe, aimed at fighting antigypsyism, is the Dosta! Campaign, run on a national level in the member states. As of 2013, the Alliance is in charge of administrating the Dosta! Congress Prize, awarded biannually to three municipalities for their successful and innovative projects in the field of Roma inclusion.

In 2013–2014 the Alliance implemented the first stage of the project named ROMACT. Around 30 cities and regions were engaged in activities, consisting of preparation work, including data collection and analysis, thematic workshops, study visits, exchange of information, opportunities for networking and developing partnerships, consultative work. Other activities of the ROMACT The project ended in late 2014 with a major evaluation conference of cities and regions as well as local, national and international stakeholders.

The Alliance has its own website with more information on its activities.

==== ONE in FIVE ====
The ONE in FIVE Campaign of the Council of Europe sets out to promote the signature and ratification of the Council of Europe Convention on the Protection of Children against Sexual Exploitation and Sexual Abuse, also known as the Lanzarote Convention. The Campaign's goals are to make children aware of the gravity and different types of sexual violence and abuse, and to prevent them. The Congress is ensuring the local and regional dimensions of the Campaign and has launched a Pact of Towns and Regions to Stop Sexual Violence against Children. The Pact proposes the 'four Ps' approach: to prevent abuse, protect victims, prosecute perpetrators while ensuring the full participation of children in the entire process. All services and actions must be respectful of children's rights, put the child's best interest first, and enable children's voices to be heard, in order to deliver locally what children and families need to stop sexual violence and sexual abuse, as well as to bring perpetrators to justice. The Congress promotes this Pact with cities and regions and encourages them to sign and implement it in the field.

== Partners of the Congress ==
=== Committee of the Regions of the European Union ===
The Congress has developed an institutional partnership with the Committee of the Regions (CoR) of the European Union, regular meetings and coordination between the respective members and secretariats take place. The cooperation between the Congress and the Committee of the Regions is in place since the creation of the CoR in 1994. A 'Contact Group Congress/Committee of the Regions', that meets twice per year, was established in 1995. The Contact Group coordinates the two institutions' efforts and provides feedback on their activities. The Congress and CoR members exchange views and implement common strategies. Since 2006 it is possible for members of the CoR to be part of an elections observation mission of the Congress. Nowadays, this happens systematically and members of the CoR are involved in the whole observation process. The Congress also pursues an active cooperation with the Commission for Citizenship, Governance, Institutional and External Affairs (CIVEX) and the Conference of regional organizations and local authorities for the Eastern partnership (CORLEAP), both established by the CoR in order to enhance the relations between the EU and its neighbouring countries in the area of local and regional self-governance. The neighbouring states involved are often Member States of the Congress and the Congress is involved in activities of these entities, as well. More information on the cooperation between the Congress and the COR can be found on both the site of the Congress and on the site of the COR.

=== Venice Commission ===
The Congress is one of the Council of Europe bodies entitled to request a non-binding opinion from the Venice Commission, which advises on constitutional and electoral law. It has used this option twice regarding Turkey.

In 2025, amid a renewed wave of dismissals and pre-trial detentions of opposition-affiliated mayors in Turkey — including the March 2025 arrest of Istanbul mayor Ekrem İmamoğlu — Congress President Marc Cools made a similar request. The Commission adopted its response, Report on the Impact of the Pre-trial Detention of Mayors on Local Democratic Governance (Opinion No. 1257/2025), at its 144th plenary session on 24 October 2025. The report concluded that prolonged pre-trial detention of elected mayors can have a chilling effect on local democratic life and undermines the ability of voters to have their chosen representatives carry out the mandate for which they were elected. The Congress subsequently cited the report in public statements calling on Turkish authorities to release detained mayors and halt further dismissals.

=== European organizations and associations of European municipalities and regions ===
The Congress is also involved with several organizations and associations of European municipalities and regions enhancing local and regional democracy by developing joint activities. Examples of these organizations are the Assembly of European Regions (AER), the Council of European Municipalities and Regions (CEMR), the Association of European Border Regions (AEBR) and the Conference of European Regional Legislative Assemblies (CALRE). The Congress can be represented at meetings or events of these organizations and makes its policies and priorities known, in particular when they fall within the scope of these organisations' fields of activities.

=== National associations ===
National (and European) associations of local and regional authorities play a role in promoting local democracy which is vital to the work of the Congress of the Council of Europe. They deliver information about Congress activities across to their countries, particularly by lobbying in their governments. They also, in some cases, play a part in the procedure whereby their country's national delegation to the Congress is designated. National associations play an active part in implementation of the provisions of the European Charter of Local Self-Government, denouncing abuses and possible violations and thus acting as an "early warning system"and a peaceful counterweight. The site of the Congress contains more information on national associations.

== Observer status ==
International associations of local and regional authorities which have a consultative status with the Council of Europe also have observer status with the Congress. Observer status may also be granted to other associations on application to the Bureau of the Congress.. This status gives them the right to take part in the work of the Congress, submit memoranda and comment on issues discussed at plenary sessions, but not to vote. One or more representatives of organizations with observer status may be invited to attend meetings of the Statutory Forum, the Bureau, the Committees or ad hoc working groups.

== See also ==
- Conference of European Regions with Legislative Power

== Sources ==
- Official website of the Congress of Local and Regional Authorities
- Official website of the Council of Europe
- Official website of the ALDA
- Official website of the NALAS
- Official website of the ENTO
- Official website of the Roma Alliance
- Official website of the ONE in FIVE Campaign
- Official website of the Committee of the Regions
- Official website of the AER
- Official website of the CEMR
- Official website of the AEBR
- Official website of the CALRE
- Priorities of the Congress 2013–2016
- Statutary Resolution 94(3)
- Statutary Resolution (2011)2 and the revised Charter of the Congress
- Rules of Procedure
- Resolution 307 (2010) on the monitoring procedure
- Resolution 306 (2010) on the observation of elections
- Resolution 353 (2013) on post-monitoring and post-observation dialogue
