= Zana Gümüş =

Turkish politician

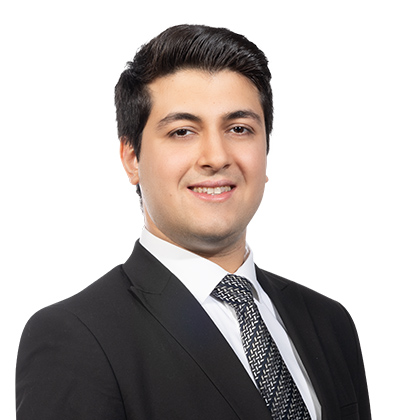

Member of the Congress of Local and Regional Authorities of the Council of Europe
- Incumbent
- Assumed office 2024

Personal details
- Born: 31 March 2001 (age 25) Diyarbakır, Turkey
- Party: Yeni Parti
- Education: Istanbul Kültür University
- Occupation: Politician

Zana Gümüş (born 31 March 2001) is a Turkish politician and a member of the Turkish delegation to the Congress of Local and Regional Authorities of the Council of Europe. He is a vice-president of the Congress's Socialists, Greens and Progressive Democrats (SOC/G/PD) group.

== Early life and education ==
Gümüş was born on 31 March 2001 in Diyarbakır, Turkey, and moved to Istanbul with his family during his childhood. He graduated in international relations from Istanbul Kültür University and undertook postgraduate studies at the University of Leicester. He is pursuing doctoral studies in political science and international relations.

== Political career ==
Gümüş has served on Sarıyer Municipal Council in Istanbul. In October 2026, he left the Republican People's Party (CHP) and joined Yeni Parti.

=== Congress of Local and Regional Authorities ===
Gümüş represents Turkey in the Congress of Local and Regional Authorities. In 2026, he became a vice-president of its Socialists, Greens and Progressive Democrats group.

In his speeches to Congress in 2025, he supported freedom of speech, defending the rights of elected representatives. He attended a meeting of the Congress's Monitoring Committee in Strasbourg in early 2026.

His election observation assignments have included the April 2025 county and municipal elections in Finland, the October 2025 local elections in North Macedonia, and the repeat early presidential election in Republika Srpska, Bosnia and Herzegovina, in February 2026.

He was one of the Congress's rapporteurs for its 2026 monitoring visit to Portugal, which assessed the country's implementation of the European Charter of Local Self-Government.

=== Protest fast ===
On 27 October 2026, during the Congress's plenary session in Strasbourg, Gümüş announced a protest fast called Adalet Orucu ('Public Fast for Justice').

He described the action as a peaceful protest against democratic backsliding in Europe and in support of the public's right to determine its own future. He said he would abstain from food until the session ended on 29 October while continuing to take part in debates and votes.

== Political views ==
Gümüş argues that Turkey should establish EU standards for its citizens even without being an EU member, and that it does not need external suggestions or measures to do so. In February 2026, he called for greater predictability in Turkey’s foreign policy and stronger institutions to guide it.

== See also ==
- Congress of Local and Regional Authorities of the Council of Europe
- European Charter of Local Self-Government
