= Jean-Claude Frécon =

French politician

Jean-Claude Frécon (3 September 1944 – 10 December 2016) was a member of the Senate of France, representing the Loire department, and from October 2014 to October 2016 was president of the Congress of Local and Regional Authorities of the Council of Europe, having served as Vice-President since 2002 and as President of the Chamber of Local Authorities (one of the two chambers of the Congress) from 2012 to 2014. He was also head of the French Delegation to the Congress from 2004.

He was a member of the French Socialist Party.

Frécon was the Vice-President of the Group of independent experts on the European Charter of Local Self-Government. In June 1998 he was the Congress rapporteur on “finances and responsibilities of local administration in Europe” and in June 2000 on “financial resources of local administration, responsibilities and the principle of subsidiarity”.

He was the Congress rapporteur on: Azerbaijan, the former Yugoslav Republic of Macedonia, Romania, the financial situation of local administration in Germany, and was general rapporteur for the European Forum of local democracy in Kyiv (2009).

He was an election observer in the following countries:

- Albania
- Azerbaijan
- "The former Yugoslav Republic of Macedonia"
- Israel
- Palestine
- Romania
- Chechnya

Frécon was instrumental in Council of Europe missions to Sarajevo for the preparation of elections, to Morocco for the implementation of decentralization, and for monitoring missions in Albania, Armenia, Belarus, Croatia, Georgia, Montenegro, Russia, Slovenia, and Latvia.

== Bibliography ==
- Page on the Senate Website
- Page on the Congress Website
