= Chris Jansen =

Dutch politician (born 1966)

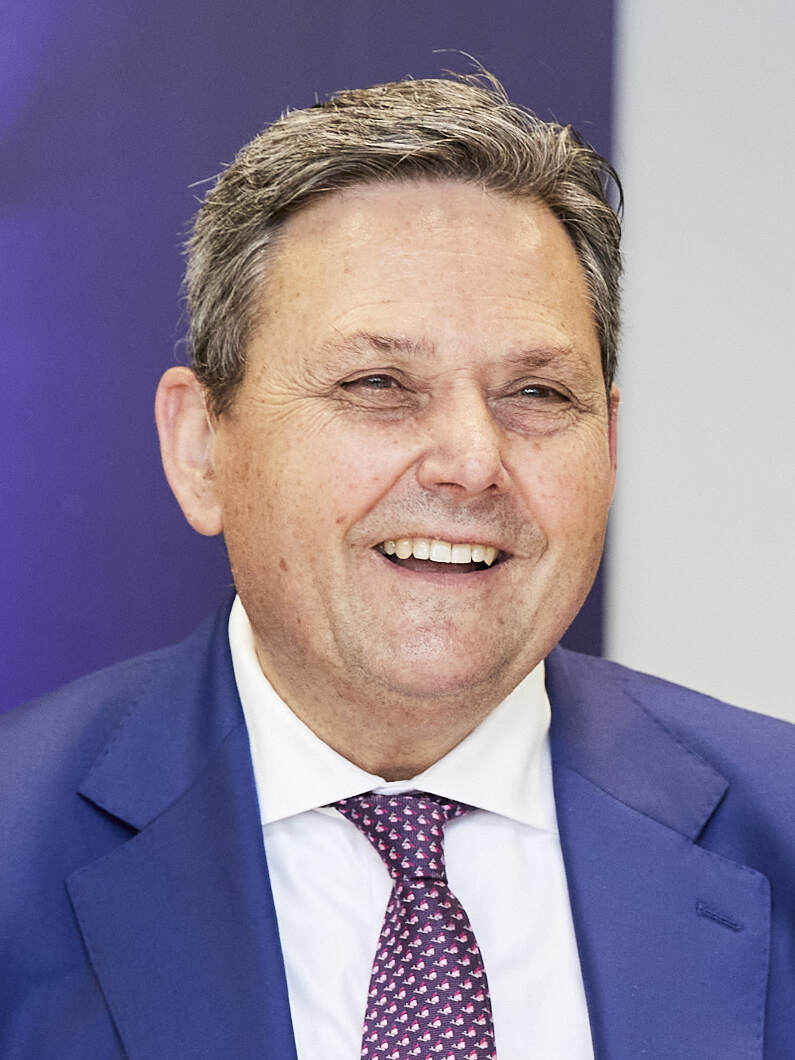
- Jansen in 2025

State Secretary for Public Transport and the Environment
- In office 2 July 2024 – 3 June 2025
- Prime Minister: Dick Schoof
- Minister: Barry Madlener
- Preceded by: Vivianne Heijnen

Member of the House of Representatives
- In office 27 November 2019 – 30 March 2021
- Preceded by: Sietse Fritsma

Member of the Provincial Executive of Flevoland
- In office 29 June 2023 – 2024

Member of the States of Flevoland
- In office 13 October 2021 – 29 June 2023
- Preceded by: Jan Meindert Keuter
- In office 10 March 2011 – 28 January 2020
- Succeeded by: Jan Meindert Keuter

Member of the Almere Municipal Council
- In office 30 March 2022 – 29 June 2023
- Succeeded by: Arnoud Ravestein
- In office 11 March 2010 – 15 January 2020

Personal details
- Born: Christiaan Anton Jansen; 27 October 1966 (age 59) Bussum, Netherlands
- Party: PVV (2010–present)
- Children: 2
- Occupation: Politician; sales manager

Christiaan Anton Jansen (born 27 October 1966) is a Dutch politician for the right-wing populist Party for Freedom (PVV). He had been serving as State Secretary for Public Transport and the Environment between July 2024 and June 2025. He is also a member of the House of Representatives since 2025, having previously served between November 2019 and March 2021.

Jansen's political career started in 2010, when he was elected to the Almere municipal council. Simultaneously, he served a member of the States of Flevoland starting the next year, rising to the position of party leader of the province in 2013. He remained loyal to Geert Wilders, founder of the PVV, after he held a speech in which he asked a crowd whether they would want more or fewer Moroccans, being the only member of the party in Almere to not distance himself from the speech. Jansen also served as chair of the Almere audit office for three years.

During the 2017 Dutch general election, Jansen was placed 23rd on the PVV's party list. His party received twenty seats – not enough for Jansen to become an MP. However, when Sietse Fritsma vacated his seat in 2019, Jansen was appointed as his successor. He subsequently resigned from his positions as municipal councillor and member of the states-provincial. His term in the House ended after he lost re-election in the 2021 general election, and he returned to the municipal and provincial councils afterwards. Following 2023 provincial elections, the PVV joined the governing coalition and Jansen became a member of the Provincial Executive of Flevoland. He left the body the following year to become State Secretary for Public Transport and the Environment in the Schoof cabinet on 2 July.

== Early life and business career ==
Jansen was born on 27 October 1966 in Bussum to an Indonesian mother. He has one older brother. After his education, he worked for about 20 years in the telecommunications and IT industries. During the last of these years, Jansen was a sales manager.

== Local and provincial politics ==
=== Almere municipal council ===
Jansen has told that he decided to become involved in politics in 2009 as a result of the first trial of Geert Wilders, which Jansen regarded as a trial against the freedom of speech. He first ran for political office during the 2010 municipal elections in the city Almere, where he was on place seven on the PVV's party list. The Party for Freedom participated in the elections in two municipalities in the Netherlands, marking the first time the party took part in any municipal election. Jansen received 179 preferential votes and became a member of the council in March, as his party won a plurality of 9 out of 39 seats. However, his party did not become part of the coalition that makes up the executive board.

During the next municipal election in 2014, Jansen was re-elected as the second person on the PVV's party list, while the party remained the largest party with again nine seats. During election night, party leader Geert Wilders gave a speech during which he controversially asked the crowd whether they would want more or fewer Moroccans, resulting in a "fewer, fewer, fewer" chant. All PVV councilmen in Almere except for Jansen distanced themselves from Wilders' statements a few days later, causing Jansen to declare in an interview on Radio 1 Journaal that he was the only PVV councilman left in Almere and that the other eight would have to continue under a different party name. He was subsequently expelled from the municipal PVV caucus because of those statements and because the caucus leader said Jansen was following his own course. Two days later, the caucus made up with Jansen, and he became a member again. Later that year, in August, he became the chairman of the municipal audit office.

At the start of 2016, he called Mayor Franc Weerwind a "wally" (flapdrol) on Twitter after he had decided to not prohibit a meeting that included two controversial Islamic preachers. Subsequently, a local party called for Jansen's removal as chair of the audit office. Another reason for this was that Jansen had incorrectly suggested the year before that a former alderman was pressured by civil servants not to cooperate in an audit office investigation. Jansen had already acknowledged he had been wrong and had apologized to the municipal council. He was not dismissed as not enough support for the move existed. Usually a term as chair lasts two years, but Jansen remained in the position until 2017, as an investigation was still ongoing.

Jansen ran again for councilor during the 2018 municipal election and was re-elected for a third term as the fourth person on the party list. However, his party slid down to become the third biggest party in Almere, receiving 6 out of an increased 45 seats. Because of his position as party leader in Flevoland, Jansen was also involved in finding candidates for his party for other municipalities in his province. During the formation of the executive board of the North Holland city Den Helder, Jansen was proposed as finance alderman. However, a local party dropped out of the formation at the last moment, and a coalition without the PVV was made. He vacated his seat in the Almere municipal council during his third term in January 2019 after being appointed member to the House of Representatives. After his term in the House had ended, Jansen successfully ran for municipal councilor again in the 2022 municipal elections as the PVV's fourth candidate. He was sworn in on 30 March. He stepped down on 29 June of the following year, when he was appointed to the Flevoland provincial executive.

Besides serving in the Almere council, Jansen has served for a number of years on the seven-member executive board of the Flevoland branch of the Association of Dutch Municipalities. His last year on the board was 2015.

=== States and Provincial Executive of Flevoland ===
Jansen became a member of the States of Flevoland in March 2011, remaining in his position as councilman as well. He won his seat during the 2011 Dutch provincial elections, being placed third on the party list. The Party for Freedom came in third in Flevoland, receiving six seats. Jansen became the PVV's party leader in the States in June 2013, after his predecessor Joram van Klaveren resigned because he could no longer combine the position with his membership of the House of Representatives.

Jansen was the lijsttrekker of the Party for Freedom in Flevoland during the 2015 Dutch provincial elections, when his party received six seats – only fewer than the VVD. Again, the PVV did not become part of the provincial-executive after the VVD had said they would not include the PVV in the formation talks if Jansen would not distance himself from Wilders' speech that included a "fewer, fewer, fewer" chant. Jansen refused to meet this demand. The coalition that was formed fell in February 2018, because three of its four members resigned after they lost confidence in their fourth member, Ad Meijer (SP). Before that, the former three had tried to remove Meijer through a motion of no confidence in the States of Flevoland. However, not enough parties voted in favor. Jansen's party was among the parties that voted against the motion to cause, in his words, "maximal damage to the executive council". He later called the failure of the motion a "dream scenario", as it had resulted in the fall of executive. When the Van Geel Commission came out with its advice about the surplus of large herbivores in the nature reserve Oostvaardersplassen later in 2018, Jansen opposed the proposed shooting of animals and instead advocated using birth control to decrease the population.

In March 2019, Jansen was re-elected during the provincial elections, being again the party's lijsttrekker. The PVV became the third biggest party, winning four seats in total. He vacated his seat on 28 January 2020 after he had become an MP. After his membership of the House had ended, Jansen returned to the States of Flevoland on 13 October 2021 to fill the consecutive temporary vacancies of Jan Meindert Keuter and Irene Joosse, and he returned as the PVV's caucus leader. Following plans to build a registration center for asylum seekers in Bant – located in the province – Jansen filed a motion speaking out against any such center in Flevoland. It was carried by a narrow majority, and the Central Agency for the Reception of Asylum Seekers (COA) halted its plans days later.

Jansen sought another term in March 2023 provincial elections as his party's lijsttrekker. He was re-elected, while the PVV lost one of its four seats. The PVV became part of the coalition alongside the BBB, VVD, Christian Union, and SGP, and Jansen vacated his seat to become a Deputy for Economic Affairs and Higher Education in the provincial executive on 29 June 2023. When asked in the confirmation hearing about earlier ant-Islamist statements, Jansen replied he would not distance himself from them but promised to stop making them as a deputy.

== National politics ==
During the 2017 Dutch general election, Jansen was on place 23 on the party list of the Party for Freedom. His party won twenty seats and he personally received 382 preferential votes, the majority of which came from his home province of Flevoland. The result was not sufficient to become a member of the House of Representatives. Jansen was also on place nine on the party list for the 2019 Dutch Senate election, but the PVV received only five seats.

=== House of Representatives (2019–2021) ===
In October 2019, MP Sietse Fritsma stepped down to start a business, resulting in Jansen becoming a member of the House of Representatives. Jansen was sworn in on 27 November 2019 and he indicated that he planned to resign from his other political positions. Two people in front of Jansen in the line of succession, Karen Gerbrands and Robert Housmans, turned down the position; Gerbrands had resigned from the position of MP the year before and had criticized the party, and Housmans refused because he had recently become a member of the provincial-executive of Limburg. In the House of Representative, Jansen was the PVV's spokesperson in the area of health care together with Fleur Agema, and he was a member of the parliamentary Committee for Health, Welfare and Sport and of the Petitions Committee.

When the first cases of COVID-19 were confirmed in the Netherlands in 2020 during the pandemic, Jansen criticized the government for not taking enough precautions to stop the virus. He pointed at the fact that other European countries had taken more action and said Minister for Medical Care Bruno Bruins should think ahead instead of solely listening to experts. Besides, he accused the cabinet of withholding possible scenarios.

Jansen unsuccessfully ran for re-election in the 2021 general election as the PVV's 21st candidate. His party won 17 seats, and Jansen's 338 votes were not enough to meet the preferential-vote threshold.

=== Schoof cabinet ===
After the PVV, VVD, NSC, and BBB formed the Schoof cabinet, Jansen was sworn in as State Secretary for Public Transport and the Environment on 2 July 2024. His portfolio includes the environment (excluding climate), soil, (international) public transport, cycling policy, sustainable transport, KNMI, ANVS, and PBL. When asked in a Goedemorgen Nederland interview, Jansen stated that he still supported Wilders's 2014 speech about wanting fewer Moroccan people. However, he distanced himself from his response shortly after, clarifying that it reflected his personal opinion rather than that of the cabinet, following a rebuke from Prime Minister Dick Schoof. Schoof reiterated to the House of Representatives that cabinet members should refrain from expressing personal opinions.

Fourteen municipalities had been planning to phase in zero-emission zones for commercial vehicles in their city centers over the years 2025–2029. The coalition agreement contained a commitment to postponing their implementation, and a motion by Hester Veltman (VVD) was passed by the House in October 2024 calling on Jansen to exempt commercial vehicles until 2029. Jansen subsequently called on municipalities to not enforce the zones in their first year and to postpone by a year the effective date for the cleanest type of diesel delivery vans. Municipalities did not comply with Jansen's request. In accordance with a ruling by the OSPAR Commission, Jansen classified PFAS as a substance of very high concern, requiring companies to take steps to release these chemical compounds into the environment. He relied on the European Union (EU) to establish further regulations to ban the substance.

== Political positions ==
His municipal positions included creating more housing, increasing the quality of education, and making sports more accessible. During his political career, he has also opposed Islamization and the construction of new mosques in Almere, and he has said he would like the government to revoke passports of criminal immigrants with multiple citizenship.

Jansen has also objected to some forms of or increases in government spending; he has opposed proposals to increase cultural subsidies in Flevoland, was against spending €470 million on the development of Nieuw Land National Park, and has criticized environmental subsidies leading to the construction of many windmills in the province. He has acknowledged the existence of climate change, but called it a natural process that has been going on throughout history and has denied human activity as a major cause, contradicting the scientific consensus on climate change. Jansen has also called measures to address climate change including the energy transition too expensive.

Furthermore, he has asked for more transparency in the public financing of the exposition Floriade 2022, planned to be held in Almere. He has also accused the municipality of including part of the event's costs in other proposals to make the total costs seem smaller.

== Personal life ==
Jansen has a wife and two children. While an MP, he was a resident of Almere, where he had moved to in 1998. He has played soccer, starting in his childhood at the Naarden club NVC.

== Electoral history ==
Electoral history of Chris Jansen
Year	Body	Party	Pos.	Votes	Result		Ref.
Year	Body	Party	Pos.	Votes	Party seats	Individual	Ref.
2019	Senate	Party for Freedom	9	0	5	Lost	
2021	House of Representatives	Party for Freedom	21	338	17	Lost	
2025	House of Representatives	Party for Freedom	26	233	26	Won	

Political offices
Preceded by Vivianne Heijnen as Minister for the Environment	State Secretary for Public Transport and the Environment; 2024–2025	Incumbent
