= Willem Boutkan =

Dutch politician (born 1955)

Member of the House of Representatives
- In office 6 December 2023 – 11 November 2025

Municipal councillor of Almere
- Incumbent
- Assumed office March 2014
- In office March 1998 – March 2006

Member of the Provincial Council of Flevoland
- Incumbent
- Assumed office 2011

Personal details
- Born: 14 May 1955 (age 71) The Hague, Netherlands
- Party: PVV (2010–present)
- Other political affiliations: VVD (until 2010)
- Education: Lower Technical School (LTS), Scheveningen
- Occupation: Politician

Willem Boutkan (born 14 May 1955) is a Dutch politician and former police officer representing the Party for Freedom (PVV) and until 2010 the People's Party for Freedom and Democracy (VVD).

Between December 2023 and November 2025, he was a member of the House of Representatives. Additionally, he is a municipal councillor of Almere and a member of the Provincial Council of Flevoland.

== Early life and education ==
Boutkan was born in The Hague on 14 May 1955. He studied metalworking at the lower technical school in Scheveningen from 1973 to 1977 before he went on to have several jobs as an officer at the police in Leidschendam, the National Police Corps, and the province of Flevoland. He subsequently worked as a researcher at the Transport Safety Board and the Safety Board.

== Political career ==
Boutkan was a municipal councillor of Almere from March 1998 until March 2006, representing the VVD. After he transitioned to the PVV, he was elected member of the Provincial Council of Flevoland in 2011 and of the municipal council of Almere in March 2014.

At the 2023 House of Representatives elections, Boutkan was elected a member of the House of Representatives. His installation took place on 6 December 2023, and he became the PVV's spokesperson for aviation and environment. He also continued to perform his functions as a municipal councillor and a member of the Provincial Council, which makes him a big earner in parliament. He was not re-elected in October 2025, and his term ended on 11 November.

=== House committees ===
- Committee for the Interior
- Public Expenditure committee
- Committee for Infrastructure and Water Management
- Committee for Housing and Spatial Planning
- Committee for Climate Policy and Green Growth

== Electoral history ==
Electoral history of Willem Boutkan
Year	Body	Party	Pos.	Votes	Result		Ref.
Year	Body	Party	Pos.	Votes	Party seats	Individual	Ref.
2012	House of Representatives	Party for Freedom	43	76	15 / 150	Lost	
2023	House of Representatives	Party for Freedom	30	331	37 / 150	Won	
2025	House of Representatives	Party for Freedom	36	520	26 / 150	Lost	
2026	Almere Municipal Council	Party for Freedom	1	3,761	4 / 45	Won	
