= Lena Micko =

Swedish politician (born 1955)

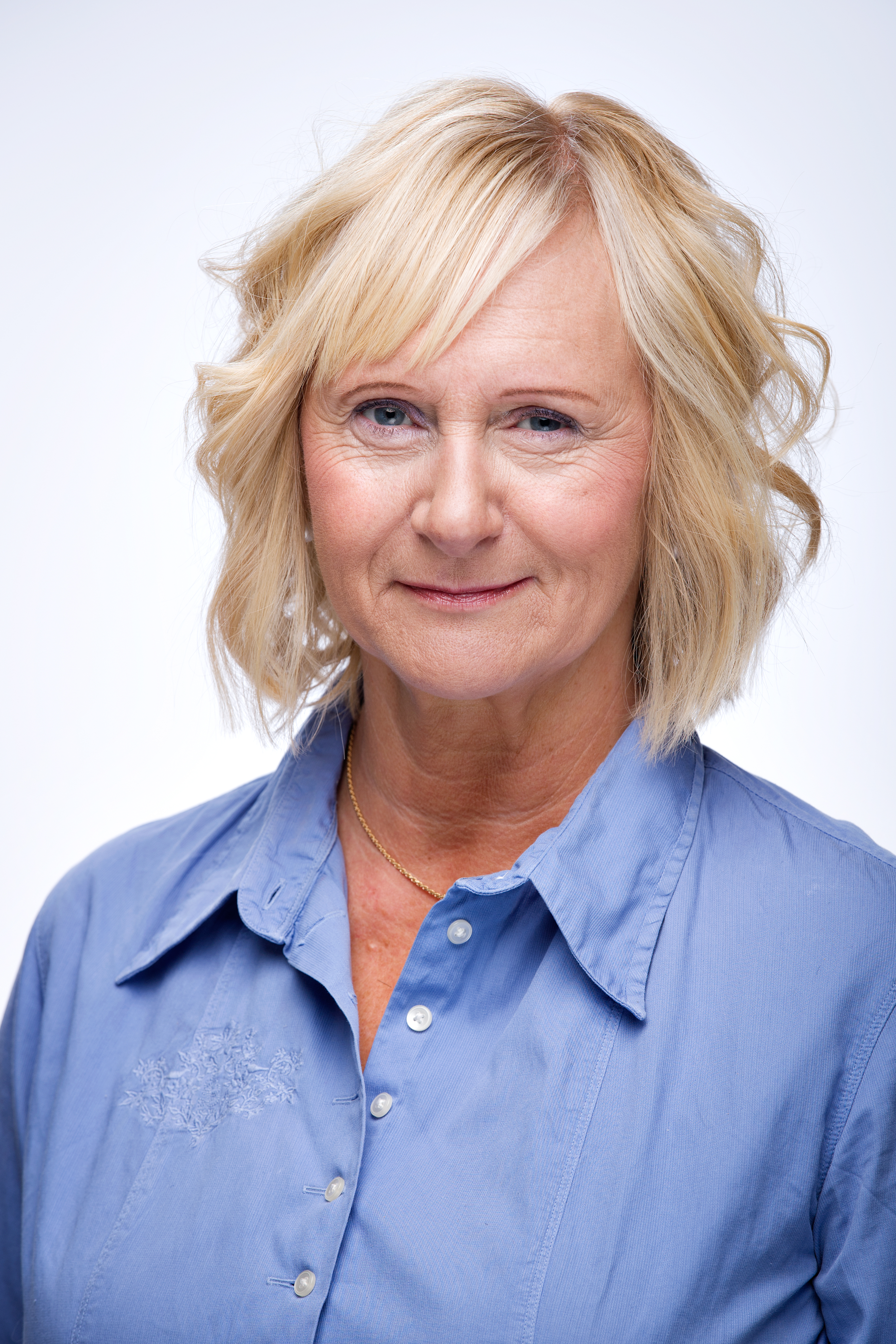

Minister for Public Administration
- In office 1 October 2019 – 30 November 2021
- Monarch: Carl XVI Gustaf
- Prime Minister: Stefan Löfven
- Preceded by: Ardalan Shekarabi
- Succeeded by: Ida Karkiainen

Chairman of the Swedish Association of Local Authorities and Regions
- In office 24 March 2015 – 19 March 2019
- Preceded by: Anders Knape
- Succeeded by: Anders Knape

Mayor of Linköping Municipality
- In office 2014–2015
- Preceded by: Paul Lindvall
- Succeeded by: Kristina Edlund
- In office 2001–2006
- Succeeded by: Paul Lindvall

Personal details
- Born: Lena Mikko; 18 June 1955 (age 70) Umeå, Sweden
- Party: Social Democrats

Lena Micko (born 18 June 1955, officially Eva-Lena Micko) is a Swedish Social Democratic politician from Umeå. She served the Löfven cabinet as Minister for Public Administration from 2019 to 2021. She succeeded Ardalan Shekarabi.

She has previously served as councillor for Linköping Municipality and she was the Chairperson of the Swedish Association of Local Authorities and Regions between 2015 and 2019.
