= Michel Jager =

Dutch politician (1944–2023)

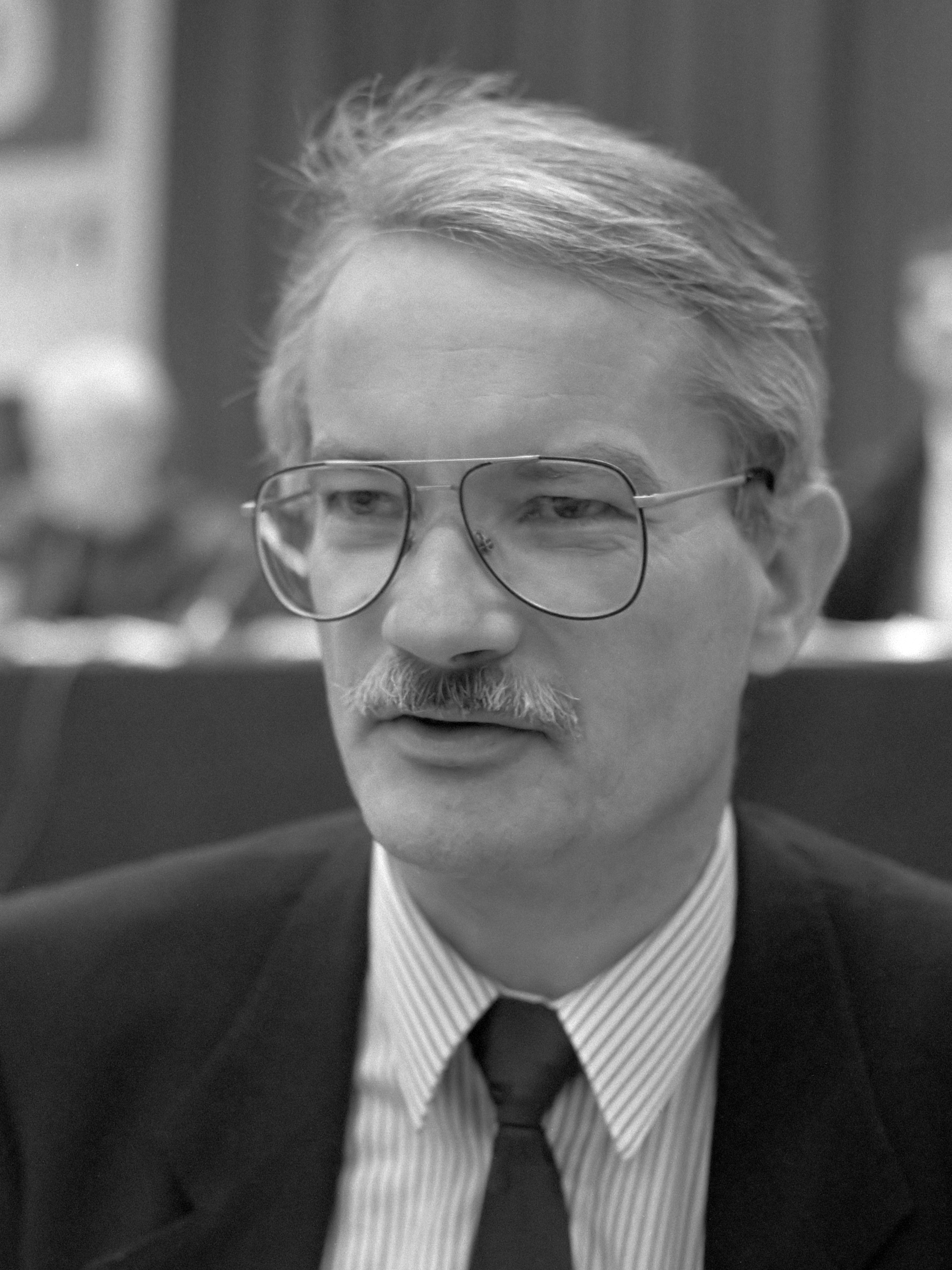
- Jager in 1988

Queen's Commissioner of Flevoland
- In office 16 October 1996 – 1 October 2008
- Monarch: Beatrix
- Preceded by: Han Lammers
- Succeeded by: Leen Verbeek

Personal details
- Born: Michel Jean Emile Marie Jager; 18 August 1944 Helmond, Netherlands
- Died: 15 September 2023 (aged 79) Amsterdam, Netherlands
- Party: Democrats 66
- Education: University of Amsterdam

Michel Jean Emile Marie Jager (18 August 1944 – 15 September 2023) was a Dutch politician. A member of Democrats 66, he served as Queen's Commissioner of Flevoland from 1996 to 2008.

Jager died on 15 September 2023, at the age of 79.
