= Provincial Council of Flevoland =

Provincial council in Flevoland, Netherlands

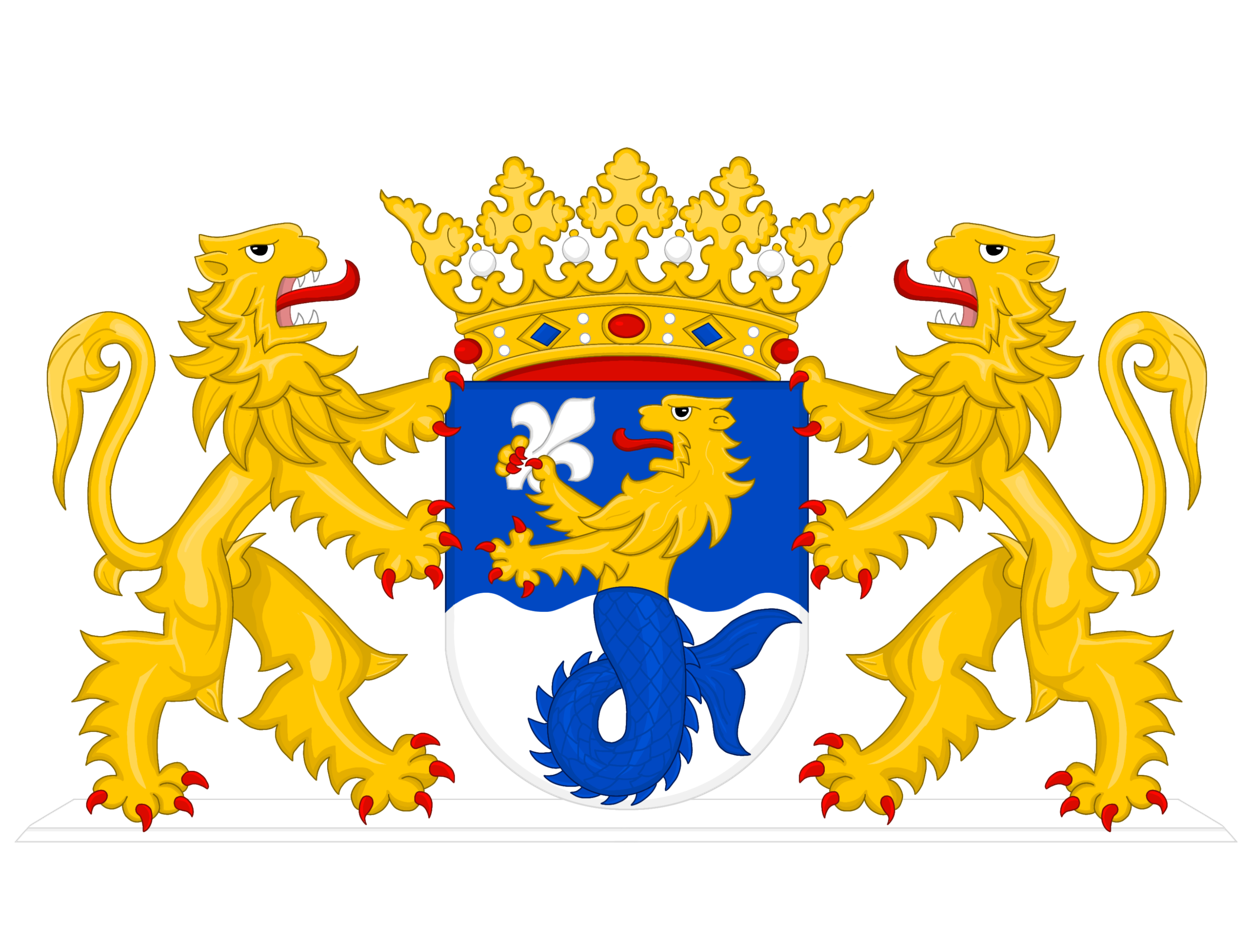
- Coat of arms of Flevoland

Type
- Type: Provincial council

Leadership
- King's Commissioner: Arjen Gerritsen (VVD)
- Secretary: Amanda Kost

Structure
- Seats: 41
- Political groups: Government (21): BBB (10); VVD (4); PVV (3); CU (2); SGP (2); Opposition (19): PRO (5); D66 (2); CDA (2); JA21 (2); PvdD (2); FvD (2); SP (2); SLF (1); 50PLUS (1)

Elections
- Last election: 15 March 2023

Website
- www.flevoland.nl/wie-zijn-we/provinciale-staten

The Provincial Council of Flevoland (Dutch: Provinciale Staten van Flevoland) are the provincial council for the Dutch province of Flevoland. It forms the legislative body of the province. Its 39 seats are distributed every four years in provincial elections.

== Current composition ==
The results of the 2023 provincial elections were as follows:

Party	Votes	%	+/–	Seats	+/–
Farmer–Citizen Movement	33,987	20.83	New	10	New
People's Party for Freedom and Democracy	16,321	10.00	–3.17	4	–2
Party for Freedom	12,474	7.64	–1.63	3	–1
Labour Party	12,391	7.59	–0.62	3	0
GroenLinks	11,239	6.89	–1.64	3	–1
Christian Union	9,620	5.89	–1.14	2	–1
Democrats 66	9,255	5.67	+0.78	2	0
Christian Democratic Appeal	8,277	5.07	–3.24	2	–1
JA21	7,571	4.64	New	2	New
Party for the Animals	7,423	4.55	+0.17	2	0
Forum for Democracy	7,343	4.50	–13.29	2	–6
Socialist Party	6,915	4.24	–1.59	2	0
Reformed Political Party	6,835	4.19	+0.35	2	+1
Strong Local Flevoland	4,518	2.77	New	1	New
50PLUS	4,048	2.48	–2.45	1	–1
Powerful Flevoland	2,879	1.76	New	0	New
BVNL	2,104	1.29	New	0	New
Total	163,200	100.00	–	41	–
Valid votes	163,200	99.36			
Invalid votes	457	0.28			
Blank votes	588	0.36			
Total votes	164,245	100.00			
Registered voters/turnout	313,632	52.37	–1.22		
Source: Kiesraad

== See also ==
- Provincial politics in the Netherlands
