= Ian Micallef =

Maltese politician (born 1969)

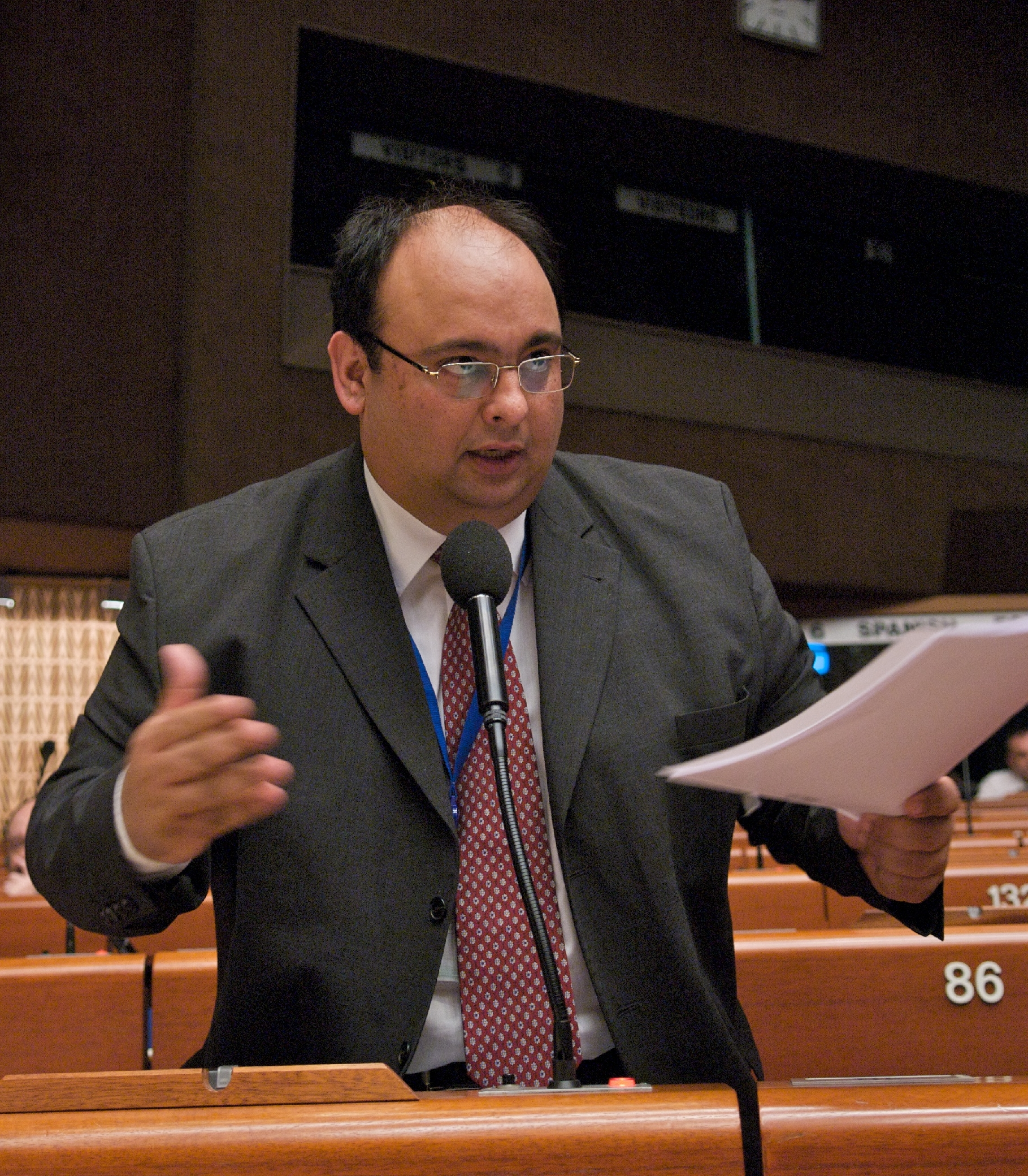
Ian Micallef, President of the Local Chamber of the Congress

Ian Micallef (born 6 September 1969, Gzira, Malta) is the former President of the Chamber of Local Authorities of the Congress of the Council of Europe. He was elected to that position in May 2006 and re-elected on 27 May 2008 for a two-year period; he was also Acting President of the Congress from December 2008 to October 2010. He is the second son of George Micallef (born 20 March 1943, Gzira, Malta) and Maria Micallef (born Maria Armeni, 14 August 1945, Pieta, Malta).

A specialist in European law, Micallef served as a municipal councillor for Gzira, in Malta, between 1994 and 2012; he acted as Chair of the Association of Local Councils of Malta between 1996 and 2012.

Micallef's international political career started in 1996, after he led the Maltese delegation to the Congress of the Council of Europe. Since 2000, he has been an executive member of the Commonwealth Local Government Forum and since 2002, he has sat on the Venice Commission's Council for Democratic Elections. In May 2004, he was elected as Vice-President of the Congress of the Council of Europe, where he is a member of the European People's Party group.

Micallef is a former Vice-President of the Committee of the Regions of the European Union; he has taken part in the organisation and planning of several key international conferences at the Council of Europe and has been responsible for reports on the situation of local democracy in several Council of Europe member states, including the United Kingdom and Sweden. He also chairs the institutional committee of COPPEM.
