= Cecilia Dalman Eek =

Swedish politician (born 1960)

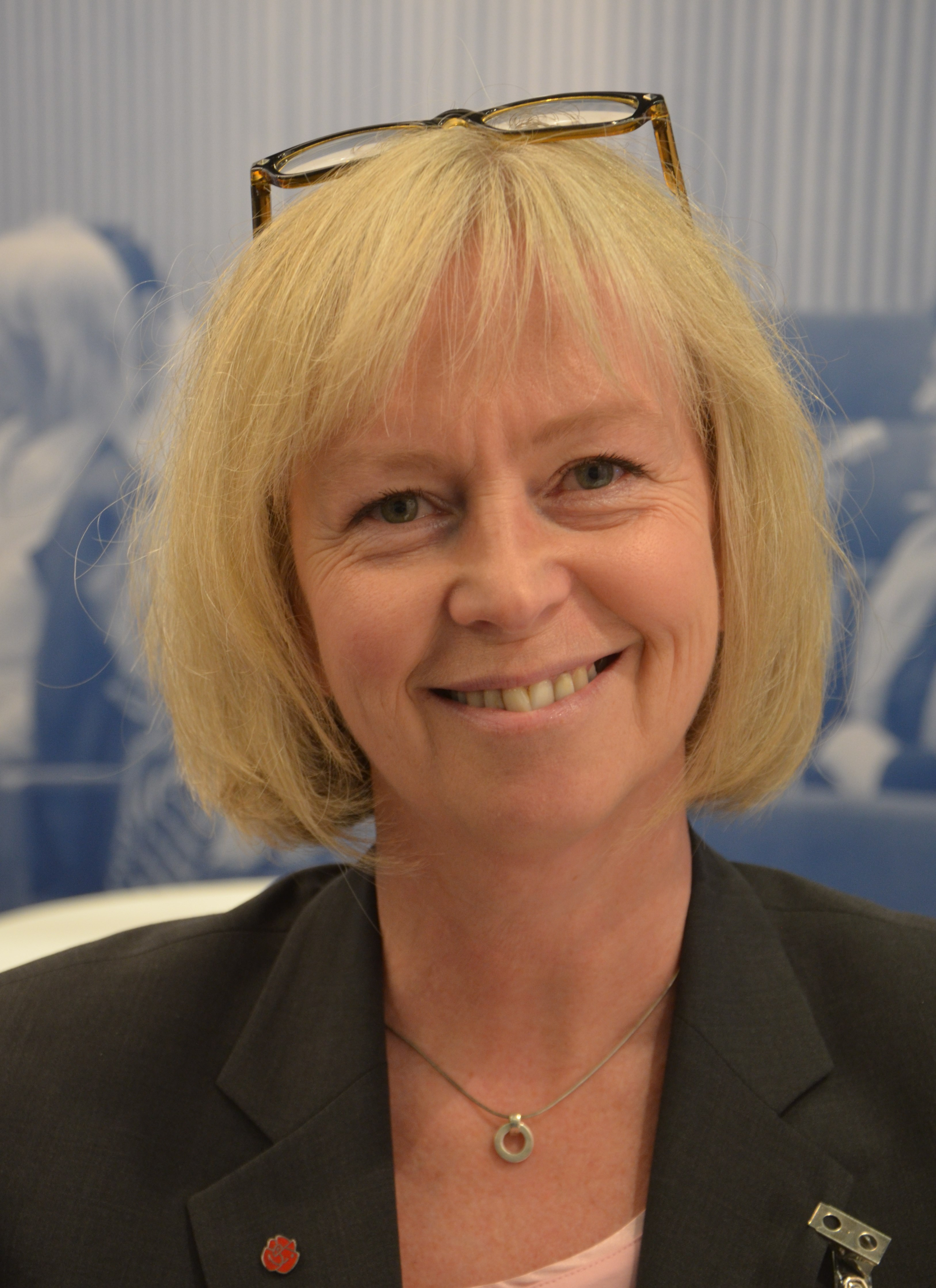
- Dalman Eek in September 2013

Member of the Riksdag
- In office 4 October 2012 – 29 September 2014
- Preceded by: Leif Pagrotsky
- Constituency: Gothenburg Municipality

Personal details
- Born: 1960 (age 65–66)
- Party: Social Democratic Party

Marie Cecilia Dalman Eek (born 1960) is a Swedish politician and former member of the Riksdag, the national legislature. A member of the Social Democratic Party, she represented Gothenburg Municipality between October 2012 and September 2014. She is a member of the Council of Europe's Chamber of Regions.
