= Yavuz Mildon =

Turkish politician (born 1955)

Yavuz Mildon (born 1 June 1955 in Turkey) is a Turkish politician of the Justice and Development Party (AK Party) and the former president of the Congress of the Council of Europe, of which he remains an honorary member.

== Early life ==
Since he graduated in economics from the University of Istanbul, Yavuz Mildon has worked in the food-processing sector. He runs the Mildon Fish and Shellfish Company in Gelibolu, Çanakkale in the Marmara Region and is owner of a seafood export company. From 1988 to 1992 he was president of the Gelibolu Chamber of Commerce.

== Career ==
Mildon’s political career began when he was elected to the Provincial Council of Canakkale in the 1994 local elections. He became a member of the Congress of the Council of Europe in 1995 and served as President of its Chamber of Regions from 2004 to 2008 and as its President of Congress from May 2008 to October 2010, when he was succeeded by Keith Whitmore. He was also the head of the Turkish delegation to the Congress. Due to Mildon’s health problems, Ian Micallef served as acting President of the Congress from January 2009 to October 2010.

Mildon stood in the March 2009 local elections and was elected to the Provincial Council of the Sultangazi district of Istanbul (Sultangazi ilçesinden İl Genel Meclis). In August 2009, he made his first public appearance since December 2008, when he received a visit from the mayor of Sultangazi.

In 2016 the Congress presented him with a medal. By then he was an honorary member.

He is married with two children.
