= Han Lammers =

Dutch journalist and politician (1931-2000)

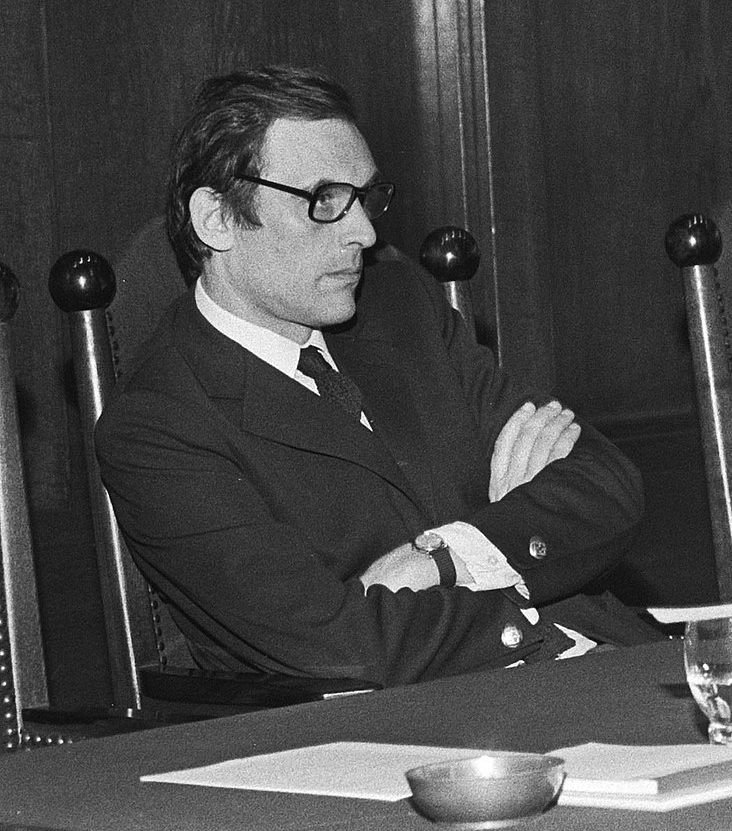
- Lammers in 1971

Queen's Commissioner of Flevoland
- In office 1 January 1986 – 1 October 1996
- Monarch: Beatrix
- Preceded by: Position established
- Succeeded by: Michel Jager

Mayor of Almere
- In office 1 January 1984 – 1 January 1986
- Preceded by: Position established
- Succeeded by: Cees de Cloe

Landdrost of the Southern IJsselmeerpolders
- In office August 1976 – 1 January 1984
- Preceded by: Jan Lindhout
- Succeeded by: Peter de Jonge

Alderman of Amsterdam
- In office 1 September 1970 – 7 January 1976

Personal details
- Born: Johannes Christiaan Jan Lammers; 10 September 1931 Amsterdam, Netherlands
- Died: 5 July 2000 (aged 68) Alkmaar, Netherlands
- Party: Labour Party
- Spouse(s): Carolina Elisabeth Euwe (m. 1956; div. 1961) Carla van der Waerden (m. 1966)

Johannes Christiaan Jan ("Han") Lammers (10 September 1931 – 5 July 2000) was a Dutch journalist and politician who served as the first Queen's Commissioner of Flevoland from 1986 to 1996. A member of the Labor Party, he previously served as Mayor of Almere from 1984 to 1986, Landdrost of the Southern IJsselmeerpolders from 1976 to 1984, and as an Alderman of Amsterdam from 1970 to 1976.

== Early life ==
Han Lammers was born as Johannes Christiaan Jan Lammers in Amsterdam on 10 September 1931. He was the only child of Gerrit Jan Lammers and Maria Evertje van Dreven. The first few years of his life were spent in Amsterdam; his family later moved to The Hague in 1936. After his father's arrest in 1941, Lammers and his mother moved to Aalten, where he attended school and took organ lessons, later becoming one of his greatest passions. Lammers and his family returned to The Hague following the end of the German occupation of the Netherlands, where he attended the Christelijk Gymnasium, graduating in 1951. Lammers had originally intended to study theology, but abandoned it in favor of journalism in 1953.

== Journalistic career ==
From 1955 to 1964, Lammers worked as a journalist at multiple newspaper institutions, including the Algemeen Nederlands Persbureau and the Algemeen Dagblad. From 1964, Lammers served on the editorial board of De Groene Amsterdammer. Lammers was known to be very critical of abuse of power within the Netherlands, criticizing institutions, the royal family, and the parliament. He accused the government of being inadequately democratic, and having lost touch with its citizens.

=== Views on Socialism and the GDR ===
Lammers was in favor of socialism, and joined the Labor Party in 1966. There he founded the New Left, which sought to bring a renewal to the party. This movement brought radical new ideas, such as the unconditional recognition of the GDR, a proposal for the Netherlands to withdraw from NATO, and the proposal for the Netherlands to become a republic at the end of Queen Juliana's reign.

Lammers was an outspoken supporter of the German Democratic Republic (GDR), and publicly defended its communist government. Lammers held great sympathy for the GDR, viewing it as having broken rigorously from its Nazi past. He was a member of the Vereniging Nederland-DDR, an organization which advocated for the recognition of the GDR.

== Political career ==
=== Alderman of Amsterdam ===
On 1 September 1970, Lammers became the Alderman for Art Affairs and Urban Development within the executive board of Amsterdam. This came not long after Lammers was removed from the editorial board of De Groene Amsterdammer in 1969 for his increasingly political commentaries. As an Alderman, Lammers was determined to revitalize Amsterdam through urban development. In particular, he focused greatly on metro construction, drawing out plans for the demolition of whole residential areas to complete this task. Residents fiercely resisted Lammers' plans, ultimately culminating in the Nieuwmarkt riots in 1975. Despite this, Lammers continued the construction of the metro system. Hope for the continuation of his project was diminished after his own supporters turned against him, and Lammers eventually stepped down from his position in 1976.

=== Later Positions ===
In August 1976, Lammers was appointed as Landdrost of the Southern IJsselmeerpolders. At the time, the Southern IJsselmeerpolders were not yet established as municipalities, and were governed instead by an independent public body. Lammers opposed the division of the IJsselmeerpolders into the existing provinces, and instead supported the creation of what would later become the province of Flevoland.

On 1 January 1984 Lammers became the mayor of the new municipality of Almere. As mayor, Lammers sought to develop Almere into a functioning city, and increased the involvement of citizens within the local government.

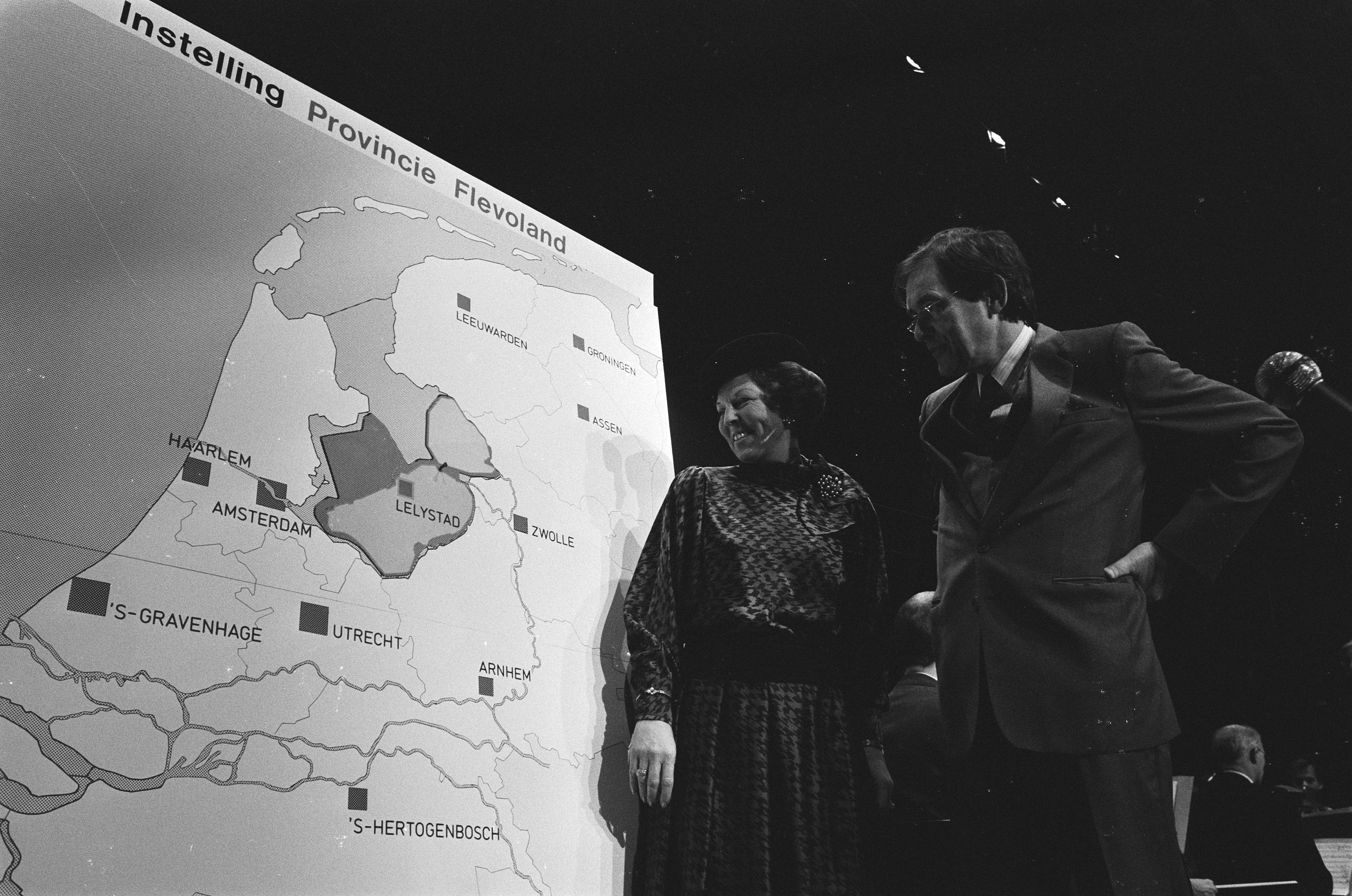
Queen Beatrix and Han Lammers at the proclamation of the province of Flevoland in Lelystad (1986)

==== Queen's Commissioner of Flevoland ====
When Flevoland became a province on 1 January 1986, Lammers took office as its first Queen's Commissioner. He believed that Flevoland would become an important province in relation to the rest of the Netherlands, particularly in its potential to act as a clean slate for spatial planning. Lammers supported the construction of the Markerwaard, a proposed polder to the north of Flevoland, which was ultimately never constructed. As Queen's Commissioner of Flevoland, Lammers promoted the social and economic development of the province as much as possible. He made efforts to improve access to the province from the rest of the Netherlands, and encouraged immigration to Flevoland to further its development.

== Retirement and death ==
On 1 October 1996, Lammers retired as Queen's Commissioner of Flevoland, marking the end to his political career. He was succeeded by Michel Jager. Following his retirement, Lammers devoted his time to playing the organ, but briefly served as the acting mayor of Groningen in 1998. In the spring of 2000, Han Lammers was diagnosed with a brain tumor, and died just a few months later on 5 July, at the age of 68.
