= Paul Lindvall =

Swedish politician (born 1963)

Paul Lindvall (born 1963) is a Swedish Moderate Party politician and leader of the ruling right-center coalition in Linköping. It consists of the Moderate Party, the Liberal People's Party, the Christian Democrats and the Centre Party, together forming a majority in the Municipal Council.

Lindvall became active in the Moderate Youth League while at school in Östergötland. He graduated with a degree in business administration from Linköping University. He then pursued a career in academia. When Sven Lindgren retired from Linköping politics to become governor of Kalmar County, Lindvall became the leading Moderate in Linköping. He failed to win the election in 2002 but succeeded instead to win the local election 2006 in Linköping. Lindvall is now city commissioner, chairman of the city board and leader of the ruling right-center coalition in Linköping. He was re-elected in 2010.
