= List of King's and Queen's commissioners of Flevoland =

This article is a list of King's and Queen's commissioners of the province of Flevoland, Netherlands.

== List of King's and Queen's commissioners of Flevoland ==
Portrait	Name (Lifespan)	Term	Political party	Monarch
	Han Lammers (1931–2000)	1 January 1986 – 1 October 1996	Labour Party	Beatrix (1980–2013)
	Michel Jager (1944–2023)	16 October 1996 – 1 October 2008	Democrats 66	Beatrix (1980–2013)
	Leen Verbeek (born 1954)	1 November 2008 – 31 October 2023	Labour Party	Beatrix (1980–2013)
	Leen Verbeek (born 1954)	1 November 2008 – 31 October 2023	Labour Party	Willem-Alexander (2013–present)
	Arjen Gerritsen (born 1970)	3 November 2023 – Incumbent	People's Party for Freedom and Democracy	Willem-Alexander (2013–present)
