= Arjen Gerritsen =

Dutch politician (born 1970)

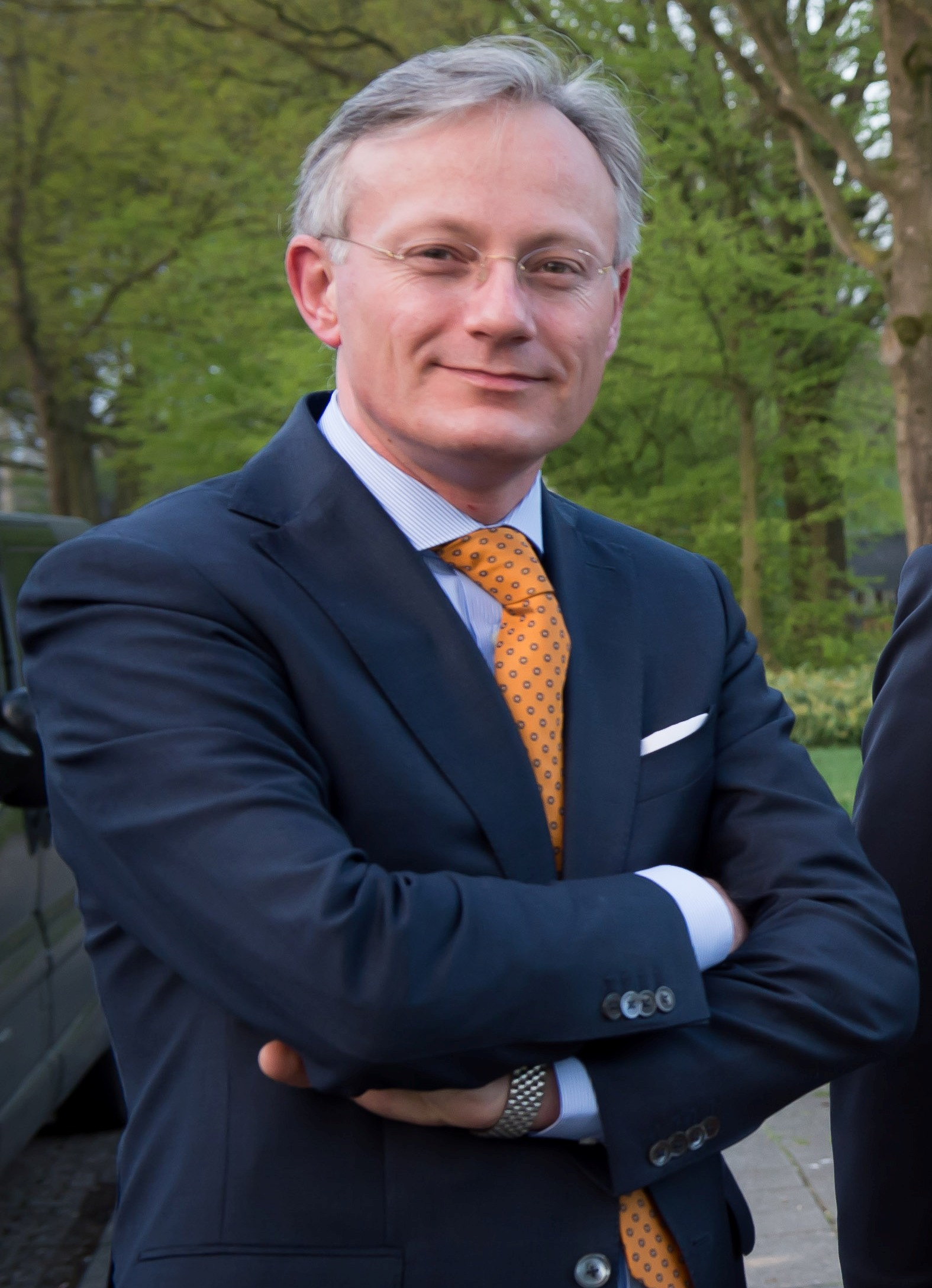
- Gerritsen in 2013

King's Commissioner of Flevoland
- Incumbent
- Assumed office 3 November 2023
- Monarch: Willem-Alexander
- Preceded by: Leen Verbeek

Mayor of Almelo
- In office 2016–2023
- Preceded by: Jon Hermans-Vloedbeld
- Succeeded by: Mirjam van 't Veld

Mayor of De Bilt
- In office 2007–2016
- Preceded by: Alexander Tchernoff
- Succeeded by: Bas Verkerk

Mayor of Haren
- In office 2002–2007
- Preceded by: Nies Gerritsma
- Succeeded by: Mark Boumans

Personal details
- Born: Arend Jan Gerritsen; 13 February 1970 (age 56) Enter, Netherlands
- Party: People's Party for Freedom and Democracy
- Education: Saxion University of Applied Sciences
- Occupation: Politician

Arend Jan "Arjen" Gerritsen (born 13 February 1970) is a Dutch politician who has served as the King's Commissioner of Flevoland since 2023. He is a member of the People's Party for Freedom and Democracy (VVD).

== See also ==
- List of King's and Queen's commissioners of Flevoland

Political offices
Preceded by Nies Gerritsma	Mayor of Haren; 2002–2007	Succeeded by Mark Boumans
Preceded by Alexander Tchernoff	Mayor of De Bilt; 2007–2016	Succeeded by Bas Verkerk
Preceded by Jon Hermans-Vloedbeld	Mayor of Almelo; 2016–2023	Succeeded by Mirjam van 't Veld
Preceded by Leen Verbeek	King's Commissioner in Flevoland; 2023–present	Incumbent
