= Anders Knape =

Swedish politician

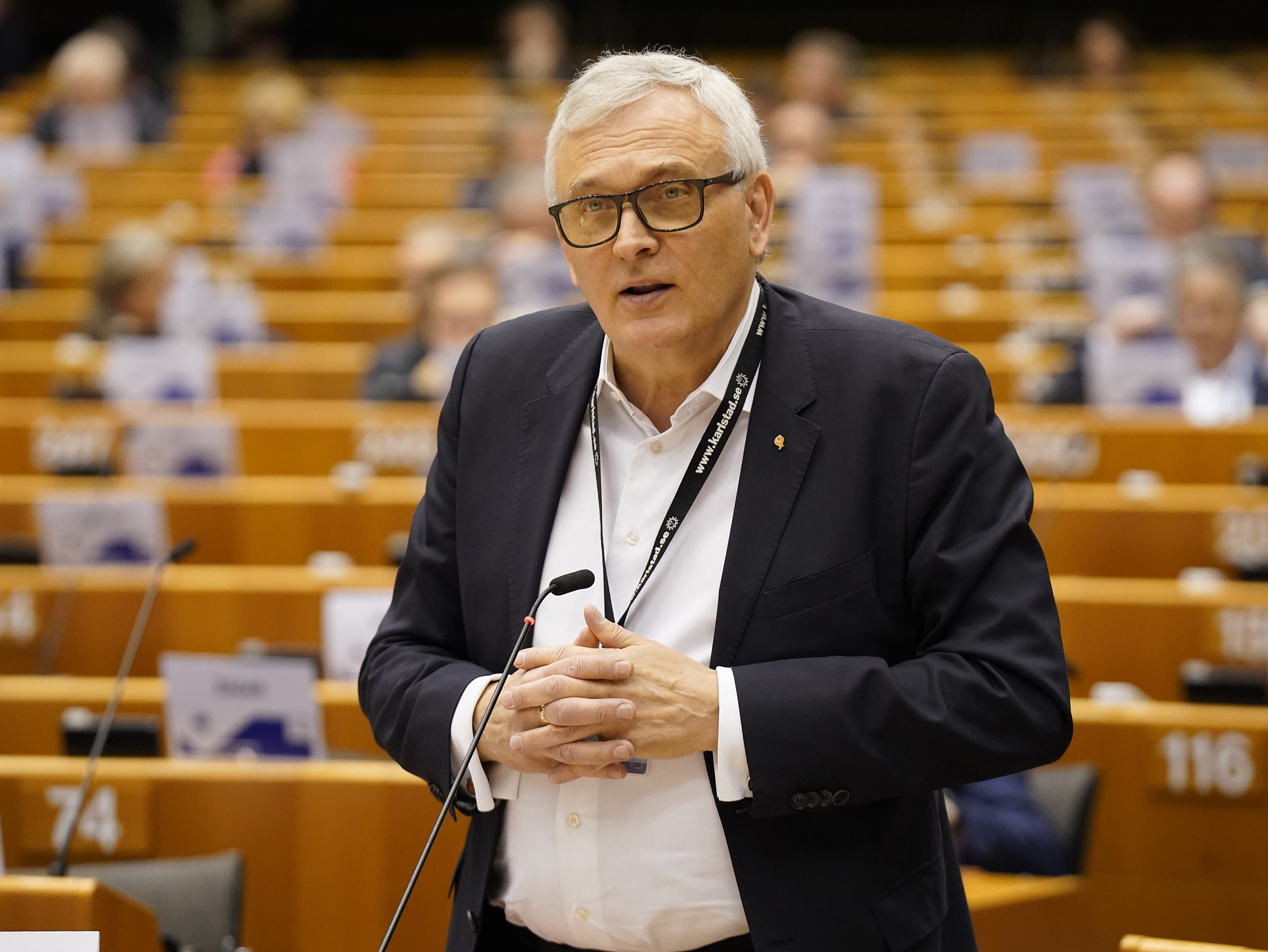

Chairman of the Swedish Association of Local Authorities and Regions
- In office 19 March 2019 – 3 June 2022
- Preceded by: Lena Micko
- Succeeded by: Carola Gunnarsson (acting)
- In office 1 January 2007 – 24 March 2015
- Preceded by: Office created
- Succeeded by: Lena Micko

Mayor of Karlstad Municipality
- In office 2 November 2001 – 31 October 2002
- Preceded by: Lena Melesjö Windahl
- Succeeded by: Lena Melesjö Windahl
- In office 1 November 1991 – 31 October 1994
- Preceded by: Alf Johansson
- Succeeded by: Alf Johansson

Personal details
- Born: Anders Knape; 7 July 1955 (age 70) Karlstad, Värmland County, Sweden
- Party: Moderate Party

Klas Anders Knape (born 7 July 1955 in Karlstad) is a Swedish conservative politician (Moderate Party). He served as the President of the Congress of Local and Regional Authorities (CLRAE) of the Council of Europe between November 6, 2018 and March 23, 2021. He was president of the Swedish Association of Local Authorities and Regions (SALAR), from 2007 to 2015 and again from 2019 to 2022. He was also a councillor of the Karlstad Municipality.

Other current positions are Executive President of the Council of European Municipalities and Regions (CEMR) and Vice President of the Bureau of the Committee of the Regions and president of the Swedish delegation to the Committee of the Regions. He is also the Deputy Head of the Swedish delegation to the CLRAE and a member of the United Cities and Local Governments (UCLG) Executive Bureau and World Council as well as President of the United Nations Advisory Committee of Local Authorities (UNACLA).

Former political positions (a selection)

- Vice President of the Swedish Association of Local Authorities (2000–2007)
- Chairman of the CEMR Working Group on Twinning (2002–2008)
- Mayor and Deputy Mayor of Karlstad Municipality (1988–2007)
- Councillor of Karlstad Municipality (1976–2022)
- Councillor, Värmland County Council (1979–1988)
