= Chamber of Regions =

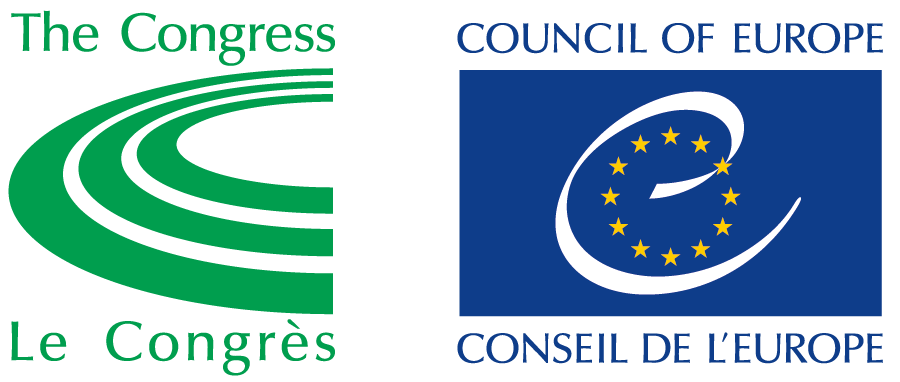
- The logo of the Congress of Local and Regional Authorities
- Headquarters: Strasbourg, France
- Members: 46 member states of the Council of Europe
- Official language: English, French
- Parent organization: Council of Europe
- Website: www.coe.int/en/web/congress/chamber?id=1

The Chamber of Regions is one of the two Chambers of the Congress of Local and Regional Authorities of the Council of Europe, the other being the Chamber of Local Authorities.

The Chamber is the voice of regional authorities in the Council of Europe. It consists of 306 representatives and substitutes from the Council's 46 member states, who either hold regional mandate from elections or are answerable to a directly elected assembly.

According to the Charter of the Congress adopted on 2 May 2007 (revised on 15 January 2020) by the Committee of Ministers, the Chamber's membership is based on the principles of balanced geographical distribution, equitable representation of the various types of regional authorities and their political groups, as well as of equitable representation of women and men, whereby at least 30 per cent of the members must belong to the under-represented sex. The Chamber drafts reports, recommendations, resolutions and opinions on issues of concern and presents them to the Standing Committee of the Congress for adoption. The Chamber elects a President from among its members for two years and appoints a Bureau composed of the President and seven Vice-Presidents.

The Chamber has a permanent Secretariat located at the Palace of Europe, in Strasbourg, which is headed by its Executive Secretary.

The Chamber consists of 306 statutory representatives and substitutes from:

State	Seats	State	Seats	State	Seats	
Albania	2/2	Andorra	1/1	Armenia	2/2	
Austria	3/3	Azerbaijan	3/3	Belgium	3/4	
Bosnia and Herzegovina	2/3	Bulgaria	5/1	Croatia	3/2	
Cyprus	2/1	Czech Republic	4/3	Denmark	3/2	
Estonia	2/1	Finland	3/2	France	9/9	
Georgia	2/3	Germany	9/9	Greece	4/3	
Hungary	4/3	Iceland	3	Ireland	4	
Italy	9/9	Latvia	2/1	Liechtenstein	2	
Lithuania	2/2	Luxembourg	3	Malta	2/1	
Moldova	3/2	Monaco	1/1	Montenegro	3	
Netherlands	4/3	North Macedonia	3	Norway	3/2	
Poland	6/6	Portugal	4/3	Romania	5/5	
San Marino	2	Serbia	4/3			
Slovakia	3/2	Slovenia	3	Spain	6/6	
Sweden	3/3	Switzerland	3/3	Turkey	9/9	
Ukraine	6/6	United Kingdom	9/9	TOTAL		306/306
