= Chamber of Local Authorities =

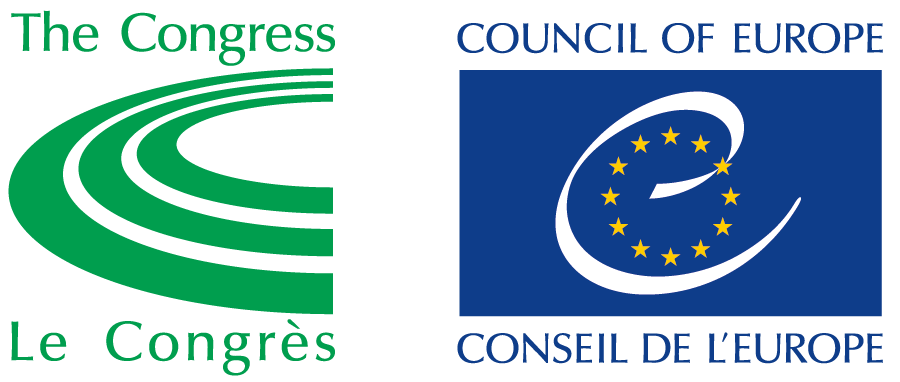
- The logo of the Congress of Local and Regional Authorities
- Headquarters: Strasbourg, France
- Members: 46 member states of the Council of Europe
- Official language: English, French
- Parent organization: Council of Europe
- Website: www.coe.int/en/web/congress/chamber?id=0

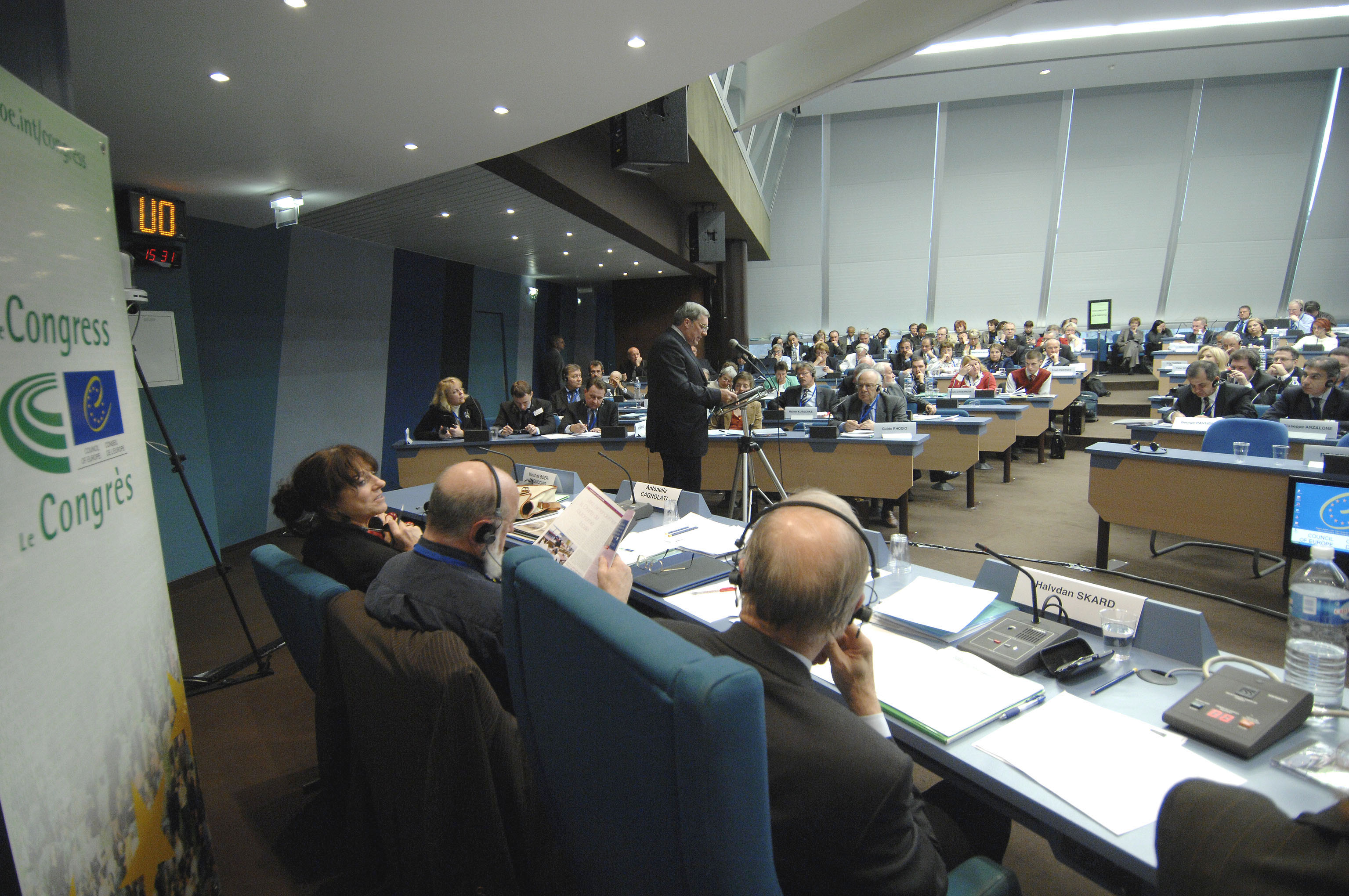
Chamber of Local Authorities in session

The Chamber of Local Authorities is one of the two Chambers of the Congress of Local and Regional Authorities of the Council of Europe. The Chamber is the voice of local authorities (cities and municipalities) in the Council of Europe. It consists of 306 representatives from the Council's 46 member states, who either hold a general local authority mandate from direct elections or are politically accountable to a directly elected assembly. The Chamber provides an opportunity for local officials to discuss common concerns, share their experiences and develop relevant policies.

According to the Charter of the Congress adopted on 15 January 2020 by the Committee of Ministers, the Chamber's membership is based on the principles of balanced geographical distribution, equitable representation of the various types of local authorities and their political groups, as well as of equitable representation of women and men. The Chamber drafts reports, recommendations, resolutions and opinions on the issues of its concern and presents them to the Standing Committee of the Congress for adoption.

== History ==
Prior to the creation of the Congress of Local and Regional Authorities of the Council of Europe in 1994, the Conference of Local and Regional Authorities was in place. The first existence and idea of a body addressing with the issue local government was proposed in 1957 but the standing conference was not created until 1961. This standing conference had existed since 1961. This institutionalisation in 1994 demonstrated the progress and importance of local governance and regional control in the development of Europe. The behavior and actions of the chamber (along with the Chamber of Regions) are based in the European Charter of Local Self-Government which was opened for signature and ratification in 1985.

== Committees ==
In October 2010, the Congress laid out its priorities for 2011-2012 as part of the reform process which included a modification of its committee structure from four statutory committees to three. The four prior existing committees were the Institutional Committee, the Culture and Education Committee, the Committee on Social Cohesion and the Committee on Sustainable Development. The three newly created committees are the Monitoring Committee, the Governance Committee and the Current Affairs Committee. This change was approved in December 2010.

According to the Congress' official website:

=== Monitoring Committee ===
"The Committee on the Honouring of Obligations and Commitments by member states of the European Charter of Local Self-Government - Monitoring Committee - is responsible, in particular, for monitoring the application of the Charter as well as institutional developments in Europe’s regions, for preparing reports on the situation of local and regional democracy in Europe and for monitoring specific questions related to local and regional democracy in the member states."

=== Governance Committee ===
"The Governance Committee is responsible for affairs falling within the scope of the Congress' statutory mandate such as governance, public finance, cross-border and interregional co-operation and e-democracy as well as co-operation with intergovernmental bodies."

=== Current Affairs Committee ===
"The Current Affairs Committee is responsible for studying the role of local and regional authorities with regard to the major challenges of our society and preparing work on thematic issues such as social cohesion, education, culture and sustainable development from the point of view of the Council of Europe's core values."

== The Bureau ==
The Chamber elects its President among its members for two years, and appoints the Bureau composed of the President and seven Vice-Presidents respecting as far as possible a fair geographic distribution among the member states. The actual composition of the Bureau can be seen on the official website of the Congress.

== The Secretariat ==
The Chamber has a permanent Secretariat located at the Palace of Europe in Strasbourg, which is headed by its Executive Secretary, appointed by the Secretary General of the Council of Europe.

== List of Members ==
The Chamber consists of 306 statutory members (representatives and substitutes) from:

State	Members	State	Members	State	Members
Albania	2/2	Andorra	1/1	Armenia	2/2
Austria	3/3	Azerbaijan	3/3	Belgium	3/4
Bosnia and Herzegovina	2/3	Bulgaria	5/1	Croatia	3/2
Cyprus	2/1	Czech Republic	4/3	Denmark	3/2
Estonia	2/1	Finland	3/2	France	9/9
Georgia	2/3	Germany	9/9	Greece	4/3
Hungary	4/3	Iceland	3	Ireland	4
Italy	9/9	Latvia	2/1	Liechtenstein	2
Lithuania	2/2	Luxembourg	3	Malta	2/1
Moldova	3/2	Monaco	1/1	Montenegro	3
Netherlands	4/3	North Macedonia	3	Norway	3/2
Poland	6/6	Portugal	4/3	Romania	5/5
Russian Federation	9/9	San Marino	2	Serbia	4/3
Slovakia	3/2	Slovenia	3	Spain	6/6
Sweden	3/3	Switzerland	3/3	Turkey	9/9
Ukraine	6/6	United Kingdom	9/9		
TOTAL					306/306

Two representatives of local government in Kosovo participate in the work of the Congress as observers.
