= Leen Verbeek =

Dutch politician (born 1954)

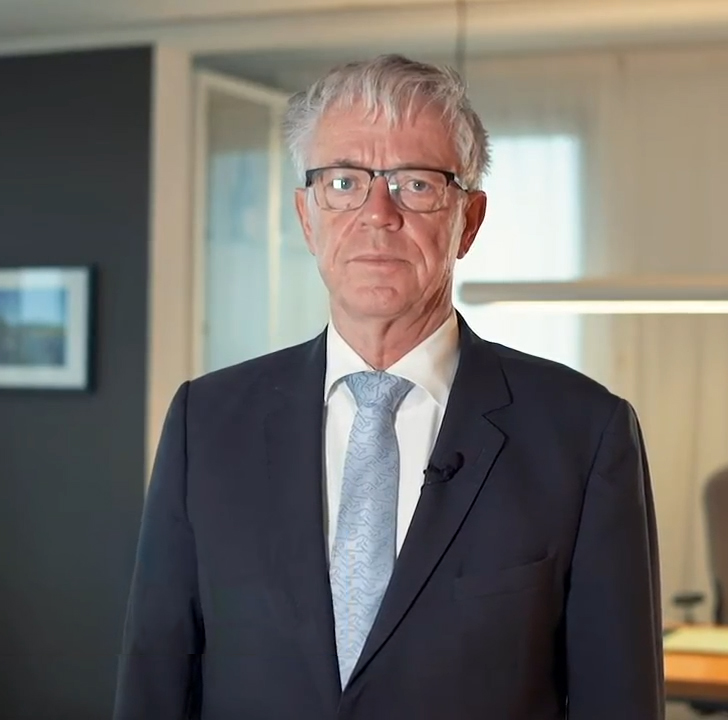
- Verbeek in 2021

King's Commissioner of Flevoland
- In office 1 November 2008 – 31 October 2023
- Monarchs: Beatrix; Willem-Alexander
- Preceded by: Michel Jager
- Succeeded by: Arjen Gerritsen

Mayor of Purmerend
- In office 2 April 2003 – 1 November 2008
- Preceded by: Theun van Dam
- Succeeded by: Fons Hertog

Personal details
- Born: Leendert Verbeek; 5 March 1954 (age 72) Leiderdorp, Netherlands
- Party: Labour Party
- Education: Academy for Educational Labour, Baarn (BA)
- Occupation: Politician, civil servant, social worker
- Website: (in English) Province of Flevoland website

Leendert "Leen" Verbeek (born 5 March 1954) is a Dutch politician, who was serving as the King's Commissioner of Flevoland from 2008 to 2023. A member of the Labour Party (PvdA), he previously served as Mayor of Purmerend from 2003 to 2008.

Verbeek spent his early years in Eindhoven. After the MULO (current-day VMBO) and a year of high school in the United States, he attended the Academy for Educational Labour in Baarn. He then started to work as a youth worker in Leiden.

Ten years later, Verbeek started his political career through political institutions, ending up as an alderman in Houten (1989–96). He was appointed Mayor of Purmerend seven years after he left the political sphere. In between, he was director of a self-created company.

On 18 December 2007, it was announced that Verbeek was a candidate for Mayor of Eindhoven along with Rob van Gijzel. A referendum was held on 23 January 2008, in which Verbeek scored 33% of the votes, but because the required number of voters was not met, the referendum was nullified and the decision was made in-house, which resulted in Van Gijzel being appointed Mayor of Eindhoven. Verbeek was replaced by Fons Hertog as Mayor of Purmerend in November 2008, as Verbeek was appointed the Queen's Commissioner (in 2013 the title changed to King's Commissioner) for the province of Flevoland.

Political offices
Preceded by Theun van Dam	Mayor of Purmerend; 2003–2008	Succeeded by Fons Hertog
Preceded by Michel Jager	King's's Commissioner of Flevoland; 2008–2023	Succeeded by Arjen Gerritsen
