= European Charter of Local Self-Government =

International agreement defining the rights and duties of municipalities and regions

- States party to the Charter
- Signed: 15 October 1985
- Location: Strasbourg
- Effective: 1 September 1988
- Parties: 46 (all Council of Europe member states)
- Depositary: Secretary General of the Council of Europe
- Languages: English and French

Full text
- European Charter of Local Self-Government at Wikisource

The European Charter of Local Self-Government was adopted under the auspices of the Congress of the Council of Europe and was opened for signature by the Council of Europe's member states on 15 October 1985. All Council of Europe member states are parties to the Charter. New member states of the Council of Europe are expected to ratify the Charter at the earliest opportunity.

The Charter commits the ratifying member states to guaranteeing the political, administrative and financial independence of local authorities. It provides that the principle of local self-government shall be recognised in domestic legislation and, where practicable, in the constitution. Local authorities are to be elected by universal suffrage, and it is the earliest legal instrument to set out the principle of subsidiarity.

== The Charter ==
Local authorities, acting within the limits of the law, are to be able to regulate and manage a substantial share of public affairs under their own responsibility in the interests of the local population. The Charter considers that public responsibilities should be exercised preferably by the authorities closest to the citizens, a higher level being considered only when the co-ordination or discharge of duties is impossible or less efficient at the level immediately below. To this end, the Charter sets out the principles concerning the protection of local authorities' boundaries, the existence of adequate administrative structures and resources for the carrying out of their tasks, the conditions under which responsibilities are to be exercised, the financial resources of local authorities and the legal protection of local self-government. It limits the administrative supervision of local authorities' activities to the verification of lawfulness only.

The principles of local self-government contained in the Charter apply to all categories of local authorities. Ratifying states undertake to consider themselves bound by at least twenty paragraphs of Part I of the Charter, including at least ten from among the following:

- Article 2,
- Article 3, paragraphs 1 and 2,
- Article 4, paragraphs 1, 2 and 4,
- Article 5,
- Article 7, paragraph 1,
- Article 8, paragraph 2,
- Article 9, paragraphs 1, 2 and 3,
- Article 10, paragraph 1,
- Article 11.

In 2009, a protocol to the Charter (on the right to participate in the affairs of a local authority) was adopted. It entered into force on 1 June 2012.

The Congress of Local and Regional Authorities has developed a database named "Carta-Monitor". This database provides access to the analysis, article by article, carried out during the Congress's monitoring missions in the 46 Member States. It also allows for comparative analysis on several articles and countries, as well as statistical research on ratifications of articles and compliance with their implementation.

Every report on the application of the Charter in member states or the local elections that the Congress has observed can be consulted on the Congress' web site.

== Group of Independent Experts on the European Charter ==
The Council of Europe has constituted a consultative body called the Group of Independent Experts on the European Charter, consisting of senior academics. The Group meets twice a year to consider a range of matters related to the European Charter of Local Self-Government, and it also provides legal advice and support to the elected members of the Congress of the Council of Europe who undertake a program of missions to monitor the situation of local and regional democracy in member states of the Council.

The Group is currently considering, through a working group, the question of the possible revision of the Charter, in liaison with the Secretariat and the Rapporteur of the Congress.

== Monitoring the Charter ==
=== Role of the Congress ===
Monitoring local and regional democracy is the most symbolic activity of the Congress of Local and Regional Authorities of the Council of Europe. As the voice of cities and regions, the Congress is a unique assembly in Europe, tasked by the Committee of Ministers with ensuring the proper implementation of the European Charter of Local Self-Government. This international convention sets standards to protect the rights of local authorities and commits the member states of the Council of Europe – all of which have ratified it – to respect a number of principles.
