= Gemeenlandshuis van Rijnland =

Historic building in Leiden, Netherlands

Coordinates: 52.1593°N 4.4885°E

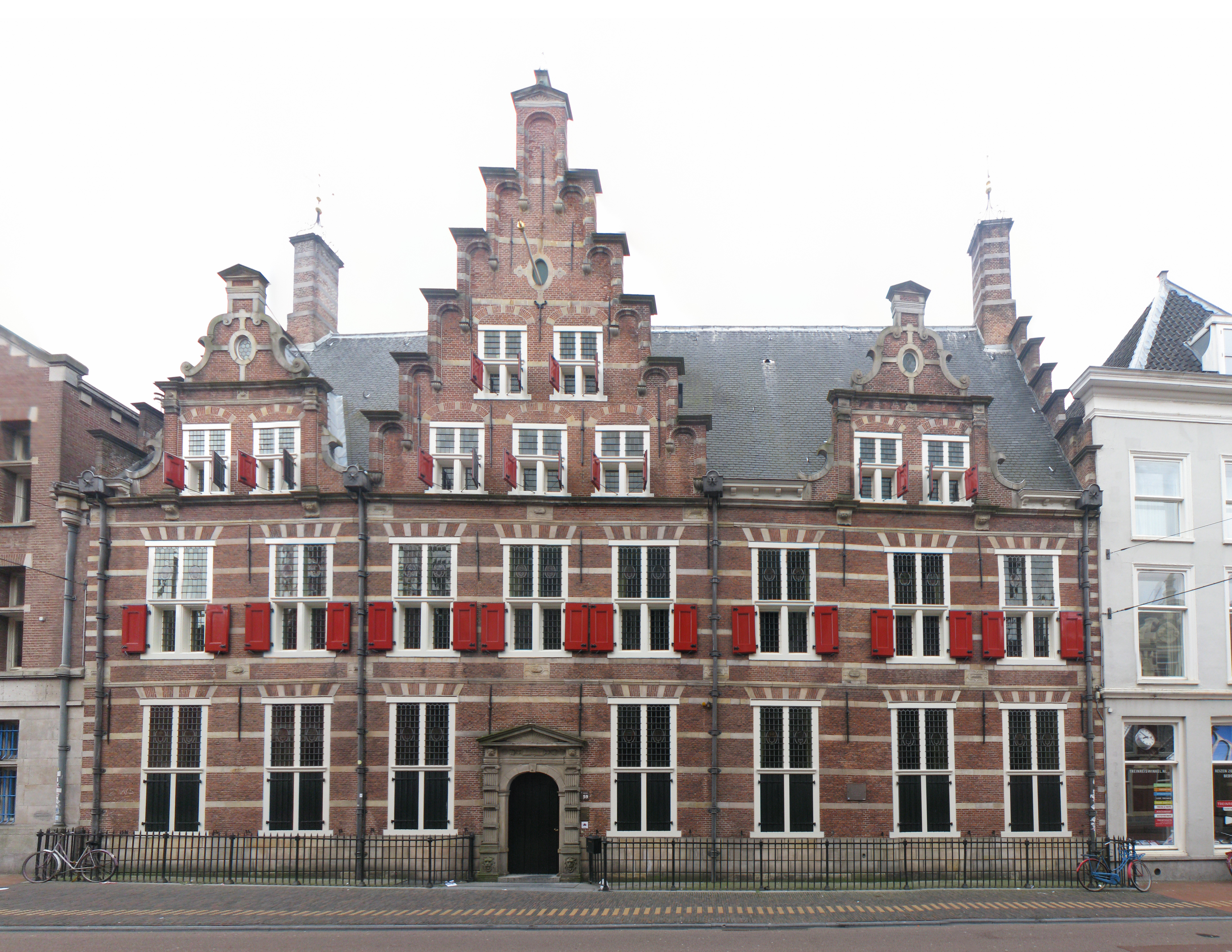
Gemeenlandshuis of the Hoogheemraadschap van Rijnland on the Breestraat in Leiden

The Gemeenlandshuis van Rijnland on the Breestraat in Leiden is the oldest Gemeenlandshuis of the Netherlands that kept its function until the current century. Currently, it is still in use by the Hoogheemraadschap van Rijnland, but only for meetings and special occasions. Their day-to-day seat of water management is housed today on the Archimedesweg in Leiden.

== History ==
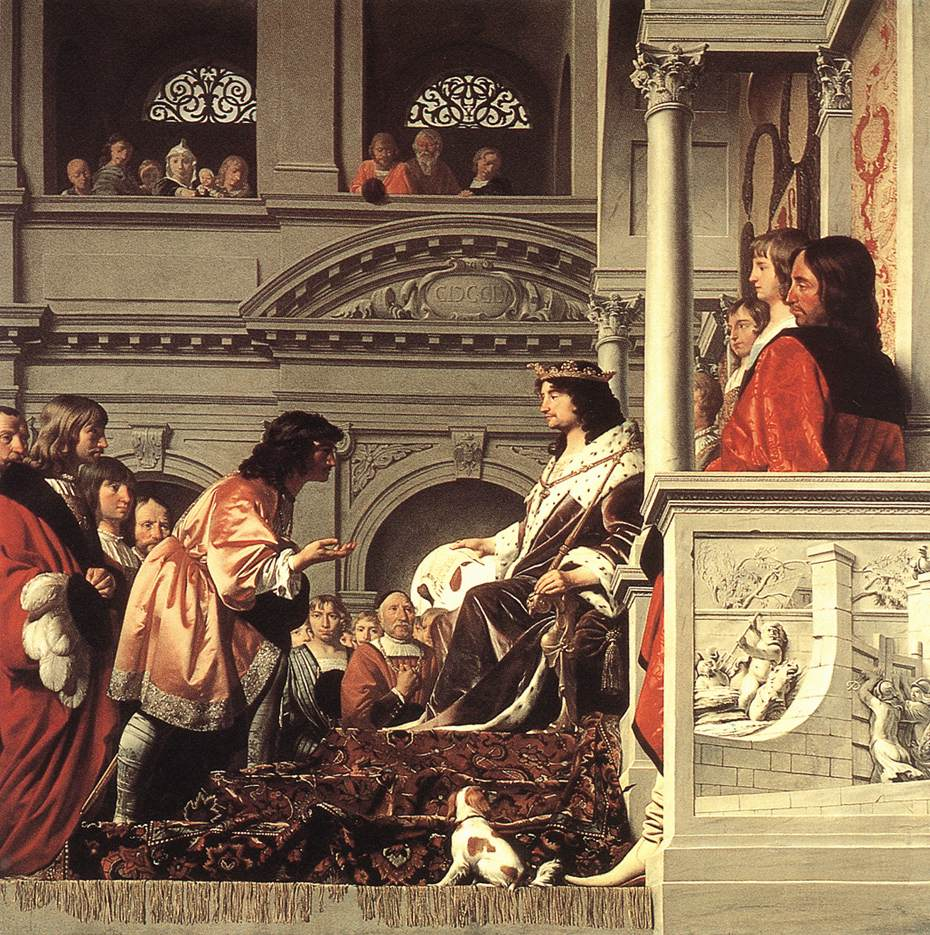
Count William II of Holland Granting Privileges in 1255 to the local Dike-wardens of Spaarndam by Caesar van Everdingen, 1654, originally commissioned for the Gemeenlandshuis Zwanenburg in Halfweg, and today in the collection of the Gemeenlandshuis Rijnland in Leiden.

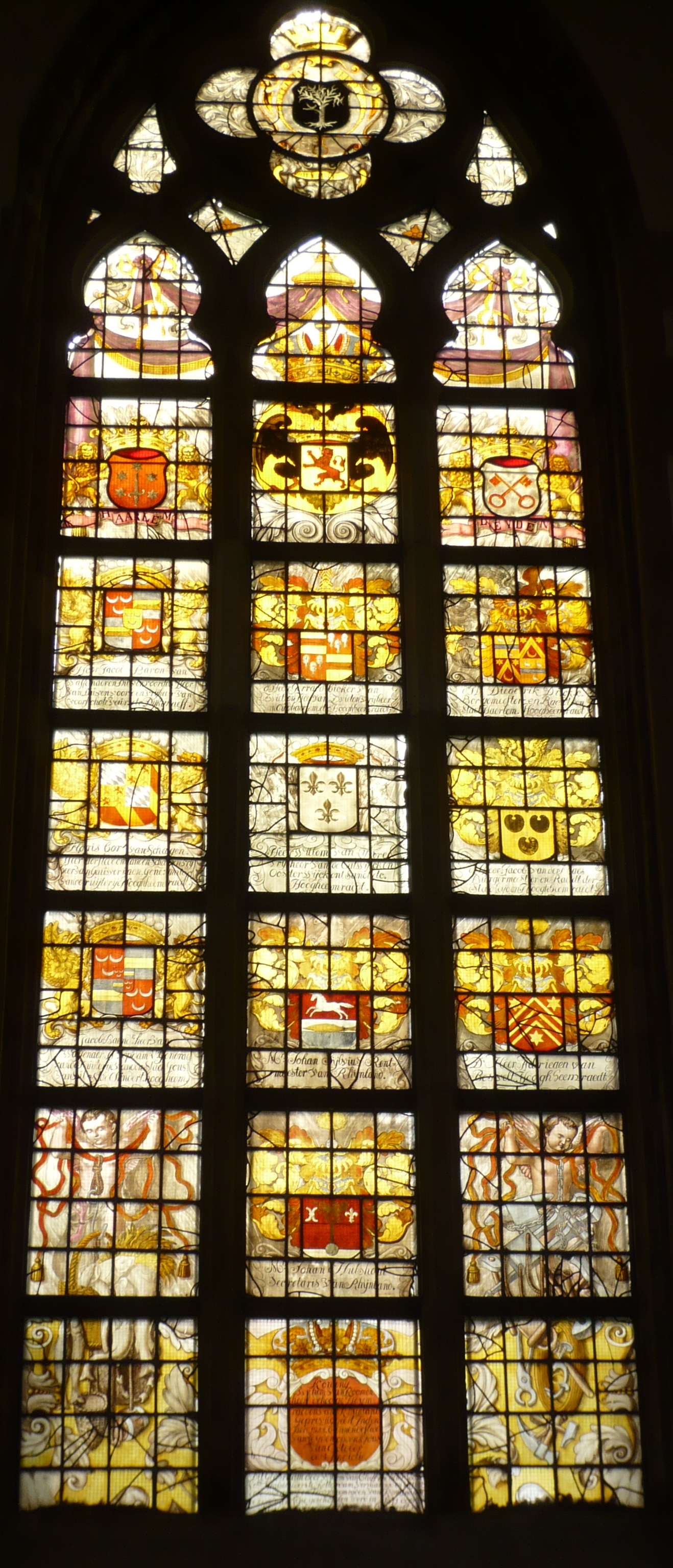
Heraldic shields of the Hoogheemraadschap van Rijnland members in 1691, the year that this church window was donated by the Water Board to the church in Lisse, currently located in the St. Bavochurch.

The first steps towards a formal method of dike management in Leiden were taken according to Ortelius in Brittenburg, making Leiden the oldest place in the Netherlands to conduct water management. The current building was built to house the Hoogheemraadschap that dates from the 12th century when the Oude Rijn river silted shut at Katwijk. In the centuries afterwards, a group of officials called heemraden oversaw the dikes along the IJ, the Zyl, the Does, and the dams at Zwammerdam and Spaarndam. Their privileges were described in a document that was given to the dike wardens at Spaarndam in 1255. This was the subject of a painting by Caesar van Everdingen that hangs in the Gemeenlandshuis Rijnland, the meeting hall purchased in 1578 on the Breestraat.

This building was also the permanent residence of the dijkgraaf (official). The facade was renovated twenty years later in 1598 to keep up with the new town hall. This Gemeenlandshuis is the first one designed for this purpose and financed by the Hoogheemraadschap van Rijnland. The organization later built a new Rijnlandshuis in 1641 at Spaarndam to stay at while inspecting the dam complex there, and another one to meet with the Amsterdam Water Board while inspecting the dikes along the Haarlemmertrekvaart and the sluices at Halfweg. The Gemeenlandshuis Zwanenburg was built by Pieter Post in 1645–1648. The building is nearly demolished today, but a town named after this building in the Haarlemmermeerpolder called Zwanenburg. The grandeur of all three buildings shows the relative wealth of the water board at the time. Besides building these houses, they also financed glass windows for churches and memorials to their members, such as the memorial to Nicolaas Kruik in the church in Spaarndam.

== Modifications to the building ==
The facade was renovated twenty years after purchase in 1598 to keep up with the new Leiden town hall. In the years 1660–1670, the interior was redecorated according to a design by Pieter Post. In the early 19th century, it was painted brown, which caused damage to the brick and resulted in restoration activities in 1882. In 1878 the architect Pierre Cuypers conducted another restoration of the building.

== Gemeenlandshuis today ==
The building is considered one of Rijnland's most valuable buildings and is open to the public each year on Monument Day. It is also available for use for weddings, with its atmosphere similar to an old city hall.
