= Gemeenlandshuis Zwanenburg =

Former headquarters of the Netherlands' water authority

Coordinates: 52.3853°N 4.7473°E

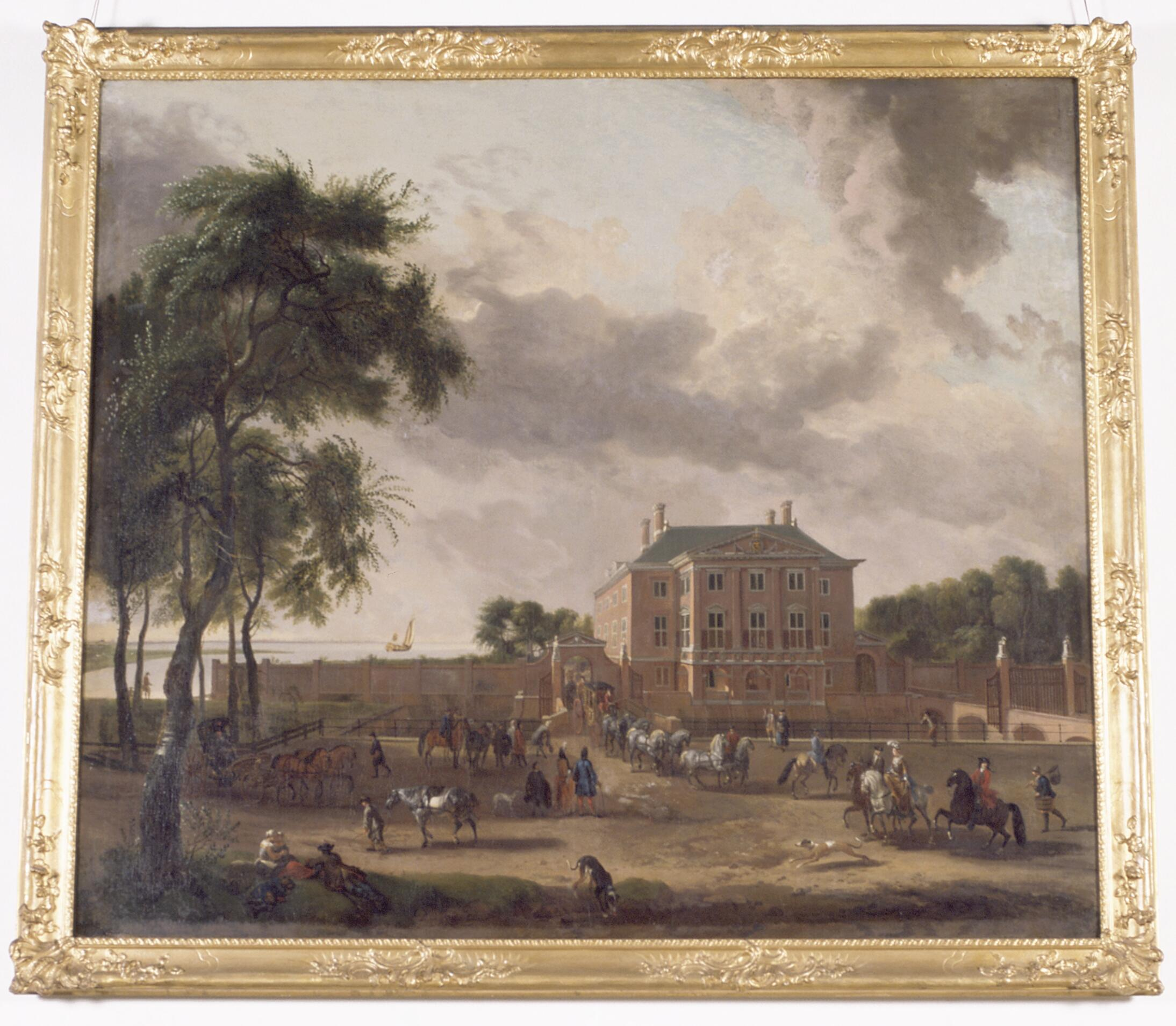
Huis Zwanenburg te Halfweg in 1702, by Dirk Maas

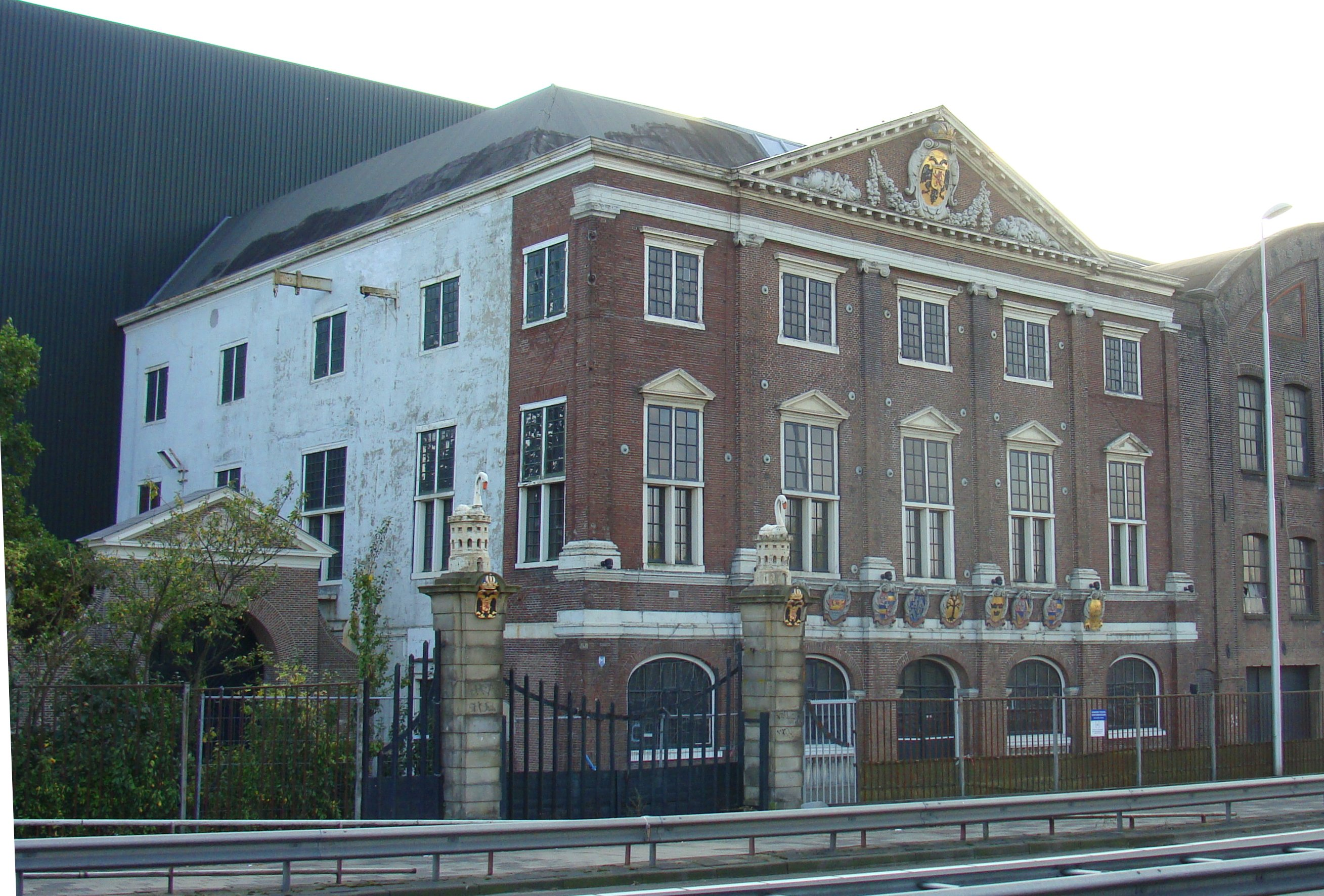
Gemeenlandshuis Zwanenburg today, part of the remnants of the old CSM Sugar factory complex

The Gemeenlandshuis Zwanenburg (Dutch pronunciation: [ɣəˈmeːnlɑntsɦœy ˈsʋaːnə(m)bʏr(ə)x]), located on Haarlemmerstraatweg in Halfweg, is a former Gemeenlandshuis of the Hoogheemraadschap van Rijnland designed by Pieter Post and built 1645–1648.

== History ==
The Hoogheemraadschap van Rijnland built this building as a meeting hall to use for water management of the IJ and the Haarlem Lake in 1645. They had previously built a similar meeting house in 1641 to oversee the dam in Spaarndam. Since 1518 when the Hoogheemraadschap sent men to defend the dam at Spaarndam from troops sent by the rebellious city of Haarlem, the Hoogheemraadschap had met for water management on neutral ground in Leiden. To be able to meet more efficiently during yearly inspection of the dikes, they built meeting halls in strategic locations outside the Haarlem city limits on their own terrain. The Hoogheemraadschap privileges were considered a higher form of government than the Haarlem city rights (awarded to Haarlem in 1245), and were described in a document that was given to the dike wardens at Spaarndam in 1255. This granting of privileges by Count William II of Holland was the subject of a painting by Caesar van Everdingen that was painted as decoration for the meeting hall in Halfweg, and which hangs today in the Gemeenlandshuis van Rijnland, the meeting hall purchased in 1578 on the Breestraat in Leiden.

This building was also the permanent residence of the Halfweg dijkgraaf (official). The duties of the dike warden changed over time and Zwanenburg evolved into a weather station. The Zwanenburg resident Jan Noppen (1706–1734) and his friend and Spaarndam water board colleague Nicolaas Kruik were inspired by the British Royal Society to measure the temperature, air pressure, humidity, and rainfall 3 times daily. They decided to measure wind as well and it was Jan Noppen who invented the Dutch windspeed standard based on the amount of sail in use on windmill sails. For example, when it was too dangerous to run the mill, it was considered "molenwind 13", which today is "windkracht 8" or gale force on the Beaufort scale.

The location was later in use by the town hall and chamber of commerce of Halfweg, and eventually in 1919 the newly formed N.V. Centrale Suiker Maatschappij, or CSM Suiker fabriek, set up headquarters there.

== Gallery ==
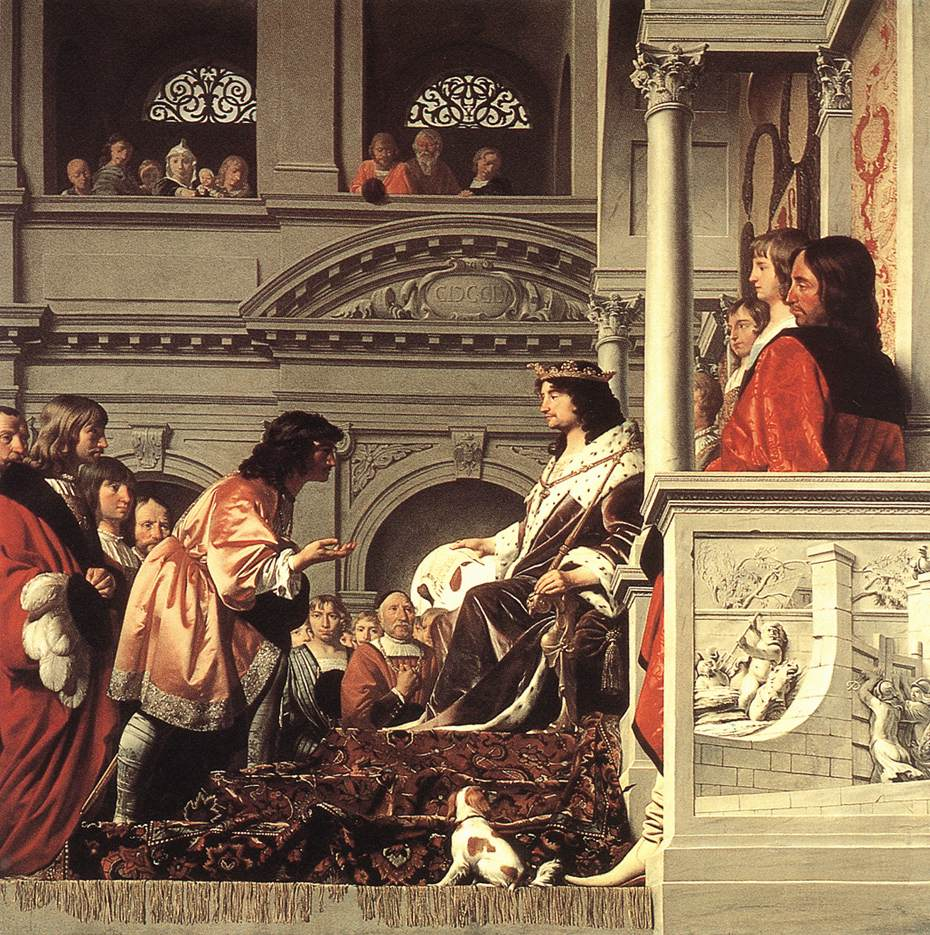
Count William II of Holland Granting Privileges in 1255 to the local Dike-wardens of Spaarndam by Caesar van Everdingen, 1654, originally commissioned for the Gemeenlandshuis Zwanenburg and today in the collection of the Gemeenlandshuis van Rijnland in Leiden.

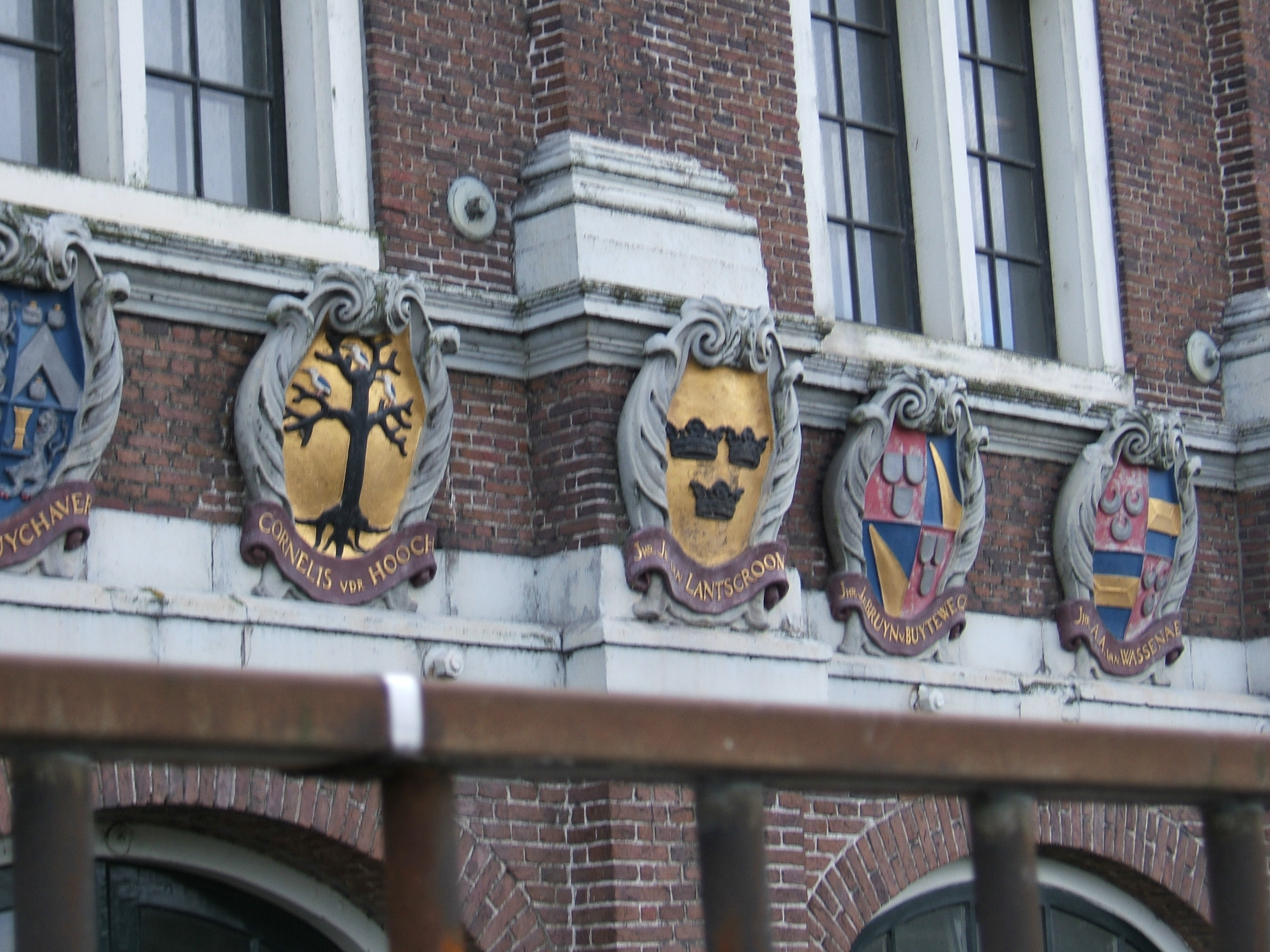
Heraldic shields of the Water Board members of Gemeenlandshuis Zwanenburg in 1646, the year that the Water Board built this house for board meetings.

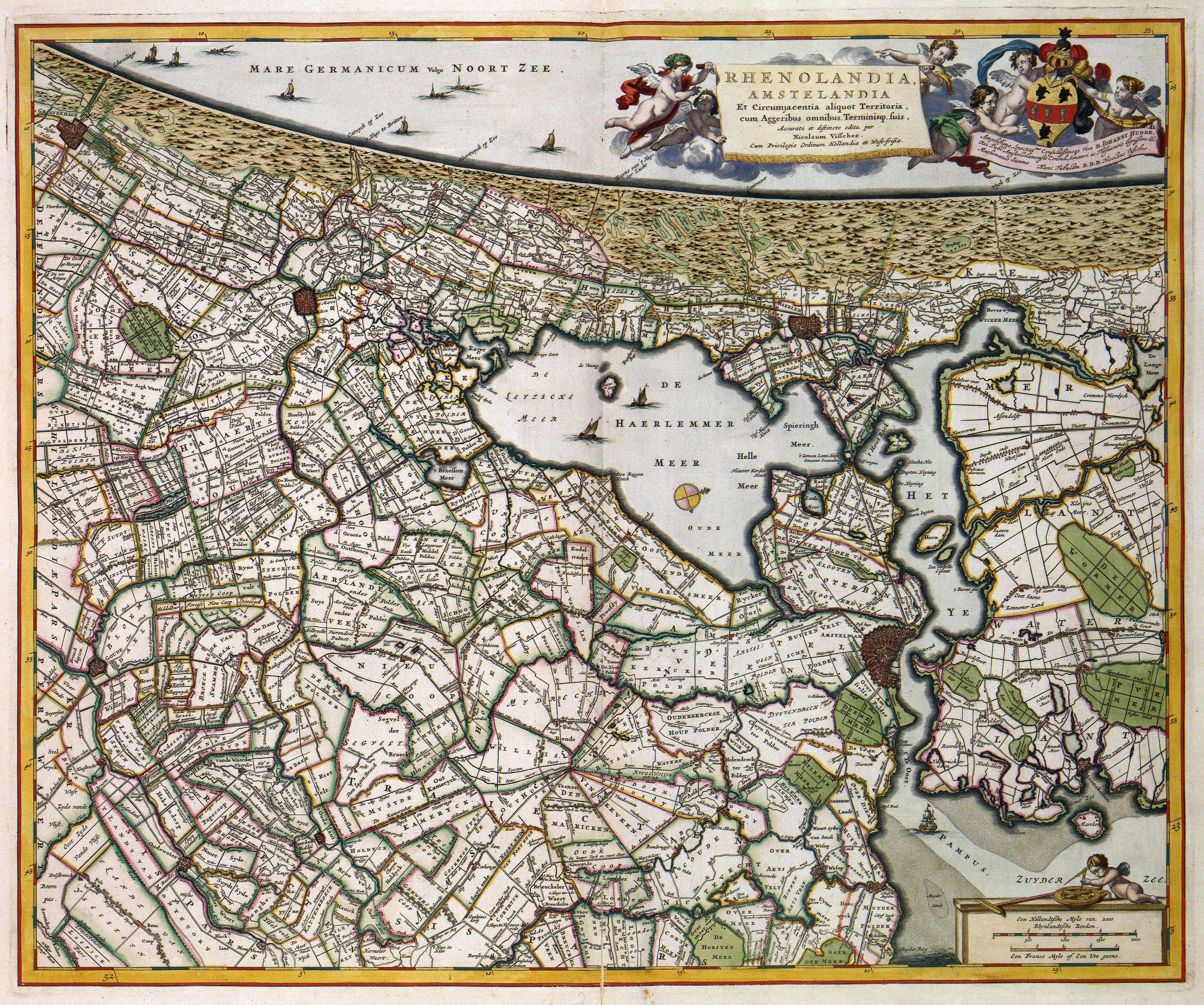
Map from 1681 showing "'t Gemeen Lants Huys Genaemt Swanenburg" at "Halfwegen".
