= Heemraad =

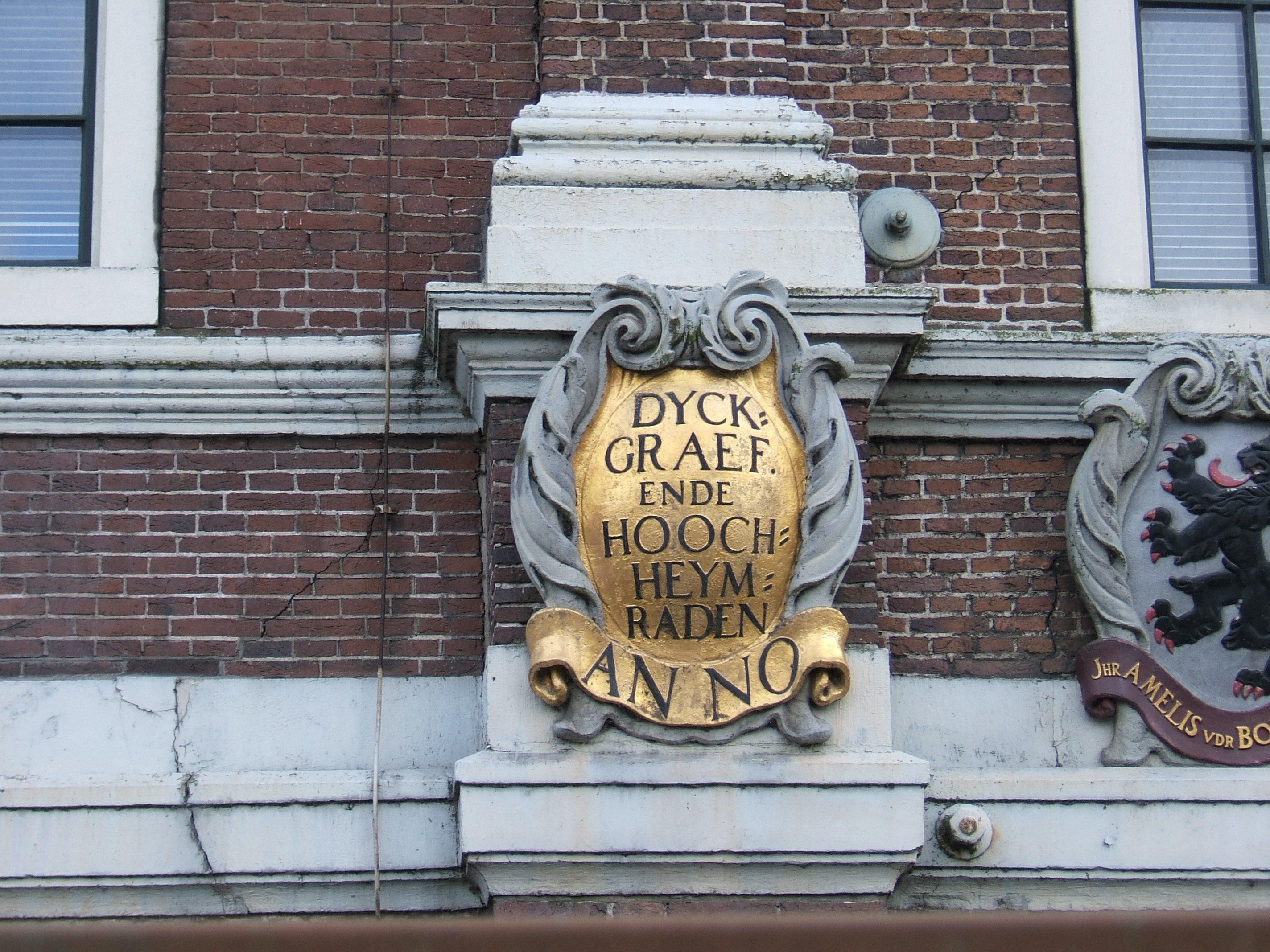
The first of a series of gablestones on a Gemeenlandshuis in Halfweg built in 1645; each stone represents the heraldic shield of the dike-reeve and his men, known as the heemraden, or in this case, the hoogheemraden

A heemraad (Dutch: [ˈɦeːmraːt]; lit. 'home-advisor'), or hoogheemraad (Dutch: [ˌɦoːxˈɦeːmraːt]; lit. 'high home-advisor') is a local official of a Dutch water board. The term can be pluralized to (hoog)heemraden, but sometimes the word heemraad also means more than one man in the sense of a meeting of (hoog)heemraden, such as decisions made by the heemraad. In this sense, the college of heemraden (college van dijkgraaf en heemraden, consisting of the dike-reeve (dijkgraaf) and the (hoog)heemraden) met and acted as one body in the same way that the executive board meet at the city hall (college van burgemeester en wethouders). A heemraad is the equivalent of an alderman (wethouder) in local government, being a member of both the local legislative council, while having representational roles for his own area. The term goes back to pre-medieval days.
