= Trekschuit =

Dutch sail- and horse-drawn boat

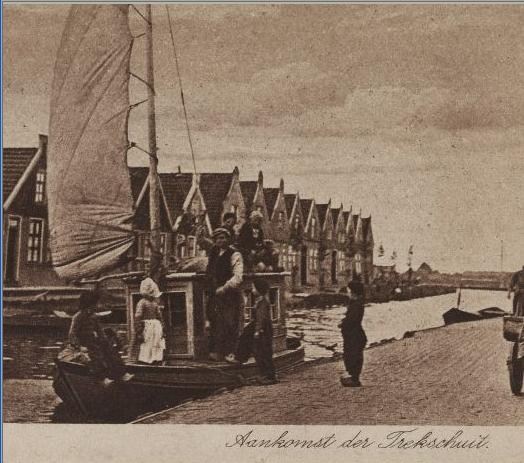
Postcard from 1922 showing trekschuit arrival in Volendam.

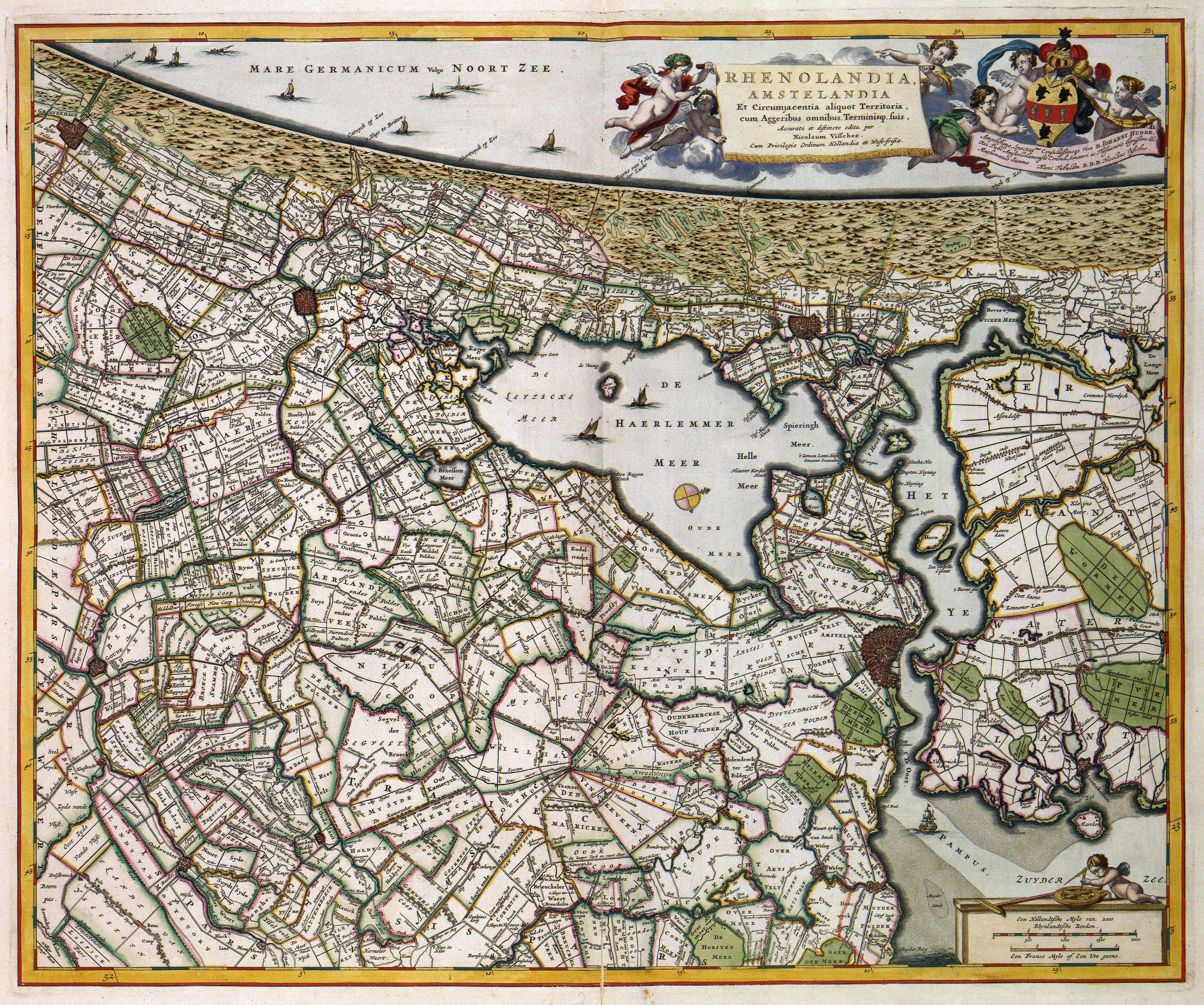
Map from 1681 showing the Haarlemmertrekvaart as connecting Haarlem to Amsterdam, and the Leidsevaart connecting Haarlem to Leiden. At Halfweg the two bodies of water "Haarlemmermeer" and "Het Ye" meet at Gemeenlandshuis Zwanenburg.

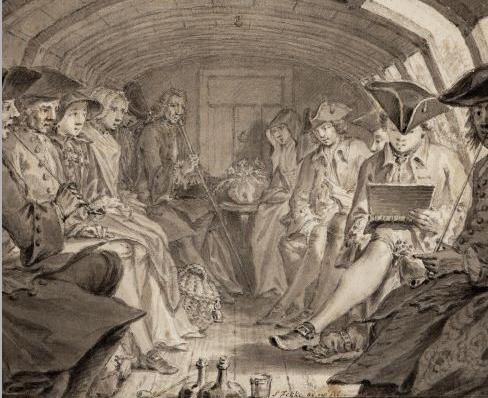
Drawing of interior of a trekschuit on the Haarlemmertrekvaart in 1760.

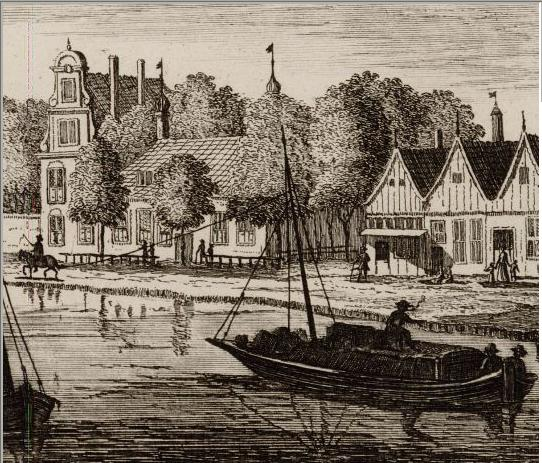
Drawing of trekschuit on Nieuweramstel 1700–1725. The jager is on the horse.

Trekschuit (Dutch pronunciation: [ˈtrɛksxœyt]; lit. 'tug-boat', i.e. 'tugged boat') is an old style of sail- and horse-drawn boat specific to the Netherlands, where it was used for centuries as a means of passenger traffic between cities along trekvaarten, or tow-canals.

== History ==
The first trekschuit 'sailed' in 1632 between Amsterdam and Haarlem and could carry 30 passengers. The trekvaart or canal was dug in a straight line to facilitate an easy pulling process and to guarantee the shortest route. The passengers needed to step out and change boats in Halfweg, which means "halfway". This is how the town of Halfweg was formed. Because of the enormous success of this Haarlemmertrekvaart, the service was extended from Haarlem to Leiden in 1657.

In 1668, the first evening service was announced in the Haarlems Dagblad, enabling daily commuting to the growing metropolis of Amsterdam, which was becoming by that time more and more necessary for the (depressed) Haarlem economy:

July 10th, 1668

Mits desen werdt een yegelijck bekent gemaeckt, dat van dese Weeck een aenvangh is gemaeckt met het varen van een Treckschuyt van Amsterdam op Haerlem, 's Avondts ten 8 Uren, en dat daer in vervolgens alle Dagen sal werden gecontinueert.

Translation: Hereby announcing that this week a start has been made with a Treckschuyt evening service from Amsterdam to Haarlem, at 8 o'clock in the evening, and from now on this shall be continued every day.

By 1700, an extensive network of trekschuit- and ferry services linked all of the important cities in the coastal provinces of the Netherlands. Travel by trekschuit was reliable, comfortable, and cheap. The speed was about 7 km/h, which was faster than walking, and more comfortable than by coach. Many foreigners praised the advantages of the system, leading to the introduction of canals, such as the Erie Canal, in the United States. The boats were pulled along by horse on a towpath (in Dutch called jaagpad, named after the jager (chaser) which accompanied the horse).

The old tow-canal system, that once were busy trekschuit routes became obsolete with the advent of the railway in the mid-19th century, many of which were first built alongside the canals because they were assumed to be the most profitable routes.

== Canal travel ==
Many foreign travellers to the Netherlands came by boat. Amsterdam during the Dutch Golden Age was the leading port city of Northern Europe and a major hub in the trekschuit network. Since the canals also functioned as the city's sewers, the smell of them in the summertime was bad. William Thomas Beckford, whose Dreams, Waking Thoughts, and Incidents is a published account of his letters back home in 1780 while on his Grand Tour of Europe, travelled from Ostend, to Antwerp, to Haarlem, and to Utrecht by trekschuit, and wrote:

UTRECHT, July 2nd, 1780. Well, thank Heaven, Amsterdam is behind us! How I got thither signifies not one farthing; it was all along a canal, as usual. The weather was hot enough to broil an inhabitant of Bengal; and the odours, exhaling from every quarter, sufficiently powerful to regale the nose of a Hottentot.

He switched his transportation to a coach from Utrecht to Spa.

== Legend of Boerhaave and Spinoza ==
In Samuel Johnson's Life of Herman Boerhaave, the legend of Boerhaave and Spinoza is related that supposedly took place in 1688 or 1689, when Boerhaave graduated from Leiden University. This makes mention of the trekschuit as a 'common boat':

"As Boerhaave was sitting in a common boat, there arose a conversation among the passengers, upon the impious and pernicious doctrine of Spinosa, which, as they all agreed, tends to the utter overthrow of all religion. Boerhaave sat, and attended silently to this discourse for some time, till one of the companies, willing to distinguish himself by his zeal, instead of refuting the positions of Spinosa by argument, began to give a loose to contumelious language, and virulent invectives, which Boerhaave was so little pleased with, that, at last, he could not forbear asking him, whether he had ever read the author he declaimed against.

The orator, not being able to answer, was checked in the midst of his invectives, but not without feeling a secret resentment against the person who had, at once, interrupted his harangue, and exposed his ignorance.

This was observed by a stranger who was in the boat with them; he inquired of his neighbor the name of the young man, whose question had put an end to the discourse, and having learned it, set it down in his pocket-book, as it appears, with a malicious design, for in a few days it was the common conversation at Leyden, that Boerhaave had revolted to Spinosa."

== Passenger boat traffic in the Netherlands today ==
The rise of the steam locomotive in the 19th century caused the decline of the trekschuit between the major cities as a form of transport, and today many of the oldest canals in congested parts of the country are defunct and no longer kept navigable by the Water board.

During World War II, a brief revival of the trekschuit occurred because of the scarcity of fuel for motorized transport. Since then, in Amsterdam the trekschuit has given way to the "museum boat" and "canal cruises" used exclusively by tourists. In the provinces, where the infrastructure has not been superseded by trains or highways, the old trekschuit canals are popular for water tourism and many cities and towns are installing boat landings built specifically for pleasure boating. Restored trekschuits are chic venues for weddings or other parties in the summer, while larger antique barges are transformed into traveling hotels offering cruise vacations.

== See also ==
- Beurtvaart – licensed line shipping in the Netherlands in the same era
- Dutch barge
- Narrowboat – similar type of boat used in the British Isles
