= Gemeenlandshuis =

Building of the headquarters of the Netherlands' water authority

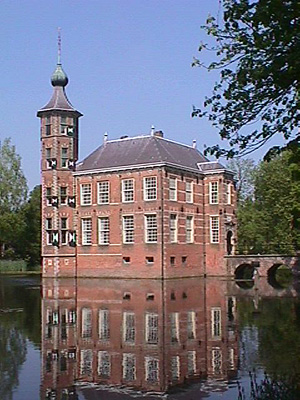
Castle Bouvigne in Breda, a former Gemeenlandshuis

A Gemeenlandshuis, or Waterschapshuis is a building that is (or was formerly used as) the headquarters of one of the Waterboards of the Netherlands.

== History ==
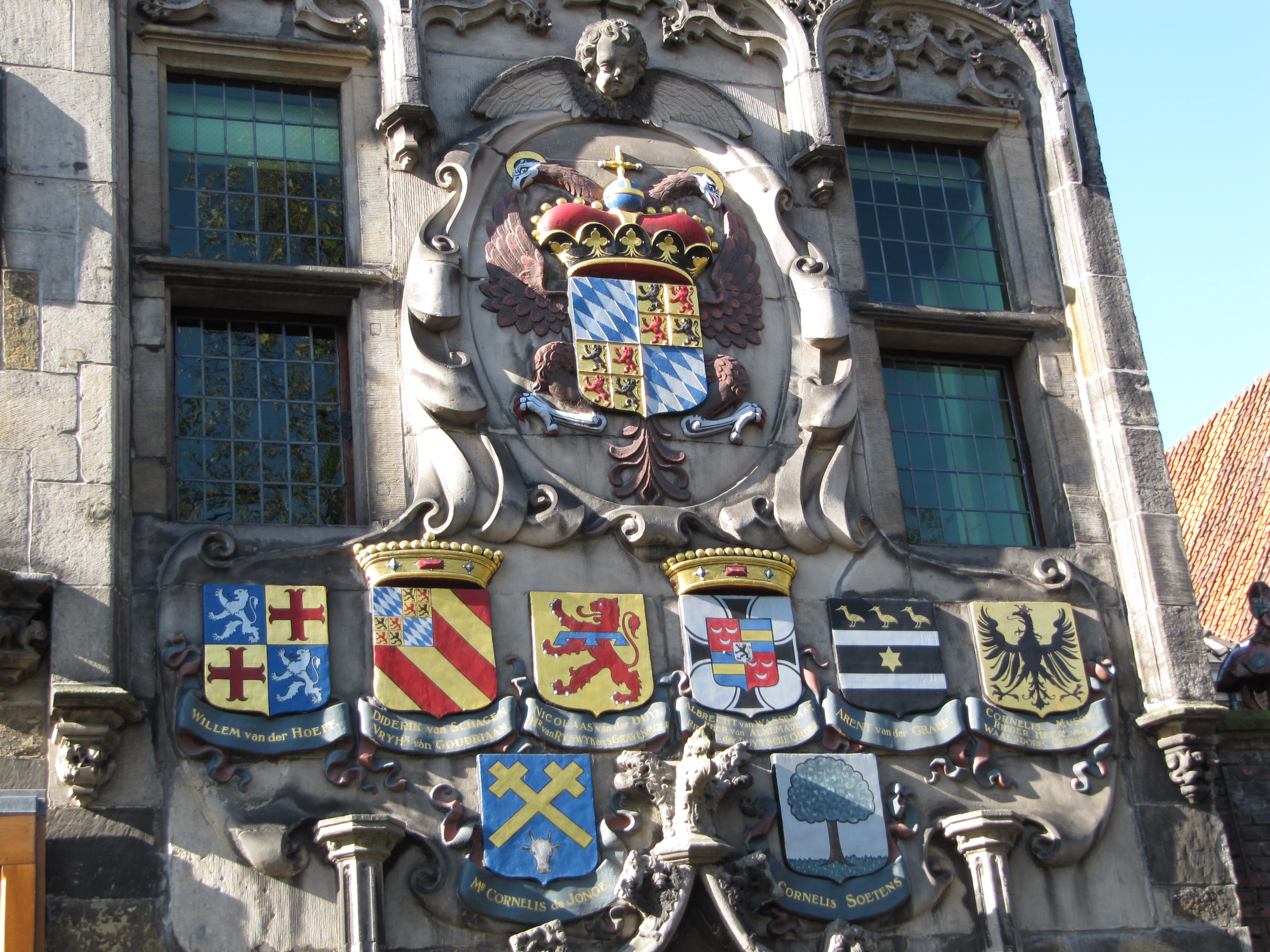
Heraldic shields of the Delft Water Board members in 1645, the year that the Water Board bought this house for board meetings, on the facade of the Gemeenlandshuis in Delft.

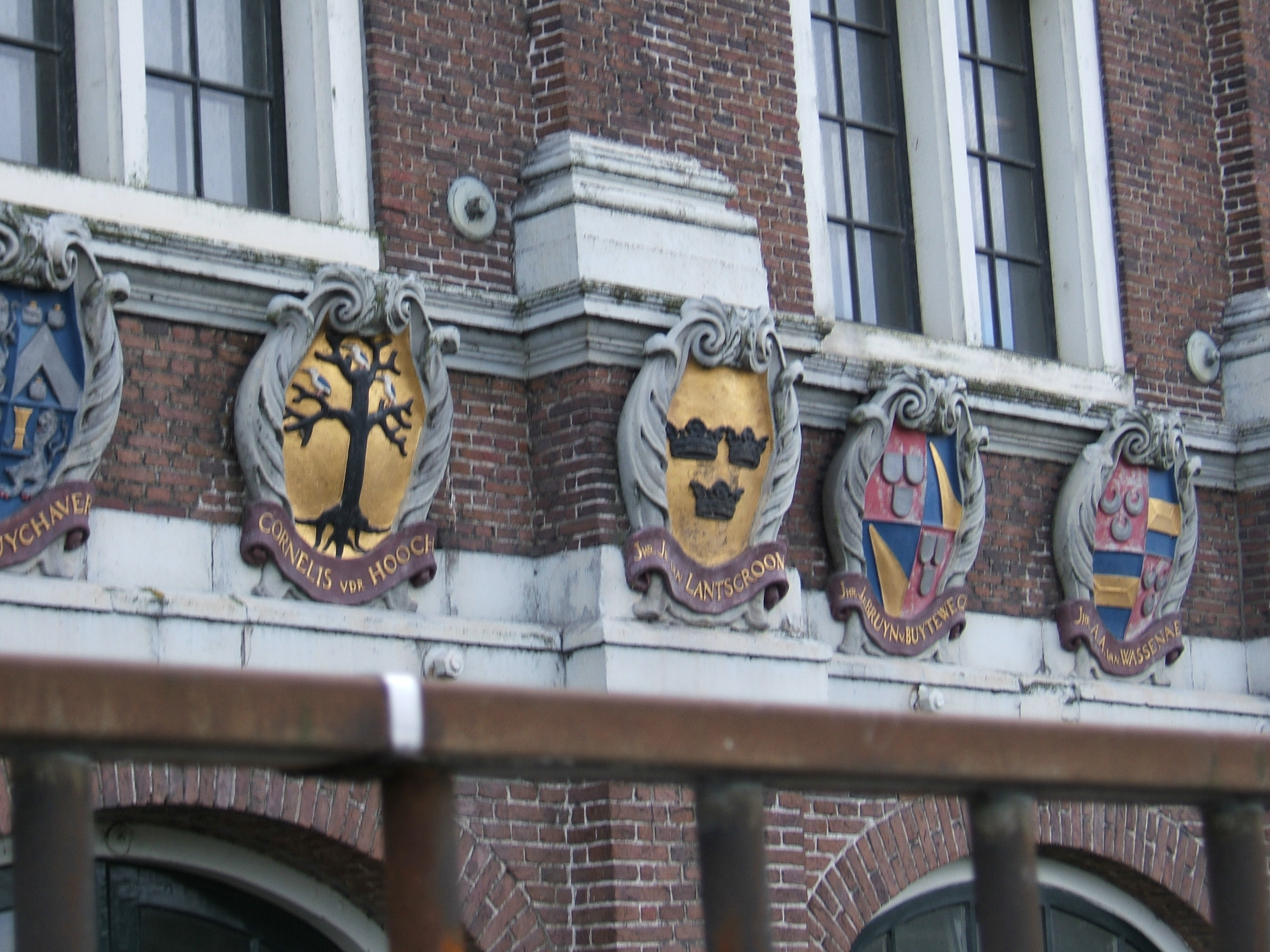
Heraldic shields of the Halfweg Water Board members in 1646, the year that the Water Board built this house for board meetings, on the facade of the Gemeenlandshuis Zwanenburg in Halfweg.

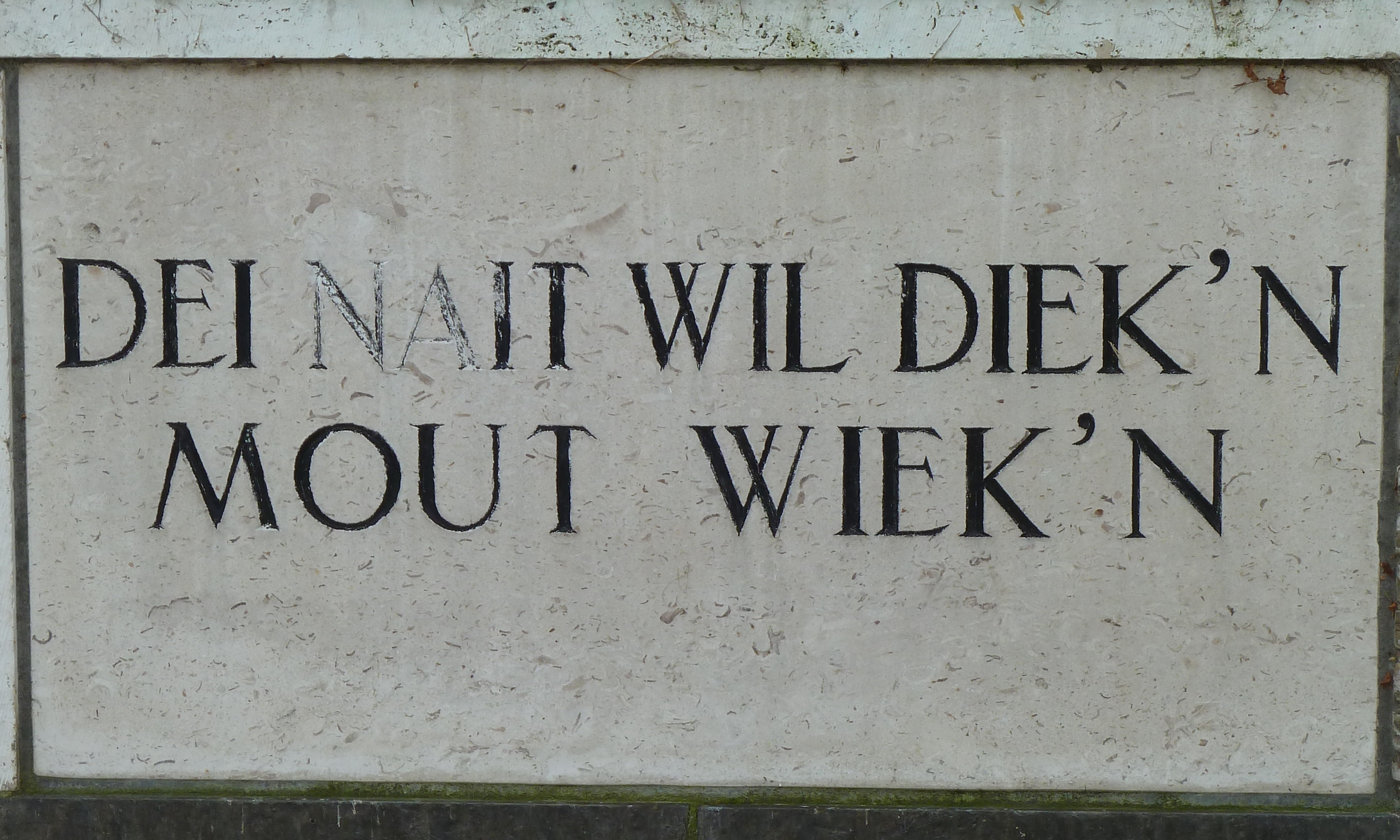
Keystone on the Waterschapshuis in Onderdendam; "Dei nait wil diek'n mout wiek'n", which loosely translated means "Whoever doesn't want to build a dike has to yield."

Early flood control in the Netherlands is often called the Teerschouw, which loosely translated means "consumption during observation". This technique was a periodic check of the local dike system by the Dike-reeve and his men. If they found a problem, they would simply go to the nearest house or inn, and stay there for free until the problem was fixed. This was a fairly direct and simple form of water management. These measures were rarely necessary, since the local people took water management very seriously. The Dike-reeve and his men (themselves local representatives of smaller water board agencies) mostly met to discuss major issues and water improvements, and though they met at each other's homes until the 16th century, as the country grew and the water management issues became more complex, halls were purchased to meet each other regularly.

The Water Boards became governing bodies much like a town hall became a meeting place for the city council. In most Dutch cities, especially those on a river or located at a seaside port, the Gemeenlandshuis was the same size as the Town Hall. Examples can be seen today in Leiden, home to the Gemeenlandshuis van Rijnland, and Delft, home to the Hoogheemraadschap van Delfland.

The Gemeenlandshuis in Delft houses the main office of the Delfland Water Board. The Late-Gothic building, situated on the Oude Delft 167, was built in 1505. The first owner was Jan de Huyter, bailiff of Delft and steward of Delfland. Later occupants were Philips, Count of Hohenlohe who was married to Maria of Nassau, a daughter of Willem of Orange. The Delfland Water Board has been established here since 1645. The building contains a large collection of old maps of Delfland. A large number of Coats of Arms (or heraldic shields) cover the sandstone façade . Fortunately the façade was spared during the fire of 1536 which burned through the city of Delft. The main entrance to the Delfland Water Board is now situated on the Phoenixstraat where more recently buildings been added on.

== Borders of jurisdiction ==
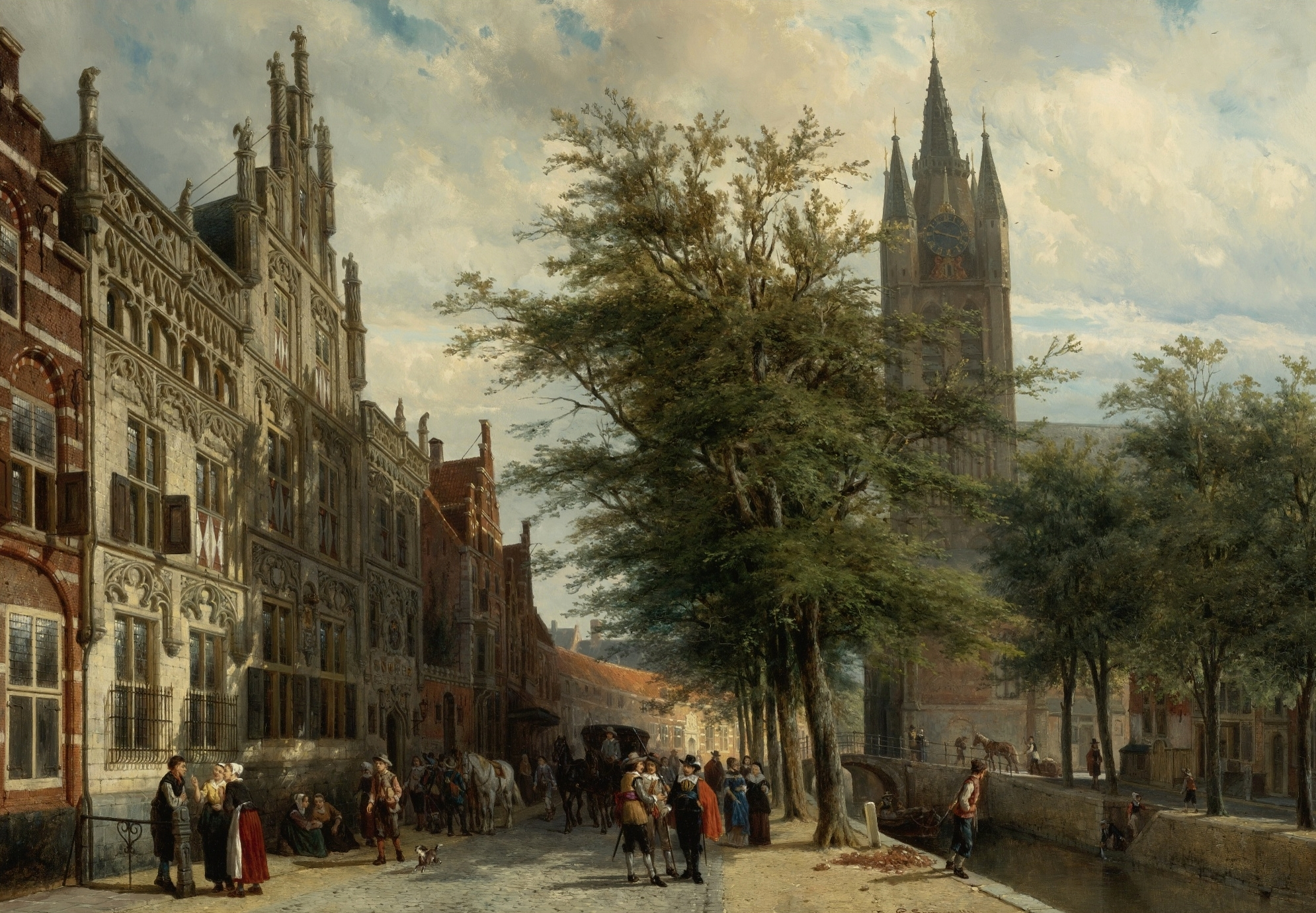
Cornelis Springer's The Gemeenlandshuis and the Old Church, Delft, Summer (1877)

The Water Boards governed territories that spanned several municipalities. Because of the complications this extra dimension gave to local governance, city planning was done as much as possible in accordance with water management plans. To save time, the meetings were done as much as possible near to the areas in question. This meant that the Dike-Reeve and his men needed to travel a lot. Since the Water Boards received their own income from taxes, they had enough money to spend on meeting halls, and they built meeting halls for convenience in out-of-the-way places. For this reason many meeting halls were unusually large that were located in very small towns, such as the Gemeenlandshuis Zwanenburg in Halfweg, or the Waterschapshuis in Onderdendam. These were locations that were strategically suited for meetings when the waterworks were being inspected.

== Notes ==
- Waterschappen in Nederland: werken met water, een onberekenbare vriend, Koos Groen, Toon Schmeink, Bosch & Keuning, 1981, ISBN 90-246-4386-4
