= Ans Markus =

Dutch painter and sculptor (born 1947)

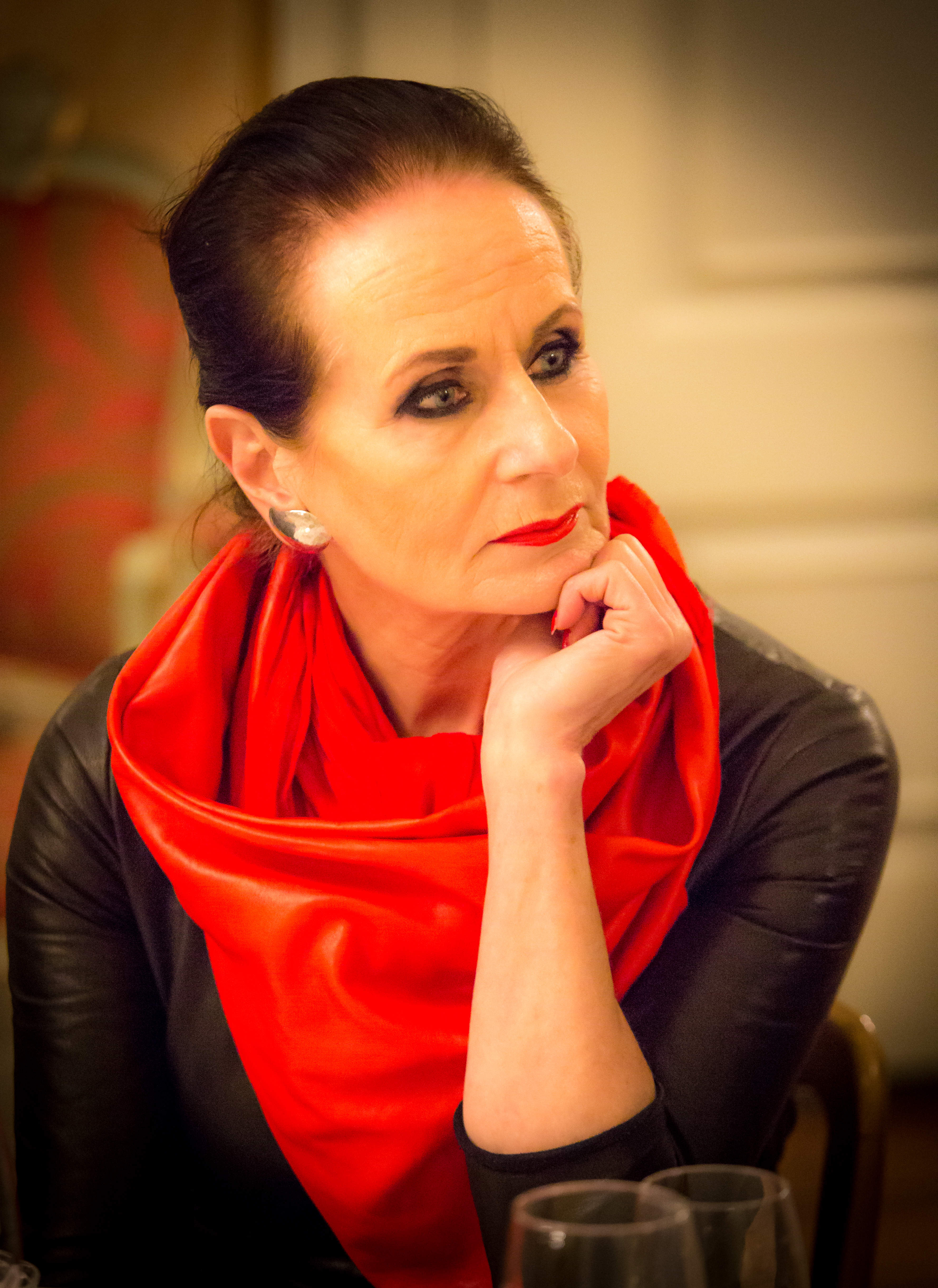
Ans Markus in 2015

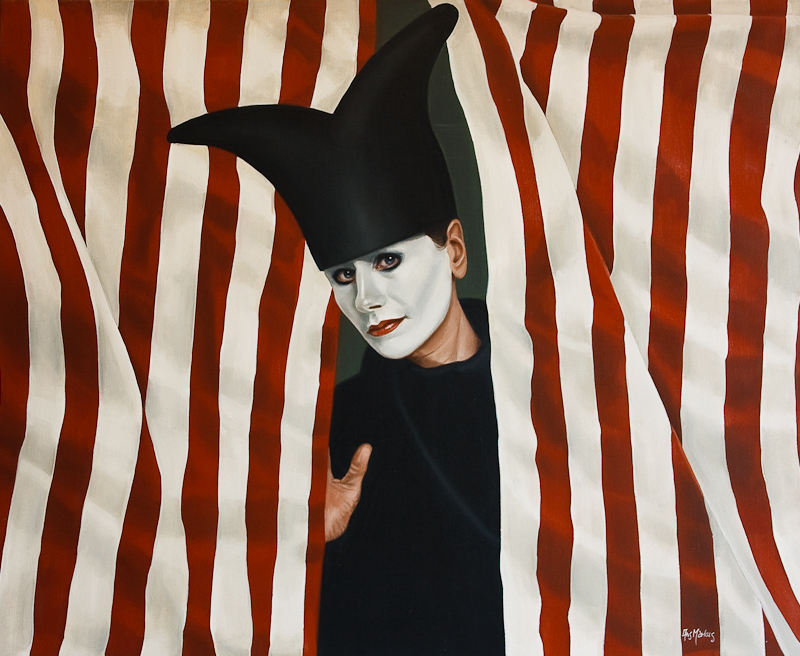
Self portrait of Ans Markus as pierrot (from the art collection of the ING Group).

Antje Geertje (Ans) Markus (born January 29, 1947) is a Dutch painter and sculptor.

== Biography ==
Markus was born in Halfweg, in the province of North Holland. She is known for her paintings of a woman in white drapings. Markus is a self-taught artist who deploys a realistic painting style.

Markus’ first exposition was opened in 1981. In 1995, she opened her own exposition space. In 2003, her 25th anniversary as a painter was celebrated with the release of a book which featured a vast collection of her paintings.

Recently, more of her work has been displayed in museums and expositions across The Netherlands. In 2007, 2008, and 2010, her work was displayed in the Noord Brabants Museum, Kunstkerk Bakenes Haarlem Exposition, and Jan Van Der Togt Museum respectively.

== Style and Technique ==
While Markus can be generally defined as a fashion painter, she is more specifically known for her work depicting women in white linen draping. These paintings are crafted using a realistic style, and many of these paintings feature the same woman. Interestingly, many of these works also feature a relationship to animals. In one of these pieces, the woman in drapings appears to have the horns of a ram whereas in another, she has the horns of a bull. Throughout Markus’ collection, this woman can also be seen with scorpions, fish, bugs, and snakes. In all of these paintings featuring the woman in drapes, her head is tightly wound by the draping and her eyes are concealed.

Markus has also worked on sculptures which feature a woman whose eyes are concealed by cloth.

== Awards ==
In 2009, Markus was recognized as the Dutch painter of the year.

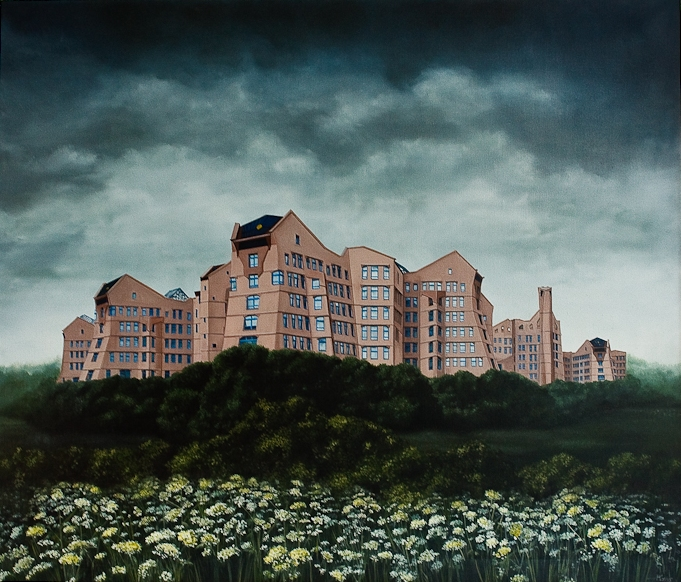
Head office of ING Group as painted by Ans Markus (1987) in a fantasy landscape
