= Dijkgraaf (official) =

Chair of a Dutch water board

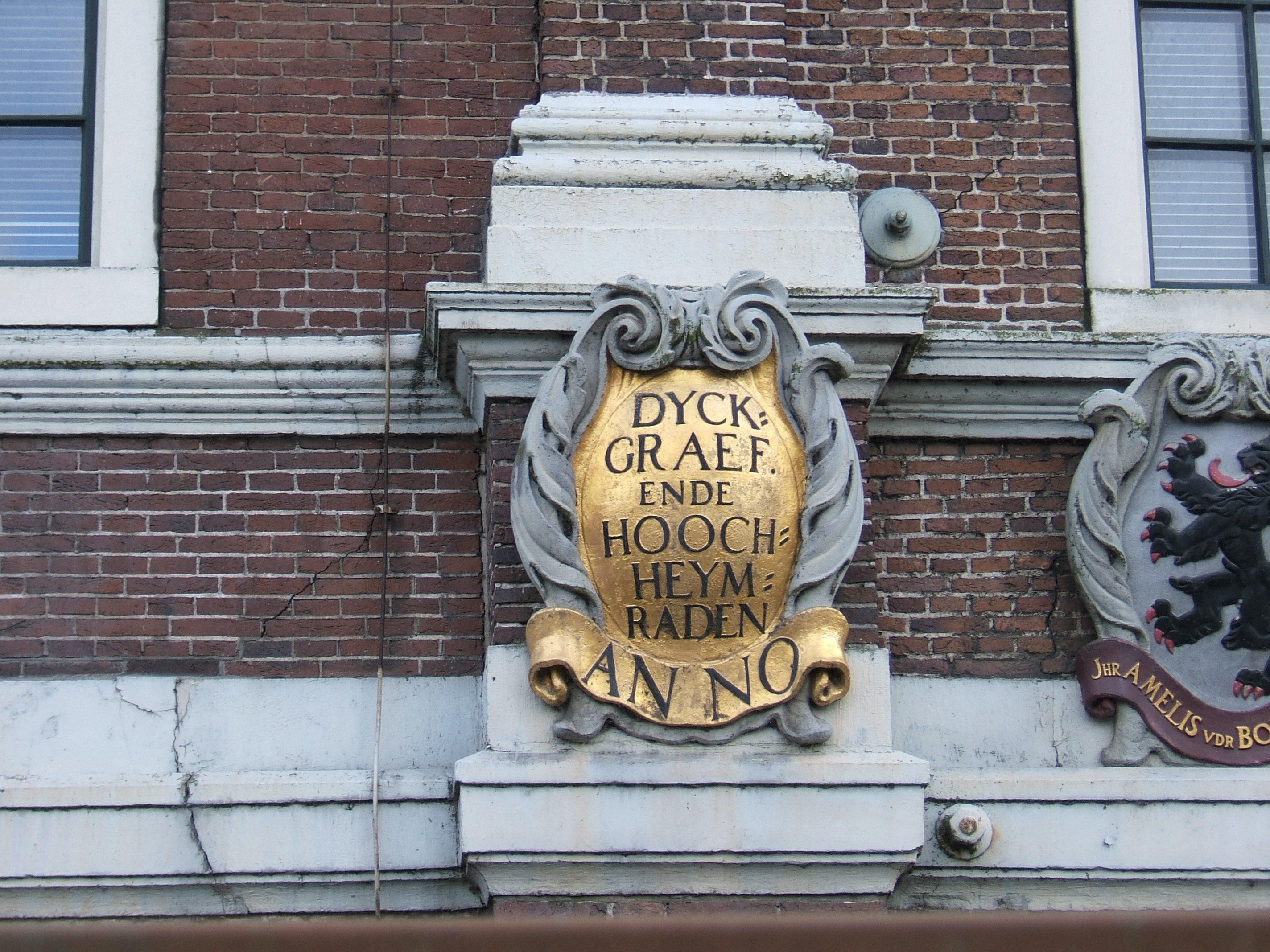
The first of a series of gablestones on a Gemeenlandshuis in Halfweg built in 1645; each stone represents the heraldic shield of the dike-reeve and his men, known as the heemraden, or in this case, the high or hoogheemraden

A dijkgraaf (lit. 'dike-warden, dike-reeve'), sometimes called a watergraaf, is the chair of a Dutch water board. The dijkgraaf is the equivalent of a mayor in local government and a King's Commissioner in provincial government, chairing both the legislative and executive council, while having both ceremonial and representational roles as well as their own portfolios. The term goes back to medieval days.

Literally the term means "Dike count", like other titles ending in -graaf (equivalent to English: -grave and German: -graf) of feudal origin, but remained a functional official. The government bodies in the Netherlands today in order of rank are:

1. National
2. Provincial
3. Water boards
4. Municipal.

In medieval times and earlier however, the water boards were the same as municipal, and since it was a country of duchies, the Water board (Waterschap) was in governmental terms the equivalent of a city (Stad), and thus also the highest form of government.
