= Spaarndam =

Village in North Holland, Netherlands

- Village
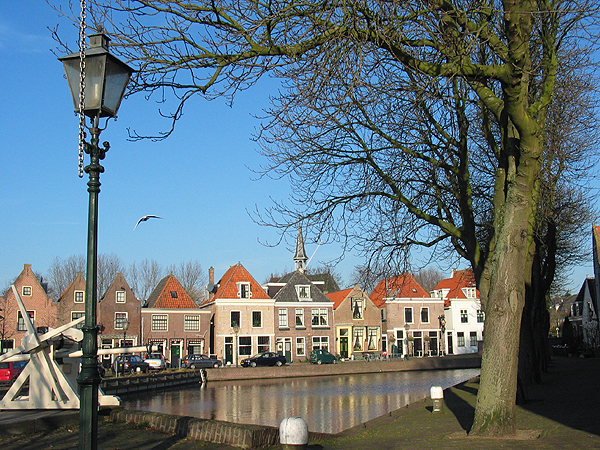
- Westkolk in Spaarndam

- Flag Coat of arms

- Location of Spaarndam in the Netherlands Spaarndam (Europe)
- Coordinates: 52°25′N 4°41′E
- Country: Netherlands
- Province: North Holland
- Region: Amsterdam metropolitan area

Area
  - Land: 1.26 km^{2} (0.49 sq mi)
  - Water: 0.4 km^{2} (0.15 sq mi)
- Demonym: Spaarndammer
- Time zone: UTC+1 (CET)
  - Summer (DST): UTC+2 (CEST)
- Postcode: 2063 (West), 2064 (East)
- Area code: 023
- Website: dorpsraadspaarndam.nl

Spaarndam (Dutch pronunciation: [ˌspaːr(ə)nˈdɑm]) is a village in the province of North Holland, the Netherlands, on the Spaarne river and the IJ lake. The oldest part of the village, on the western side of the Spaarne, belongs to the municipality of Haarlem; the newer part on the eastern side is a part of the municipality of Haarlemmermeer. The village is built around a dam in the river, which is also the division line of the two municipalities.

Spaarndam was created around a dam where the river Spaarne flows into the IJ. This dam was built here by count Floris V of Holland in 1285. The village collected tolls at this dam, and people made their living from fishing. From 1812 to 1927, the western part of Spaarndam was an independent municipality.

The village has some tourism, and many people commute to Amsterdam and Haarlem. Two historical fortresses are also present in the village, a part of the Stelling van Amsterdam.

== Culture ==
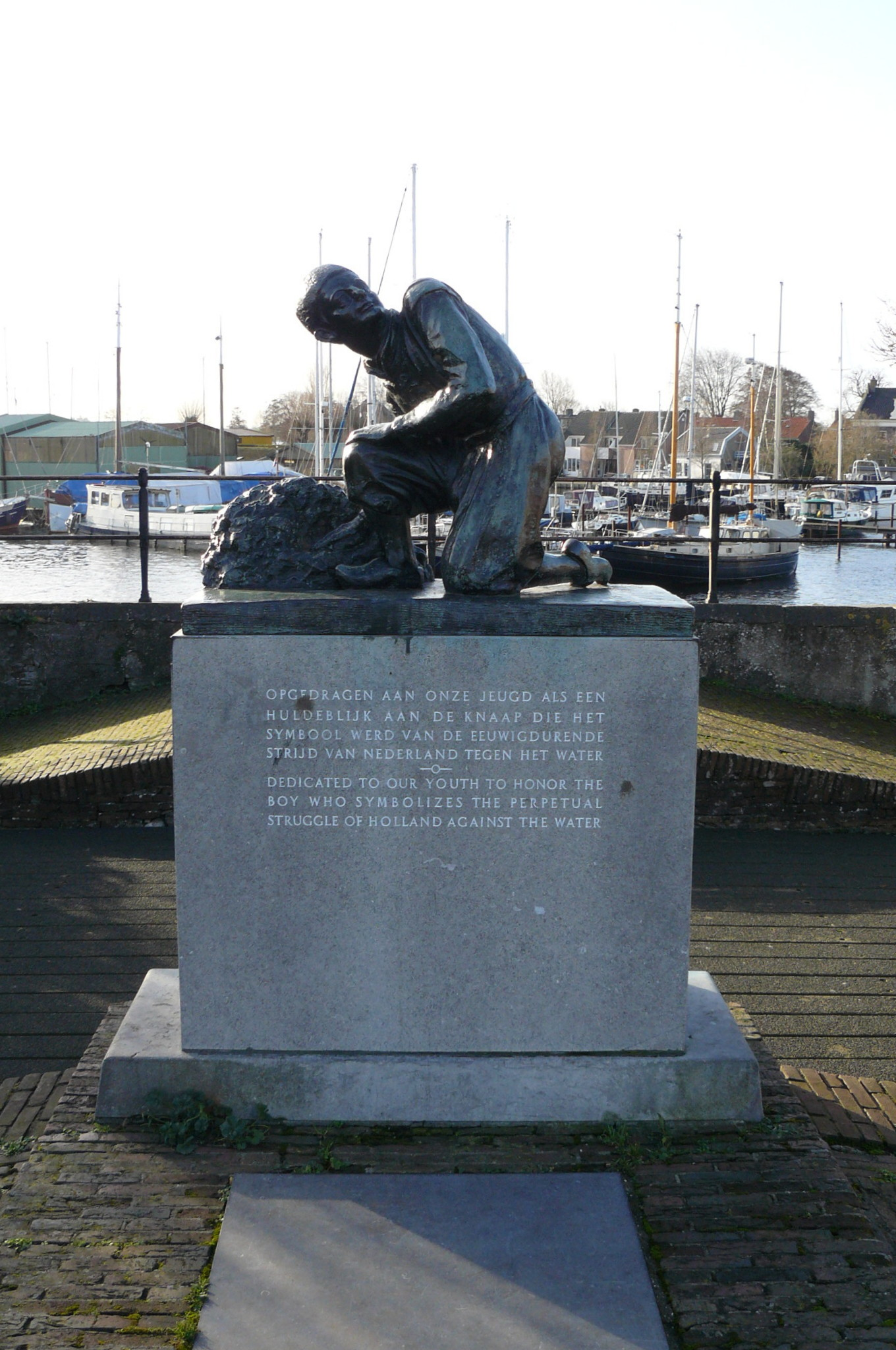
Statue of Hans Brinker, placed in 1950. Plaque reads: "Dedicated to our youth to honor the boy who symbolizes the perpetual struggle of Holland against the water"

Spaarndam has always been strongly connected to water. Besides the river and the fishing, it is also famous because of a story within the 1865 American novel, Hans Brinker or the Silver Skates, about a Dutch boy, "The Hero of Haarlem," who stuck his finger in a dike to prevent the town from flooding. The story became a popular legend in America, and in 1950 the local tourist bureau put a statue of this character in Spaarndam.

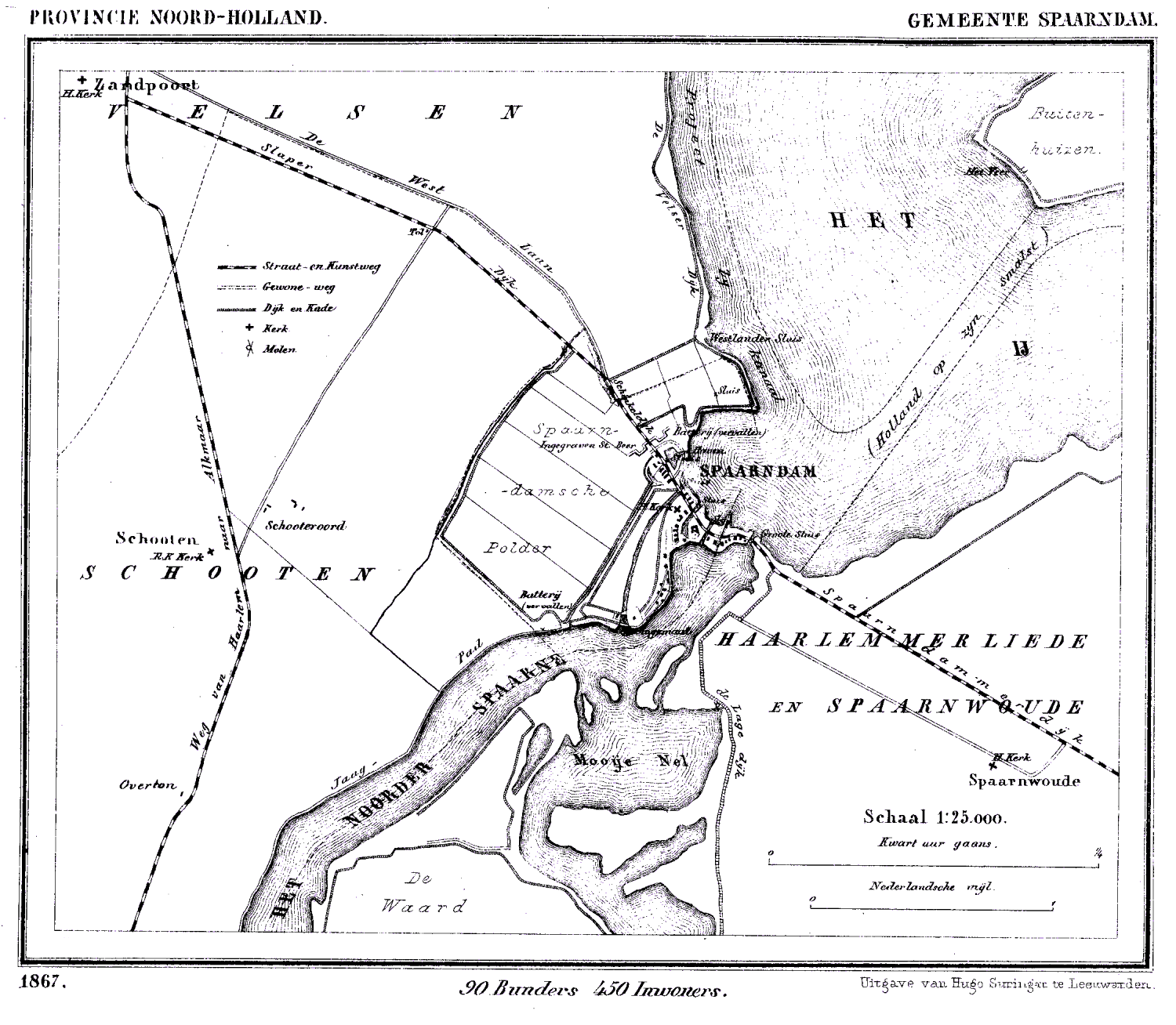
Map of the former municipality in 1867
