= Caesar van Everdingen =

Dutch painter

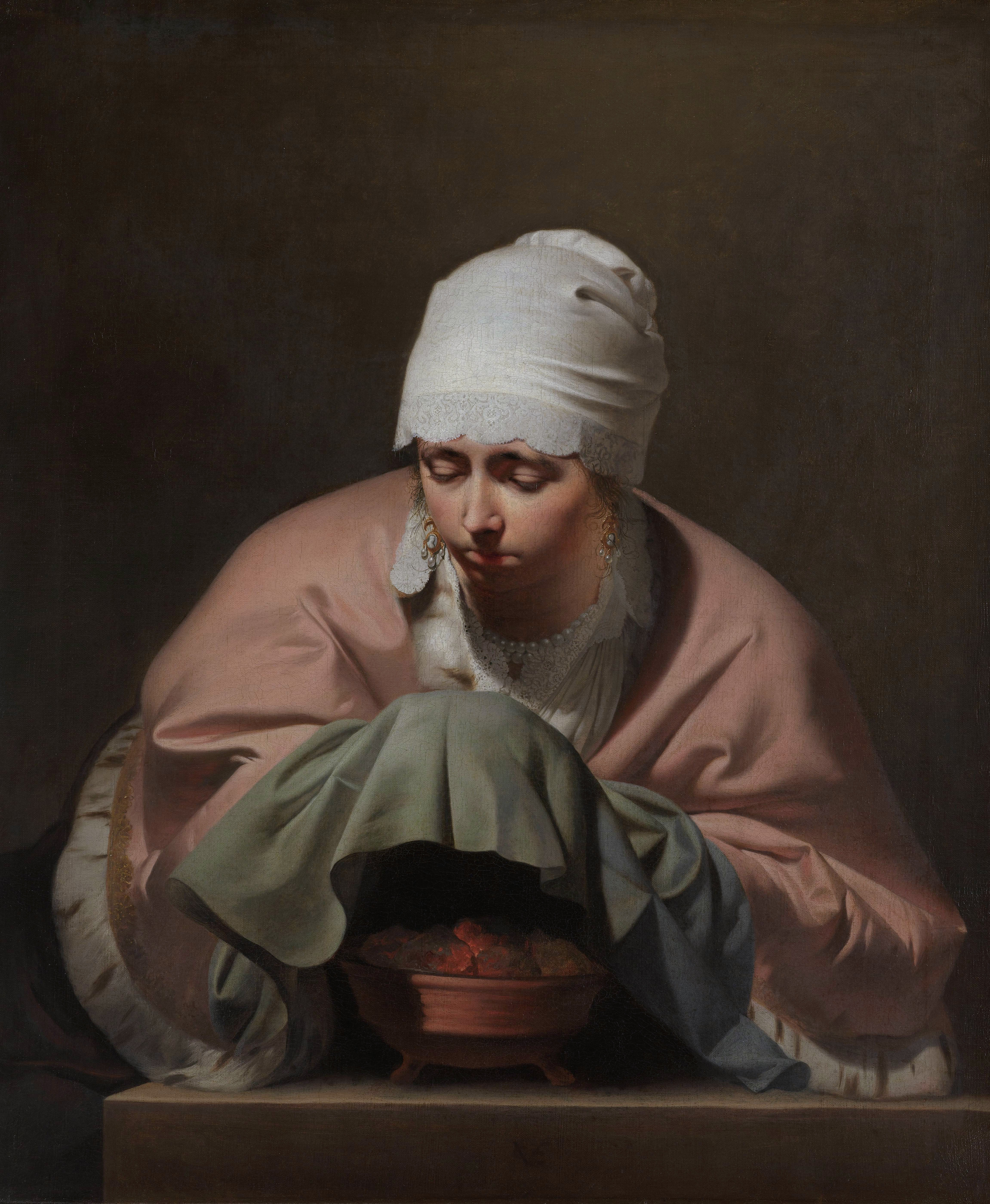
Young woman warming her hands by Caesar van Everdingen (1646), Rijksmuseum, Amsterdam

Cesar Pietersz, or Cesar Boetius van Everdingen (1616/17 – buried 13 October 1678), older brother of Allart van Everdingen and Jan van Everdingen, was a Dutch Golden Age portrait and history painter.

== Biography ==
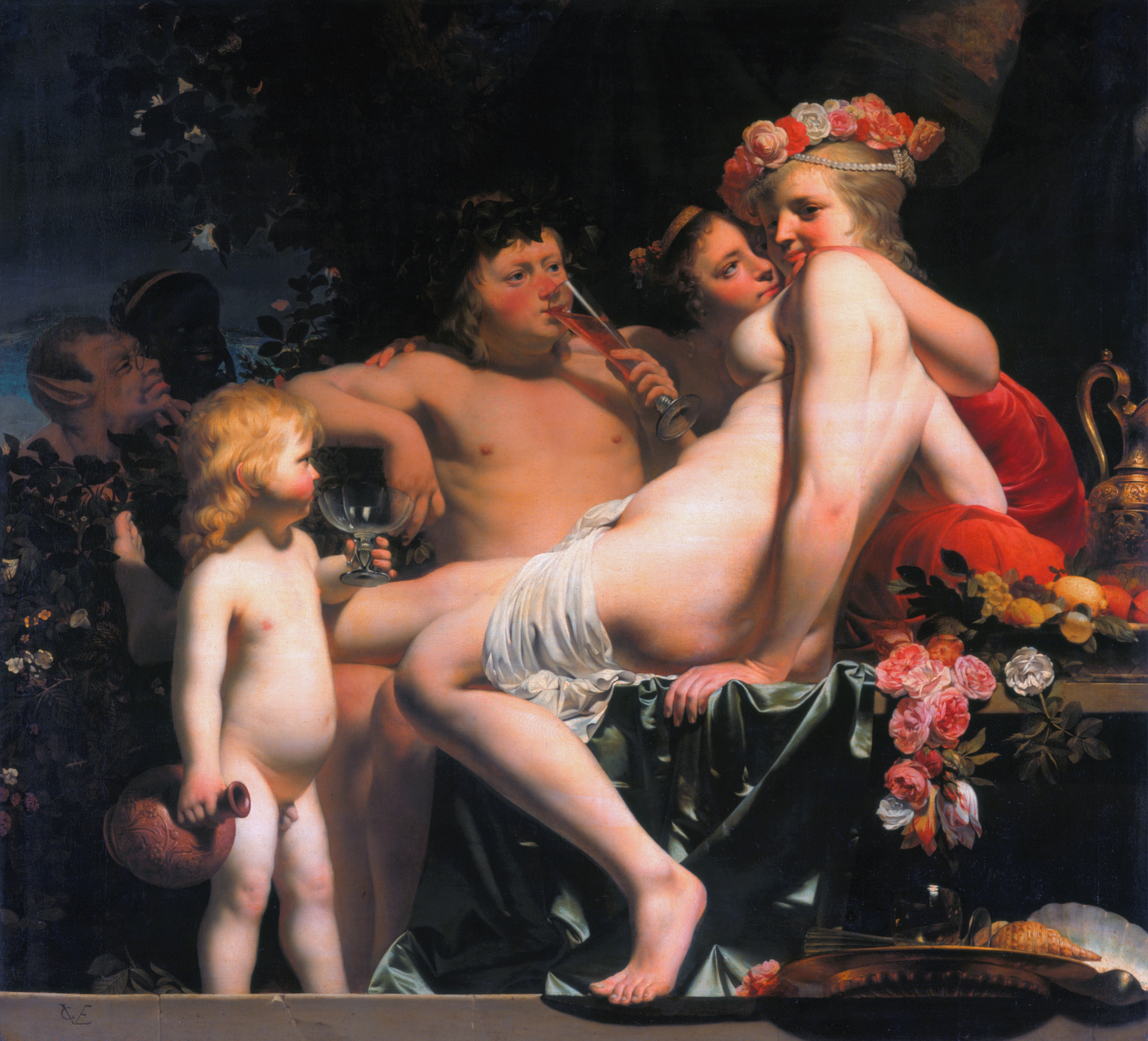
Bacchus and Ariadne, 1660

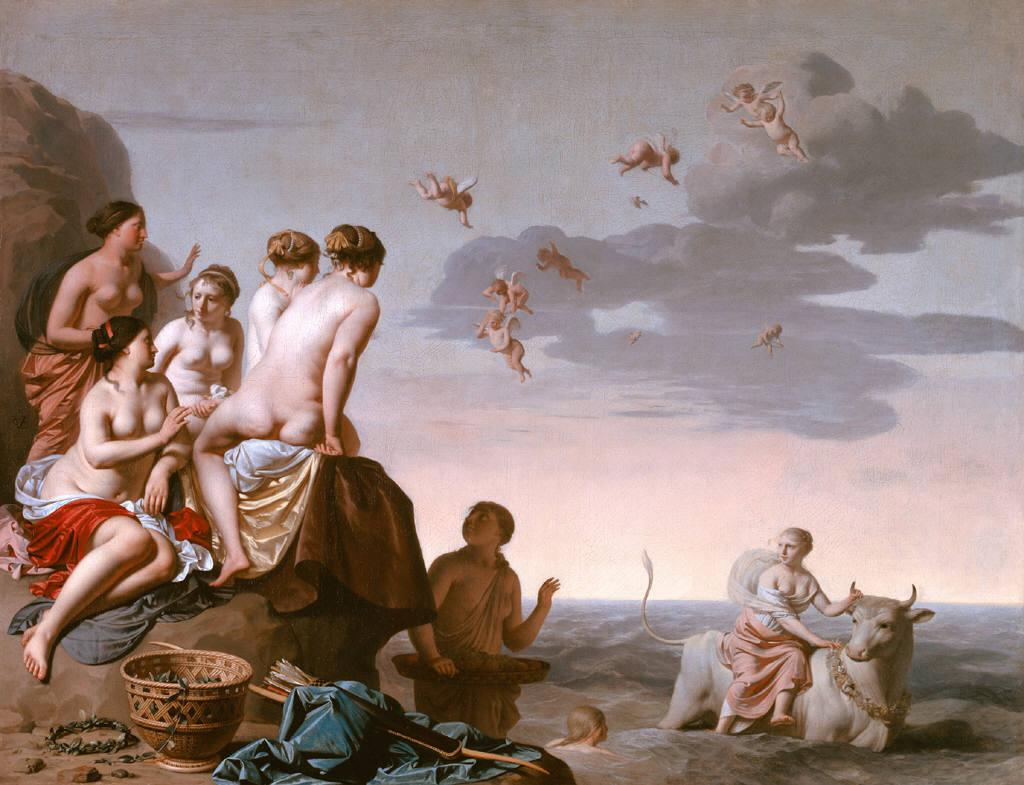
Rape of Europa

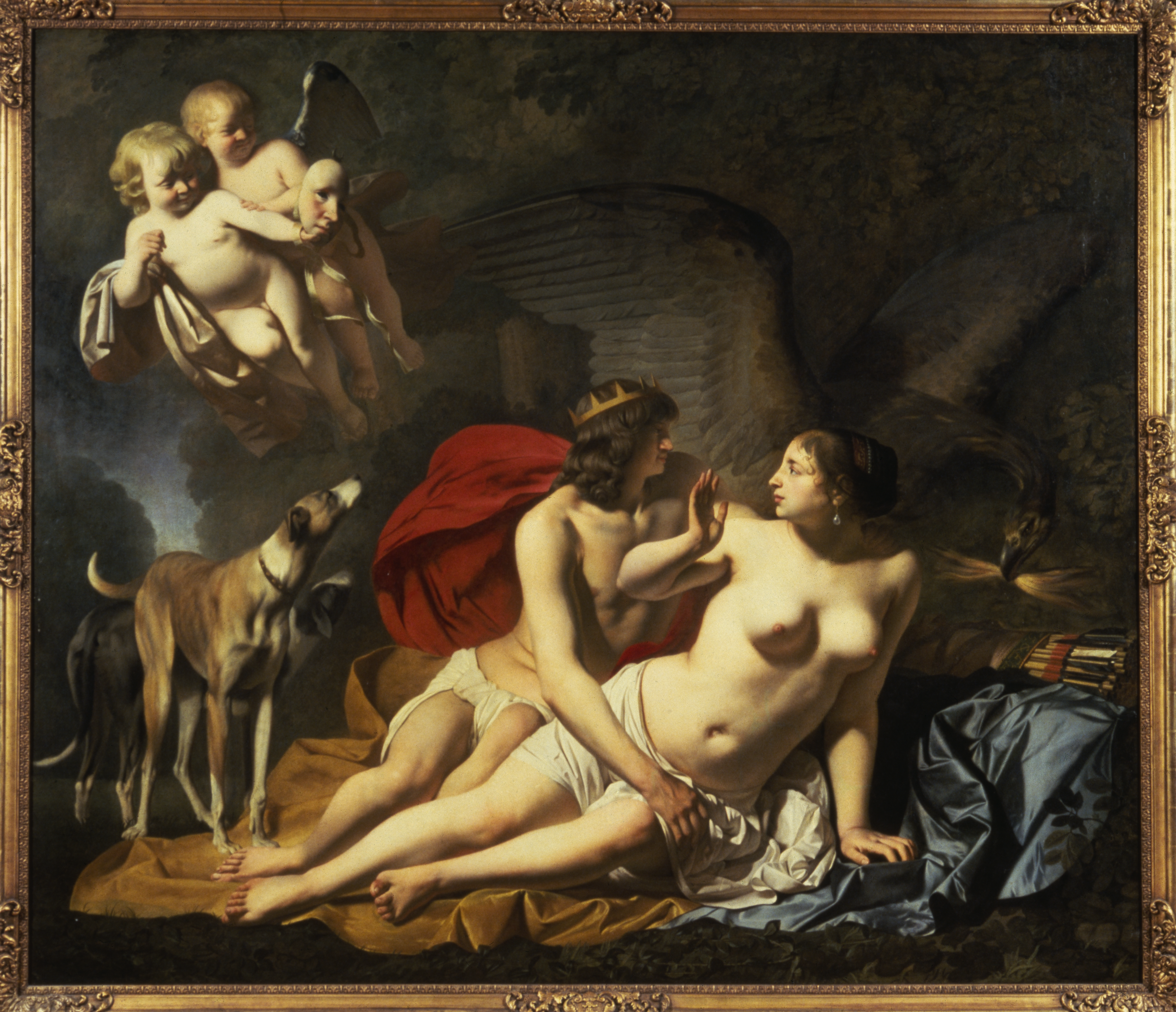
Jupiter and Callisto

He was born in Alkmaar and educated in Utrecht, where he learned to paint from Jan Gerritsz van Bronckhorst. Caesar became a member of the painter's guild in Alkmaar in 1632. His first known painting dates from 1636. In 1648 he moved to Haarlem, where he joined the Haarlem Guild of St. Luke and the civic guard (or schutterij) there, where he met Jacob van Campen. From 1648 to 1650 He helped him with the decoration of the Oranje Zaal (Orange room) in Huis ten Bosch. In 1658 he moved back to Alkmaar where he started a workshop and took on pupils. He died and was buried in the Grote- or St. Laurenskerk in Alkmaar.

== Works ==
Many of his pictures are to be seen in the museums and private houses of the Netherlands, with several on display at the Stedelijk Museum Alkmaar. His pupils were Jan Theunisz Blanckerhoff, Adriaen Dekker, Hendrik Graauw, and Thomas Heeremans. Houbraken also lists two other pupils; Adriaen Warmenhuizen, and Laurens Oosthoorn. The Thyssen-Bornemisza Museum in Madrid owns a Vertumnus and Pomona c. 1637–1640.

== Gallery ==
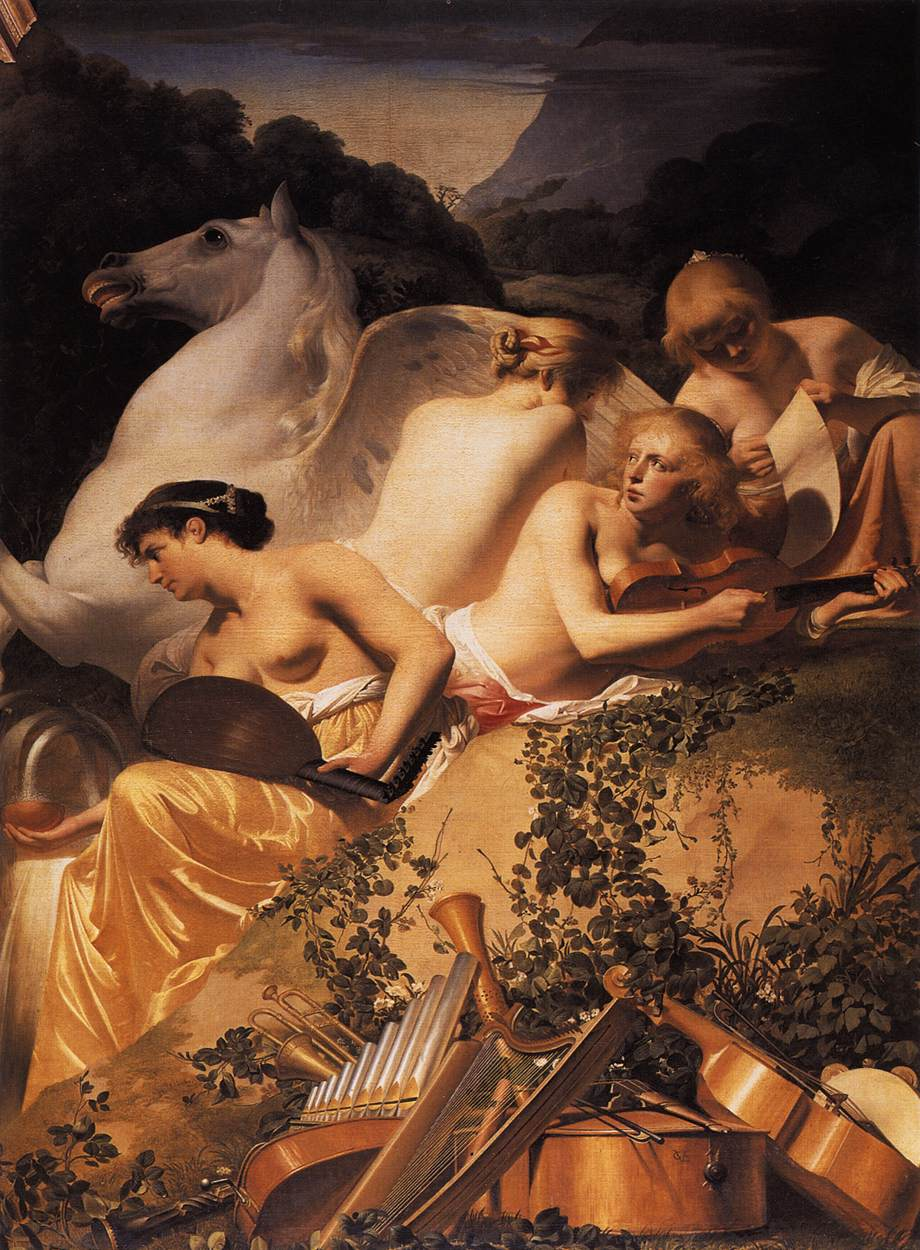
Four Muses and Pegasus on Parnassus

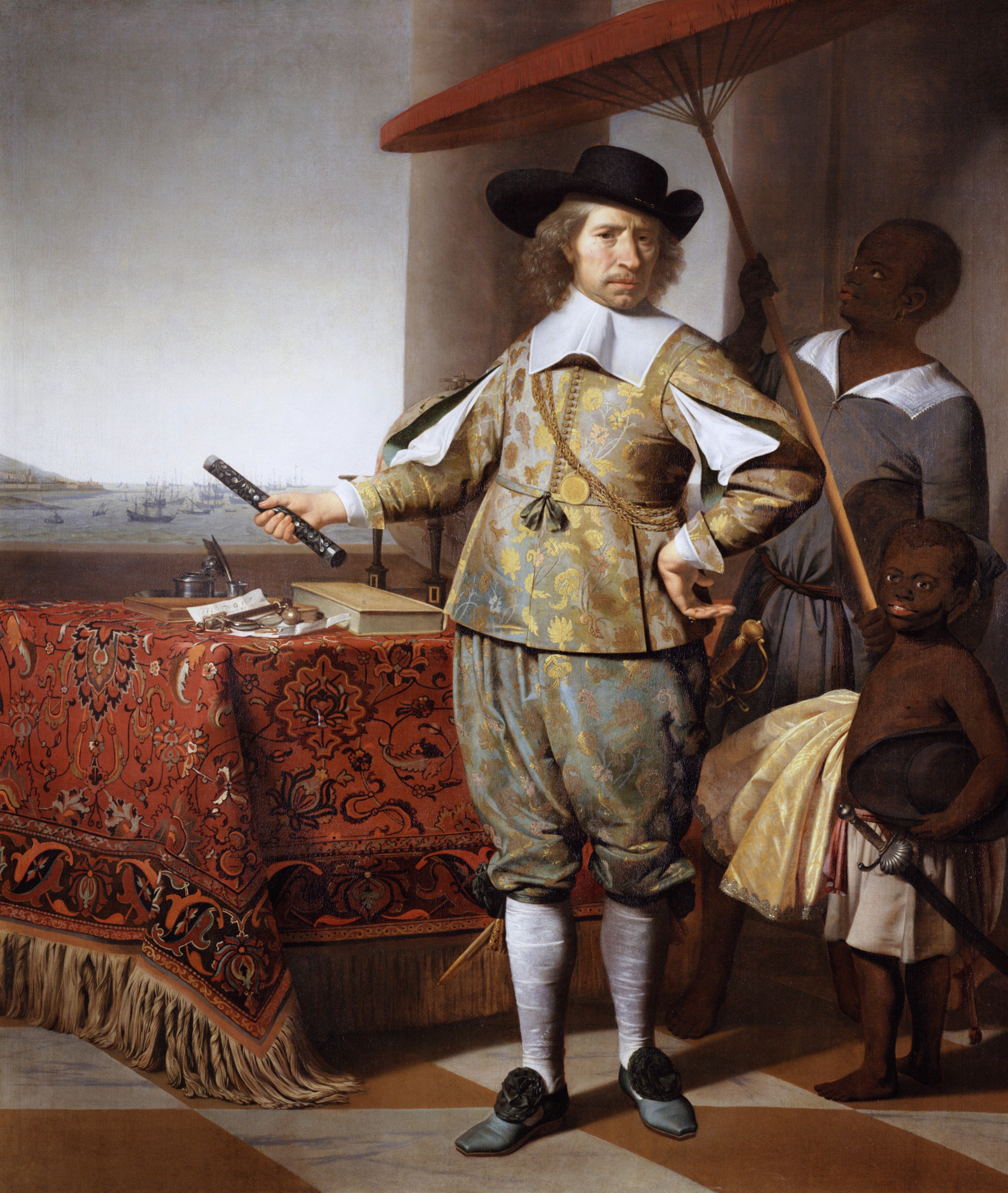
Wollebrand Geleynssen de Jongh

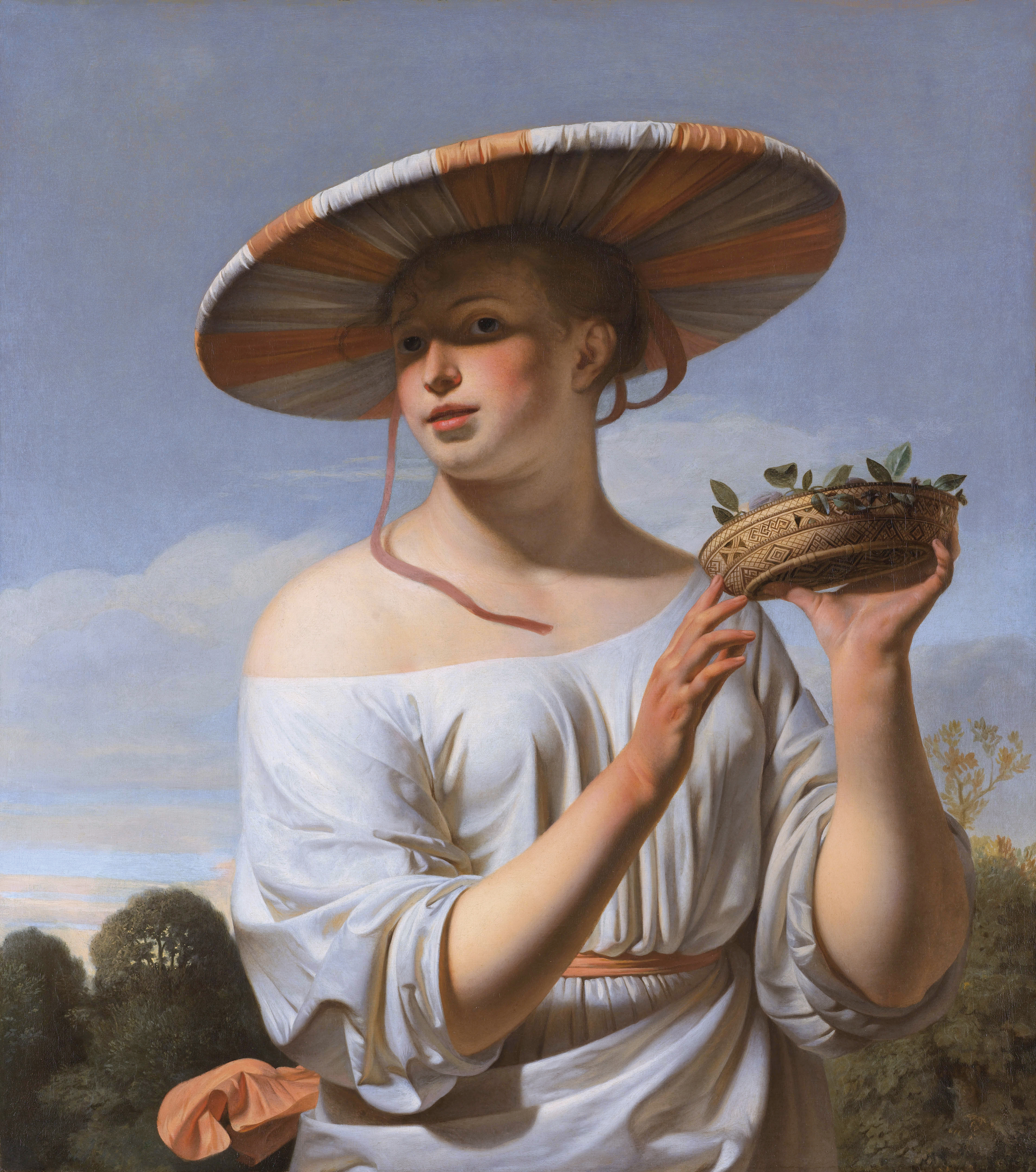
Girl in a Large Hat

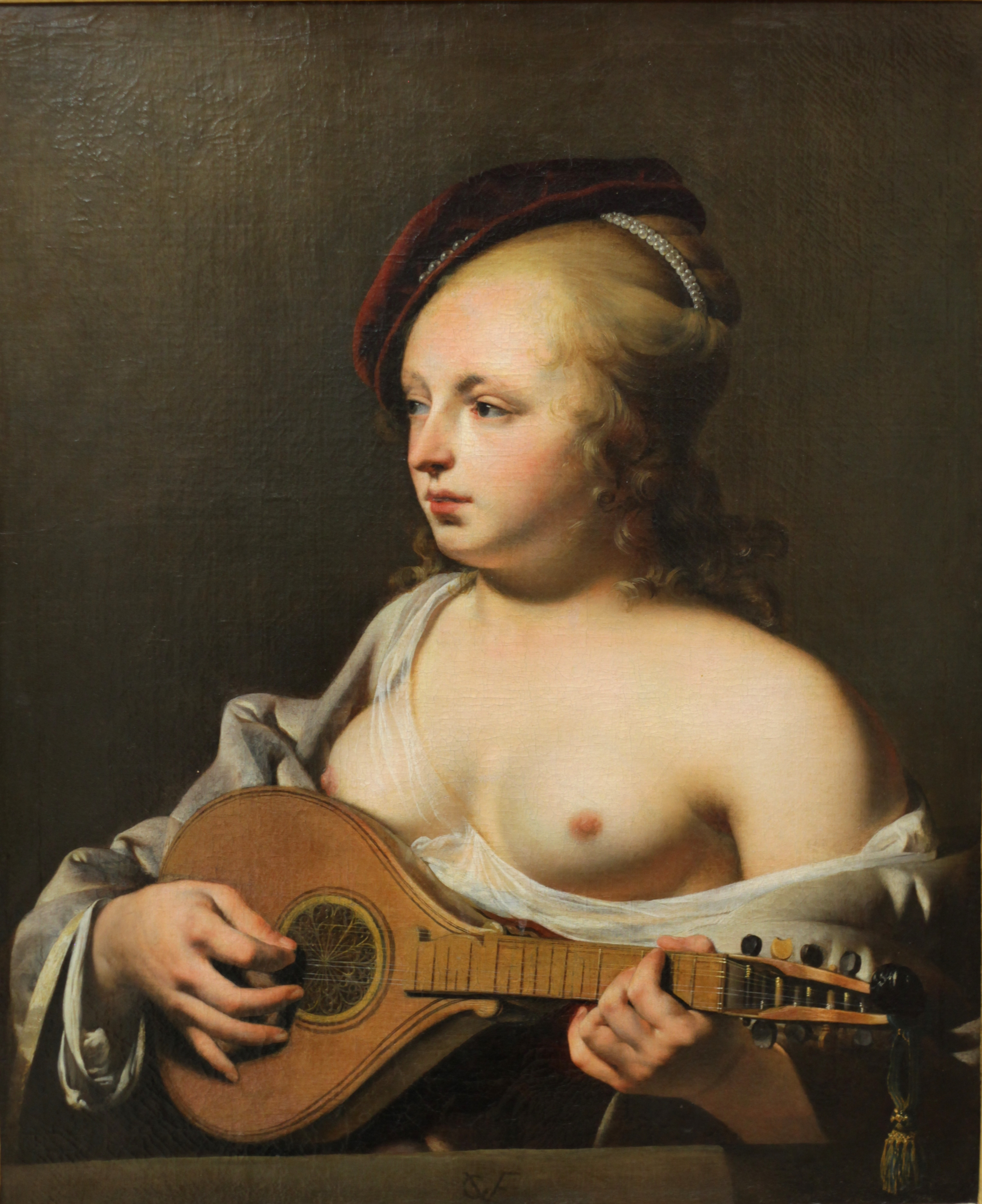
Joueuse de cistre, Musée des Beaux-Arts de Rouen, France

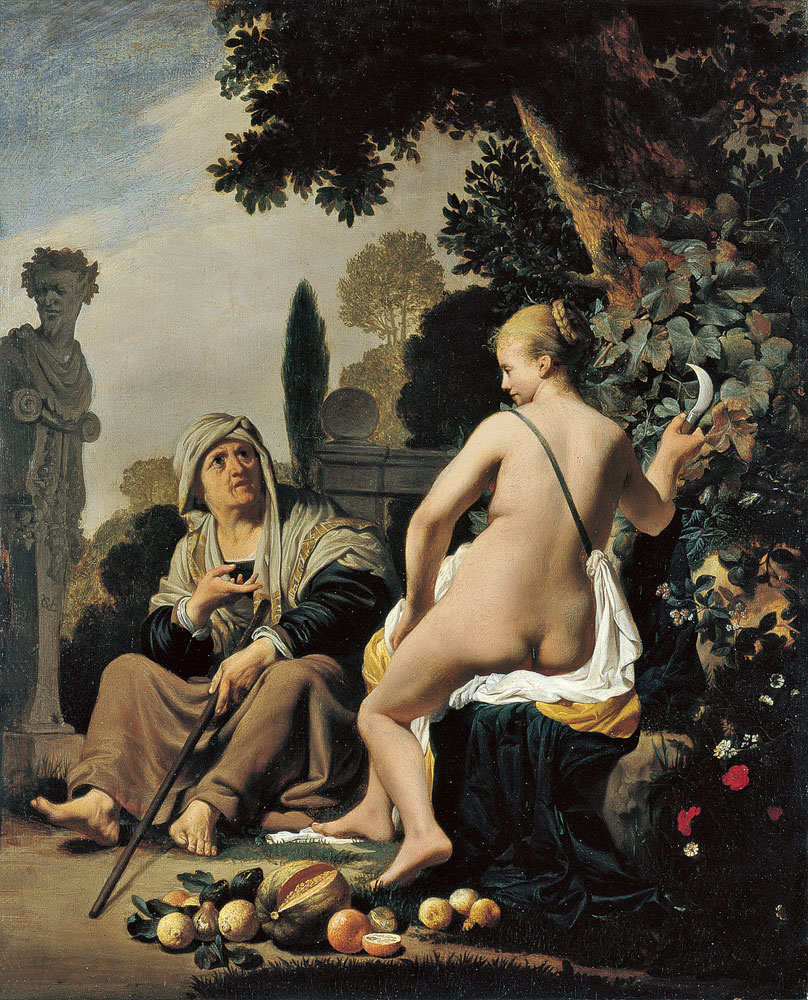
Vertumnus and Pomona, Thyssen-Bornemisza Museum, Madrid.
