= Halfweg =

- Village
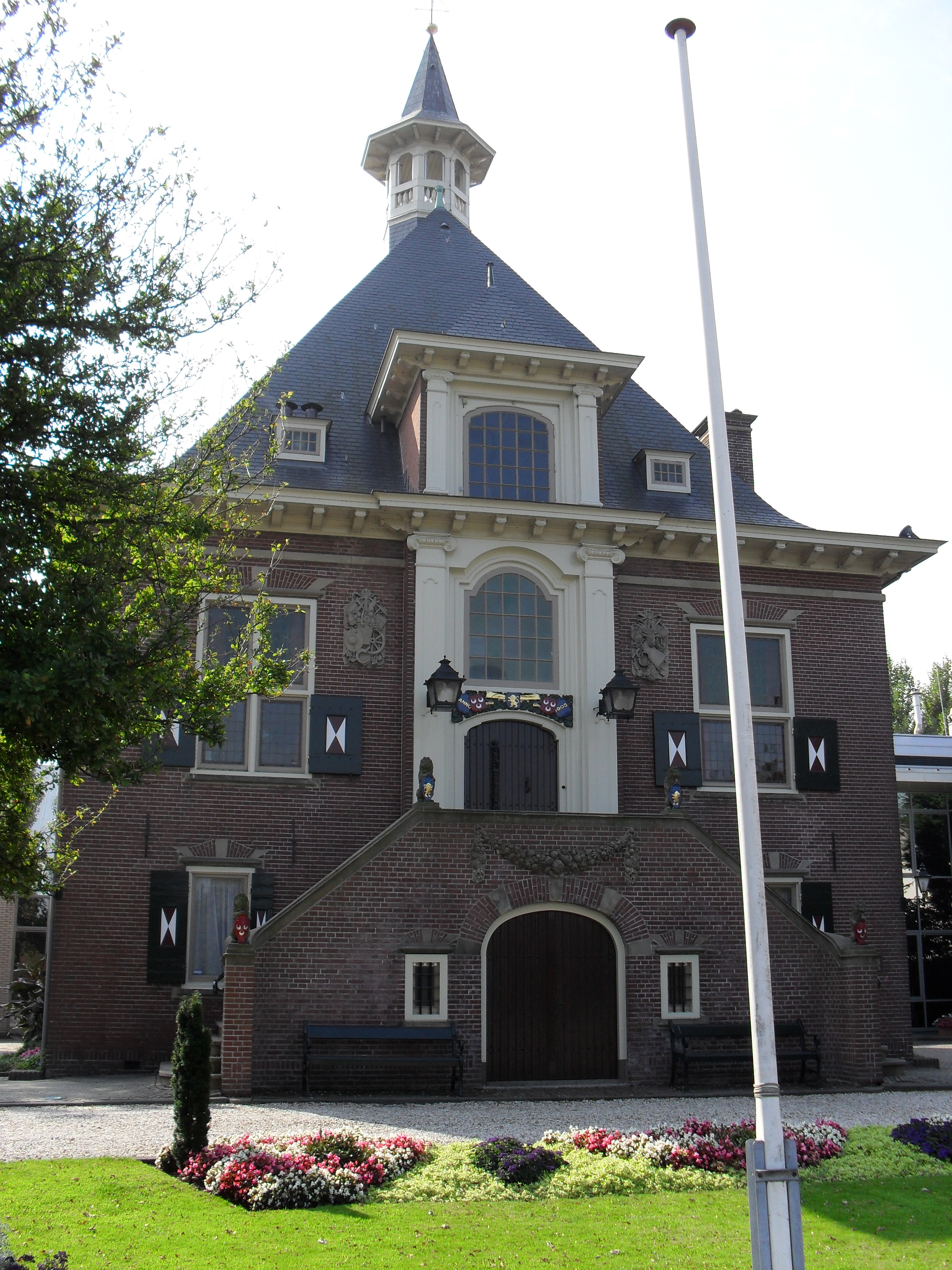
- Town hall of the former municipality of Haarlemmerliede en Spaarnwoude in 2010

- Location in the Netherlands Location in the province of North Holland in the Netherlands
- Coordinates: 52°23′N 4°45′E
- Country: Netherlands
- Province: North Holland
- Municipality: Haarlemmermeer

Area
  - Total: 7.90 km^{2} (3.05 sq mi)
- Elevation: 1.2 m (3.9 ft)

Population (2021)
  - Total: 2,615
  - Density: 331/km^{2} (857/sq mi)
- Time zone: UTC+1 (CET)
  - Summer (DST): UTC+2 (CEST)
- Postal code: 1165
- Dialing code: 020

Halfweg (Dutch pronunciation: [ˈɦɑl(ə)fʋɛx]) is a village in the Dutch province of North Holland. Previously a part of the municipality of Haarlemmerliede en Spaarnwoude, it is currently a part of the municipality of Haarlemmermeer and lies about 8 km (5.0 mi) east of Haarlem. Its name, which translates as "halfway," comes from its location approximately halfway between Haarlem and Amsterdam.

== History ==
In 1632, the Haarlemmertrekvaart, a canal from Amsterdam to Haarlem, opened for passenger traffic by trekschuit (towed barges). At the halfway point the passengers needed to disembark and change boats.

A towpath was laid along the canal, and this route has become the Haarlemmerweg (A200). From 1904 to 1957, Halfweg was a stop on the Amsterdam-Haarlem-Zandvoort electric tram line.

A sugar factory built in the 19th century was run by CSM Suiker fabriek from 1919 onwards. It closed in the 1990s, but the complex with its sugar silos still dominates the city skyline and is called "Sugar City" today.

Until 1876, Halfweg was right on the southern shores of the IJ Bay. With the construction of the North Sea Canal, a channel was dug through the IJ and lined with dikes, after which the remaining portions of the IJ Bay were reclaimed and turned into polders. As a result, the village of Ruigoord, formerly an island of the same name, borders Halfweg in the north, as does the town of Zwanenburg in the south.

== Gallery ==
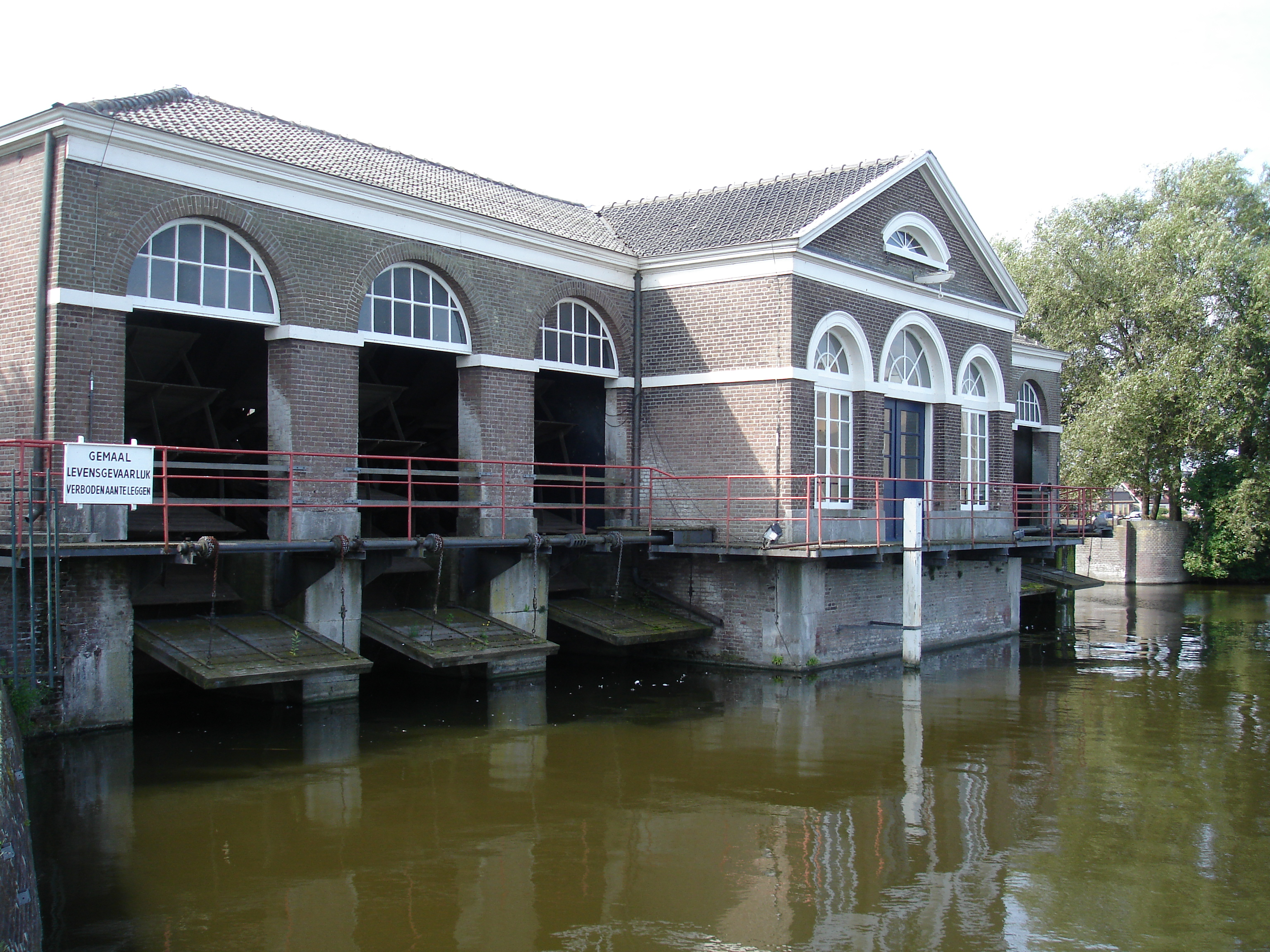
Steam pumping mill at the location of the old sluice. Now Museum Stoomgemaal Halfweg.

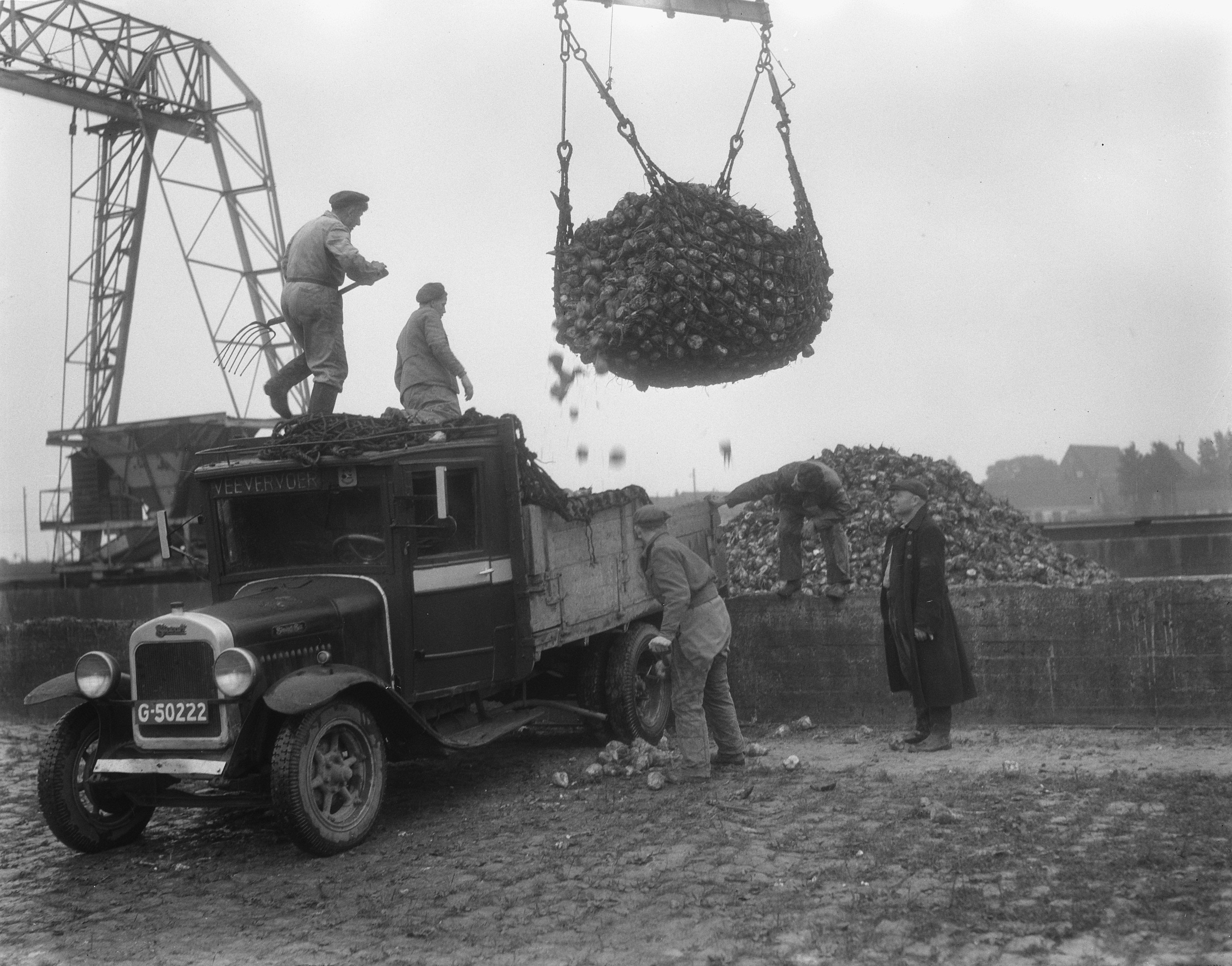
Loading sugar beet in 1950

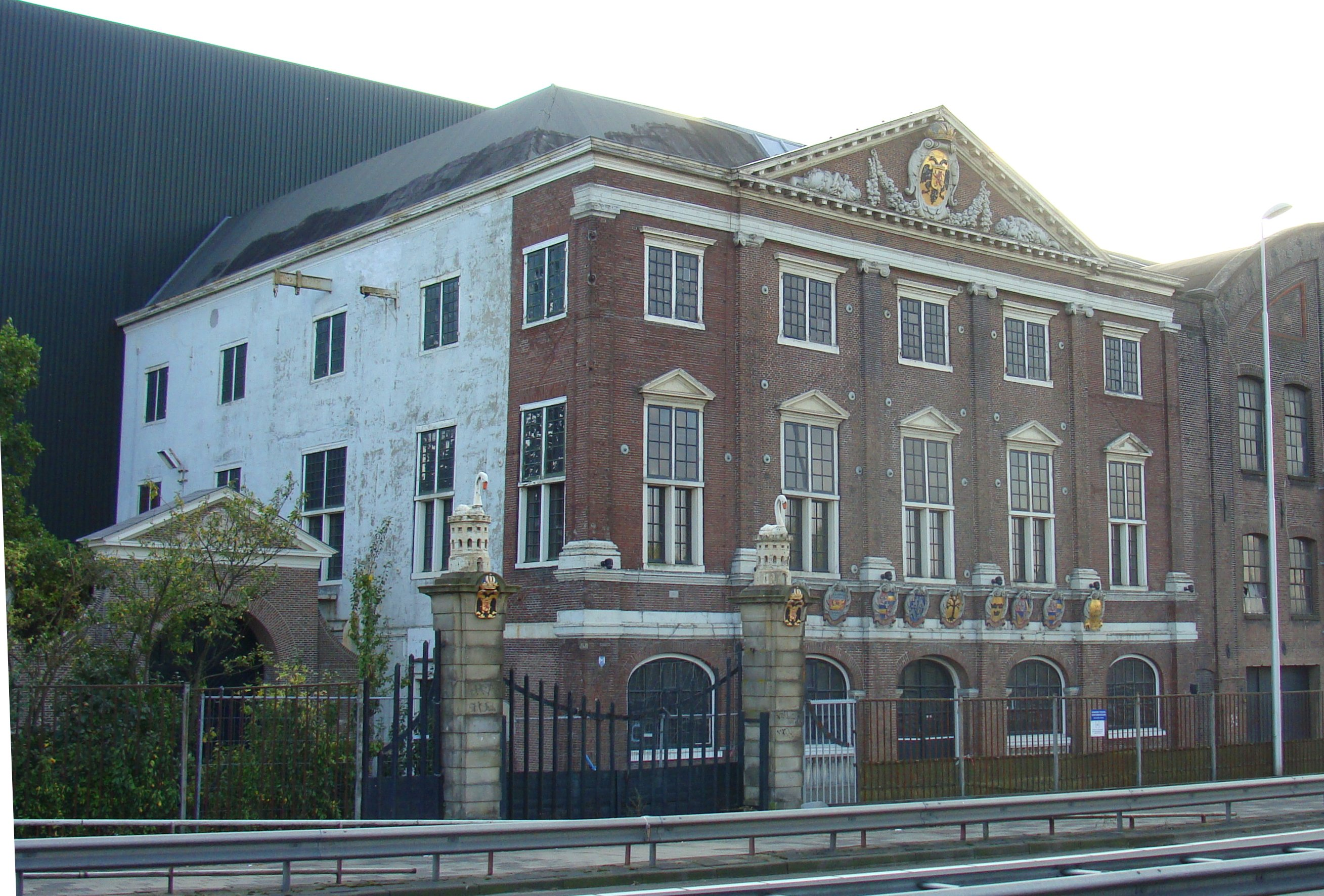
Gemeenlandshuis Zwanenburg, former headquarters of Hoogheemraadschap van Rijnland Water Board agency, now part of Sugar city, Halfweg

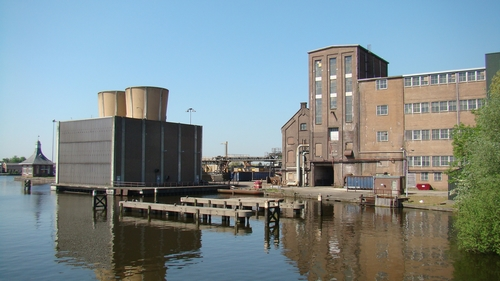
Old sugar factory (silos have been transformed into office space called Sugar City)

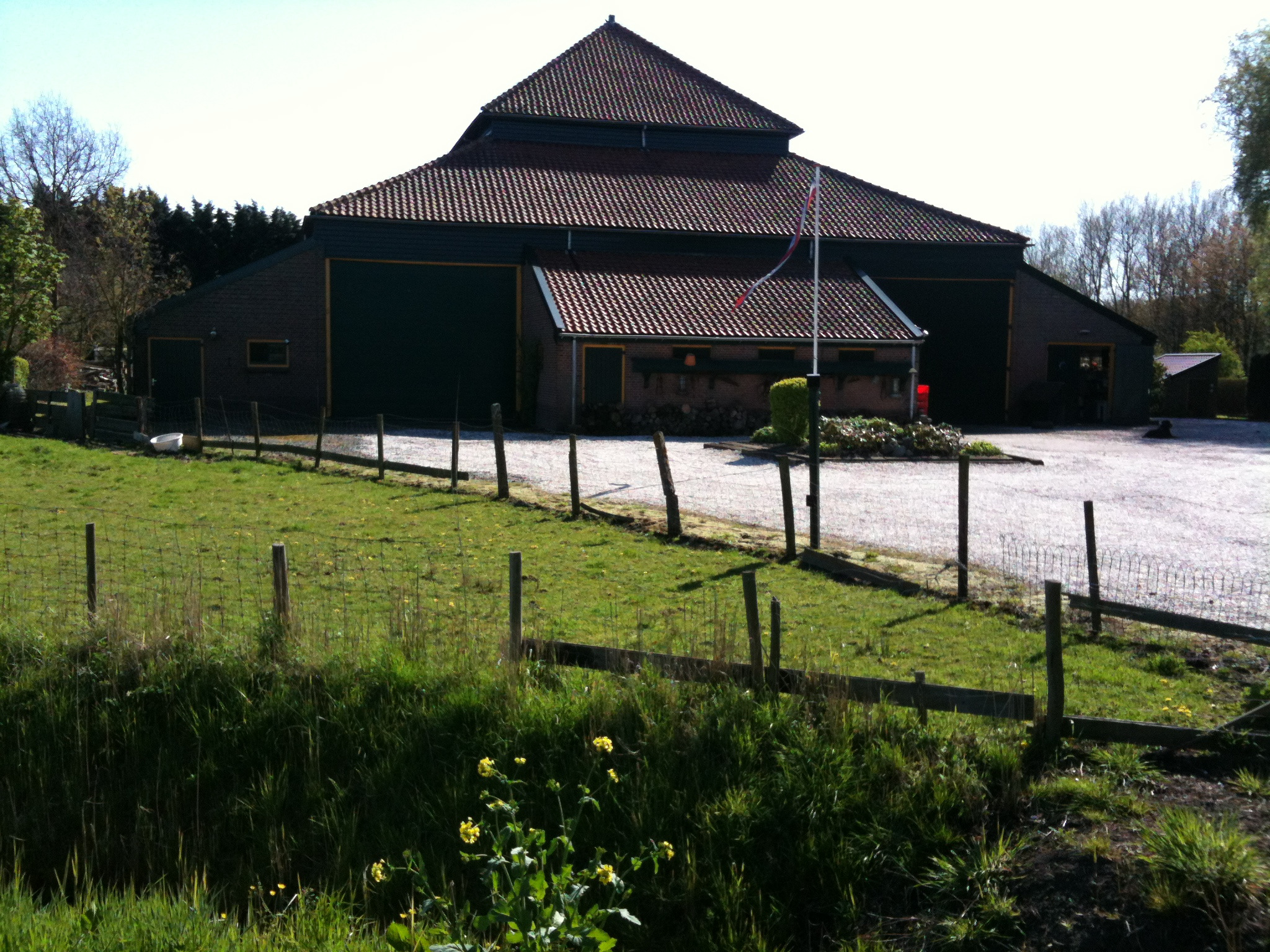
Farm in Halfweg

== See also ==
- Ans Markus
