= Music venue =

Any location used for a concert or musical performance

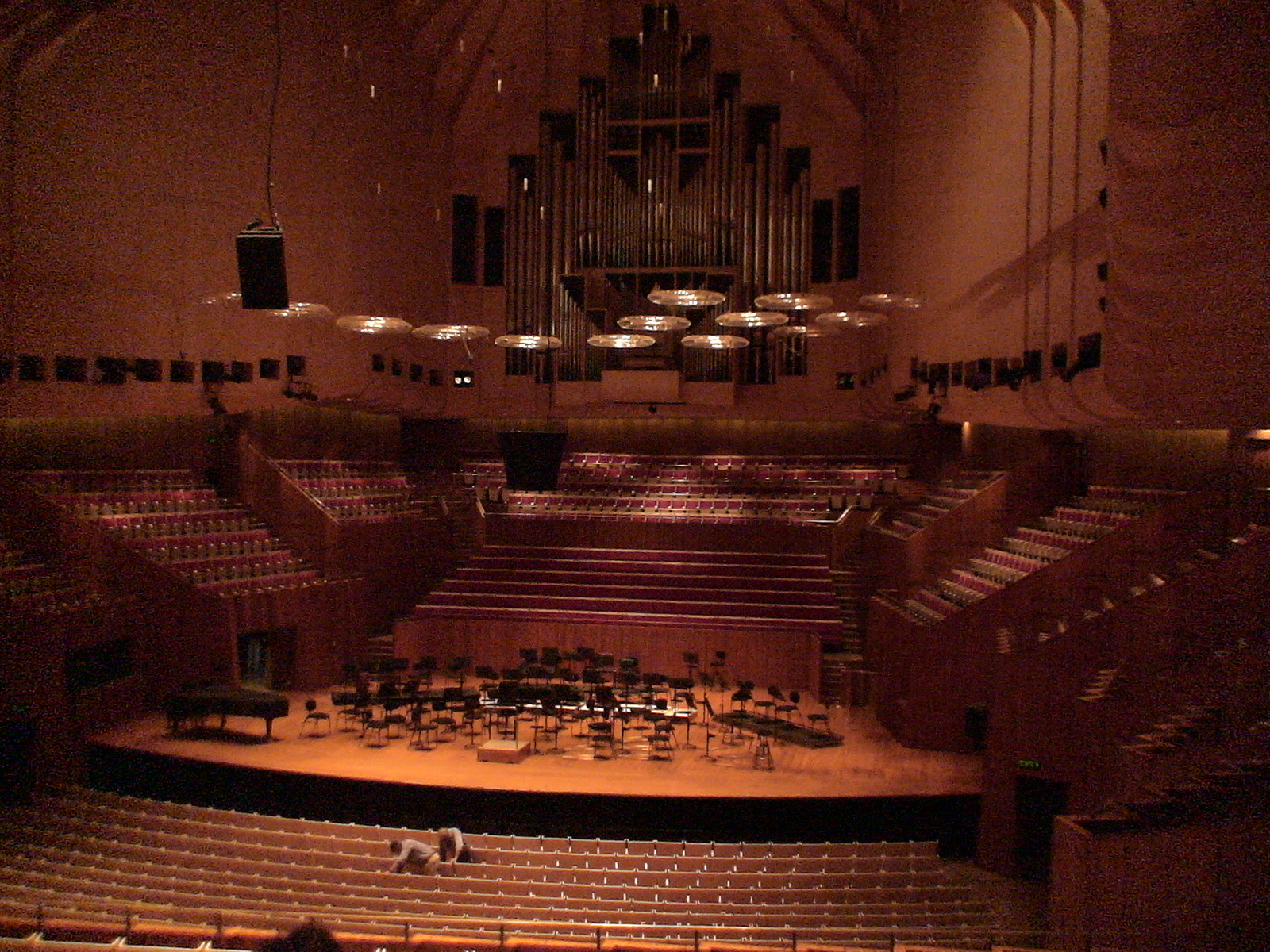
The Sydney Opera House's Concert Hall is an example of a large indoor classical music venue. It is home of the Sydney Symphony Orchestra. The rest of the building contains other amenities common at such music venues, such as cafés, restaurants, bars, and retail outlets.

A music venue is any location used for a concert or musical performance. Music venues range in size and location, from a small coffeehouse for folk music shows or jazz group performances, an outdoor bandshell or bandstand or a concert hall to an indoor sports stadium. Typically, different types of venues host different genres of music. Opera houses, bandshells, and concert halls host classical music performances, whereas public houses ("pubs"), nightclubs, and discothèques offer music in contemporary genres, such as rock, dance, country, and pop.

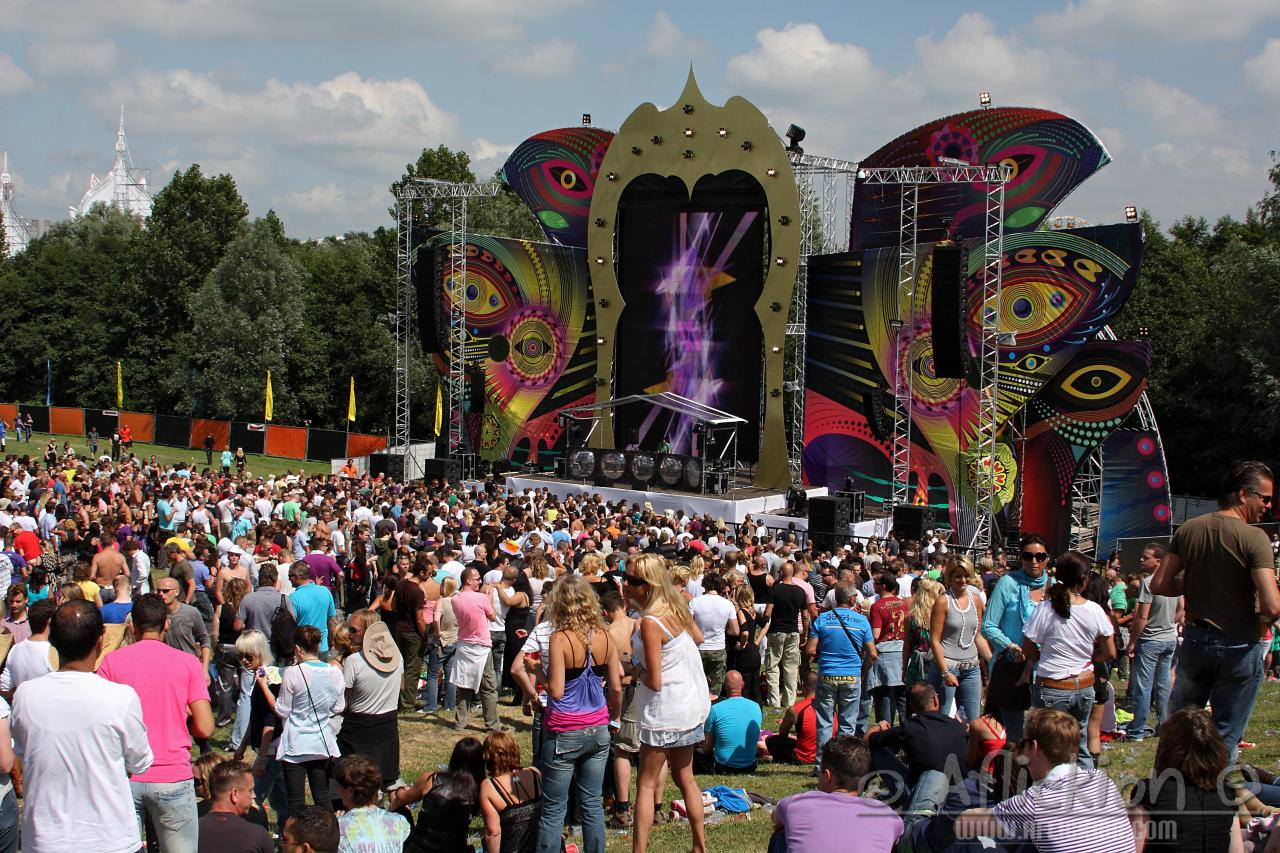
The annual Dance Valley dance music festival in Spaarnwoude, Netherlands. Such music festivals typically include a large temporary stage, are held outdoors, and include other attractions such as food, performance art, and other social activities.

Music venues may be either privately or publicly funded, and may charge for admission. An example of a publicly funded music venue is a bandstand in a municipal park; such outdoor venues typically do not charge for admission. A nightclub is a privately funded venue operated as a profit-making business; venues like these typically charge an entry fee to generate a profit. Music venues do not necessarily host live acts; disc jockeys at a discothèque or nightclub play recorded music through a PA system.

Depending on the type of venue, the opening hours, location and length of performance may differ, as well as the technology used to deliver the music in the venue. Other attractions, such as performance art, standup comedy, or social activities, may also be available, either while music is playing or at other times. For example, at a bar or pub, the house band may be playing live songs while drinks are being served, and between songs, recorded music may be played. Some classes of venues may play live music in the background, such as a performance on a grand piano in a restaurant.

== Characteristics ==
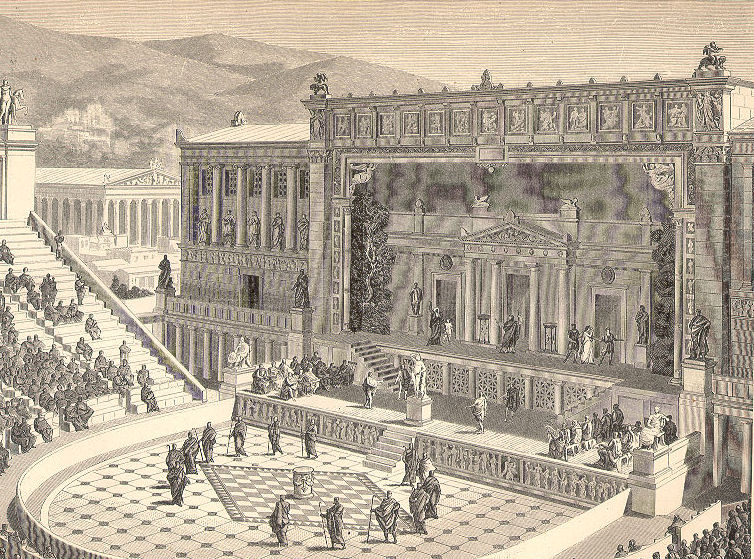
The Theatre of Dionysus in Athens. Greek tragedies often featured choral music performed on-stage.

Music venues can be categorised in a number of ways. Typically, the genre of music played at the venue, whether it is temporary and who owns the venue decide many of the other characteristics.

=== Permanent or temporary venues ===
The majority of music venues are permanent; however, there are temporary music venues. An example of a temporary venue would be one constructed for a music festival.

=== Ownership ===
Music venues are typically either private businesses or public facilities set up by a city, state, or national government. Some music venues are also run by non-government organizations, such as music associations.

=== Genre ===
Some venues only promote and hold shows of one particular genre, such as opera houses. Stadiums, on the other hand, may show rock, classical, and world music.

=== Size and capacity ===
Music venues can be categorised by size and capacity. The smallest venues, coffeeshops and tiny nightclubs have room for tens of spectators; the largest venues, such as stadiums, can hold tens of thousands of spectators.

=== Indoor or outdoor ===
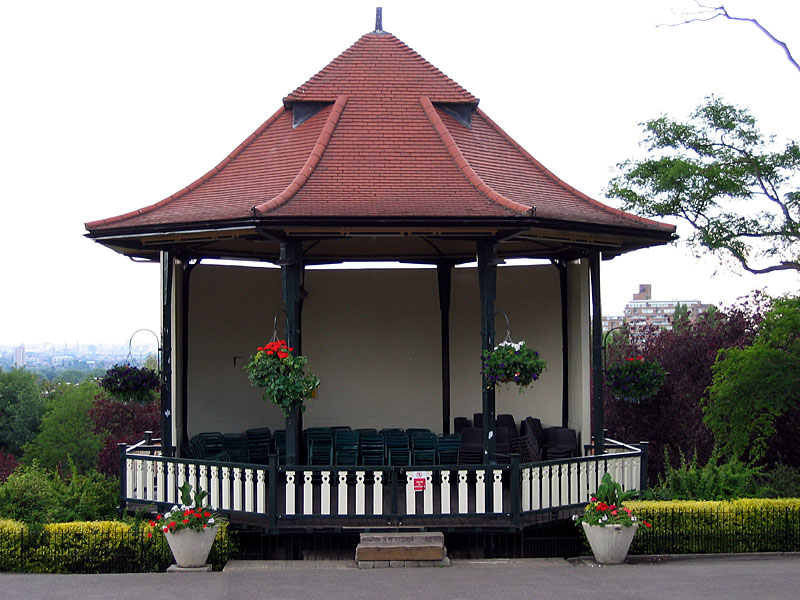
A bandstand is an example of a small outdoor venue. Bandstands are typically circular or semicircular structures that accommodate musical bands performing outdoor concerts, providing shelter from the weather for the musicians.

Music venues are either outdoor or indoor. Examples of outdoor venues include bandstands and bandshells; such outdoor venues provide minimal shelter for performing musicians and are usually located in parks. A temporary music festival is typically an outdoor venue. Examples of indoor venues include public houses, nightclubs, coffee bars, and stadia.

=== Live or recorded music ===
Venues can play live music, recorded music, or a combination of the two, depending on the event or time of day. Discothèques are mainly designed for prerecorded music played by a disc jockey. Live music venues have one or more stages for the performers.

=== Admissions policy and opening hours ===
Venues may be unticketed, casual entry available on the door with a cover charge, or advance tickets only. A dress code may or may not apply.

=== Centrality of performance ===
At some venues, the main focus is watching the show, such as at opera houses or classical recital halls. In some venues that also include food and beverage service, the performers may be playing background music to add to the ambiance.

== Types ==
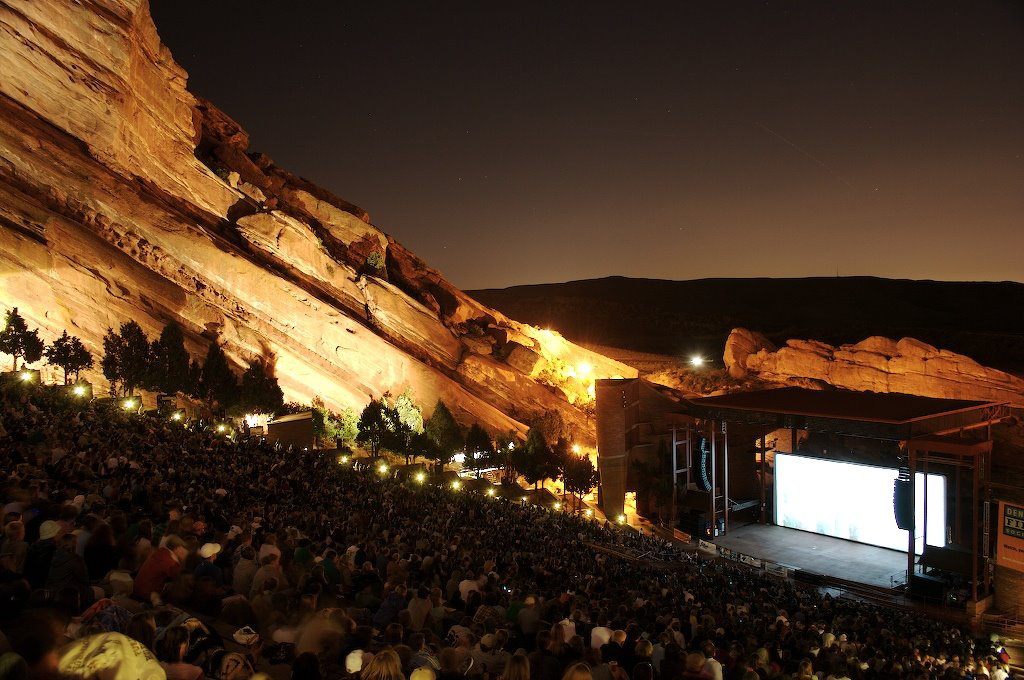
Red Rocks Amphitheatre in Morrison, Colorado

=== Amphitheater ===
Amphitheaters are round- or oval-shaped and usually unroofed. Permanent seating at amphitheaters is generally tiered.

=== Bandshell and bandstand ===
A bandshell is a large, outdoor performing structure typically used by concert bands and orchestras. The roof and the back half of the shell protect musicians from the elements and reflect sound through the open side and out towards the audience. Bandstand is a small outdoor structure.

=== Concert hall ===
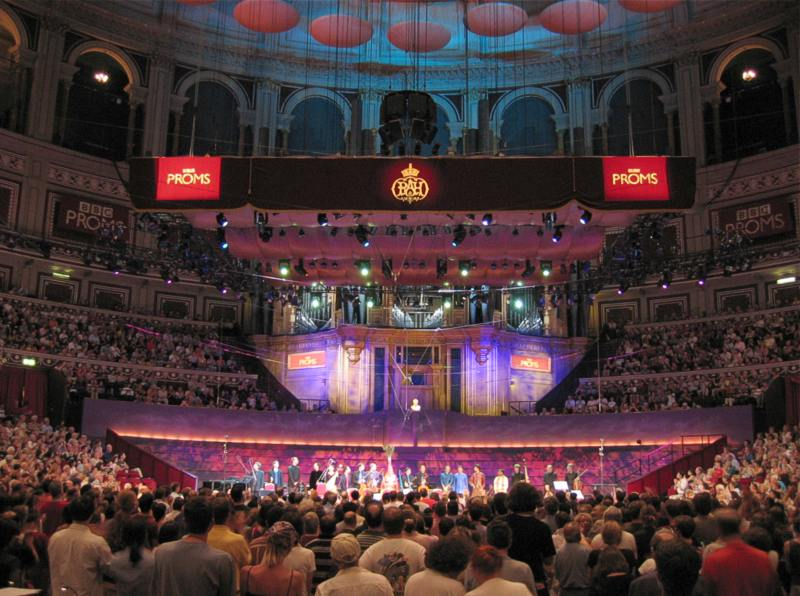
The Royal Albert Hall, pictured during The Proms, is a concert hall.

A concert hall is a performance venue constructed specifically for instrumental classical music. A concert hall may exist as part of a larger performing arts center.

=== Jazz club ===
Jazz clubs are an example of a venue that is dedicated to a specific genre of music. A jazz club is a venue where the primary entertainment is the performance of live jazz music, although some jazz clubs primarily focus on the study and/or promotion of jazz-music. Jazz clubs are usually a type of nightclub or bar, which is licensed to sell alcoholic beverages. Jazz clubs were in large rooms in the eras of orchestral jazz and big band jazz, when bands were large and often augmented by a string section. Large rooms were also more common in the Swing era, because at that time, jazz was popular as a dance music, so the dancers needed space to move. With the transition to 1940s-era styles like bebop and later styles such as soul jazz, small combos of musicians such as quartets and trios were mostly used, and the music became more of a music to listen to, rather than a form of dance music. As a result, smaller clubs with small stages became practical.

In the 2000s, jazz clubs may be found in the basements of larger residential buildings, in storefront locations or in the upper floors of retail businesses. They can be rather small compared to other music venues, such as rock music clubs, reflecting the intimate atmosphere of jazz shows and long-term decline in popular interest in jazz. Despite being called "clubs", these venues are usually not exclusive. Some clubs, however, have a cover charge if a live band is playing. Some jazz clubs host "jam sessions" after hours or on early evenings of the week. At jam sessions, both professional musicians and advanced amateurs will typically share the stage.

=== Live house ===
In Japan, small live music clubs are known as live houses (ライブハウス), especially featuring rock, jazz, blues, and folk music, and have existed since the 1970s, now being found across the country. The term is a Japanese coinage (wasei eigo) and is mainly used in East Asia. The oldest live house is Coffee House Jittoku (拾得, after the Chinese monk Shide "Foundling") in Kyoto, founded in 1973 in an old sake warehouse. Soon afterwards, the idea spread through Japan. In recent years, similar establishments started to appear in big cities in South Korea, Taiwan, and China; many of them are also locally called "live houses."

=== Opera house ===
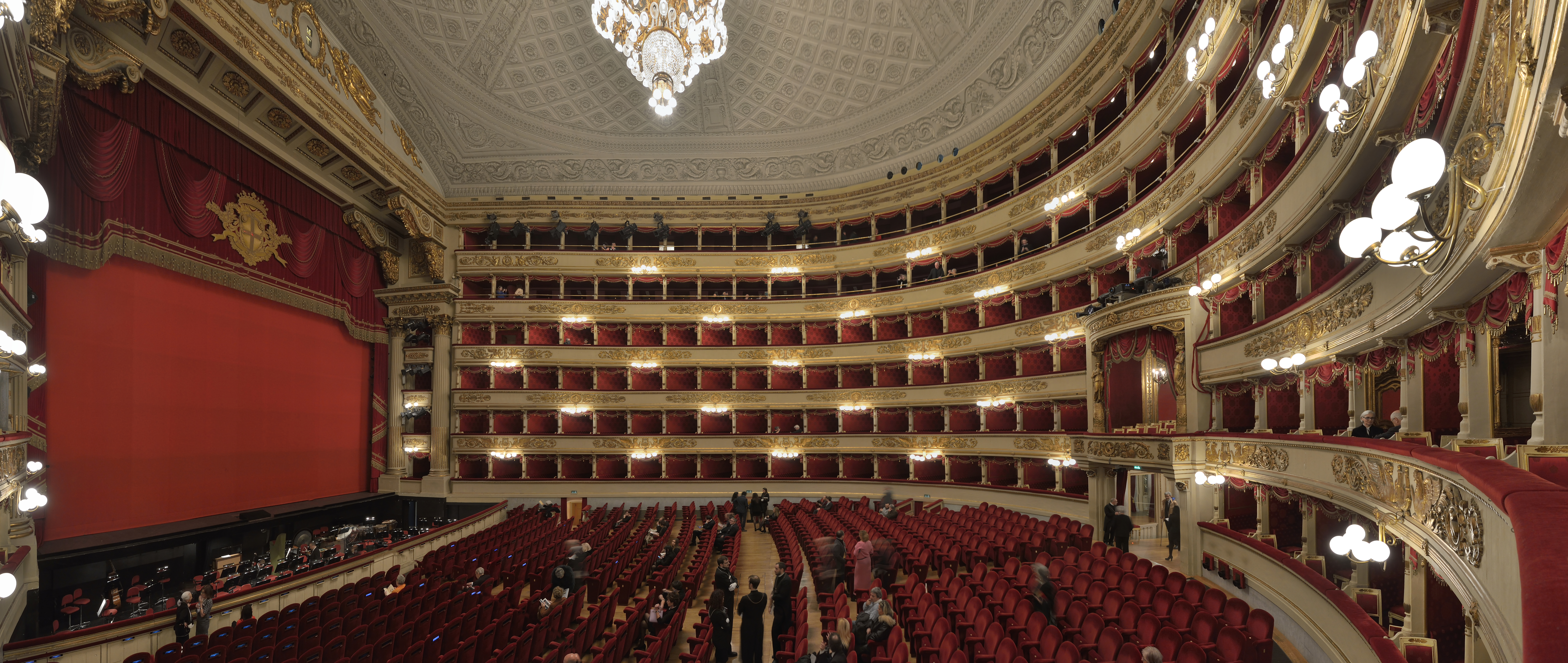
The world-renowned La Scala opera house in Milan, Italy

An opera house is a theatre venue constructed specifically for opera. It consists of a stage, an orchestra pit, audience seating, and backstage facilities for costumes and set building. While some venues are constructed specifically for operas, other opera houses are part of larger performing arts centers. Indeed the term opera house itself is often used as a term of prestige for any large performing-arts center.

The Teatro San Carlo in Naples, opened in 1737, introduced the horseshoe-shaped auditorium, the oldest in the world, a model for the Italian theater. On this model were built subsequent theaters in Italy and Europe, among others, the court theater of the Palace of Caserta, which became the model for other theaters. Given the popularity of opera in 18th and 19th century Europe, opera houses are usually large, often containing more than 1,000 seats. Traditionally, Europe's major opera houses built in the 19th century contained between about 1,500 to 3,000 seats, examples being Brussels' La Monnaie (after renovations, 1,700 seats), Odessa Opera and Ballet Theater (with 1,636), Warsaw's Grand Theatre (the main auditorium with 1,841), Paris' Palais Garnier (with 2,200), the Royal Opera House in London (with 2,268), and the Vienna State Opera (the new auditorium with 2,280). Modern opera houses of the 20th century such as New York's Metropolitan Opera House (with 3,800) and the War Memorial Opera House in San Francisco (with 3,146) are larger. Many operas are better suited to being presented in smaller theaters, such as Venice's La Fenice with about 1,000 seats.

In a traditional opera house, the auditorium is U-shaped, with the length of the sides determining the audience capacity. Around this are tiers of balconies, and often, nearer to the stage, are boxes (small partitioned sections of a balcony). Since the latter part of the 19th century, opera houses often have an orchestra pit, where many orchestra players may be seated at a level below the audience, so that they can play without overwhelming the singing voices. This is especially true of Wagner's Bayreuth Festspielhaus where the pit is partially covered. The size of an opera orchestra varies, but for some operas, oratorios and other works, it may be very large; for some romantic period works (or for many of the operas of Richard Strauss), it can be more than 100 players. Similarly, an opera may have a large cast of characters, chorus, dancers and supernumeraries. Therefore, a major opera house will have extensive dressing room facilities. Opera houses often have on-premises set and costume building shops and facilities for storage of costumes, make-up, masks, and stage properties, and may also have rehearsal spaces.

Major opera houses throughout the world often have highly mechanized stages, with large stage elevators permitting heavy sets to be changed rapidly. At the Metropolitan Opera, for instance, sets are often changed during the action, as the audience watches, with singers rising or descending as they sing. This occurs in the Met's productions of operas such as Aida and Tales of Hoffmann. London's Royal Opera House, which was remodeled in the late 1990s, retained the original 1858 auditorium at its core, but added completely new backstage and wing spaces as well as an additional performance space and public areas. Much the same happened in the remodeling of Milan's La Scala opera house between 2002 and 2004.

Although stage, lighting and other production aspects of opera houses often make use of the latest technology, traditional opera houses have not used sound reinforcement systems with microphones and loudspeakers to amplify the singers, since trained opera singers are normally able to project their unamplified voices in the hall. Since the 1990s, however, some opera houses have begun using a subtle form of sound reinforcement called acoustic enhancement.

=== Public houses and nightclubs ===
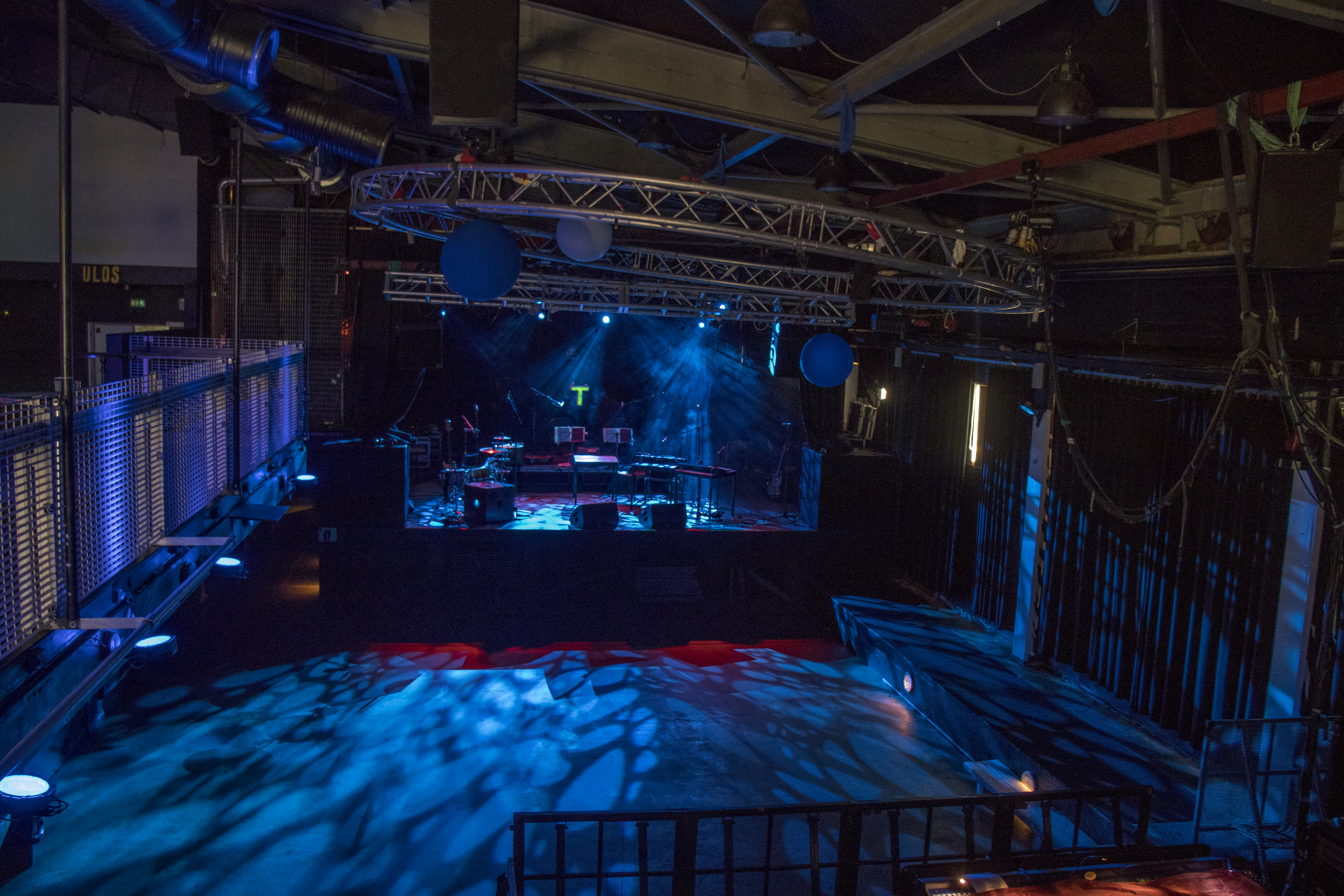
A concert hall at Nosturi in Punavuori, Helsinki, Finland

A pub, or public house, is an establishment licensed to sell alcoholic drinks, which traditionally include beer (such as ale) and cider. It is a social drinking establishment and a prominent part of British, Irish, Breton, New Zealand, Canadian, South African, and Australian cultures. In many places, especially in villages, a pub is the focal point of the community. In his 17th-century diary, Samuel Pepys described the pub as "the heart of England". Most pubs focus on offering beers, ales and similar drinks. As well, pubs often sell wines, spirits, and soft drinks, meals and snacks. Pubs may be venues for pub songs and live music. During the 1970s pubs provided an outlet for a number of bands, such as Kilburn and the High Roads, Dr. Feelgood, and The Kursaal Flyers, who formed a musical genre called pub rock that was a precursor to Punk music. A 2024 report by the UK Parliament's Culture, Media and Sport Committee found that the UK experienced a net loss of 125 grassroots music venues in a single year, equivalent to over a tenth of the sector, and described grassroots venues as "the backbone of the UK's ┬ú6.7 billion music industry".

A nightclub is an entertainment venue and bar that usually operates late into the night. A nightclub is generally distinguished from regular bars, pubs or taverns by the inclusion of a stage for live music, one or more dance floor areas and a DJ booth, where a DJ plays recorded music. The upmarket nature of nightclubs can be seen in the inclusion of VIP areas in some nightclubs, for celebrities and their guests. Nightclubs are much more likely than pubs or sports bars to use bouncers to screen prospective clubgoers for entry. Some nightclub bouncers do not admit people with informal clothing or gang apparel as part of a dress code. The busiest nights for a nightclub are Friday and Saturday night. Most clubs or club nights cater to certain music genres, such as house music or hip hop. Many clubs have recurring club nights on different days of the week. Most club nights focus on a particular genre or sound for branding effects.

=== Stadiums and arenas ===
A stadium is a place or venue for (mostly) outdoor sports, concerts, or other events and consists of a field or stage either partly or completely surrounded by a tiered structure designed to allow spectators to stand or sit and view the event. Although concerts, such as classical music, had been presented in them for decades, beginning in the 1960s stadiums began to be used as live venues for popular music, giving rise to the term "stadium rock", particularly for forms of hard rock and progressive rock. The origins of stadium rock are sometimes dated to when The Beatles played Shea Stadium in New York in 1965. Also important was the use of large stadiums for American tours by bands in the later 1960s, such as The Rolling Stones, Grand Funk Railroad, and Led Zeppelin. The tendency developed in the mid-1970s as the increased power of amplification and sound systems allowed the use of larger and larger venues. Smoke, fireworks and sophisticated lighting shows became staples of arena rock performances. Key acts from this era included Journey, REO Speedwagon, Boston, Foreigner, Styx, Kiss, Peter Frampton, and Queen. In the 1980s, arena rock became dominated by glam metal bands, following the lead of Aerosmith and including Mötley Crüe, Quiet Riot, W.A.S.P., and Ratt. Since the 1980s, rock, pop, and folk stars, including the Grateful Dead, Madonna, Britney Spears, Beyoncé, and Taylor Swift, have undertaken large-scale stadium based concert tours.

=== Theater ===
A theater or playhouse is a structure where theatrical works or plays are performed, or other performances such as musical concerts may be produced. A theatre used for opera performances is called an opera house. The theater serves to define the performance and audience spaces. The facility is traditionally organized to provide support areas for performers, the technical crew and the audience members. There are as many types of theaters as there are types of performance. Theaters may be built specifically for a certain types of productions, they may serve for more general performance needs or they may be adapted or converted for use as a theater. They may range from open-air amphitheaters to ornate, cathedral-like structures to simple, undecorated rooms or black box theaters. Some theaters may have a fixed performing area (in most theaters this is known as the stage), while some theaters, such as "black box theaters", may not. For the audience, theaters may include balconies or galleries, boxes, typically considered the most prestigious area of the house, and "house seats", known as "the best seats in the house", giving the best view of the stage.

== See also ==
- Art space
- Auditorium
- Concert hall
- Cultural centre
- History of music
- Music festival
- Music gym
- Music venues in the Netherlands
- List of concert venues
