= Haarlemmertrekvaart =

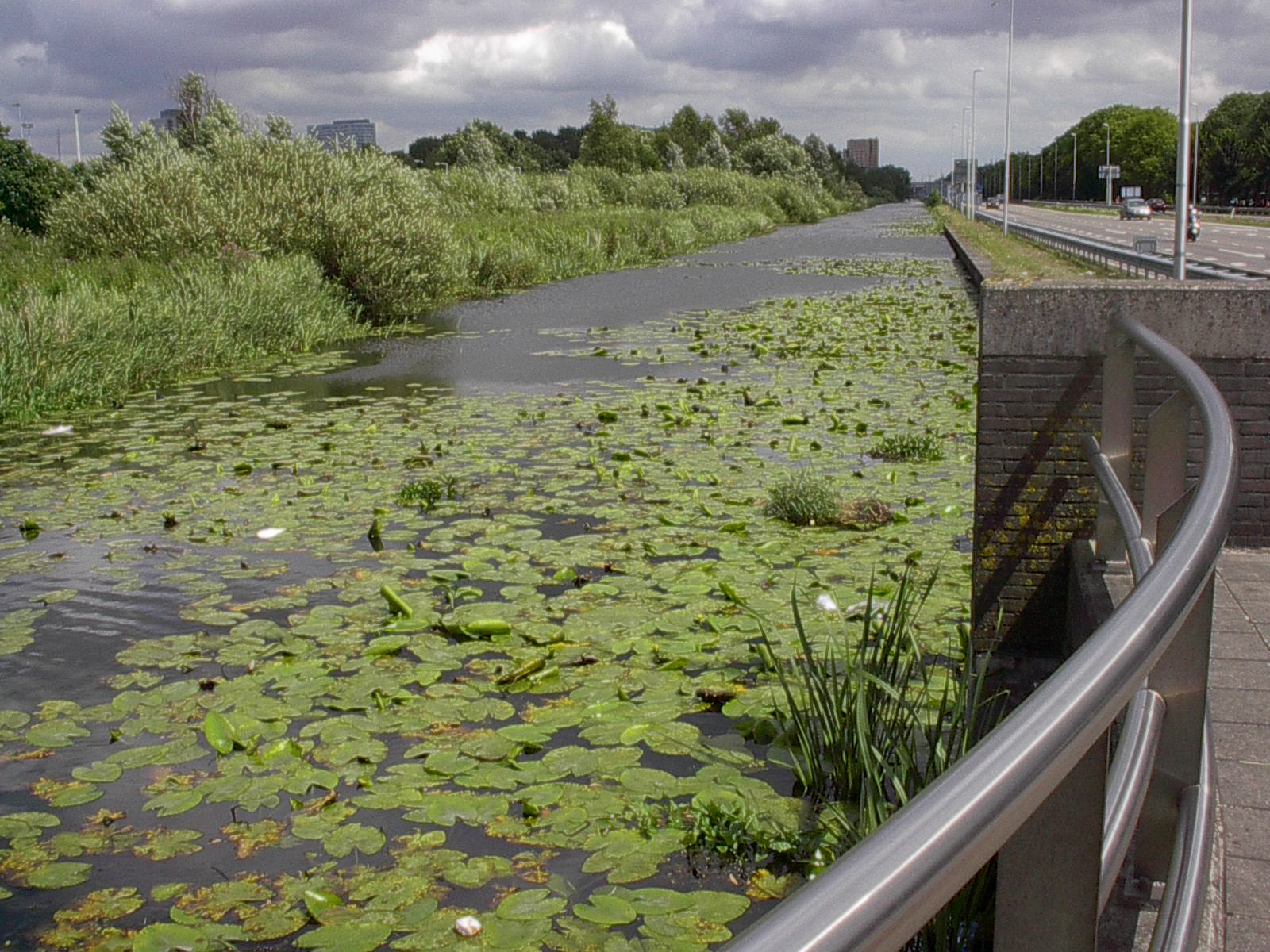
- The canal near Amsterdam
- Country: Netherlands

Geography
- Direction: East
- Start point: Haarlem
- End point: Amsterdam
- Beginning coordinates: 52°23′02″N 4°45′18″E
- Ending coordinates: 52°23′08″N 4°52′56″E

The Haarlemmertrekvaart [ˌhaːrlɛmərˈtrɛkfaːrt] (Haarlem's Tow-Canal) is a canal between Amsterdam and Haarlem in the province of North Holland, the Netherlands. It was dug in 1631, making it the oldest tow-canal in Holland. Travel on such canals was historically done by barges (or trekschuit in Dutch) which were towed by animals (and sometimes by man-power) on a path along the canal's edge (towpath).

== History ==
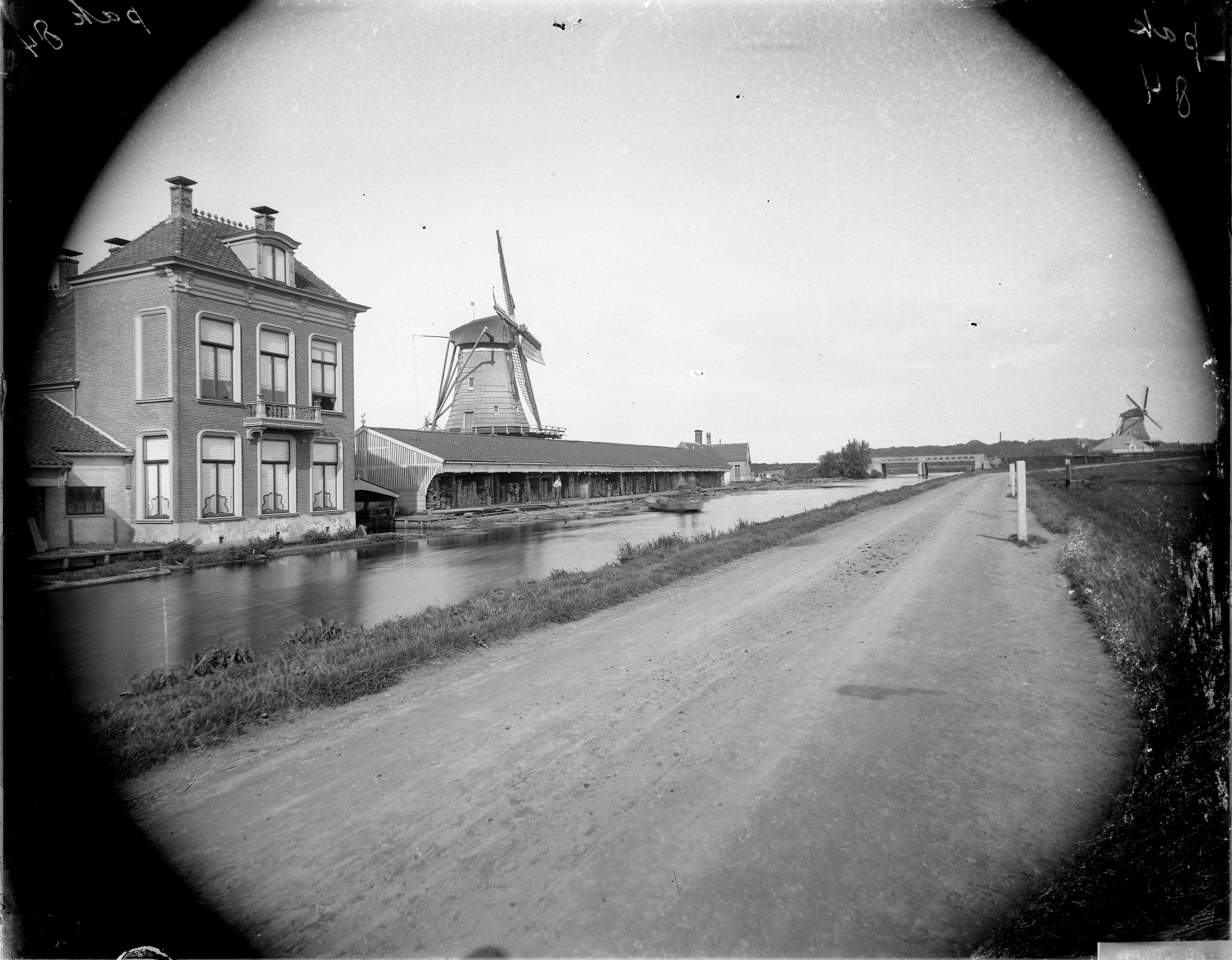
The Haarlemmer trekvaart and the Haarlemmerweg late 19th century

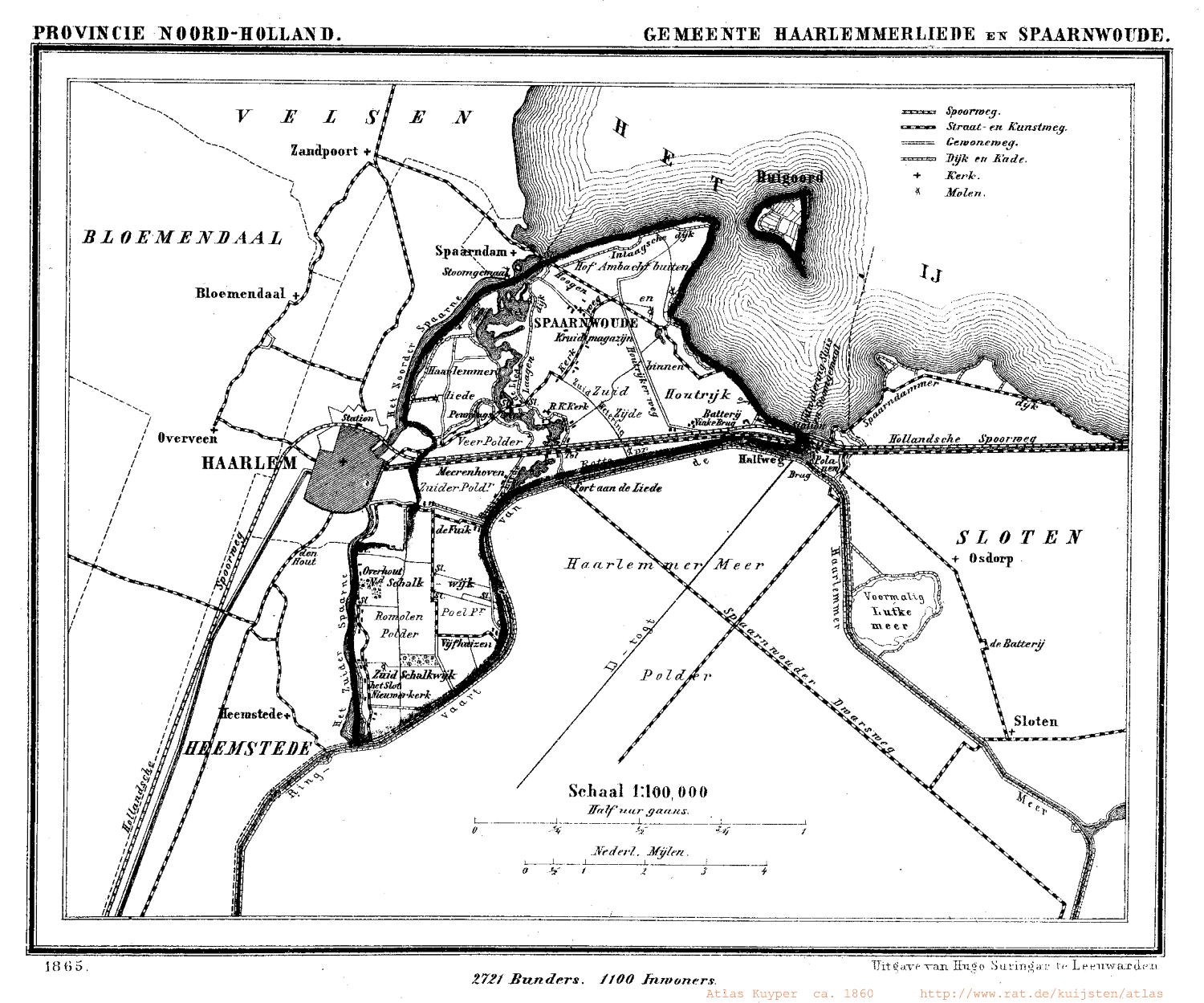
Old map showing trekvaart route

Until the beginning of the 17th century, the primary waterway between Amsterdam and Haarlem was the IJ, a bay of the Zuiderzee. The land route was over the twisty dike along this bay. In 1631 construction began and the canal was dug in a virtually straight line to guarantee the shortest route. It shortened the waterway from Haarlem to Amsterdam considerably. Until that time, boats needed to travel up the Spaarne river to pass the narrow sluice gate at Spaarndam, to reach the IJ. Similarly, the towpath shortened the route considerably for land traffic. Prior to this route, coaches traveling by land would leave Haarlem over the Oude Weg up to the Liede, where they would cross at Penningsveer (a ferry for a penny), to Spaarnwoude and along the IJdijk (on older maps, Spaarndammerdijk) to Amsterdam.

The first trekschuit 'sailed' in 1632 between Amsterdam and Haarlem, and could carry 30 passengers. Because of the sluice gate between the Haarlem Lake and the IJ, the canal was not continuous. The passengers needed to disembark and change boats at this point, which was halfway, and where the town of Halfweg (meaning "halfway") formed. Commercial freight was not allowed to use the canal, and a complicated tax system on water transport kept the trekschuit system a stable means of passenger transport for centuries. The success of the Haarlemmertrekvaart led to the extension of the canal from Haarlem to Leiden by means of the Leidsevaart in 1657. When the Haarlem Lake became a polder in 1852, the former sluice gate became a steam-driven drainage pump, which is now a museum.

A railway parallel to the canal was built in 1839 which rendered passenger transport on the Haarlemmertrekvaart obsolete. While there is no longer any shipping on the canal, it is still being used for water management.

== Gallery ==
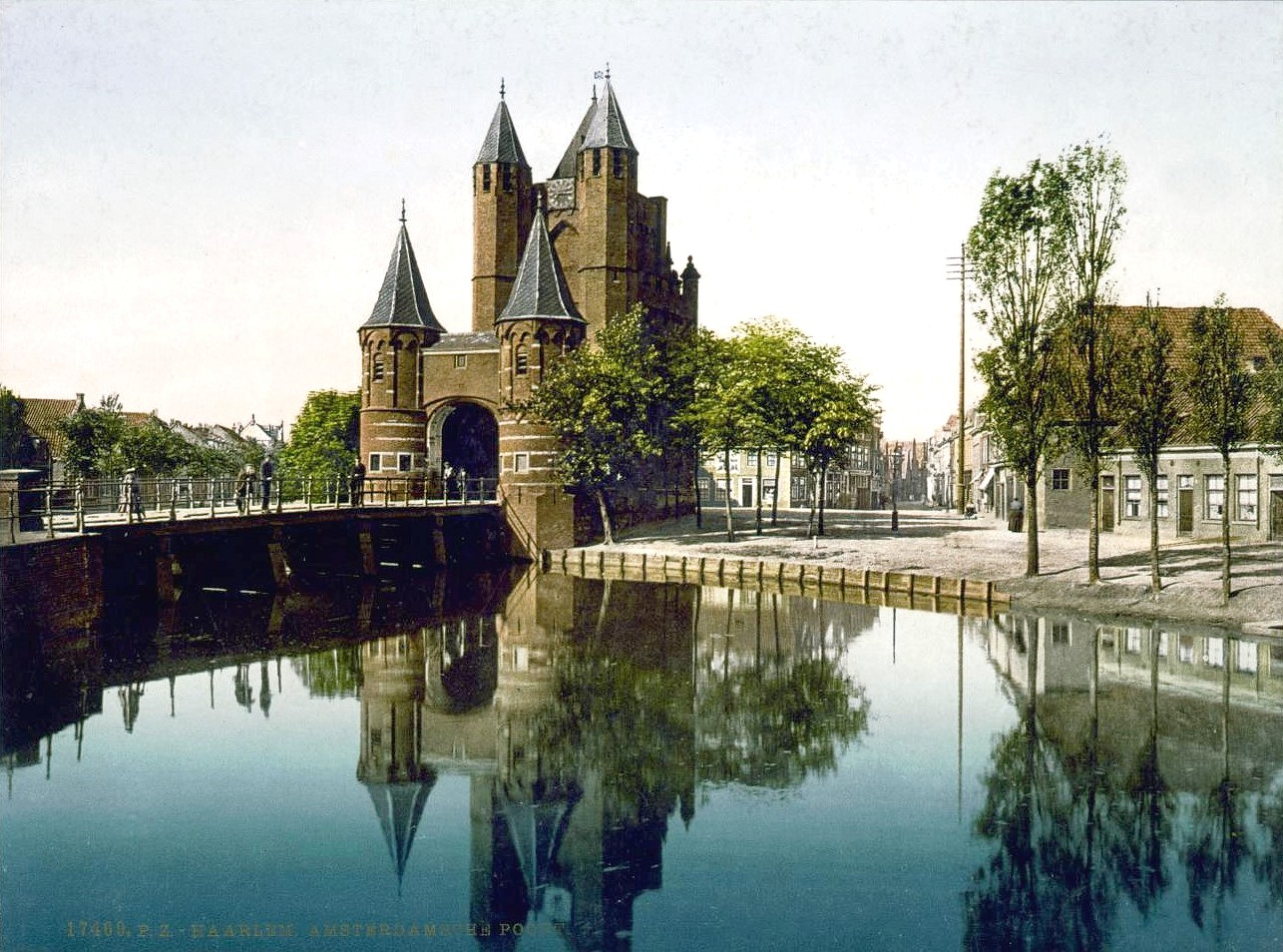
The start of the canal on the Haarlem

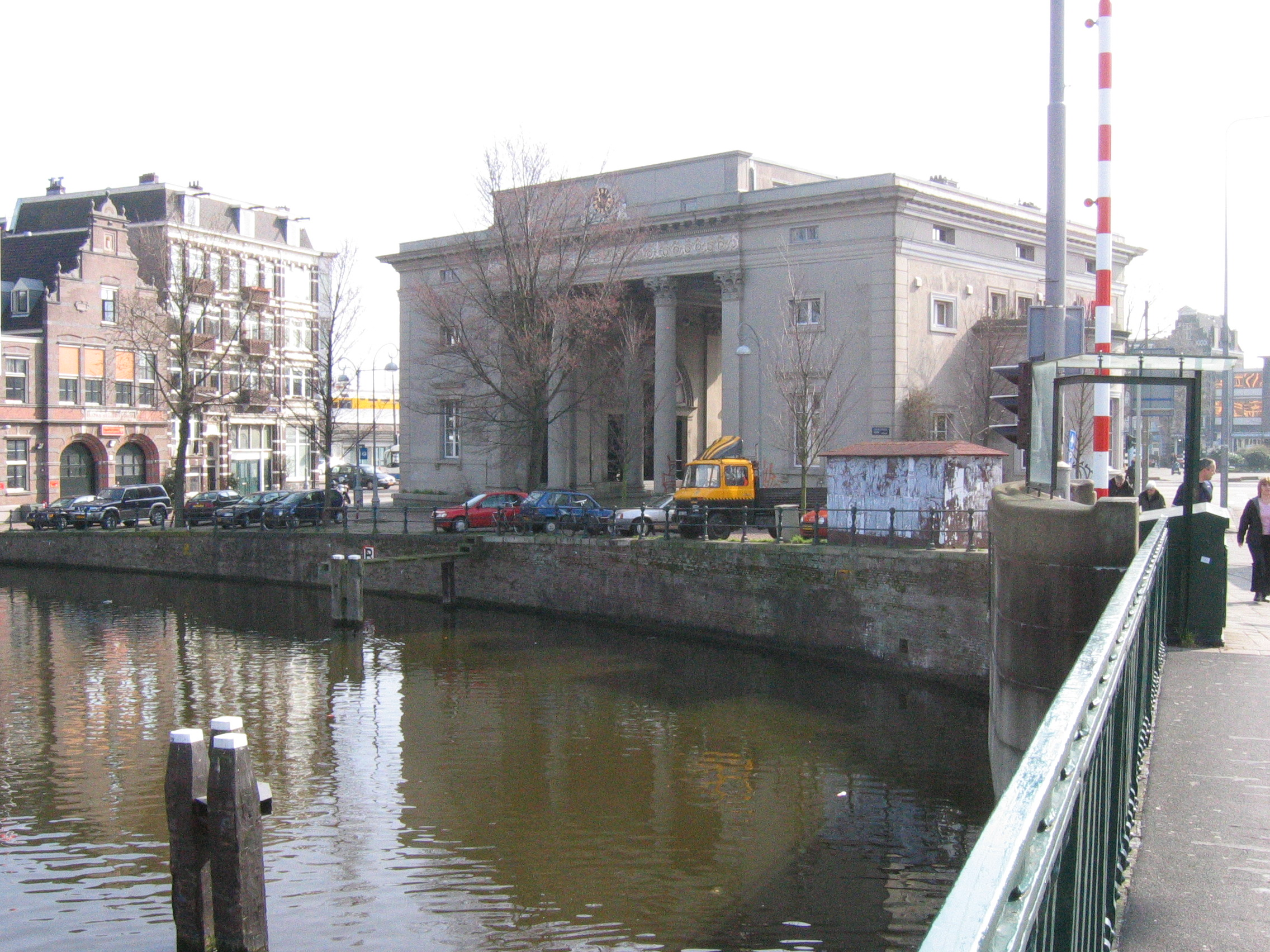
The start of the canal on the Amsterdam side: The gate to Haarlem

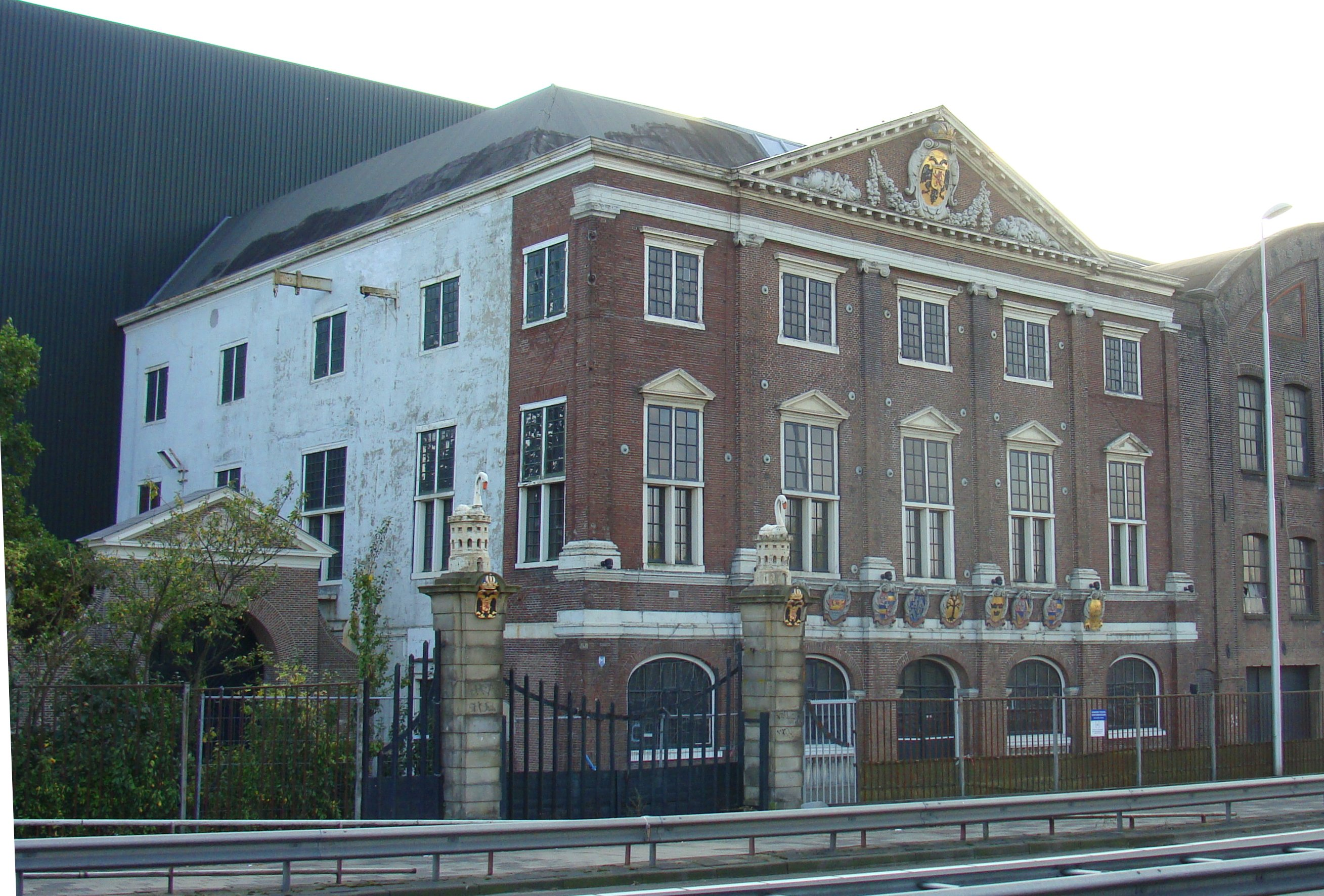
Halfway along the route, the Water Board had their main headquarters, where a sluice gate joined the waters of the Haarlem Lake to the IJ. This was the start of the town Halfweg
