= Penningsveer =

- Town
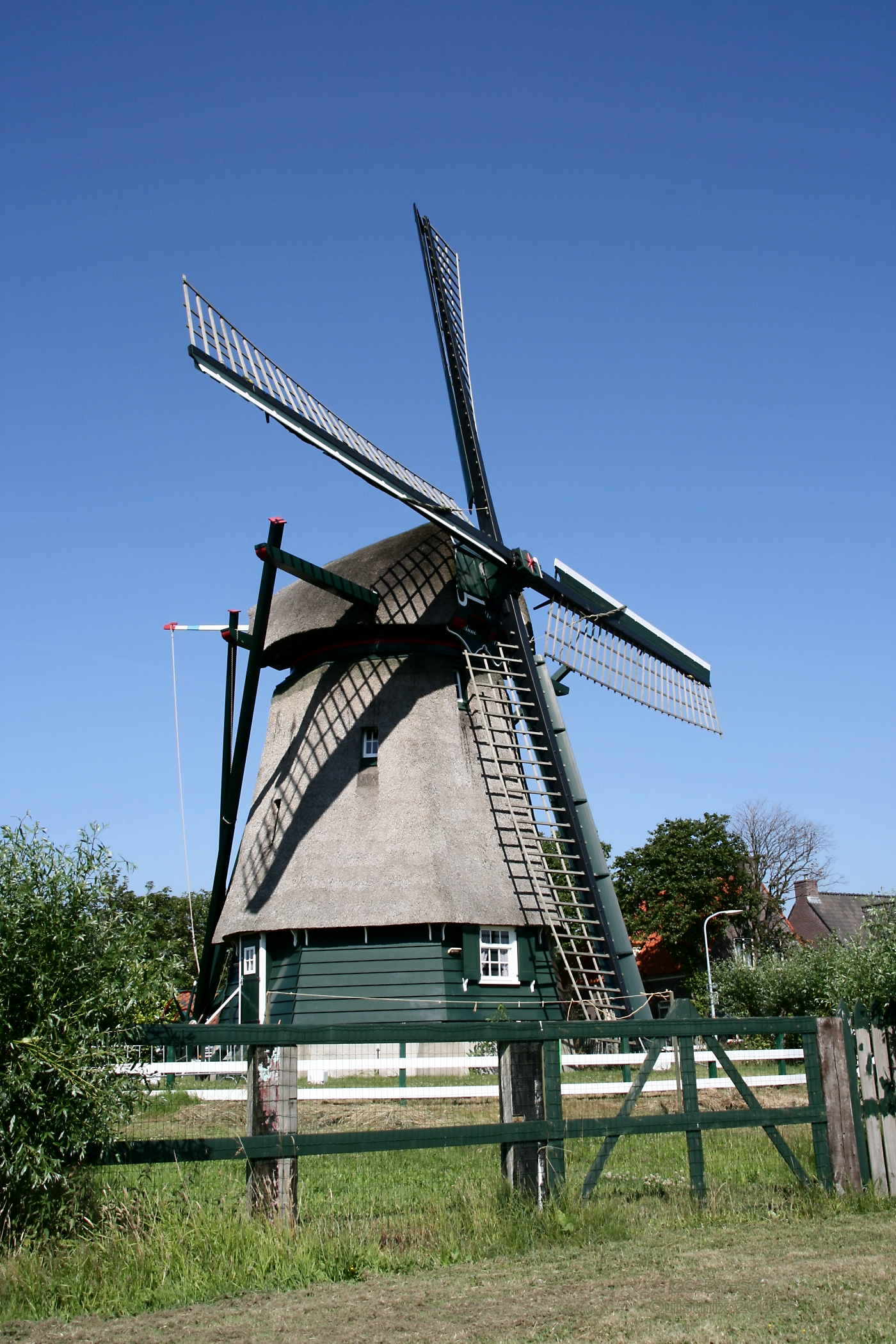
- Windmill De Veer

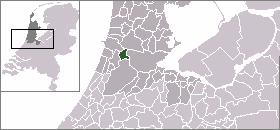

- Penningsveer in the former municipality of Haarlemmerliede en Spaarnwoude
- Coordinates: 52°23′34″N 4°40′34″E
- Country: Netherlands
- Province: North Holland
- Municipality: Haarlemmermeer
- Time zone: UTC+1 (CET)
  - Summer (DST): UTC+2 (CEST)

Penningsveer is a town in the Dutch province of North Holland. It is a part of the municipality of Haarlemmermeer and lies about 3 km (1.9 mi) east of Haarlem. The town is named after the ferry (Dutch:veer) that (for a penny) used to take travellers across the Liede. Travellers over land on their way to Amsterdam would pass through Spaarnwoude before reaching Halfweg. That route became obsolete when the Haarlemmertrekvaart was dug in 1631.
