= Schalkwijk, Haarlem =

Borough of Haarlem, Netherlands

Schalkwijk is the largest borough of Haarlem, Netherlands. It has about 30.000 inhabitants, and covers about 25% of the municipality of Haarlem.

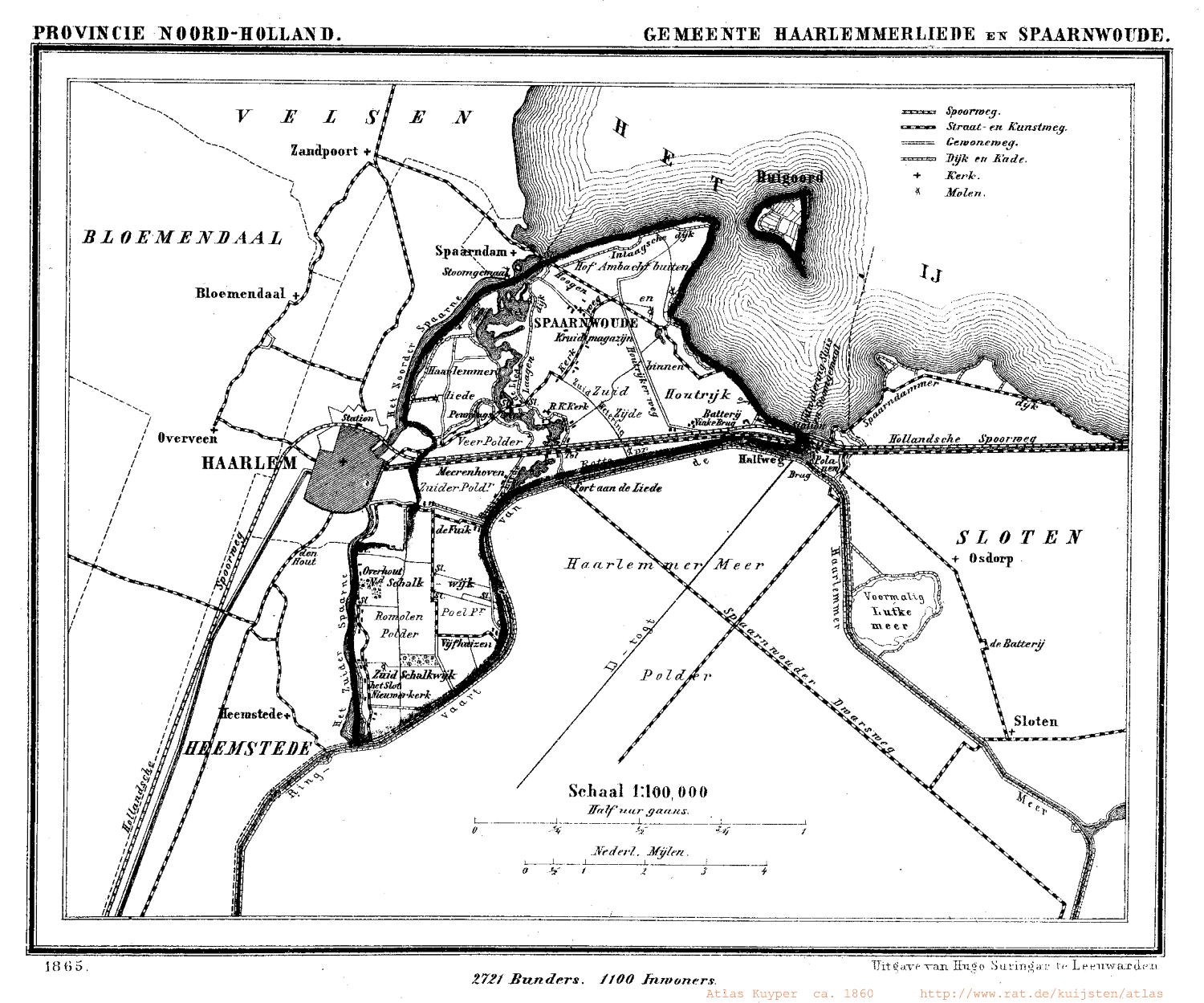
1868 map of Haarlemmerliede and Spaarnwoude, showing North and South Schalkwijk in the southwest of the municipality.

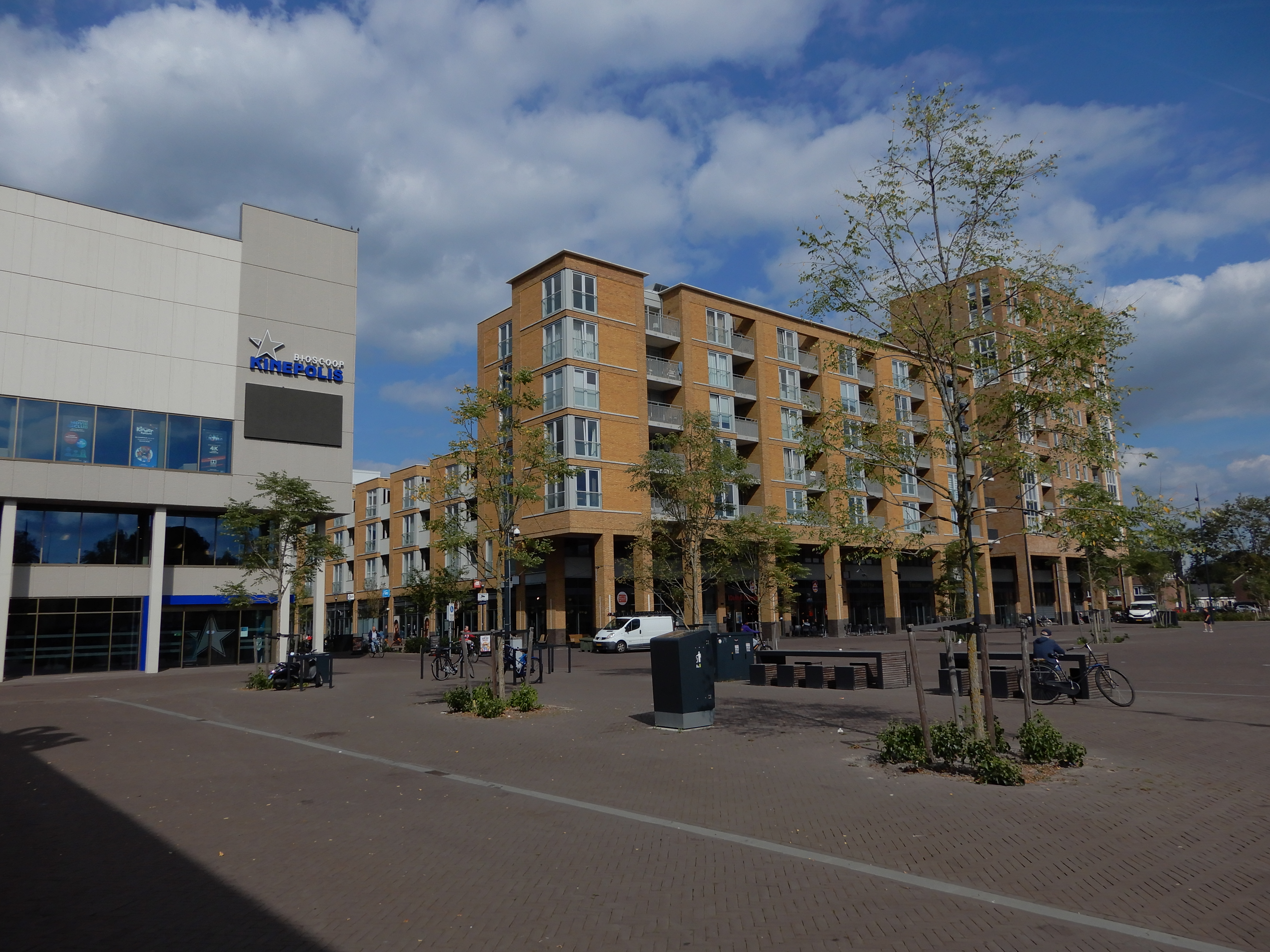
Shopping mall Schalkwijk. The cinema and residential space, built in 2021

Until 1963, Schalkwijk was a part of the municipality of Haarlemmerliede en Spaarnwoude. It consisted of two hamlets, North Schalkwijk and South Schalkwijk. The area is now covered by the residential area Schalkwijk that was mostly built in the 1960s.

Schalkwijk has a shopping mall, geographically in the center of the borough. It has some 90+ stores, ranging from supermakets to a cinema, multiple hair-dressers/barbers. It is always lively and has recently been rebuilt partially adding retail and residential space.

General sources: Mall Schalkwijk site Schalkwijk page in Dutch
