= Haarlemmerliede =

Coordinates: 52°23′N 4°41′E

- Coat of arms

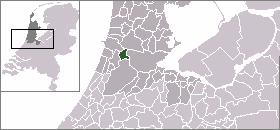

- The village (dark red) and the statistical district (light green) of Haarlemmerliede in the former municipality of Haarlemmerliede en Spaarnwoude.
- Country: Netherlands
- Province: North Holland
- Municipality: Haarlemmermeer

Haarlemmerliede is a small village in the Dutch province of North Holland. It is a part of the municipality of Haarlemmermeer and lies about 4 km (2.5 mi) east of Haarlem.

Haarlemmerliede was a separate municipality between 1817 and 1857, when it merged with Spaarnwoude. The resulting municipality of Haarlemmerliede en Spaarnwoude was later merged with Haarlemmermeer, in 2019.

The statistical area "Haarlemmerliede", which also can include the surrounding countryside, has a population of around 300.

== Notable residents ==
- Cornélie Huygens (1848 - 1902), writer, social democrat and feminist, was born in Haarlemmerliede.
