= Cornélie Huygens =

Dutch writer, social democrat and feminist

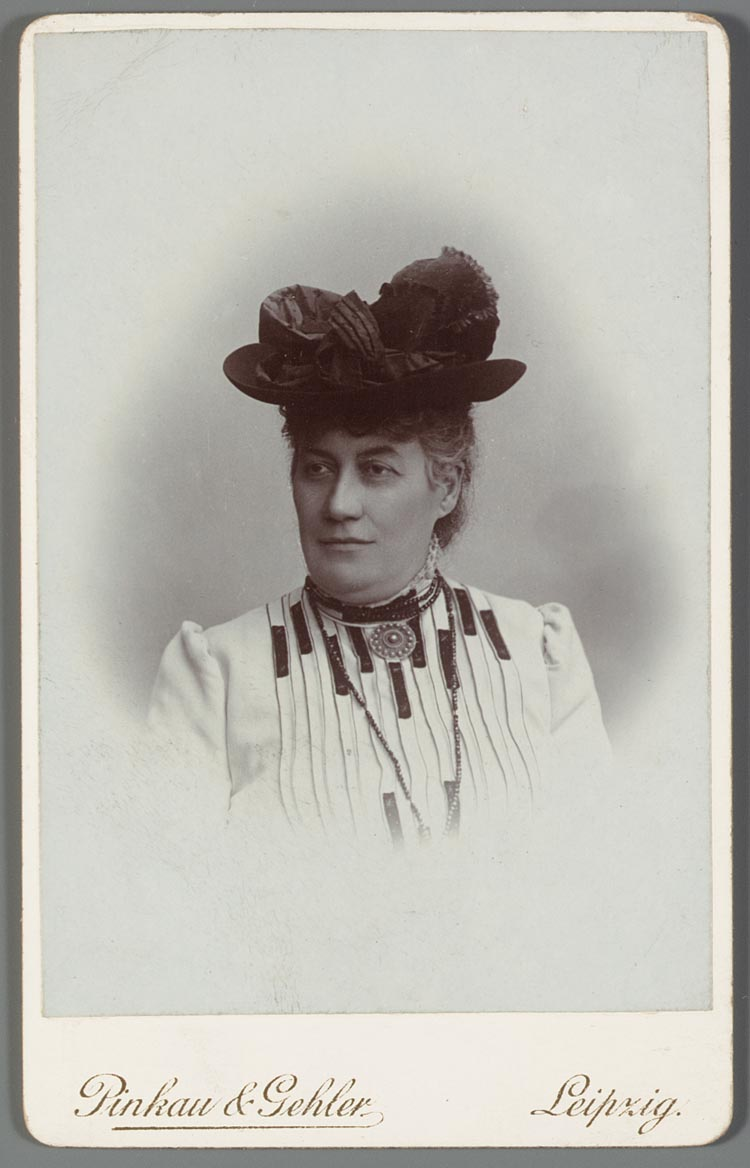
- Born: 13 June 1848; Haarlemmerliede, Netherlands
- Died: 31 October 1902 (aged 54); Amsterdam, Netherlands
- Occupation: Writer
- Spouse: Ignazius Bahlmann (m. 1902)

Cornélie Lydie Huygens (13 June 1848 – 31 October 1902) was a Dutch writer, social democrat and feminist.

== Biography ==
Huygens was born on 13 June 1848 in Haarlemmerliede. She was the daughter of Gerard William Otto Huygens and Cornelia Adelaide Henriette Elias (1824–1848) and married the German businessman Ignatius Bernardus Maria Bahlmann (1852–1934) in 1902. Her mother died after her birth and she was raised by her paternal aunt Jeanne Marie Huygens, a friend of the feminist Mina Kruseman. Huygens became known early for her feminist articles and made her debut as a novelist in 1877. In 1896, she joined the newly founded Social Democratic Workers' Party (SDAP) as its first female member and the first woman in the Netherlands to be a member of a political party, becoming known as the "Red Lady". Cornélie Huygens was an active socialist ideologist and participator in the political debate, and by her work for women's suffrage, she made the work for women's rights, which in the Netherlands had previously been an issue for upper class women, a part of the socialist movement for workers' rights.

Despite her principled opposition against the institution of marriage, she married on 2 October 1902, at the age of 54, to the Amsterdam-born German businessman Ignazius Bahlmann, who had translated her novel Barthold Meryan into German. Apparently very unhappy in her marriage, she drowned herself within a month after this wedding in a pond in the Vondelpark. She died on 31 October 1902 in Amsterdam.
