= Haarlemmerliede en Spaarnwoude =

- Former municipality
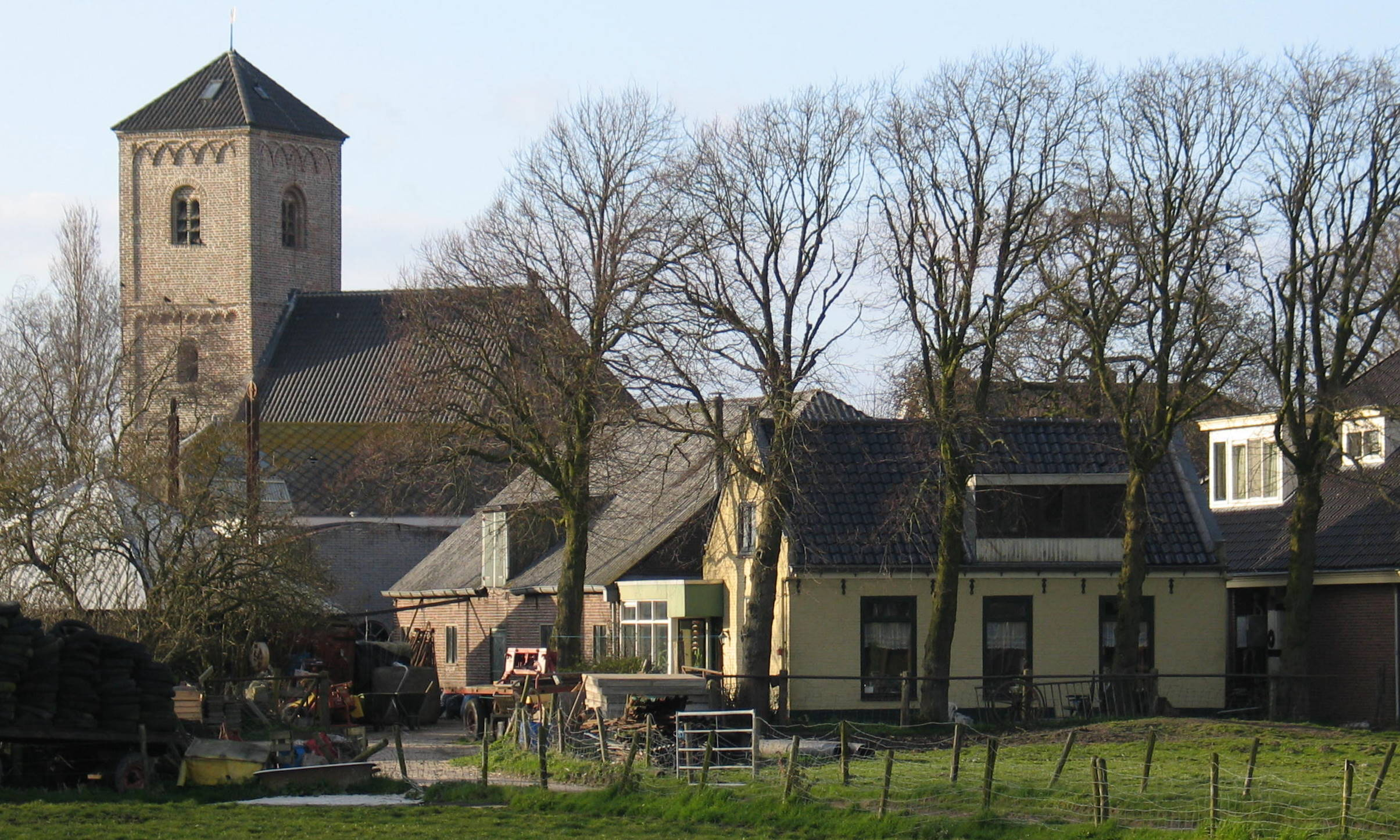
- Spaarnwoude town centre

- Flag Coat of arms

- Location in North Holland
- Coordinates: 52°23′N 4°45′E
- Country: Netherlands
- Province: North Holland
- Established: 8 September 1857
- Disestablished: 1 January 2019

Area
  - Total: 21.19 km^{2} (8.18 sq mi)
  - Land: 19.24 km^{2} (7.43 sq mi)
  - Water: 1.95 km^{2} (0.75 sq mi)
- Elevation: 0 m (0 ft)

Population (January 2021)
  - Total: data missing
- Time zone: UTC+1 (CET)
  - Summer (DST): UTC+2 (CEST)
- Postcode: 1165, 2064–2065
- Area code: 020
- Website: www.haarlemmerliede.nl

Haarlemmerliede en Spaarnwoude (Dutch pronunciation: [ˌɦaːrlɛmərˈlidə ʔɛn spaːr(ə)nˈʋʌudə]) is a former municipality in the Netherlands, located in the province of North Holland. It had a population of 5,760 in August 2017. On 1 January 2019, it merged with the municipality of Haarlemmermeer.

The municipality was bordered by Zaanstad to the north, Amsterdam to the east, Haarlemmermeer to the south, Haarlem to the west and Velsen to the northwest.

== Population centres ==
The municipality of Haarlemmerliede en Spaarnwoude consisted of the following towns and villages: Haarlemmerliede, Halfweg, Penningsveer, Spaarndam (partly), Spaarnwoude, Vinkebrug.

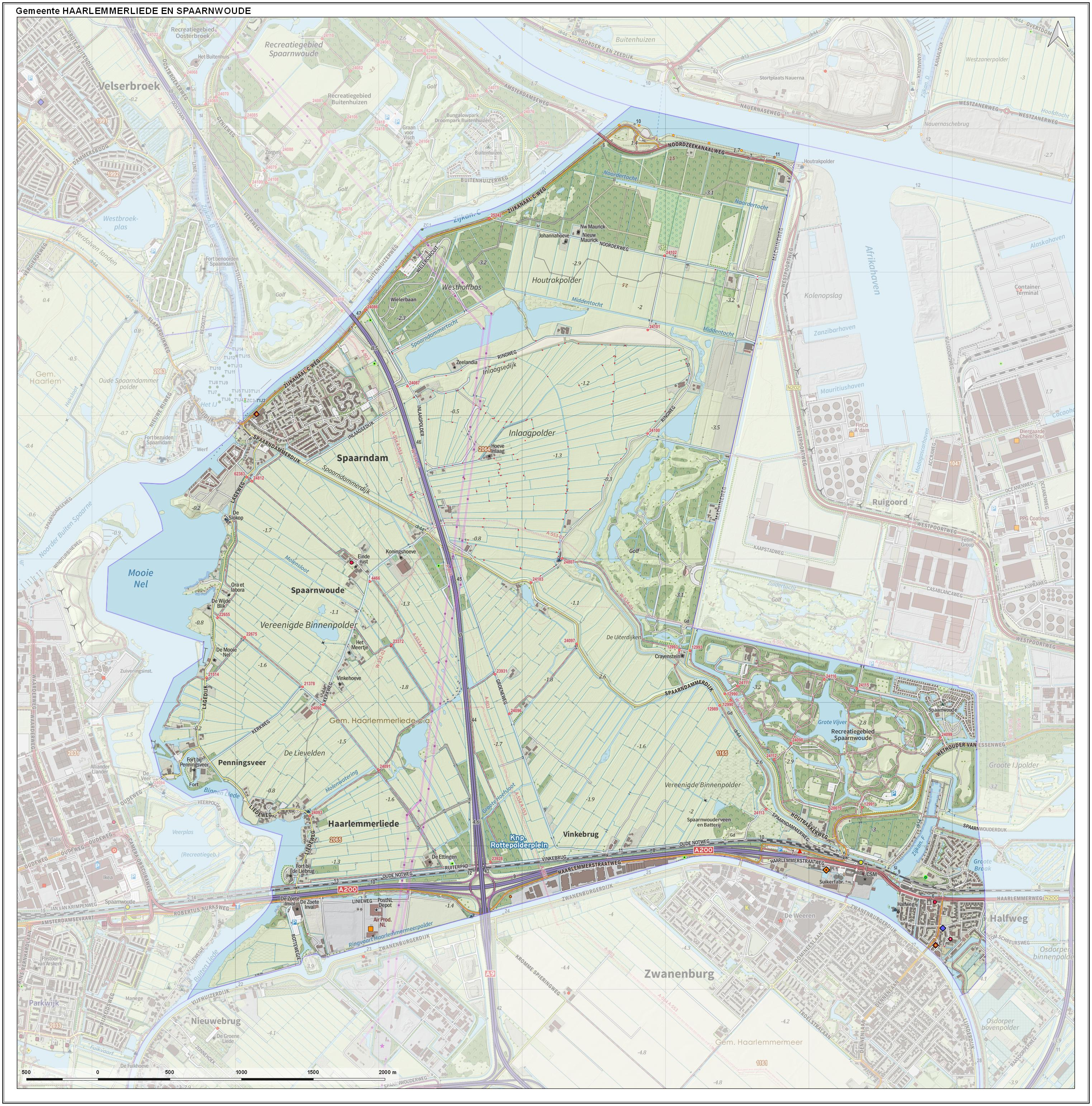
Map of municipality of Haarlemmerliede en Spaarnwoude, June 2015

== History ==
The municipality was formed on 8 September 1857, through the merger of the former municipalities of Haarlemmerliede and Spaarnwoude.

On 22 September 1863, Houtrijk en Polanen and Zuidschalkwijk were added to the municipality, of which Zuidschalkwijk was subsequently annexed by the city of Haarlem.

During the construction of the North Sea Canal (completed 1867), large portions of the IJ Bay were enclosed with dikes and made into polders, thereby enlarging the area of the municipality significantly. However, Haarlemmerliede en Spaarnwoude also lost large areas to the cities of Haarlem and Amsterdam in 1927, 1963, and 1970.

On 1 January 2019, the municipality of Haarlemmerliede en Spaarnwoude was abolished and merged with the municipality of Haarlemmermeer.

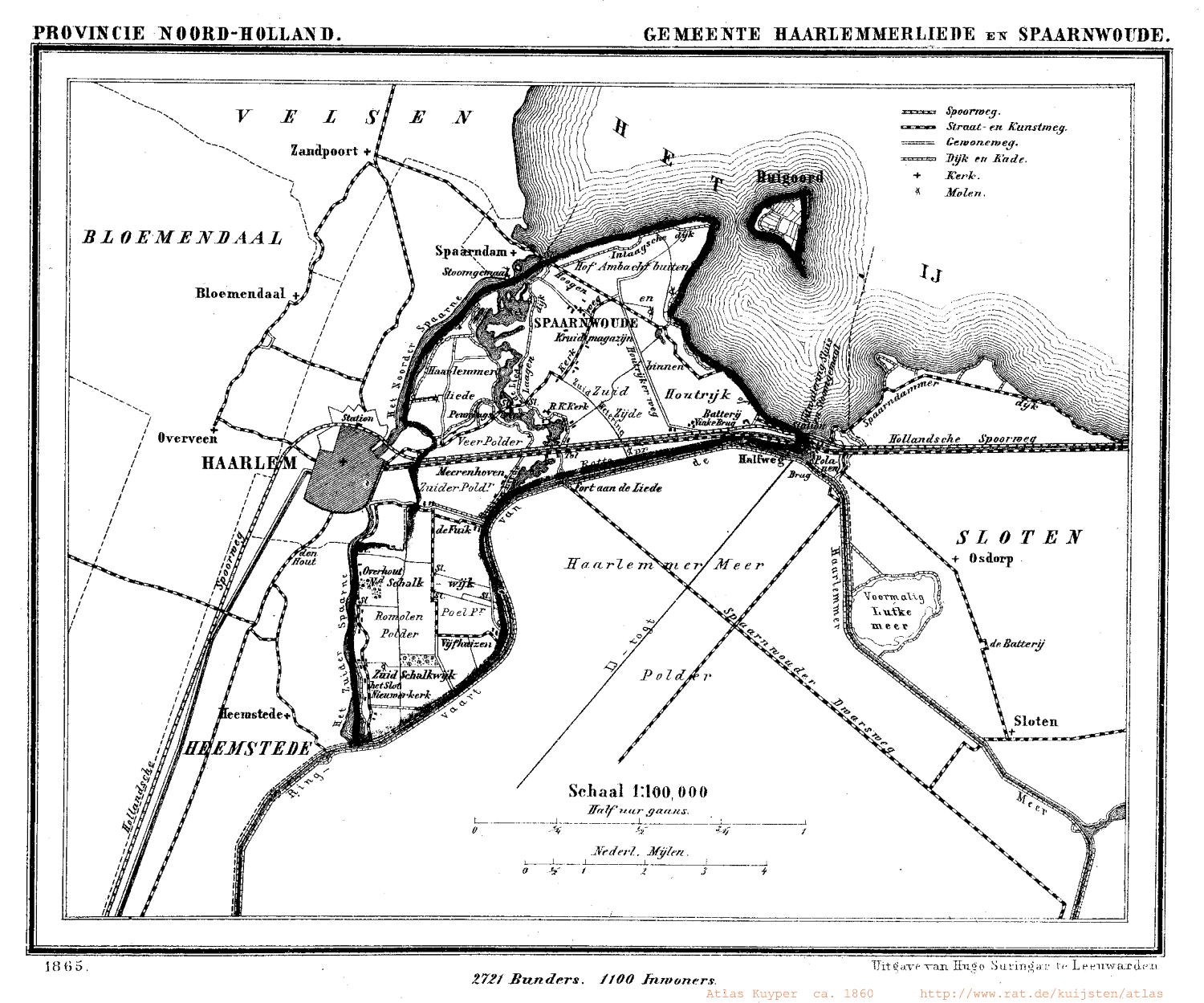
Haarlemmerliede en Spaarnwoude in 1865.

== Local government ==
The municipal council of Haarlemmerliede en Spaarnwoude consisted of 11 seats, which at the final local election in 2014 were divided as follows:

- CDA – 4 seats
- D66 – 3 seats
- VVD – 2 seats
- GL – 1 seat
- PvdA – 1 seat

The last mayor was Pieter Heiliegers (VVD).

== Twinning ==
Haarlemmerliede en Spaarnwoude is twinned with Saxilby in Lincolnshire, UK.
