= Veerplas =

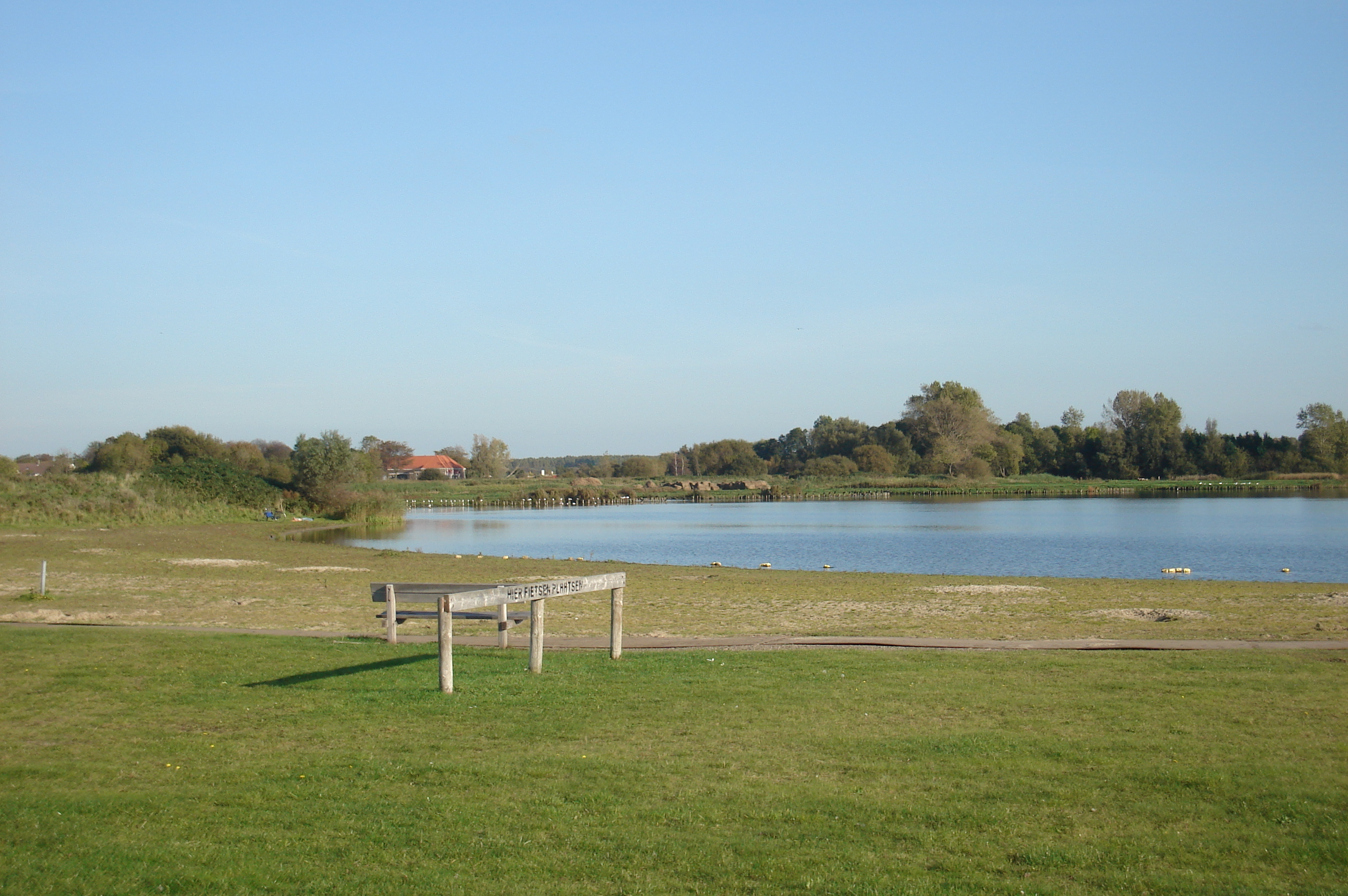
- The lake from the west with the beach in foreground

- Location within North Holland
- Location: Haarlem, Netherlands
- Coordinates: 52°23.2′N 4°40.6′E
- Type: artificial lake
- Basin countries: Netherlands

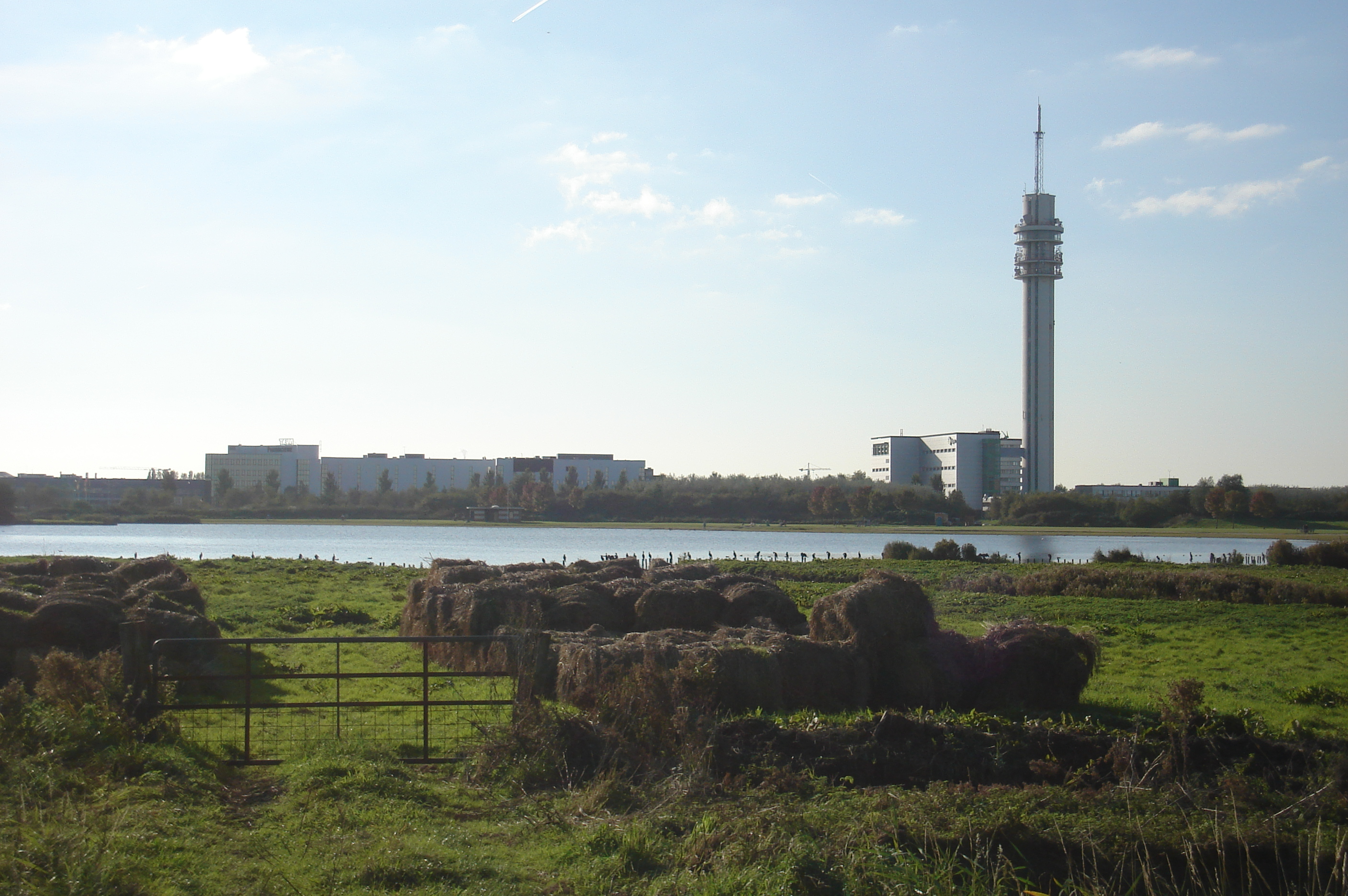
Veerplas lake from the east with the birds'shore in foreground and telecom tower in background

Veerplas (Dutch pronunciation: [veːrˈplɑs]) is an artificial lake directly east of the Dutch city of Haarlem. It was dug in 1994, mainly for recreation purposes and forms part of the Spaarnwoude recreational area.

The lake measures 450 by 400 metres. The southern shore is formed by a constructed wetland used for water purification. Large numbers of waterfowl may be found here and along the swampy eastern shore during the winter season (e.g. greylag geese, wigeons, common goldeneyes). The local angling club has released carps into the lake. A sandy beach measuring some 300 m was created at the western shore. An area sufficiently shallow to accommodate safe swimming by inexperienced bathers is cordoned off. Furthermore, a grassy sunbathing area sporting a public toilet adjoins the lake, as well as a children's adventure playground. The lake is only a short walking distance from Haarlem Spaarnwoude railway station and relatively close to the A200 and A9 motorways. This favourable location has helped to make it a popular area for organising mid to large-scale events. Thus, 2006 saw the Circus Herman Renz pitch its tent alongside the lake.

== Future development of the Veerplas area ==
The municipality of Haarlem's Spoorzone masterplan provides for the construction of 260 houses along the Veerplas's western shore. The construction of a recreation center accommodating sports activities, nature education and catering is also planned.
