= Zuidschalkwijk =

Suburban hamlet in Haarlem, Netherlands

Coordinates: 52°20′45″N 4°38′30″E

Zuidschalkwijk was a hamlet in the northwestern Netherlands. It has been annexed by the city of Haarlem and is located about 4 km south of the city centre.

Zuidschalkwijk was a separate municipality between 1817 and 1863, when it was merged with Haarlemmerliede en Spaarnwoude. On October 1, 1963, Zuidschalkwijk was transferred to Haarlem and became part of the Schalkwijk neighbourhood.
