= Music gym =

A music gym is membership-based club or cooperative community where musicians (and other artists) share common resources in a shared facility. Such resources are related to music production, music rehearsal, movie production, art galleries, and networking tools.

The music gym concept and name were created and coined in 2000 in Boston, Massachusetts by Ryan McVinney, where he and business partner Robert Edward along with a group of musicians and artists converted an old circuit-board factory in a rundown area of Allston into a shared musical facility for a relatively large group of local musicians and artists . McVinney and others have helped spread the concept from Boston to Austin, Texas, New York City, Canada, England, Lima Peru, San Francisco, Los Angeles and other various locations across the world. Some music gyms operate as for-profit businesses, while some operate as private, non-incorporated clubs run by smaller groups of musicians.
