= Dance Valley =

Music festival in Velsen-Zuid, Netherlands

Coordinates: 52.4308288°N 4.6132296°E

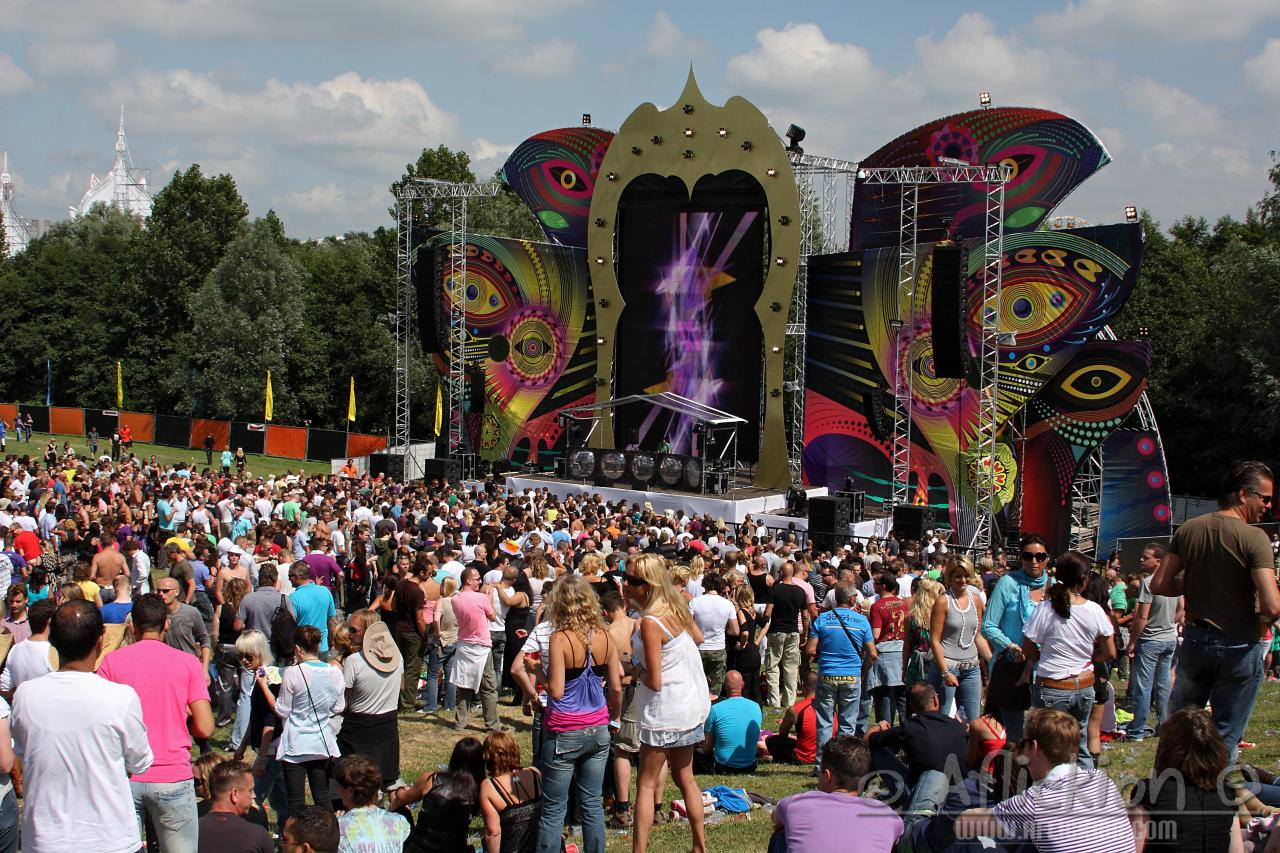
- Dance Valley festival, 2009
- Genre: Electronic music,
- Locations: Spaarnwoude, Netherlands
- Years active: 1995-present
- Attendance: 90,000+
- Website: Official Dance Valley site

Dance Valley ("The Woodstock of Dance") is an annual dance music festival organised by United Dance Company (UDC) in the summer in Spaarnwoude, Netherlands. The first edition was in 1995 when 8,000 people attended (and in 2001 90,000 visitors). Dance Valley grew rapidly, both in duration and number of visitors.

== History ==
The idea for a dance music festival in daylight was a revolutionary concept in the early nineties and it took the organizers several years before they made it a reality. After trying to get funding via the largest concert organizer in The Netherlands Mojo (now LiveNation Netherlands), they raised the money independently and organised their first festival in 1995.

2005 was the first time the event lasted 3 days in the weekend with camping available for the concertgoers at the campsite. It rained. A record-breaking 53,000 people attended that year. There were some big changes to the festival in 2006. Traditionally held on the first weekend of August, due to colliding with another festival UDC (the Dance Valley management company) brought the festival forward two weeks to 14–16 July. While this had little effect in terms of sales it did affect the last two hours of the festival when sunlight was still visible on the horizon. This in turn affected the use of lighting with the lasers not being switched on until later. Dance Valley also hosted BMX, skate boarding and motorcycle competitions sponsored by LG. The back field in which HQ resided was not used; instead a large tent towards the entrance was specially erected for the harder side of dance.

The 2007 event was held on July 14. It was no longer a 3-day event as the UDC returned to its roots and reopened the HQ field, much to the delight of clubbers.

In 2009, the fifteenth edition took place on July 11 from 11:00 until 23:00.

In 2010, the sixteenth edition took place on August 7 from 10:00 until 23:00.

In 2011, the seventeenth edition took place on August 6 from 12:00 until 23:00.

In 2012, the eighteenth edition took place on August 4 from 12:00 until 23:00.

== Controversy ==
In 2001 the festival attracted 90.000 visitors. While the terrain was large enough for this crowd, the access roads to get to and from the festival were not. When the festival ended buses and other transport were overwhelmed by the number of visitors. To complicate matters further, a rainstorm erupted and drenched stranded party goers on their way home resulting in several cases of hypothermia.

== DJs ==
Many famous and less famous DJs have played music at Dance Valley over time, with big names such as Carl Cox, Derrick May, Paul van Dyk, Tiësto, Armin van Buuren, Richie Hawtin, Ricardo Villalobos, Paul Oakenfold, Ferry Corsten and Yoji Biomehanika all having made appearances.

== Music ==
While Dance Valley is a pure dance-music event, it caters to a wide audience by not limiting itself to a specific style though its heart is (as with most Dutch events), in trance. The biggest name DJs on the main stage tend to be trance DJs. In 2006, Armin Van Buuren, Ferry Corsten, Marco V, Hardwell and Simon Patterson (part of the duo Dogzilla) were the main draws. With the main stage reserved for the big names in mainstream dance music, up to a dozen secondary, smaller stages are dedicated to styles such as electro, Eurodance, hardstyle and experimental.

== See also ==
- List of electronic music festivals
