= Liede =

River in the Netherlands

Coordinates: 52.3861°N 4.6869°E

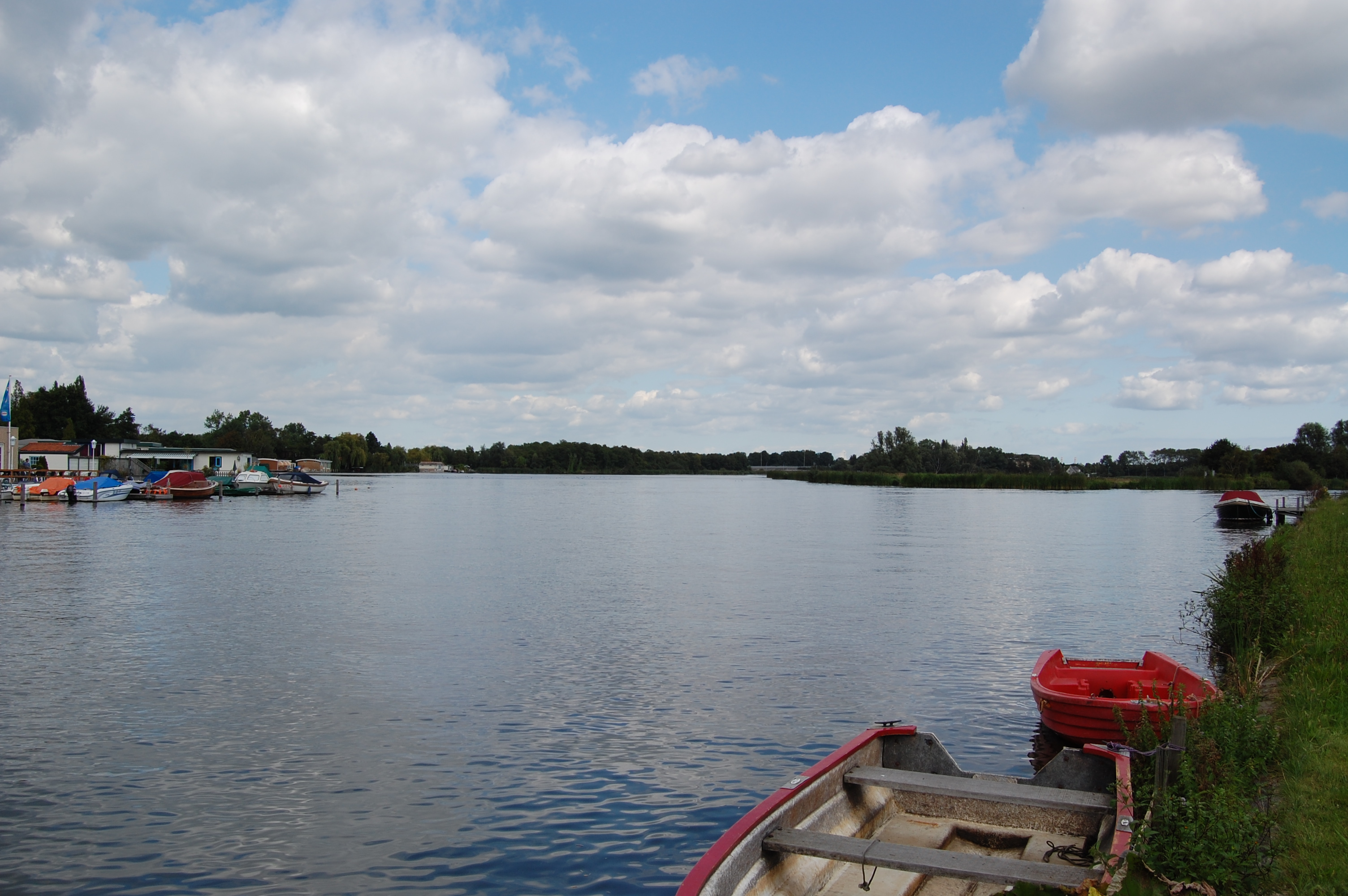
Junction of the Ringvaart with the Liede, looking North.

The Liede is a little river that used to connect Haarlem Lake with the Spaarne, just south of Spaarndam, at a small lake called the Mooie Nel.

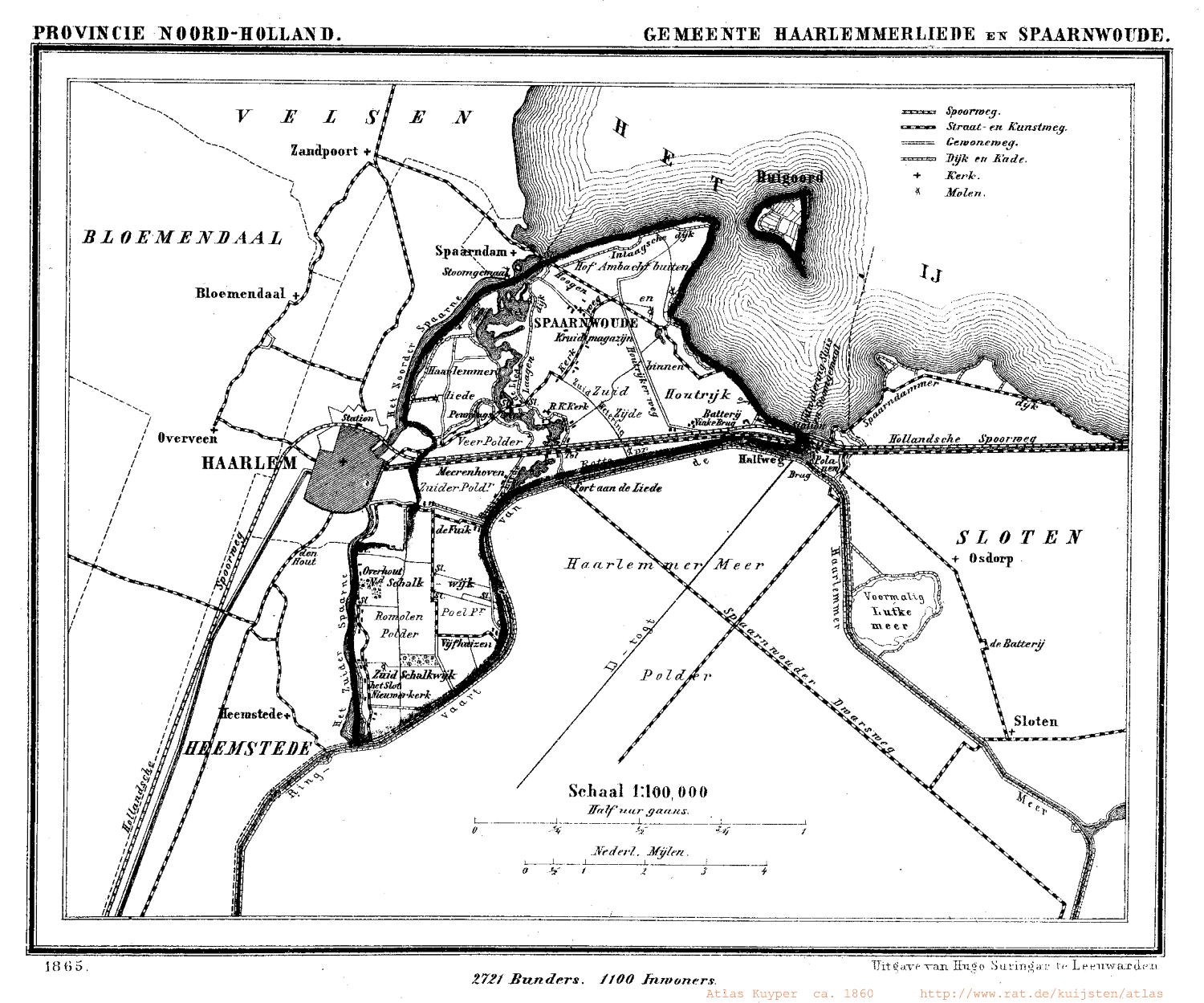
Old map showing the Liede in the middle

After the lake was pumped dry in 1852, the Liede became a side-river of the Ringvaart. The Liede and Mooie Nel are nowadays important for recreational boat sailing. There is also an ice-skating club called De Liede.
