= Spaarnwoude =

- Village
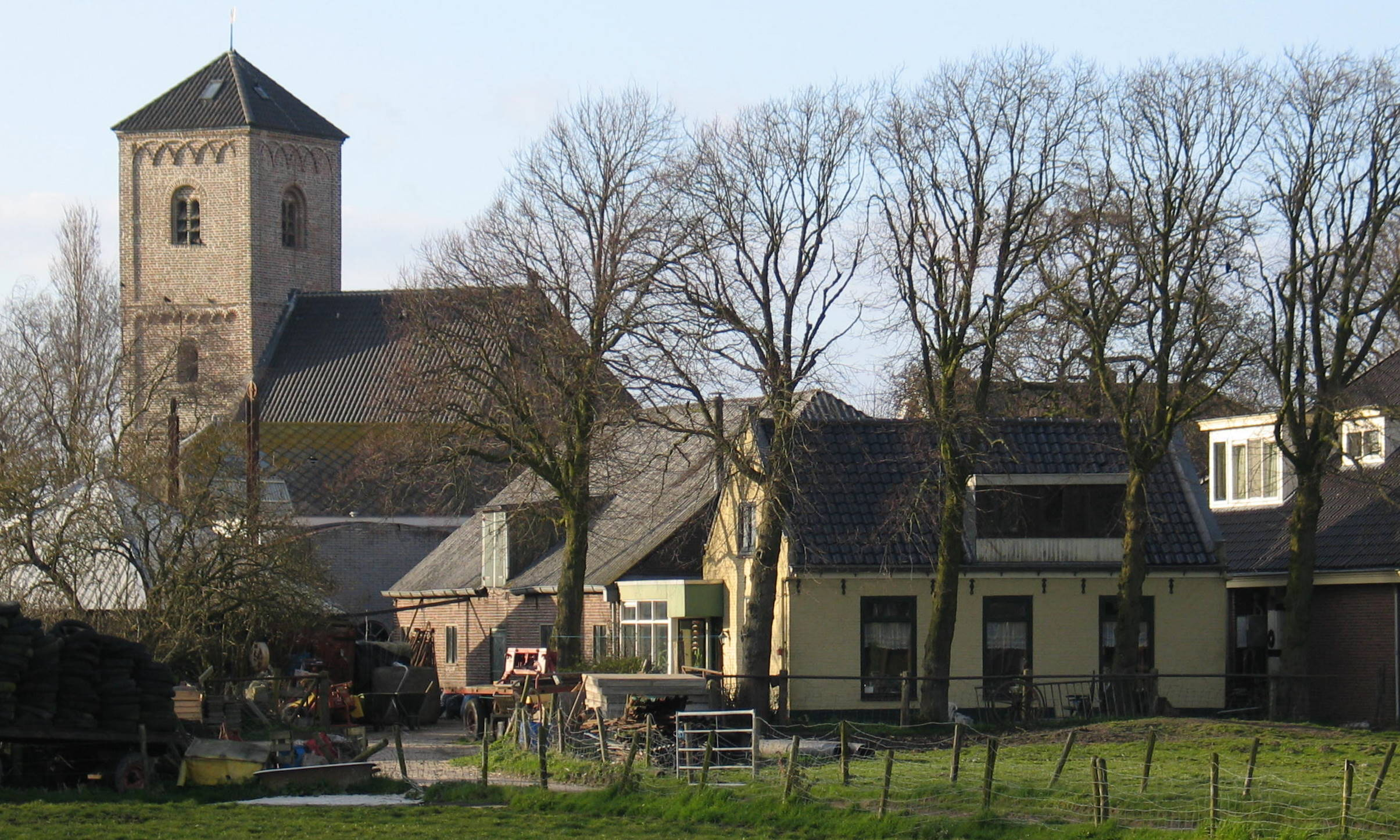
- Spaarnwoude village

- Coat of arms

- Location in the Netherlands Location in the province of North Holland in the Netherlands
- Coordinates: 52°24′N 4°42′E
- Country: Netherlands
- Province: North Holland
- Municipality: Haarlemmermeer

Area
  - Total: 0.76 km^{2} (0.29 sq mi)
- Elevation: −0.5 m (−1.6 ft)

Population (2021)
  - Total: 100
  - Density: 130/km^{2} (340/sq mi)
- Time zone: UTC+1 (CET)
  - Summer (DST): UTC+2 (CEST)
- Postal code: 2064
- Dialing code: 023

Spaarnwoude is a village in the Dutch province of North Holland. It is a part of the municipality of Haarlemmermeer and lies about 5 km (3.1 mi) northeast of Haarlem.

== Overview ==
The village was first mentioned in the first half of the 11th century as Spirnerewalt, and means "forest along the Spaarne river".

The former Dutch Reformed church dates from 1764, but has a tower from the 13th century. It was decommissioned in 1880, but is still used for cultural activities.

North of Spaarnwoude lies the Spaarnwoude recreation area, which is located in the municipalities of Velsen and Haarlemmermeer.

There is a railway station, Haarlem Spaarnwoude, which lies southwest of the village. An IKEA shop is nearby, on the north side. To the east of IKEA is the Veerplas.

Spaarnwoude was home to 443 people in 1840. It was a separate municipality until 1857, when it merged with Haarlemmerliede. The resulting municipality of Haarlemmerliede en Spaarnwoude was later merged with Haarlemmermeer, in 2019.

== Gallery ==
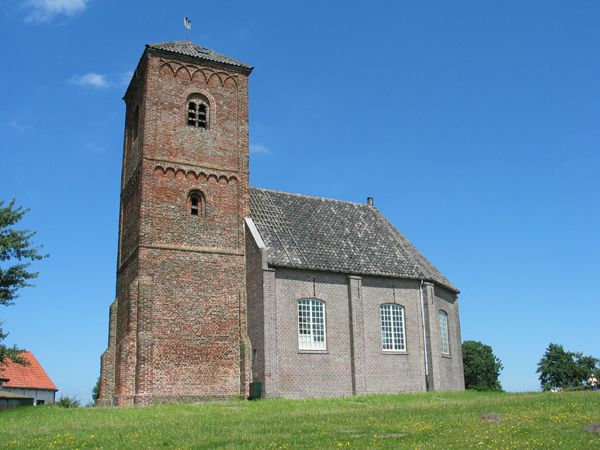
The church of Spaarnwoude

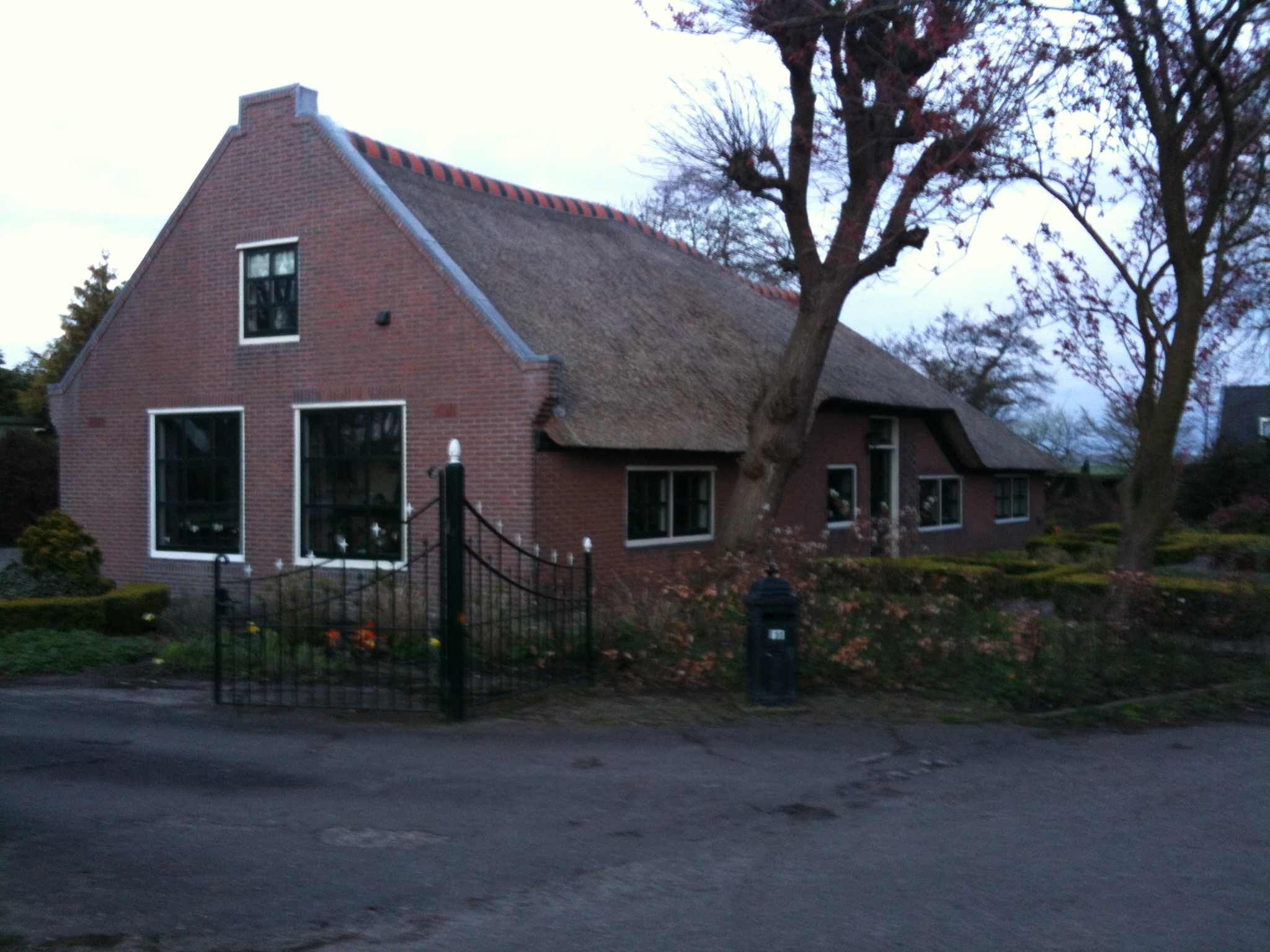
Farm in Spaarnwoude

== See also ==
- Dance Valley
