= 2023 Dutch water board elections =

Dutch water board election

| ← 2019 | 15 March 2023 | 2027 → |
- 518 of the 602 (Note: Each water board holds two seats for agricultural and nature reserve stakeholders respectively, which are not elected) seats in the water boards
- Turnout: 53.61
| Party | Vote % | Seats | +/– |
|---|---|---|---|
| Farmer–Citizen Movement | 19.89% | 118 | New |
| Water Natuurlijk | 15.95% | 97 | +6 |
| People's Party for Freedom and Democracy | 10.27% | 55 | −15 |
| Labour Party | 9.39% | 50 | +1 |
| Party for the Animals | 7.47% | 37 | +20 |
| Christian Democratic Appeal | 7.26% | 36 | −24 |
| General Water Board Party | 5.25% | 21 | −2 |
| Christian Union | 3.07% | 14 | −1 |
| 50PLUS | 3.03% | 10 | −22 |
| Belang van Nederland | 2.54% | 5 | New |
| Reformed Political Party | 2.33% | 13 | +4 |
| JA21 | 1.32% | 5 | New |
| Christian Union–SGP | 1.16% | 6 | −2 |
| Ondernemend Water | 0.51% | 1 | New |
| Groningers' Interests | 0.41% | 3 | New |
| The Greens | 0.39% | 1 | −1 |
| Others | 9.46% | 46 | −11 |
This lists parties that won seats. See the complete results below.

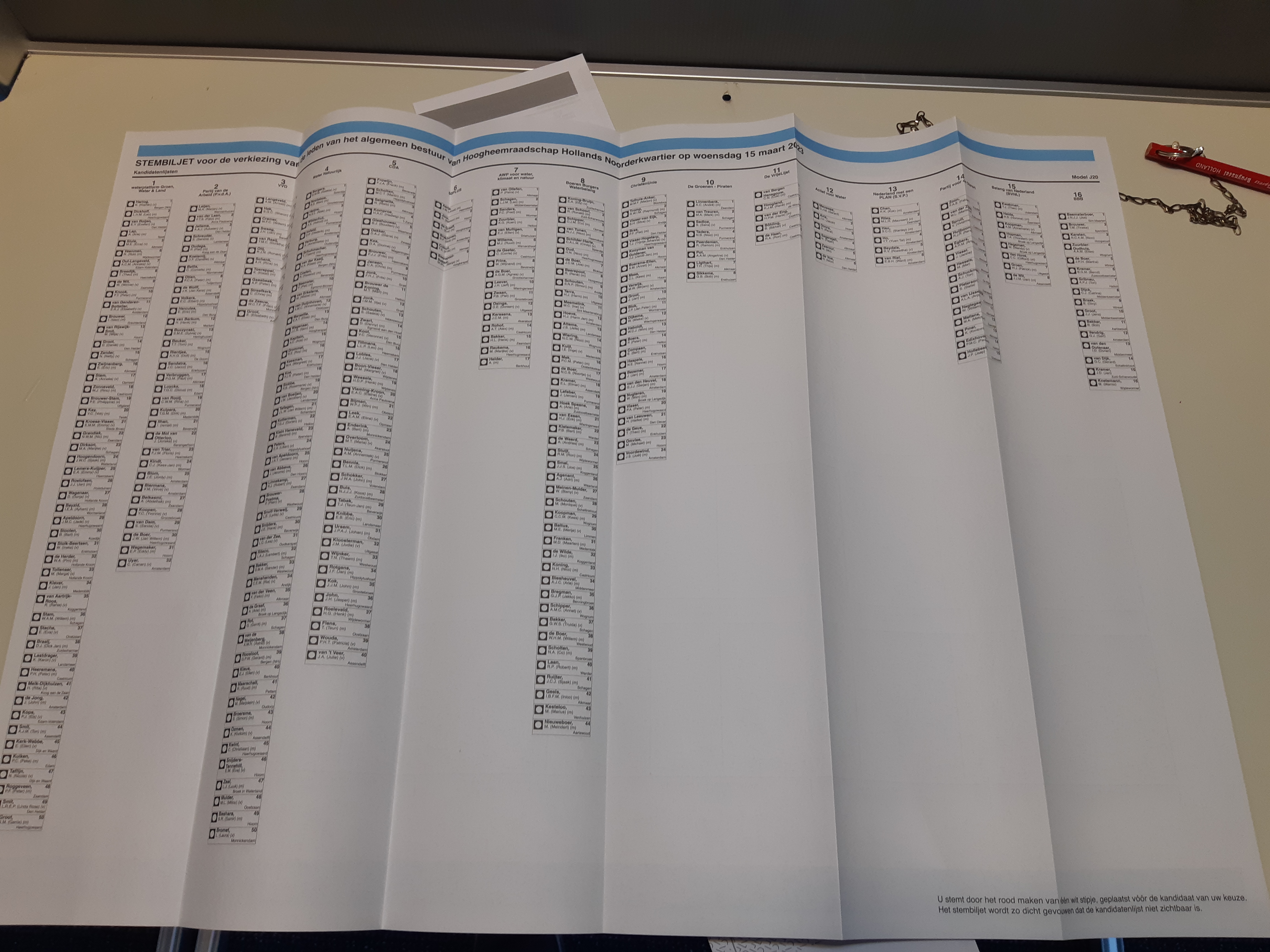
Voting form for the board of the Hoogheemraadschap Hollands Noorderkwartier.

Water board elections were held in the European Netherlands on 15 March 2023 to elect 518 of the 602 resident members of the country's water boards.

As in the provincial elections held on the same day, the Farmer–Citizen Movement became the largest party by vote share nationally and in 14 of the 21 water boards. Water Natuurlijk, which was endorsed by GroenLinks, Democrats 66 and Volt Netherlands fell to second place nationally but remained the largest party by vote share in four water boards. The Labour Party and local Water Board Party Hollandse Delta were also each largest by vote share in one water board.

These elections also saw a large increase in the number of elected officials to the water boards, due to a new bill which was passed by the Senate which heavily reduced the number of seats which went to stakeholders. The total number of seats in each water board was not affected by this, instead the seats that were formerly held by stakeholders are now elected during the water board elections.

== Results ==
=== National ===
| Party or alliance | | Votes | % | +/– | Seats | +/– |
|---|---|---|---|---|---|---|
| Farmer–Citizen Movement | | 1,516,891 | 19.89 | New | 118 | New |
| WN | Water Natuurlijk | 1,171,724 | 15.36 | –1.90 | 91 | +6 |
| WN | Water, Wonen en Natuur (Note: Water Natuurlijk affiliate party in Waterschap Zuiderzeeland) | 44,626 | 0.59 | –0.15 | 6 | 0 |
| WN | Total | 1,216,350 | 15.95 | –2.05 | 97 | +6 |
| People's Party for Freedom and Democracy | | 783,219 | 10.27 | –3.60 | 55 | –15 |
| Labour Party | | 716,326 | 9.39 | –1.90 | 50 | +1 |
| Party for the Animals | | 569,563 | 7.47 | +2.70 | 37 | +20 |
| Christian Democratic Appeal | | 553,573 | 7.26 | –5.45 | 36 | −24 |
| General Water Board Party | | 400,402 | 5.25 | –1.04 | 21 | –2 |
| Christian Union | | 234,418 | 3.07 | –1.38 | 14 | −1 |
| 50PLUS | | 230,999 | 3.03 | –4.51 | 10 | –22 |
| Belang van Nederland | | 194,014 | 2.54 | New | 5 | New |
| Reformed Political Party | | 177,537 | 2.33 | –0.10 | 13 | +4 |
| JA21 | | 100,500 | 1.32 | New | 5 | New |
| Christian Union – Reformed Political Party | | 88,498 | 1.16 | –0.38 | 6 | –2 |
| Ondernemend Water | | 39,023 | 0.51 | New | 1 | New |
| Groningers' Interests | | 31,235 | 0.41 | New | 3 | New |
| The Greens | | 29,431 | 0.39 | –0.18 | 1 | –1 |
| Elderly Appeal - Heart for Water | | 12,740 | 0.17 | –0.14 | 0 | –1 |
| GOLD | | 10,010 | 0.13 | New | 0 | New |
| Others (Note: Parties that only participated in a single water board) | | 721,402 | 9.46 | –6.13 | 46 | −11 |
| Total | | 7,626,131 | 100.00 | – | 518 | +76 |
| Valid votes | | 7,626,131 | 98.57 | | | |
| Invalid votes | | 25,752 | 0.33 | | | |
| Blank votes | | 85,059 | 1.10 | | | |
| Total votes | | 7,736,942 | 100.00 | | | |
| Registered voters/turnout | | 13,759,207 | 56.23 | +4.98 | | |
Source: Kiesraad

=== By Water Board ===
| Water Board | Number of seats by party | | | | | | | | | | | | | | |
| Water Board | BBB | WN | VVD | PvdA | PvdD | CDA | AWP | CU | SGP | 50+ | BVNL | JA21 | GB | Other | Total |
|---|---|---|---|---|---|---|---|---|---|---|---|---|---|---|---|
| Noorderzijlvest | 4 | 6 | 1 | 3 | - | 1 | - | 1 | - | 0 | 0 | - | 1 | 2 (Note: Betaalbaar Water: 1, Student & Water: 1) | 19 |
| Fryslân | 7 | 4 | 1 | 2 | 1 | 2 | 0 | 1 | - | - | 1 | - | - | 2 (Note: Fryske Nasjonale Partij) | 21 |
| Hunze en Aa's | 6 | 5 | 1 | 3 | - | 1 | 0 | 1 | - | 0 | 0 | - | 2 | 0 | 19 |
| Drents Overijsselse Delta | 9 | 5 | 2 | - | 2 | 2 | 0 | 2 | 1 | 0 | 0 | - | - | 2 (Note: Gemeentebelangen Drenthe-Overijssel) | 25 |
| Vechtstromen | 9 | 7 | 2 | - | - | 3 | 1 | 1 | 0 | 0 | 0 | - | - | 0 | 23 |
| Zuiderzeeland | 6 | 6 (Note: Water Natuurlijk is represented in Zuiderzeeland by Water, Wonen en Natuur.) | 2 | - | - | 1 | 2 | 2 (Note: Joint list CU/SGP) | | 1 | 1 | - | - | - | 21 |
| Vallei en Veluwe | 6 | 3 | 2 | 2 | 1 | 2 | 2 | 3 | 3 | 1 | 0 | - | - | 1 (Note: Lokaal Waterbeheer) | 26 |
| Rijn en IJssel | 9 | 5 | 2 | 4 | - | 3 | 0 | - | - | 0 | - | - | - | 3 (Note: Vrienden van de Berkel: 2, Ondernemend Water: 1) | 26 |
| De Stichtse Rijnlanden | 4 | 6 | 3 | 3 | 4 | 2 | 2 | 1 | 1 | 0 | 0 | - | - | 0 | 26 |
| Amstel, Gooi en Vecht | 3 | 4 | 4 | 6 | 4 | 1 | 2 | 1 | - | 0 | 0 | - | - | 1 (Note: De Groenen) | 26 |
| Hollands Noorderkwartier | 6 | 2 | 3 | 3 | 2 | 1 | 0 | 0 | - | 1 | 1 | - | - | 7 (Note: Waterplatform Groen, Water & Land: 5, Boeren Burgers Waterbelang: 2) | 26 |
| Rijnland | 5 | 4 | 4 | 4 | 3 | 2 | 1 | 1 | | 1 | 0 | 1 | - | 0 | 26 |
| Delfland | 4 | 4 | 4 | 3 | 3 | 2 | 3 | 1 | | 0 | 1 | 1 | - | 0 | 26 |
| Schieland en de Krimpenerwaard | 3 | 6 | 4 | 3 | 3 | 1 | 2 | 2 | | 1 | 0 | 1 | - | 0 | 26 |
| Rivierenland | 6 | 5 | 2 | 3 | 2 | 3 | 1 | 1 | 2 | 0 | 0 | 1 | - | 0 | 26 |
| Hollandse Delta | 4 | 2 | 3 | 2 | 2 | 1 | 0 | 1 | 2 | 1 | 1 | 1 | - | 6 (Note: Waterschapspartij Hollandse Delta: 5, Hollandse Delta Natuurlijk: 1) | 26 |
| Scheldestromen | 7 | 2 | 2 | 2 | 1 | 2 | 1 | 1 | 4 | 0 | - | - | - | 4 (Note: Partij voor Zeeland) | 26 |
| Brabantse Delta | 5 | 3 | 4 | 2 | 2 | 2 | 1 | - | - | 1 | 0 | - | - | 6 (Note: Ons Water: 3, West-Brabant Waterbreed: 3) | 26 |
| De Dommel | 4 | 7 | 4 | 3 | 3 | 2 | 1 | - | - | 1 | 0 | - | - | 1 (Note: Werken aan Water) | 26 |
| Aa en Maas | 7 | 8 | 3 | 2 | 2 | 2 | 1 | - | - | 1 | - | - | - | 0 | 26 |
| Limburg | 4 | 3 | 2 | - | 2 | - | 1 | - | - | 1 | 0 | - | - | 13 (Note: Lokaal-Limburg: 3, Waterbelang Parkstad: 2, Waterbelang Midden-Limburg: 1, Waterbelang Westelijke Mijnstreek: 1, Waterbelang Heuvelland: 1, Waterbelang Venray en Maasduinen: 1, Waterbelang Maastricht: 1, Waterbelang Venlo: 1, Waterbelang Land van Weert + Leudal: 1, Waterbelang Horst-Helden-Beesel: 1) | 26 |
| Total | | | | | | | | | | | | | | | |
| Total | 118 | 97 | 55 | 50 | 37 | 36 | 21 | 14 | 13 | 10 | 5 | 5 | 3 | 48 | 518 |
| Total | 118 | 97 | 55 | 50 | 37 | 36 | 21 | 6 | | 10 | 5 | 5 | 3 | 48 | 518 |
| Compared to 2019 | +118 | +6 | -15 | +1 | +20 | -24 | -2 | -1 | +4 | -22 | +5 | +5 | +3 | -20 | +76 (Note: Due to a reduction in the number of guaranteed seats, the number of eligible seats has increased in all water boards) |
| Compared to 2019 | +118 | +6 | -15 | +1 | +20 | -24 | -2 | -2 | | -22 | +5 | +5 | +3 | -20 | +76 |
