= Administrative divisions of the Netherlands =

The Netherlands has several levels of administrative subdivisions. The first level of subdivision consists of 12 provinces. The second level of subdivision consists of 342 municipalities.

The country is also subdivided into 21 water districts, governed by a water board (waterschap or hoogheemraadschap), each having authority in matters concerning water management. Direct elections of the water boards take place every four years.

== Group of provinces ==
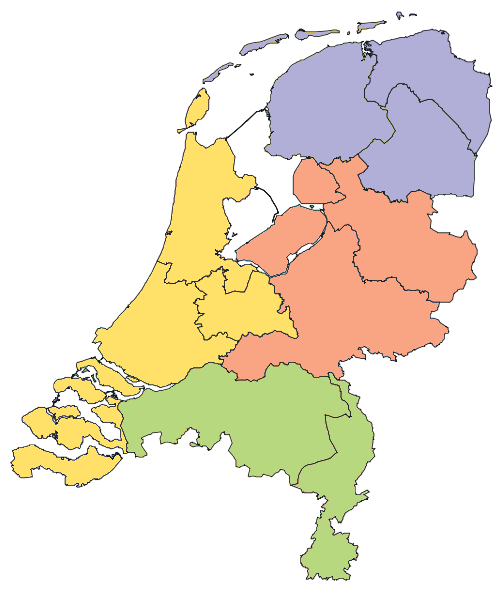
Groups of provinces.

The Group of provinces (Dutch: landsdeel) is a European subdivision of the Netherlands. It meets the needs of Eurostat, the European statistical institute, which has defined a classification of territorial units for statistics. These groups correspond to the first European statistical level (NUTS 1).

There are four of them: Northern Netherlands, Eastern Netherlands, Western Netherlands and Southern Netherlands.

== Provinces ==
Province	Coat of arms	ISO	Capital	Largest municipality	King's Commissioner	Number of municipalities (since 2023)	Total area		Land area		Population (2023)	Population density
Province	Coat of arms		Capital	Largest municipality	King's Commissioner	Number of municipalities (since 2023)	km^{2}	mi^{2}	km^{2}	mi^{2}	Population (2023)	Population density
Drenthe	Coat of arms of Drenthe	NL-DR	Assen	Emmen	Jetta Klijnsma (PvdA)	12	2,680	1,035	2,633	1,016	502,051	191/km^{2} (490/sq mi)
Flevoland	Coat of arms of Flevoland	NL-FL	Lelystad	Almere	Arjen Gerritsen (VVD)	6	2,412	931	1,410	544	444,701	315/km^{2} (820/sq mi)
Friesland	Coat of arms of Friesland	NL-FR	Leeuwarden		Arno Brok (VVD)	18	5,753	2,221	3,340	1,290	659,551	197/km^{2} (510/sq mi)
Gelderland	Coat of arms of Gelderland	NL-GE	Arnhem	Nijmegen	John Berends (CDA)	51	5,136	1,983	4,960	1,915	2,133,708	430/km^{2} (1,100/sq mi)
Groningen	Coat of arms of Groningen	NL-GR	Groningen		René Paas (CDA)	10	2,955	1,141	2,316	894	596,075	257/km^{2} (670/sq mi)
Limburg	Coat of arms of Limburg	NL-LI	Maastricht		Emile Roemer (SP)	31	2,210	853	2,145	828	1,128,367	526/km^{2} (1,360/sq mi)
North Brabant	Coat of arms of North Brabant	NL-NB	's-Hertogenbosch	Eindhoven	Ina Adema (VVD)	56	5,082	1,962	4,902	1,892	2,626,210	536/km^{2} (1,390/sq mi)
North Holland	Coat of arms of North Holland	NL-NH	Haarlem	Amsterdam	Arthur van Dijk (VVD)	44	4,092	1,580	2,663	1,028	2,952,622	1,109/km^{2} (2,870/sq mi)
Overijssel	Coat of arms of Overijssel	NL-OV	Zwolle	Enschede	Andries Heidema (CU)	25	3,421	1,321	3,317	1,281	1,184,333	357/km^{2} (920/sq mi)
South Holland	Coat of arms of South Holland	NL-ZH	The Hague	Rotterdam	Jaap Smit (CDA)	50	3,308	1,277	2,698	1,042	3,804,906	1,410/km^{2} (3,700/sq mi)
Utrecht	Coat of arms of Utrecht	NL-UT	Utrecht		Hans Oosters (PvdA)	26	1,560	602	1,484	573	1,387,643	935/km^{2} (2,420/sq mi)
Zeeland	Coat of arms of Zeeland	NL-ZE	Middelburg	Terneuzen	Han Polman (D66)	13	2,933	1,133	1,780	687	391,124	220/km^{2} (570/sq mi)

== COROP regions ==
A COROP region is a division of the Netherlands for statistical purposes, used by Statistics Netherlands, among others. The Dutch abbreviation stands for Coördinatiecommissie Regionaal Onderzoeksprogramma, literally the Coordination Commission Regional Research Programme. These divisions are also used in the EU designation as NUTS 3.

== Water boards ==
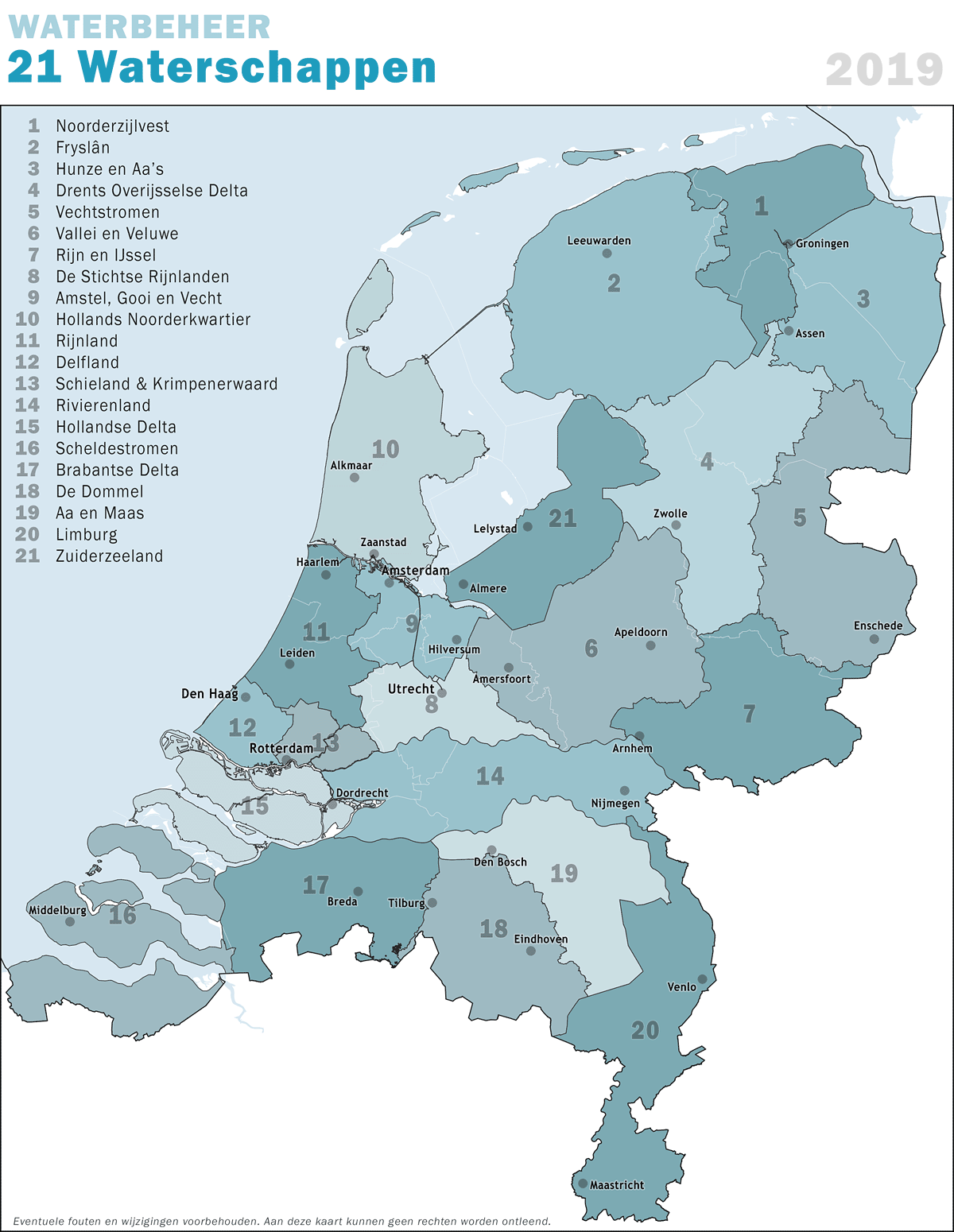
The 21 water boards in The Netherlands in 2019

Typically, a water board's territory is made up of one or more polders or watersheds. The territory of a water board generally covers several municipalities and may even include areas in two or more provinces. As of 2021, there are 21 water boards in The Netherlands.

1. Waterschap Noorderzijlvest (Groningen, Friesland and Drenthe)
2. Wetterskip Fryslân (Friesland and Groningen)
3. Waterschap Hunze en Aa's (Groningen and Drenthe)
4. Waterschap Drents Overijsselse Delta (Drenthe and Overijssel)
5. Waterschap Vechtstromen (Drenthe and Overijssel)
6. Waterschap Vallei en Veluwe (Utrecht and Gelderland)
7. Waterschap Rijn en IJssel (Gelderland)
8. Hoogheemraadschap De Stichtse Rijnlanden (Utrecht and South Holland)
9. Waterschap Amstel, Gooi en Vecht (North Holland, Utrecht and South Holland)
10. Hoogheemraadschap Hollands Noorderkwartier (North Holland)
11. Hoogheemraadschap van Rijnland (South Holland and North Holland)
12. Hoogheemraadschap van Delfland (South Holland)
13. Hoogheemraadschap van Schieland en de Krimpenerwaard (South Holland)
14. Waterschap Rivierenland (South Holland, Gelderland, Utrecht and North Brabant)
15. Waterschap Hollandse Delta (South Holland)
16. Waterschap Scheldestromen (Zeeland)
17. Waterschap Brabantse Delta (North Brabant)
18. Waterschap De Dommel (North Brabant)
19. Waterschap Aa en Maas (North Brabant)
20. Waterschap Limburg (Limburg)
21. Waterschap Zuiderzeeland (Flevoland)

== Municipalities ==
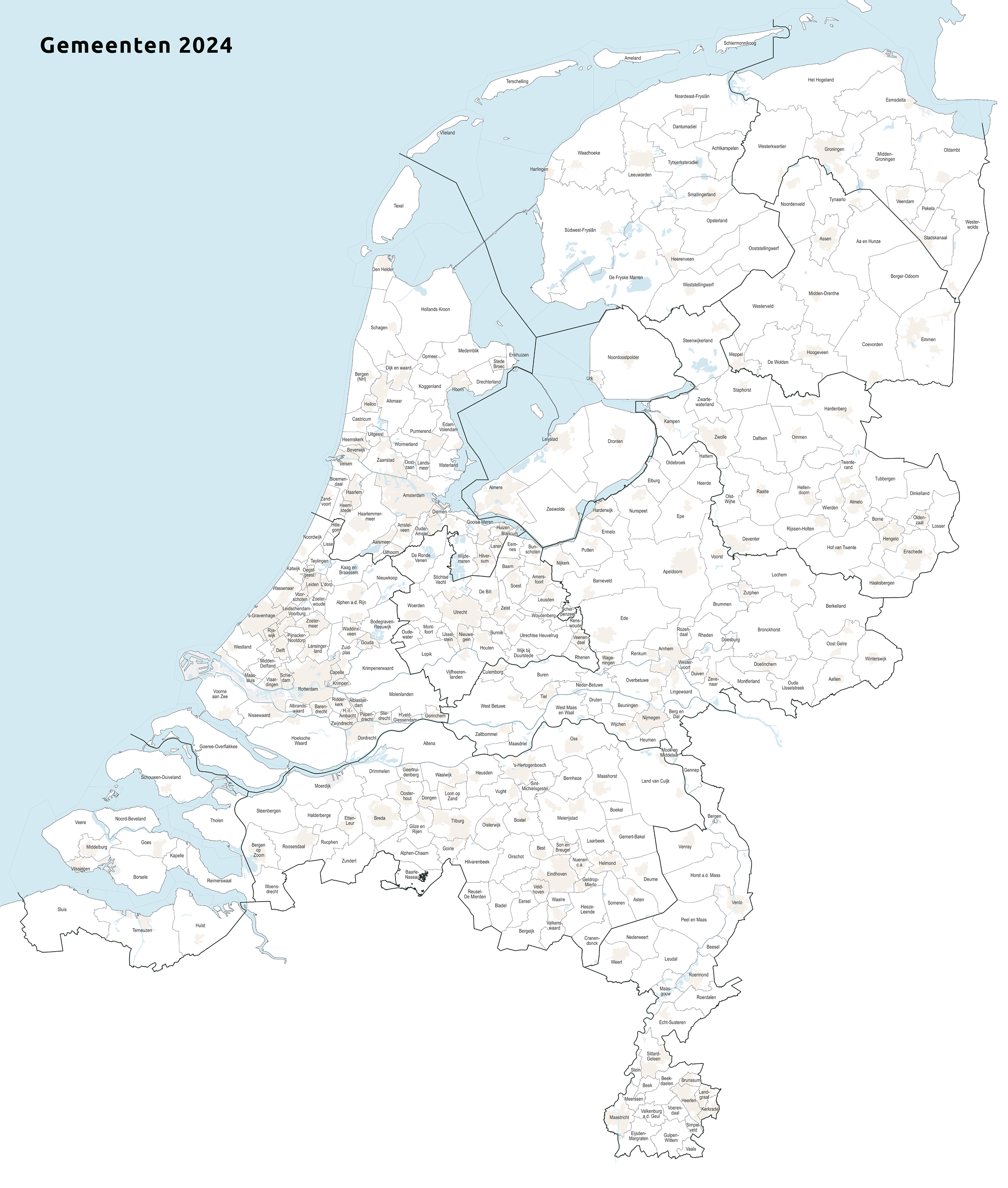
Municipalities of the Netherlands.

Since 1 January 2023, there have been 342 municipalities (Dutch: gemeenten). Municipalities are the second-level administrative division in the Netherlands and are subdivisions of their respective provinces. Their duties are delegated to them by the central government and they are ruled by a municipal council that is elected every four years. Municipal mergers have reduced the total number of municipalities by two-thirds since the first official boundaries were created in the mid 19th century. Municipalities themselves are informally subdivided into districts and neighbourhoods for administrative and statistical purposes.

These municipalities come in a wide range of sizes, Westervoort is the smallest with a land area of 7.03 km^{2} (2.71 sq mi) and Súdwest-Fryslân the largest with a land area of 523.01 km^{2} (201.94 sq mi). Schiermonnikoog is both the least populated and the least densely populated municipality at 23/km^{2} (60/sq mi). Amsterdam has the highest population with over 900,000 residents (31 March 2022), whereas The Hague is the most densely populated with a density of 6,620/km^{2} (17,100/sq mi).

== Caribbean Netherlands ==
The three islands of Bonaire, Sint Eustatius, and Saba, officially known as Caribbean Netherlands, are classified as public bodies of a special constitutional category, Caribbean public bodies. They are not part of any province.
