= 2019 Dutch water board elections =

Dutch water board elections held in 2019

← 2015	20 March 2019	2023 →

442 seats divided over 21 water boards
- Turnout: 51.25%
	Majority party	Minority party	Third party
Party	WN	VVD	CDA
Last election	78	66	71
Seats won	85	70	60
Seat change	7 ▲	4 ▲	11 ▼
Popular vote	1,200,560	1,034,251	883,678
Percentage	17.26%	14.87%	12.71%
	Fourth party	Fifth party	Sixth party
Party	PvdA	50+	AWP
Last election	49	23	18
Seats won	49	32	21
Seat change	0	9 ▲	3 ▲
Popular vote	785,176	524,548	384,373
Percentage	11,29%	7.54%	5.53%
	Seventh party	Eighth party	Ninth party
Party	PvdD	CU	SGP
Last election	15	19	13
Seats won	17	15	9
Seat change	2 ▲	4 ▼	4 ▼
Popular vote	331,933	309,148	168,996
Percentage	4.77%	4.45%	2.43%

Water board elections were held in the European Netherlands on 20 March 2019 to elect the resident members of the country's twenty-one water boards (442 seats in total). The elections were held on the same day as the 2019 Dutch provincial elections and island council elections. Water Natuurlijk remained the largest party, winning 85 seats in 20 water boards.

== Results ==
Party	Votes	%	Seats	+/–
Water Natuurlijk	1,200,560	17.26	85	+7
People's Party for Freedom and Democracy	1,034,251	14.87	70	+4
Christian Democratic Appeal	883,678	12.71	60	−11
Labour Party	785,176	11.29	49	0
50PLUS	524,548	7.54	32	+9
General Water Board Party	384,373	5.53	21	+3
Party for the Animals	331,933	4.77	17	+2
Christian Union	309,148	4.45	15	−4
Reformed Political Party	168,996	2.43	9	−4
Others	1,331,542	19.15	84	−8
Total	6,954,205	100.00	442	−2
Valid votes	6,954,205	97.39		
Invalid/blank votes	186,313	2.61		
Total votes	7,140,518	100.00		
Registered voters/turnout	13,933,879	51.25		
Source: Kiesraad
