= Water Natuurlijk =

Dutch political party

- Chairperson: Peter Snoeren
- Founded: 2008
- Ideology: Green politics
- Colours: Blue and green
- Water boards: 97 / 442

Website
- www.waternatuurlijk.nl

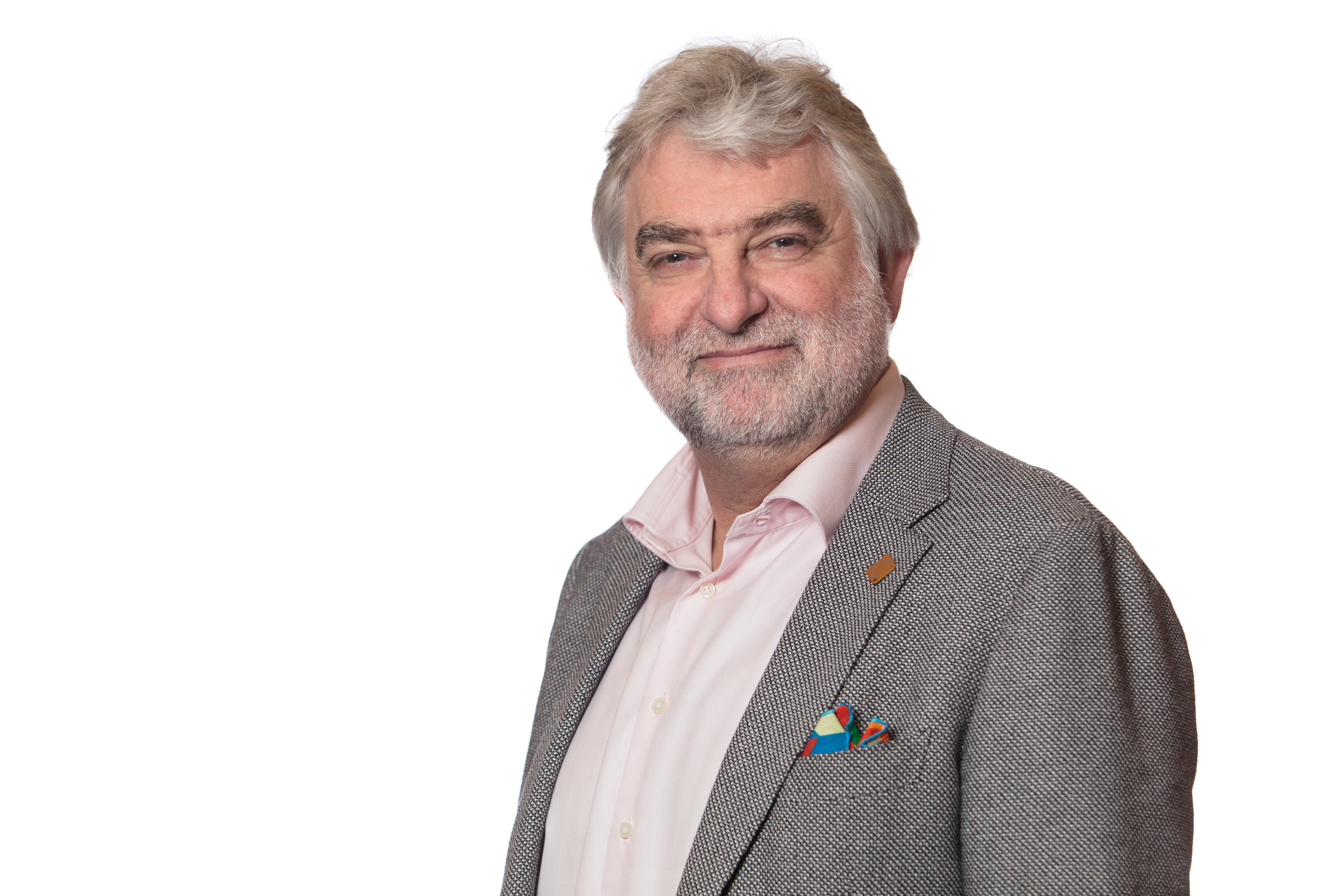
Peter Snoeren, chairperson of Water Natuurlijk

Water Natuurlijk (lit. 'Water Naturally' or 'Water Of Course') is a political party in the Netherlands that focuses exclusively on water board politics. The party received the highest number of votes in the 2008, 2015 and 2019 water board elections.

== History ==
Water Natuurlijk was founded in 2008 by a number of environmental and recreational organizations. The party aims to improve water quality to ensure the well-being and safety of humans, animals and plants. The party is endorsed by Democrats 66, GroenLinks and Volt Netherlands, who refrain from participating in water board elections.

== Election results ==
=== Water board elections ===
Election year	Water boards			
Election year	Votes	%	# of overall seats won	+/−
2008	502,294	19.67	100 / 502	New
2015	895,232	16.63	84 / 444	▼16
2019	1,252,009	18.00	91 / 442	▲7
2023	1,216,350	15.95	97 / 518	▲6

Water board		Seats			
(After merger)	(Before merger)	2008	2015	2019	2023
Aa en Maas		6	6	7	8
Amstel, Gooi en Vecht		5	4	4	4
Brabantse Delta		4	3	2	3
Delfland		4	3	3	4
De Dommel		6	6	8	7
De Stichtse Rijnlanden		6	6	7	6
Drents Overijsselse Delta	Groot Salland	6	5	5	5
Drents Overijsselse Delta	Reest en Wieden	3	2	5	5
Fryslân		3	3	3	4
Hollandse Delta		3	2	1	2
Hollands Noorderkwartier		4	4	3	2
Hunze en Aa's		4	4	5	5
Limburg	Peel en Maasvallei	3	3	3	3
Limburg	Roer en Overmaas	3	3	3	3
Noorderzijlvest		4	4	5	6
Rijnland		4	3	3	4
Rijn en IJssel		4	5	5	5
Rivierenland		3	3	4	5
Scheldestromen	Zeeuwse Eilanden	3	2	2	2
Scheldestromen	Zeeuws-Vlaanderen	2	2	2	2
Schieland en de Krimpenerwaard		4	4	6	6
Vallei en Veluwe	Vallei en Eem	5	3	3	3
Vallei en Veluwe	Veluwe	3	3	3	3
Vechtstromen	Regge en Dinkel	—	—	6	7
Vechtstromen	Velt en Vecht	3	—	6	7
Zuiderzeeland		—	6	6	6
Total		100 of 502	84 of 444	91 of 442	97 of 518

== See also ==
- General Water Board Party
