= Eendragt =

Eendragt can refer to:

- Eendragt, Groningen, Netherlands, a regional water authority
- Eendragt, Zeeland, Netherlands, a village
- Eendracht (1655 ship), also called Eendragt
