= Delfland =

Delfland may refer to the following entities in South Holland, the Netherlands

- Midden-Delfland, a municipality
- Hoogheemraadschap van Delfland, a water board
