= Bert Middel =

Dutch politician (1952–2026)

- Bert Middel in 1990

Member of the House of Representatives
- In office 16 November 1989 – 17 May 1994
- In office 30 August 1994 – 23 May 2002

Member of the Senate
- In office 10 June 2003 – 12 June 2007

Personal details
- Born: Lambertus Peter Middel; 24 June 1952 Groningen, Netherlands
- Died: 28 August 2026 (aged 74) Tasola, Italy
- Party: PvdA (1969–2026)
- Children: 4
- Education: University of Groningen

Lambertus Peter "Bert" Middel (24 June 1952 – 28 August 2026) was a Dutch politician and administrator. He was a member of the Dutch House of Representatives and Senate, served as mayor of Smallingerland municipality and as dike warden (dijkgraaf) of the Noorderzijlvest water board.

== Early life ==
Middel grew up in the Oosterparkwijk and the Rivierenbuurt in Groningen. He came from a 'red' working-class background. In his autobiographical book Stegengeur, Middel described his childhood in a working-class neighborhood in Groningen the 1950s and 1960s. In it, he focused on navigating social mobility from a working-class background and the culture shock that working-class children experience when furthering their education.

He attended the Heymans College in Groningen, where he obtained his HBS-B diploma. Middel subsequently studied political sociology at the University of Groningen from 1970 to 1975 and also completed a teacher training course.

== Political career ==
=== Early political career ===
During and after his studies, he worked as a teacher in Drachten, action coordinator for the Worldshops, research assistant, and lecturer at the Library and Documentation Academy, among other roles. Later, he was director of a research and organizational consultancy firm in Assen and of an institute for schooling and training in Havelte and Oosterhesselen.

Middel became a member of the Labour Party (PvdA) in 1969. In 1972, he became rent ombudsman for the local PvdA in Groningen. In November 1973, at the age of 21, he became branch chairman of the PvdA Groningen. In 1974, he was considered as a candidate for the Groningen municipal council, but could not take office due to his age. From 1978 to 1986, he was a municipal councilor in Assen. Within the PvdA, he was, among other things, a member of the party executive and chairman of a committee that made proposals for the renewal of the party's internal organization and culture.

=== National politics ===
In November 1989, Middel became a member of the House of Representatives, succeeding Relus ter Beek, who became a minister. After the 1994 elections, he initially did not return as MP, but in August of that year he became an MP again after several PvdA members left the House of Representatives to join the First Kok cabinet. As an MP, Middel focused on, among other subjects, immigration and asylum policy, social affairs, employee participation, sports, media, minorities, and the position of war victims. In doing so, he advocated for asylum seekers and welfare recipients.

Together with Christian Democratic Appeal (CDA) MP Helmer Koetje, Middel submitted an amendment in 1991 allowing for the establishment of regional television, which paved the way for the launch of regional television channels, starting with TV Oost. Another amendment submitted by him in 1997 led to the expansion of employee representation in companies with ten to fifty employees, giving employees of smaller companies a formal form of employee participation. In 1992, Middel was one of the nine PvdA MPs who voted against the implementation agreement of the Schengen Agreement.

In 1995, Middel was briefly a member of the Provincial Council of Drenthe. He was the lead candidate in the provincial elections, but despite having formed a new provincial executive himself, he withdrew as a candidate deputy due to internal divisions within the PvdA faction.

In May 2002, Middel left the House of Representatives. Upon his departure, he refused a royal honour. From 2002 to 2005, he was a lecturer in Care and Welfare at the Noordelijke Hogeschool Leeuwarden. From 2003 to 2007, he was a member of the Senate, where he focused primarily on foreign affairs and defence.

=== Mayor and dijkgraaf ===
On December 1, 2005, he was appointed mayor of Smallingerland. Within the municipal administration, he focused on public order and safety, administrative cooperation, and the representation of the municipality. In 2007 and 2008, Middel worked to bring back drag racing to Drachten Airport, leading negotiations following a unanimous decision by the Smallingerland municipal council. The municipal council intended on nominating Middel for a second term as mayor, but in 2011 he chose to join the water board administration.

On January 1, 2012, he took office as dike warden (dijkgraaf) of the Noorderzijlvest water board. Shortly after his appointment, the management area faced high water levels, causing problems around the Eems Canal dike. In 2013, Middel warned that earthquakes caused by gas extraction in Groningen also posed a risk to the dikes along the Eems Canal. He advocated for strengthening the dikes and believed that both the Dutch government and Nederlandse Aardolie Maatschappij should contribute to the costs. Middel remained dike warden until his retirement on July 1, 2022.

Middel was chairman of the supervisory board of FC Groningen from 2013 to 2017, succeeding Ed Zijp.

=== Publicist ===
Middel published on the history and organization of social democracy, local government, and his own experiences in politics. After leaving the House of Representatives, Middel wrote Politiek handwerk, in which he looked back on his career in national politics. In 2019, he published Die meneer is van ons..., about the power and powerlessness of social democracy. He also wrote columns for the Leeuwarder Courant, Binnenlands Bestuur, and the magazine Zorg en Welzijn, among other publications.

== Personal life ==
Bert Middel had one daughter and three sons. He died on August 28, 2026, at the age of 74 in Italy.
