= Nederland met een Plan =

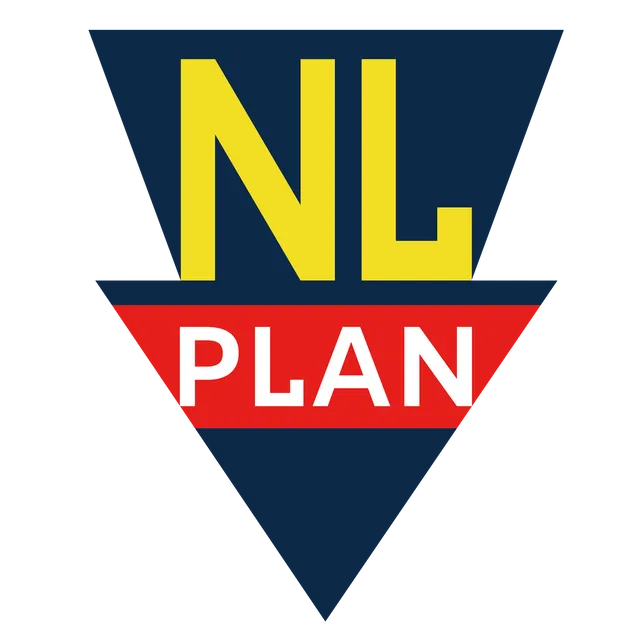
- Abbreviation: NLPLAN
- Leader: Kok Kuen Chan
- Founded: 2022
- Ideology: Participatory democracy
- Colors: Navy Blue; Yellow; Red
- Slogan: "De enige partij met een plan" (The only party with a plan)
- Senate: 0 / 75
- House of Representatives: 0 / 150
- European Parliament: 0 / 31

Website
- nlplan.nl

Nederland met een Plan (pronounced [ˈneːdərlɑnt mɛt əm ˈplɑn]; transl. "Netherlands with a plan"; NLPLAN) is a political party in the Netherlands. The party leader is Kok Kuen Chan.

== History ==
The party participated in the 2023 provincial elections in North Holland as Nederland met een PLAN SVP – in which SVP stood for Samenwerkende Vrije Partijen ('United Free Parties'), but did not win any seats. It also participated in the 2023 general elections, and was eligible in 17 of the 20 electoral districts, but was unable to obtain a seat, only getting 0.06% of the vote.

=== Chinese links ===
RTL Nieuws and Follow The Money reported in 2024 that NLPLAN was closely tied to united front people and organizations and that a significant portion of its political donations originated from organizations such as the Dutch branch of the China Council for the Promotion of Peaceful National Reunification. The party was also found to promote pro-Chinese stances in newspapers targeted at Chinese people in the Netherlands.

== Positions ==
The party is, among other things, in favor of having more color in politics, increasing the minimum wage, free public transportation, and is against higher interest rates on student loans.

== Election results ==
=== House of Representatives ===
| Election | Lijsttrekker | Votes | % | Seats | +/– |
|---|---|---|---|---|---|
| 2023 | Kok Kuen Chan | 5,487 | 0.05 | 0 / 150 | New |
| 2025 | Kok Kuen Chan | 2,299 | 0.02 | 0 / 150 | 0 |

=== European Parliament ===
| Election | List | Votes | % | Seats | +/– | EP Group |
|---|---|---|---|---|---|---|
| 2024 | List | 8,360 | 0.13 (#19) | 0 / 31 | New | – |

=== Provincial ===
| Election year | States-Provincial | | | |
| Election year | # of overall votes | % of overall vote | # of overall seats won | +/– |
|---|---|---|---|---|
| 2023 | 3,518 | 0.05% | 0 / 570 | New |

=== Municipal elections ===
==== Amsterdam ====
| Election | Votes | % | Seats | +/– |
|---|---|---|---|---|
| 2026 | 236 | 0.07% | 0 / 45 | New |
