= Eendragt, Zeeland =

Village in Zeeland, Netherlands

Coordinates: 51°21′N 3°54′E

Eendragt is a hamlet in the municipality of Terneuzen, in the Dutch province of Zeeland. The hamlet, located in the region of Zeeuws-Vlaanderen, lies east of Griete and is situated on the Eendragtweg. Eendragt consists of small production forests, a campsite and several farms with large arable lands around them.
