= Noorderzijlvest =

Waterschap Noorderzijlvest
- Flag Coat of arms

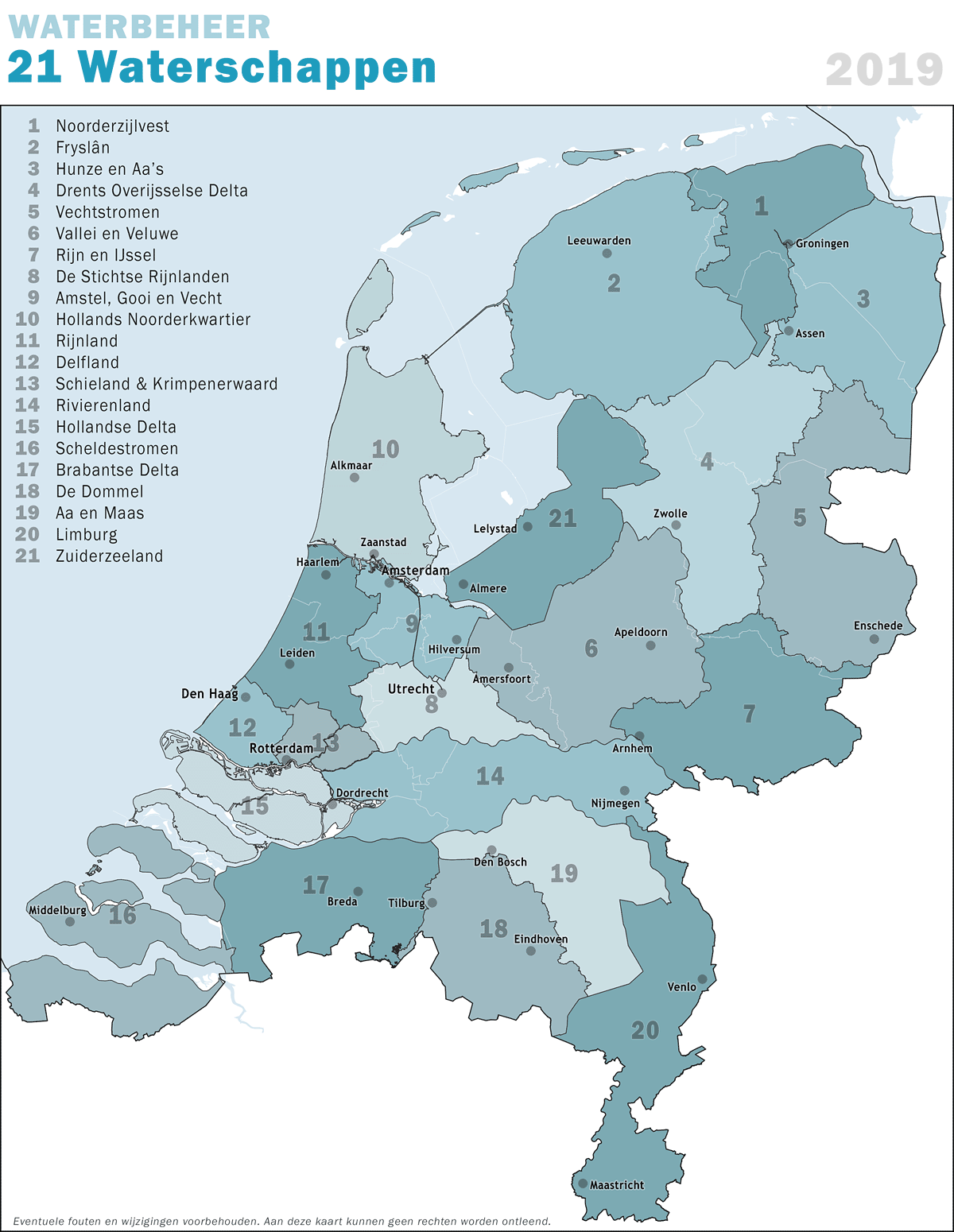
- Map of the Dutch water boards (2019). Noorderzijlvest is indicated with a 1.
- Country: Netherlands
- Province: Groningen, Friesland, Drenthe
- Seat (waterschapshuis): Groningen

Government
  - Dijkgraaf: Bert Middel

Area
  - Total: 1,440 km^{2} (560 sq mi)
- Time zone: UTC+1
  - Summer (DST): UTC+2
- Website: www.noorderzijlvest.nl

Waterschap Noorderzijlvest (WNZV) is a Dutch regional water authority covering the provinces of Groningen, Friesland, and Drenthe. It has its seat in the city of Groningen. It is responsible for water management, water quality and sewage water treatment in its catchment area.

Like many of the present water boards in the Netherlands, WNZV was created through a series of mergers of smaller regional boards over centuries. The documented history of these smaller boards and the dike rights that preceded them goes as far back as 1408.

The present WNZV was created in the year 2000 from the merger of Water Board Noorderzijlvest, Zuiveringschap Drenthe and the Service Purification Management of Groningen province.
