= Hoogheemraadschap van Delfland =

- Flag Coat of arms

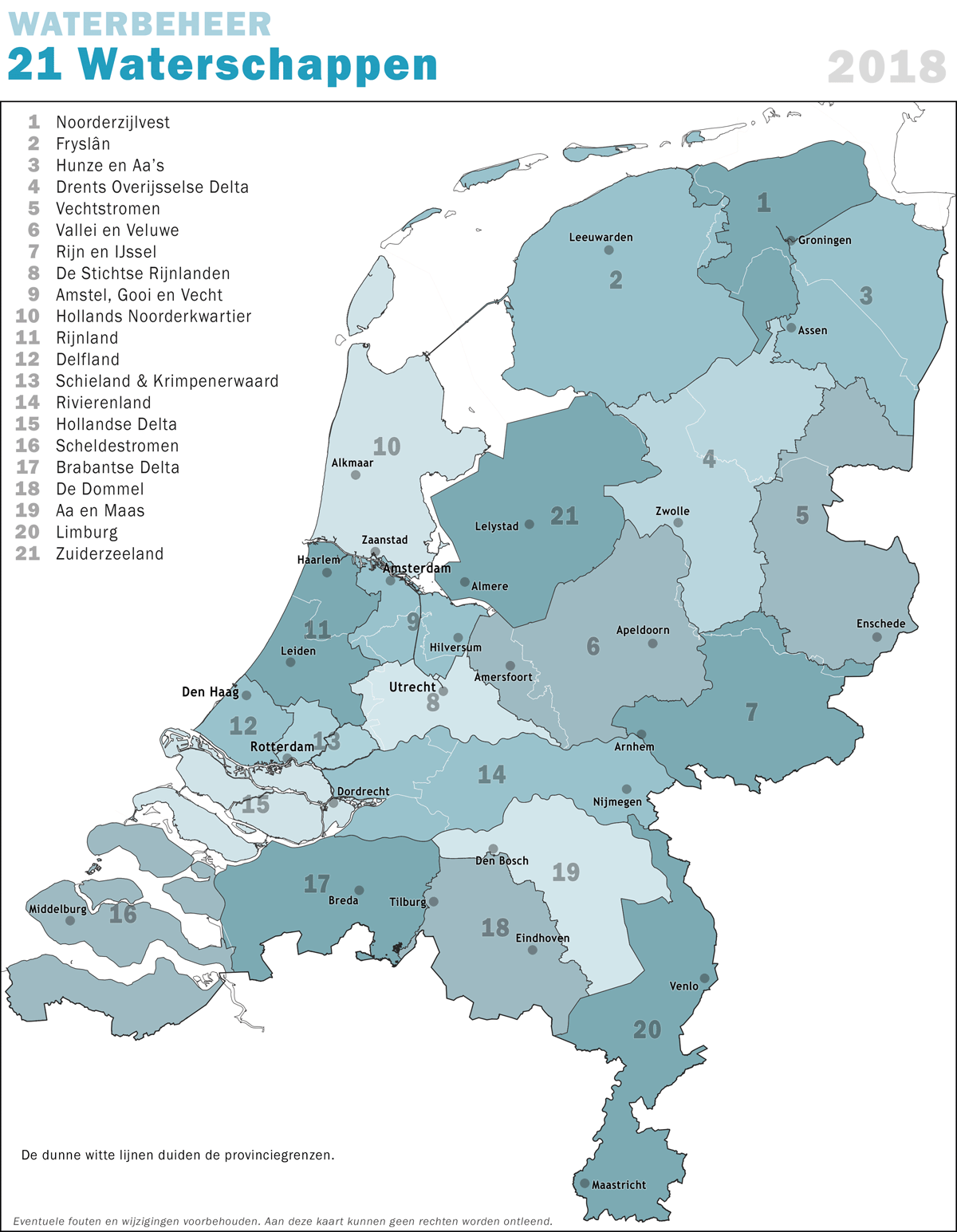
- Coordinates: 52.0118°N 4.3556°E
- Country: Netherlands
- Heemraden van Delfland: 1289
- Founder: William I, Duke of Bavaria
- Seat (Gemeenlandshuis): Delft

Government
  - Dijkgraaf: Michiel van Haersma Buma

Area
  - Total: 410 km^{2} (160 sq mi)

Population
  - Total: 1,400,000
  - Density: 3,400/km^{2} (8,800/sq mi)
- Website: www.hhdelfland.nl

The Hoogheemraadschap van Delfland is a Dutch waterboard, which is responsible for water management. It covers the municipalities of Delft, Midden-Delfland and The Hague, and is fully located in the province of South Holland. The organization was established in 1289 when William I, Duke of Bavaria (As William V, Count of Holland) authorized the "Heemraden of Delft" to manage water and serve as a court.

== Tasks ==
The Hoogheemraadschap is tasked with water quality and water quantity issues in its region. Its main activities are

- Maintaining safe dykes and dunes. Management is based on both sea and river based flood control.
- Operation of several wastewater treatment plants of which the one in Harnaschpolder is the largest.

== Organization ==
The organization is led by a general board called "verenigde vergadering", consisting of 30 representatives which are representatives of the inhabitants (21 by direct elections), industry (4), owners of open land (mainly farmers) (4) and owners of nature (1). The present constitution is:

Category	Party	Seats
Industry		4
Open land		4
Nature		1
Inhabitants	CDA	3
Inhabitants	Partij van de Arbeid	3
Inhabitants	VVD	3
Inhabitants	Water Natuurlijk	3
Inhabitants	Algemene Waterschapspartij	2
Inhabitants	Christenunie SGP	1
Inhabitants	55+	1
Inhabitants	Integer Liberaal	3
Inhabitants	Partij voor de Dieren	2

The inhabitants parties of VVD, AWP, CDA and Water Natuurlijk together with the representatives of Land and Industry together form the governing coalition. The 5 Hoogheemraden that form with the Dijkgraaf the Dagelijks Bestuur (Executive Council) thus stem from those 5 groups. The civil organization employs 550 people and has a turn over of 260 million euro.

== Gemeenlandshuis ==
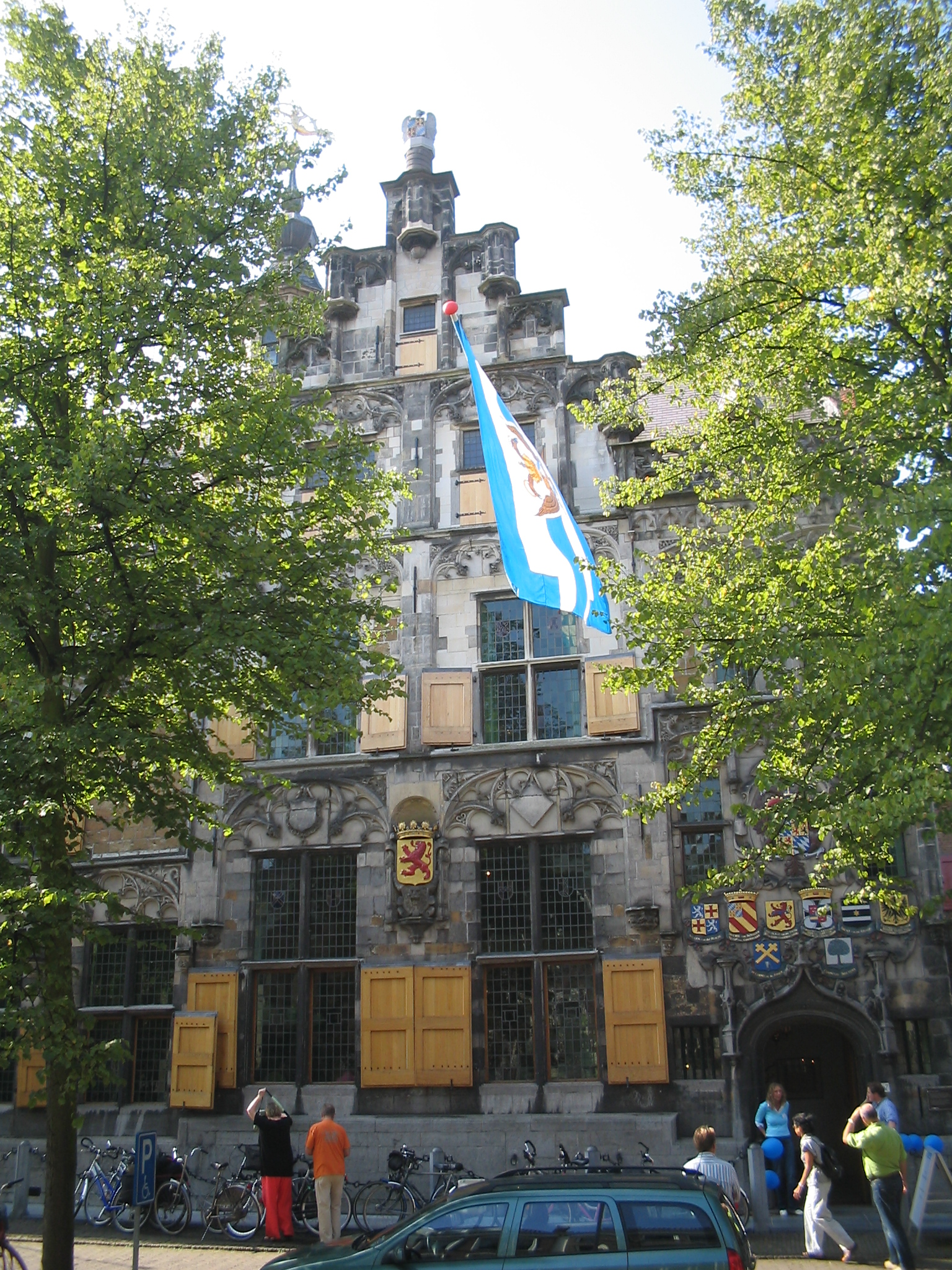
Gemeenlandshuis of Delfland

The gemeenlandshuis at the Oude Delft in Delft houses the main office of the Delfland Water Board. The building is a rijksmonument and was built in 1505. The Late-Gothic building, situated on the Oude Delft 167, was built in 1505. The first owner was Jan de Huyter, bailiff of Delft and steward of Delfland. Later occupants were Philips, Count of Hohenlohe who was married to Maria of Nassau, a daughter of Willem of Orange. The Delfland Water Board has been established here since 1645.

The building contains a large collection of old maps of Delfland. A large number of Coats of Arms cover the sandstone façade. Fortunately the façade was spared during the fire of 1536 which burned through the city of Delft. The main entrance to the Delfland Water Board is now situated on the Phoenixstraat where more recently buildings been added on.

== External sources ==
- Official website
