= General Water Board Party =

General Water Board Party Algemene Waterschapspartij
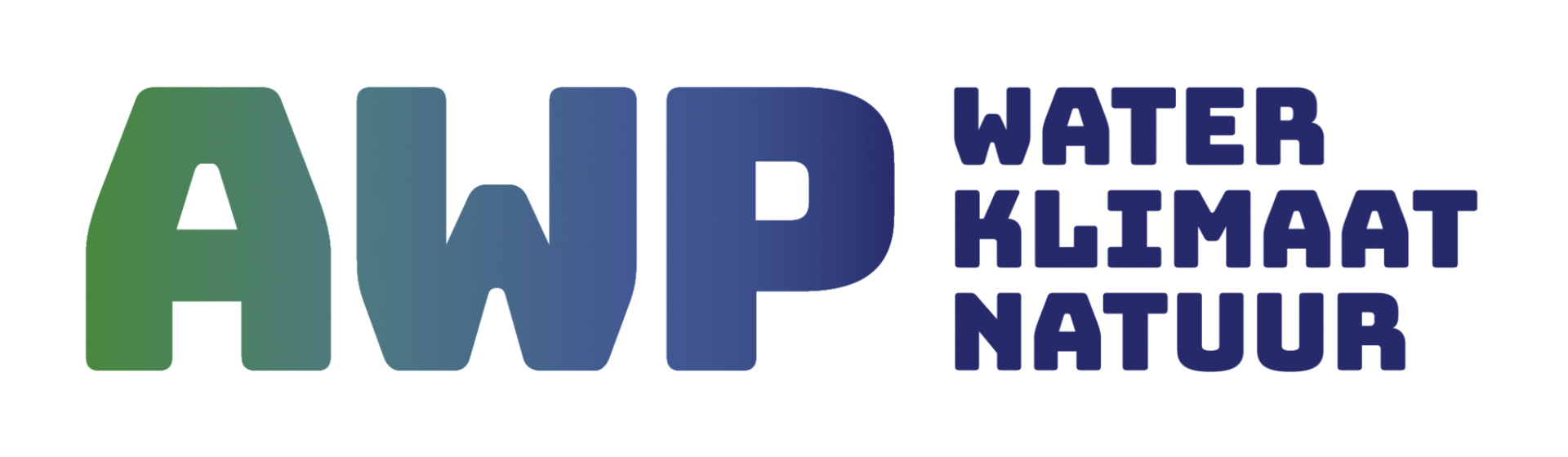
- Abbreviation: AWP
- Chairperson: Ron van Megen
- Founded: 2007
- Slogan: Niet politiek, wel deskundig! (Not political, but knowledgeable!)
- Water boards: 21 / 518

Website
- awp.nu

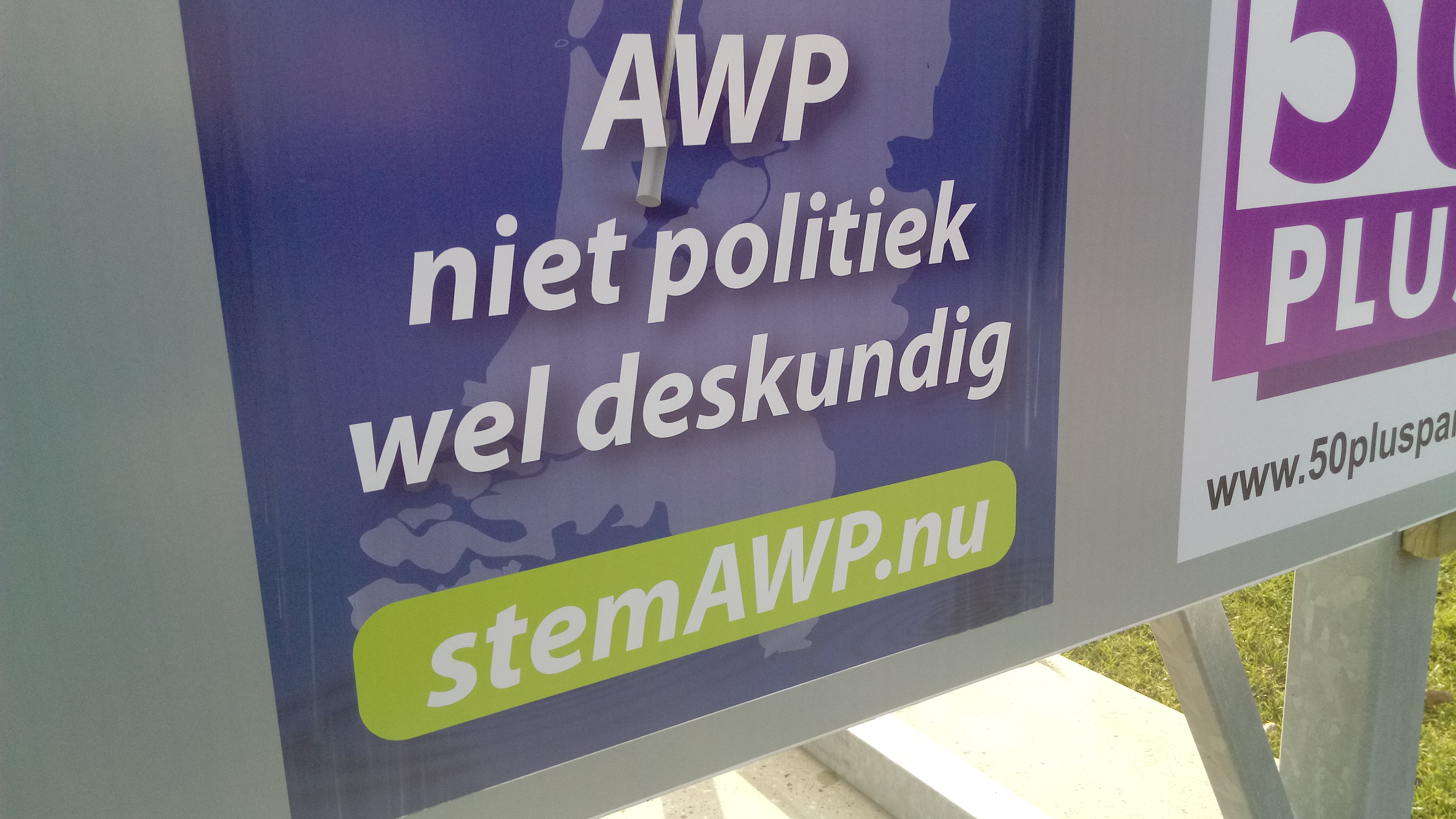
Election poster in 2019

The General Water Board Party (Dutch: Algemene Waterschapspartij, AWP) is a political party in the Netherlands that focuses exclusively on water board politics. It is one of the two nationwide water board parties, the other being Water Natuurlijk. The party aims to retain the water boards as a democratic, functional organization that excels in high-quality and efficient water management.

== History ==
The party was formed in 2007 in anticipation of the 2008 water board elections, when for the first time a party-based (rather than an individual-based) election system was used. Following the 2008 elections, the party gained representation in 22 water boards with 32 seats in total.
