= Waterschap Hollandse Delta =

- Flag Coat of arms
- Interactive map of Waterschap Hollandse Delta
- Coordinates: 51.8°N 4.6°E
- Country: Netherlands
- Province: South Holland
- Seat (waterschapshuis): Ridderkerk

Government
  - Dijkgraaf: J.M. Geluk

Area
  - Total: 1,018 km^{2} (393 sq mi)
- Time zone: UTC+1
  - Summer (DST): UTC+2
- Website: www.wshd.nl

Waterschap Hollandse Delta (WSHD) is a Dutch regional water authority covering the south of South Holland with its seat in Ridderkerk. The area it encompasses includes Rotterdam (south of the Nieuwe Maas) as well as the (former) islands Goeree-Overflakkee, Hoeksche Waard, Voorne-Putten, the Island of Dordrecht, IJsselmonde, Rozenburg and Tiengemeten.

It is responsible for water management, water quality and sewage water treatment and was formed from a merger of 4 regional water authorities in January 2005.
