= Water board (Netherlands) =

Water management authorities in the Netherlands

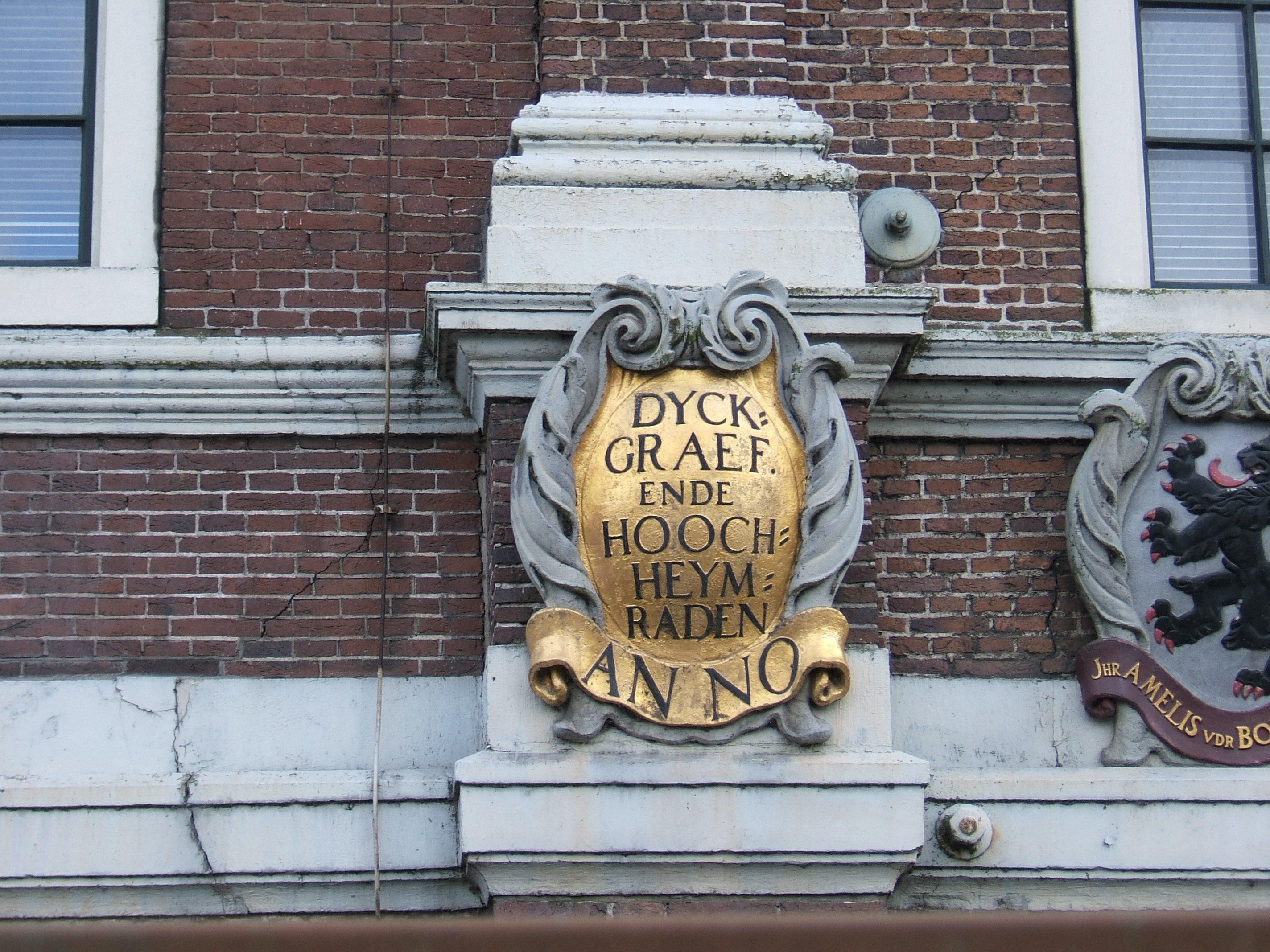
Gable stone on a 1645 gemeenlandshuis in Halfweg

In the Netherlands, a water board, water council or water authority (Dutch: waterschap or heemraadschap) is a regional governing body solely charged with the management of surface water in the environment. Water boards are independent of administrative governing bodies like provinces and municipalities. In general, they are responsible for managing rivers and canals, issues with the flow of watercourses and drainage issues, water collection, flood and erosion prevention and provision of potable water. They manage polder systems, water levels, water barriers and locks, enforcements, water quality and sewage treatment in their respective regions. The concept of a coordinating "High Water Authority" (Hoogheemraadschap) originated in what now is the province of South Holland in the 12th century.

== Background ==
Since the settlement of the Netherlands, large parts of the land have been constantly threatened by rivers and the sea. Fertile soil and peatlands often were located near rivers, thus engineering water courses was part of daily life for farmers, landowners and peat extractors. Rivers and canals were also important ways for transportation that had to be dug and kept navigable.

Ancient Roman settlements from 50 - 350 AD built harbours, riverside enforcements, waterdraining canals, dikes and mounds. From the year 1000 onward, continuing problems in water management in wide areas along the Rhine river between Utrecht and the North Sea caused farmers, landowners and civilians with administrative responsibilities to collaborate. Around 1122 in the area around Wijk bij Duurstede, southeast of Utrecht, a collaborative water household organisation was founded to build and maintain a dam in the Rhine. In Friesland in the 12th century the right to build a sea dike was granted, and in the area around Leiden a water household managing collaboration was established.

Nowadays around 26 percent of the Netherlands' surface is at or below mean sea level and several branches of the Rhine-Meuse-Scheldt delta run through this relatively small country. Historically there always was a good deal of coastal and river flooding. Flood control in the Netherlands is a national policy priority, since about two-thirds of the country is vulnerable to flooding and the whole country is densely populated. Natural and man-made sand dunes along the sea coast, man-made dikes, dams and floodgates, among which the Delta Works, (Dutch: Deltawerken) provide defense against high-tide and storm surges from the sea and water overflow from the rivers. River dikes prevent flooding of land by the major rivers Rhine and Meuse, while a system of drainage ditches, canals and pumping stations (historically: windmills) keep the low-lying parts available for habitation and agriculture. Water councils are regional governing bodies organised along a specific water-household system, responsible for maintenance and improvement of the system. All organisations and their works are financed by citizens and companies based in the Netherlands, through various taxes.

== History ==
=== Origins and early development ===
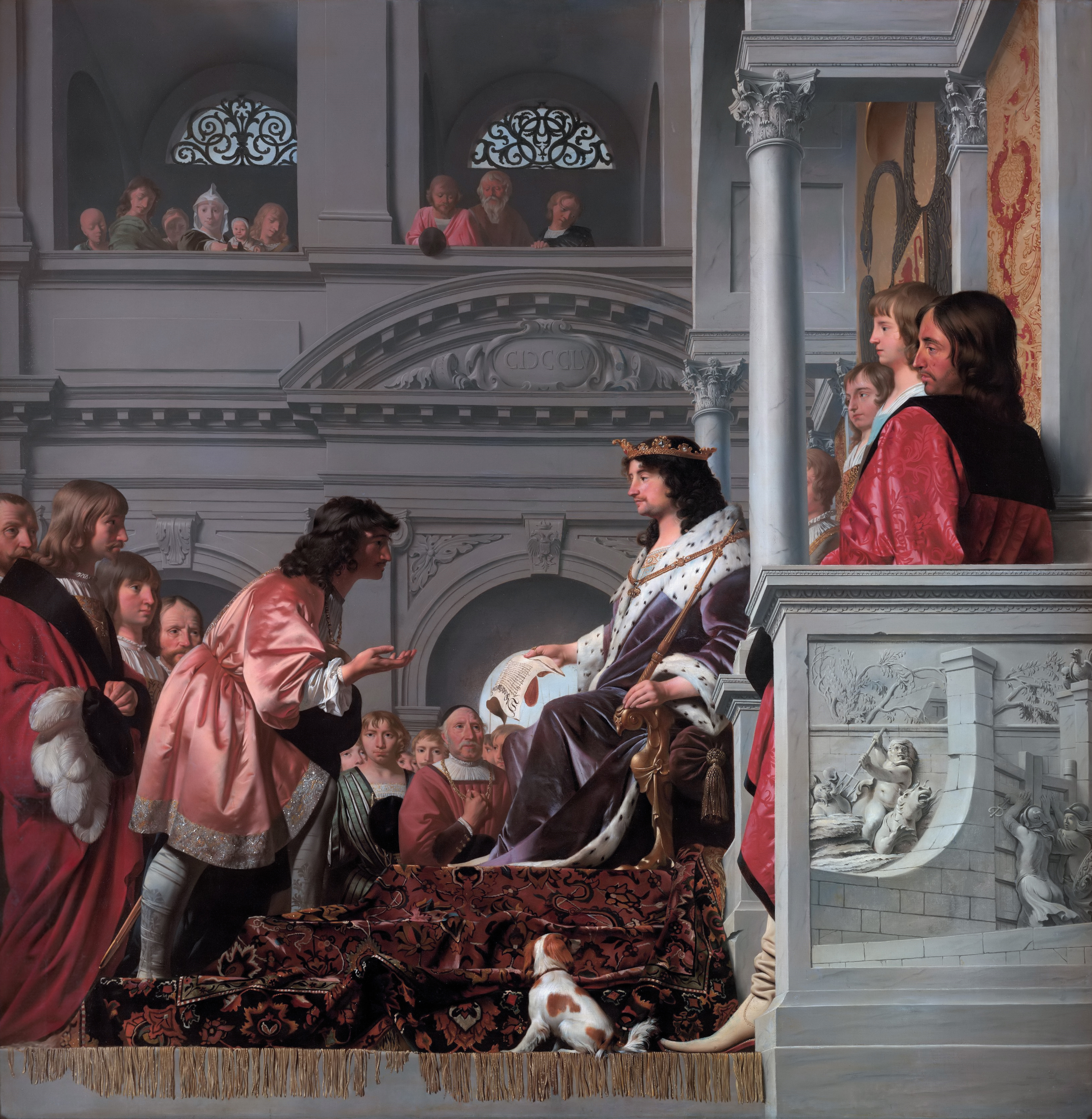
1654 painting by Cesar van Everdingen and Pieter Post, depicting Count William II of Holland and Zeeland granting privileges in 1255 to the Spaarndam dijkgraaf and hoogheemraden, an organisation that would evolve into the Hoogheemraadschap van Rijnland.

The methodical organisation of surface water household management emerged as lowlands were drained for agriculture. Dikes and water control structures were built and maintained by those directly benefiting from them, mostly farmers and landowners. As the structures got more extensive and complex, councils were formed by people with a common interest in controlling the water levels of their land. The first water councils were formed in the 12th century, often controlling a single polder or dike.

As these collaborative groups became better organised, the counts of Holland began granting charters to the boards. In 1255 a cooperating group of water boards in the Old Rhine area was appointed by Count William II of Holland and Zeeland to become central coordinator of all water course works in the area under the name "High Water Council", in Dutch Hoogheemraadschap. Early works were the building of draining canals around the city of Leiden. From 1408 on, with the first at Zoeterwoude, wind-operated machines (windmills) are being installed along the Old Rhine, to pump water from the lowlands into the river and drainage canals.

Water councils were also granted the right to constitute bylaws. The ever-present threat of loss of life, land, animals and goods required short lines of communication between authorities and the people who did design, build and maintain the infrastructure. The threat of flooding in a heerlijkheid was dealt with by authorities organised around a certain water household system and water boards were chaired by the local nobility. Water boards were set up to maintain integrity of water drainage and defences around local polders, to maintain waterways inside polders and to control various water levels in and outside local polders. The mandate of these water boards (which remains largely unchanged) was maintenance of dikes, dunes and waterways (and roads too, in several municipalities), control of water level and quality of all surface water (including punishment of polluters). The original water boards varied much in organisation, power and area they managed. The differences were often caused by different circumstances, whether they had to defend a sea dike against a storm surge or keep water level in a polder within bounds. Hoogheemraadschappen were coordinating bodies, responsible for protecting the land against the sea and for regulating water levels of various canals and lakes into which water was pumped from polders and waterschappen.

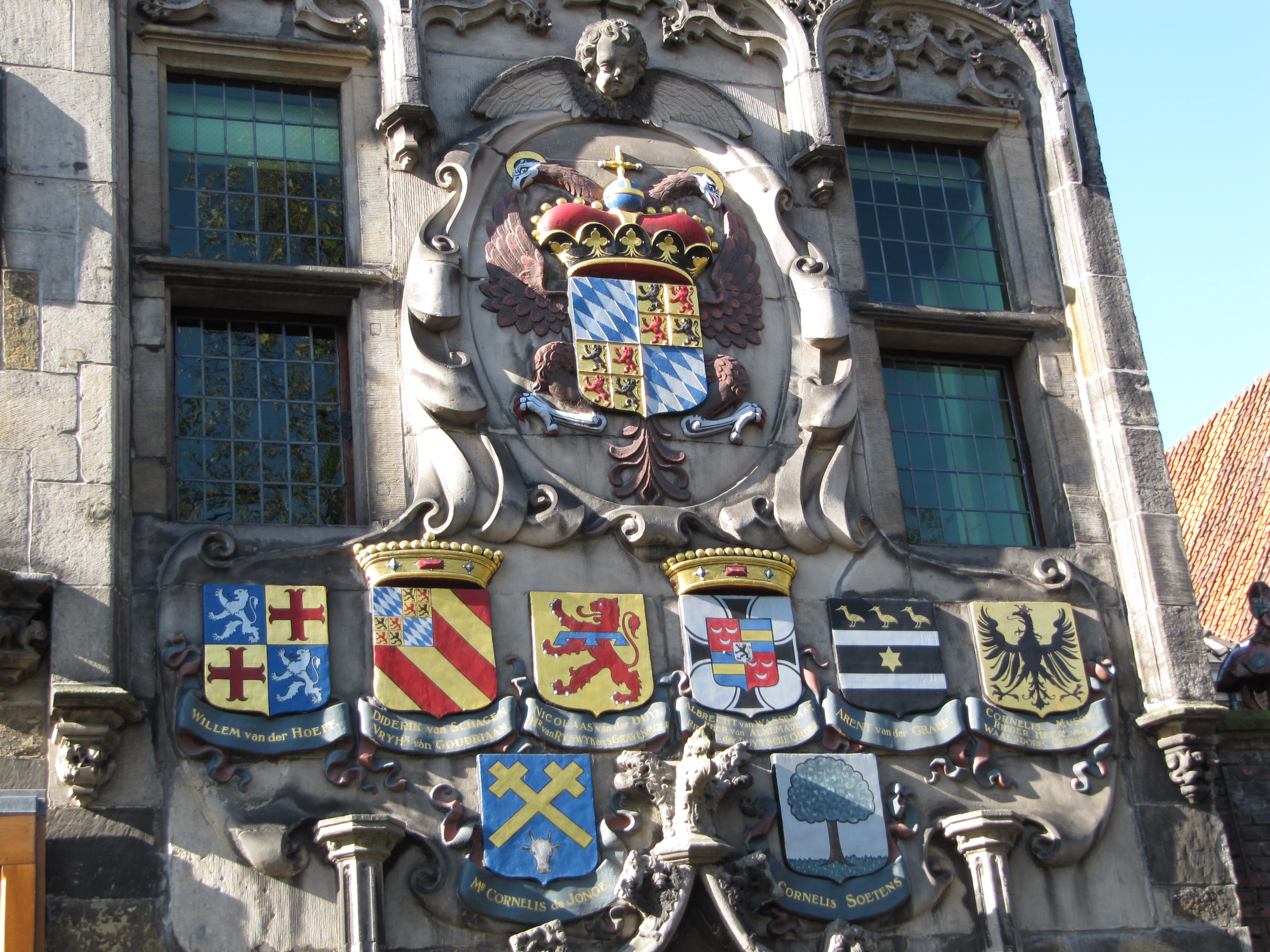
Heraldic shields of Hoogheemraadschap Delfland at façade of Gemeenlandshuis Delft, date 1645, the year this house has been bought for board administration and meetings.

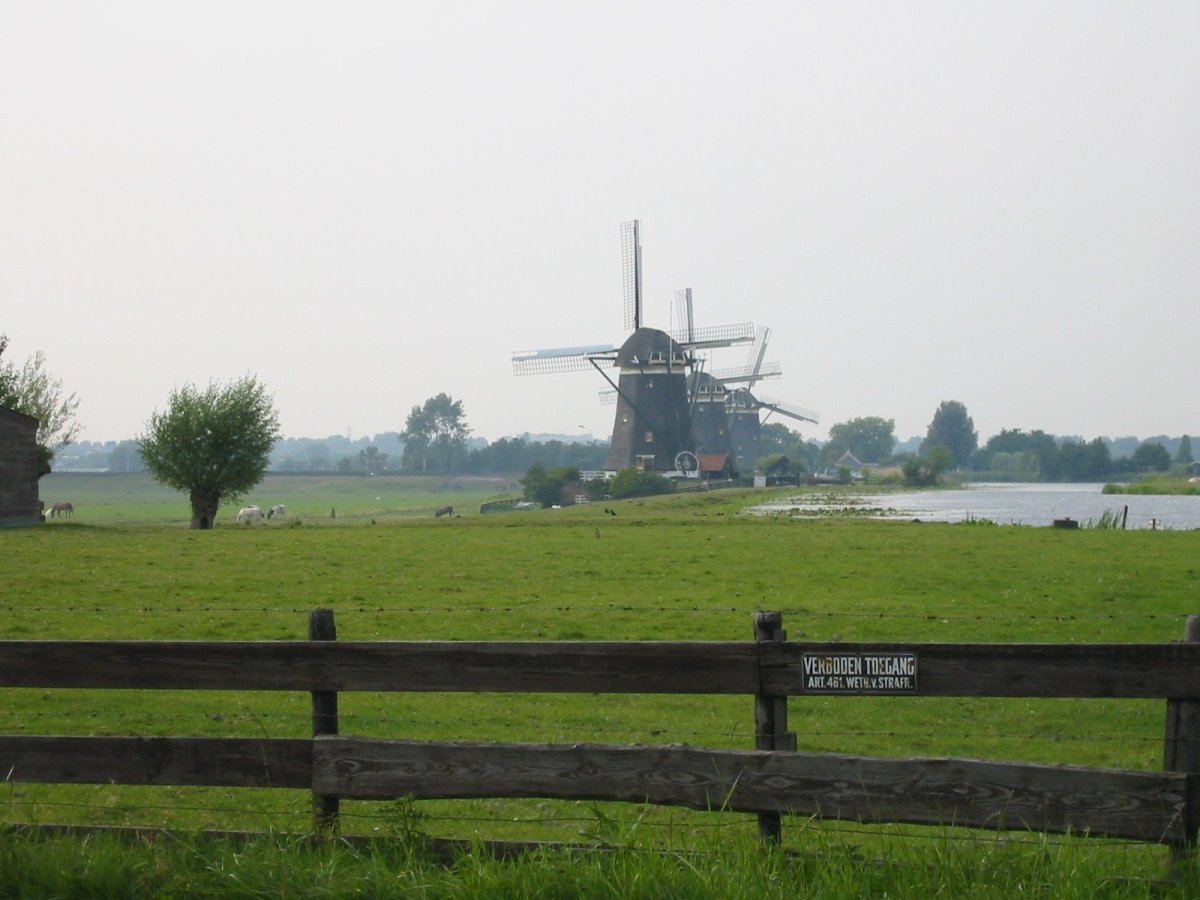
Waterpumping windmills built in 1672 at Driemanspolder near Leiden

Dikes were maintained by individuals who benefited from their existence. Every farmer was designated a part of a dike to maintain, with reviews by the water board directors. The old rule was "Whom the water harms stops the water" (Dutch: Wie het water deert, die het water keert). This meant that those living at the dike had to pay and care for it. Those people could go bankrupt from having to repair a breached dike. Those living further inland often refused to pay for or assist upkeep of dikes, even though they were just as much affected by floods. This system led to haphazard maintenance and it is believed that many floods would be prevented or mitigated if dikes had been maintained within another governing and financing system.

Punishments meted out by water boards were fines for misdemeanors such as emptying waste in the nearest canal; according to various historical documents, the death penalty was used more than once for serious offenders who threatened dike safety or water quality.

=== Later development ===
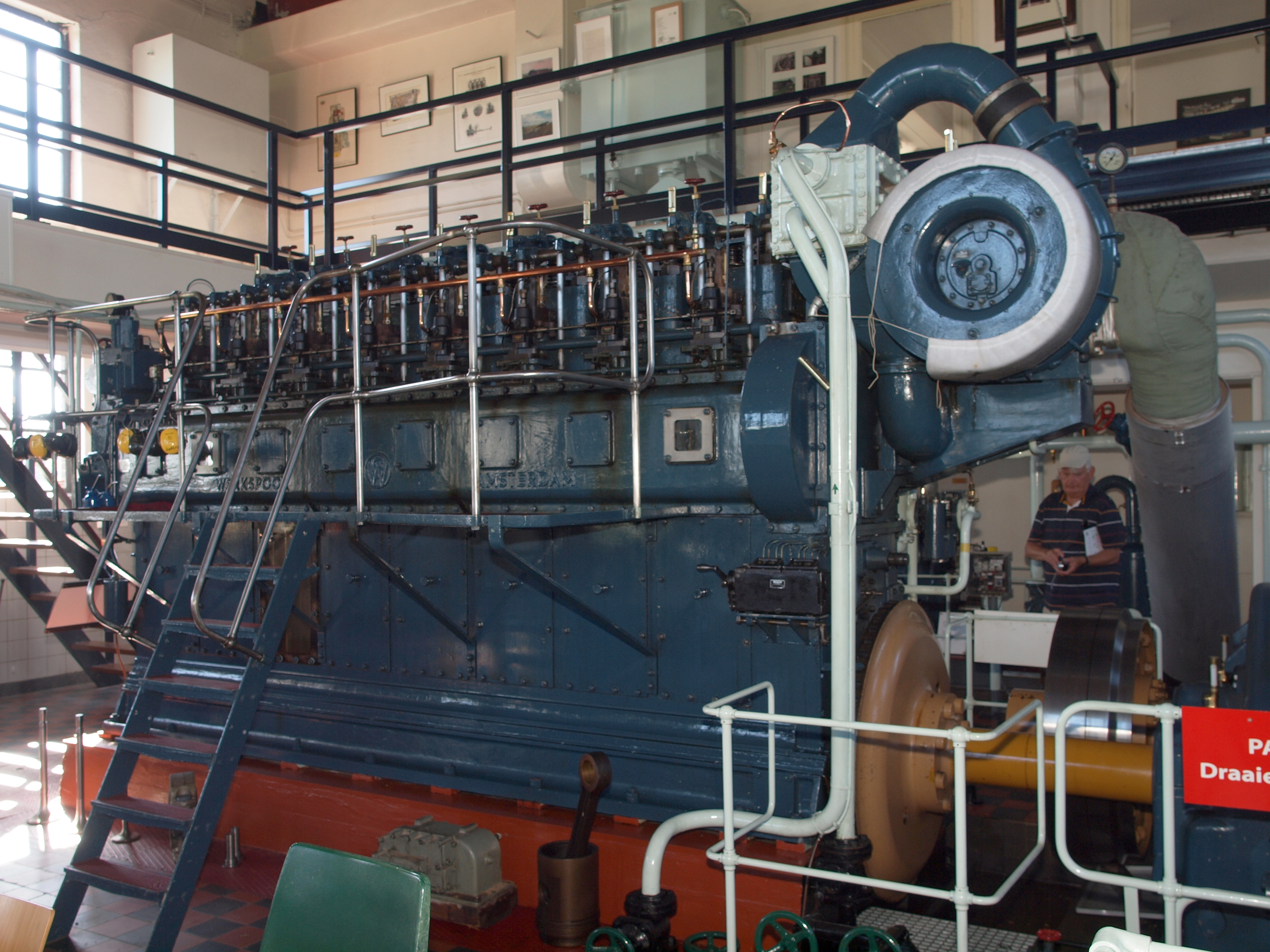
Diesel machine pump, Werkspoor, gemaal Cremer

In the 17th century there were many of these independent local bodies levying their own taxes and administering justice. This early form of local government played a role in the development of a political system in the Netherlands that was decentralised and dependent on communal cooperation. Widespread experience with decentralized government was a factor in the formation of the Dutch Republic in the 16th and 17th centuries.

The mandate of Rijkswaterstaat (English: Directorate General for Public Works and Water Management), established in 1798 under French rule, was to centralise water control in the Netherlands. Local water boards refused to give up their autonomy however, so Rijkswaterstaat ended up working alongside the local water boards. Today Rijkswaterstaat has responsibility for major water control structures and other infrastructure like bike- and motorways.

By 1850 there were about 3,500 water boards in the country. In modern times water boards merged as they dealt with joint (and sometimes conflicting) interests. Mergers eventually reduced the number to 25 water boards in 2011.

The tasks of water boards remain basically unchanged. They belong to the historically grown structure of governing bodies and are one of the oldest democratic institutions in the Netherlands. Dutch water boards have their own coat of arms, a colourful reminder of their importance in Dutch governing. The historic buildings that used to house the water boards, called gemeenlandshuis or waterschaphuis, can be found at the heart of many Dutch towns.

== Nomenclature ==
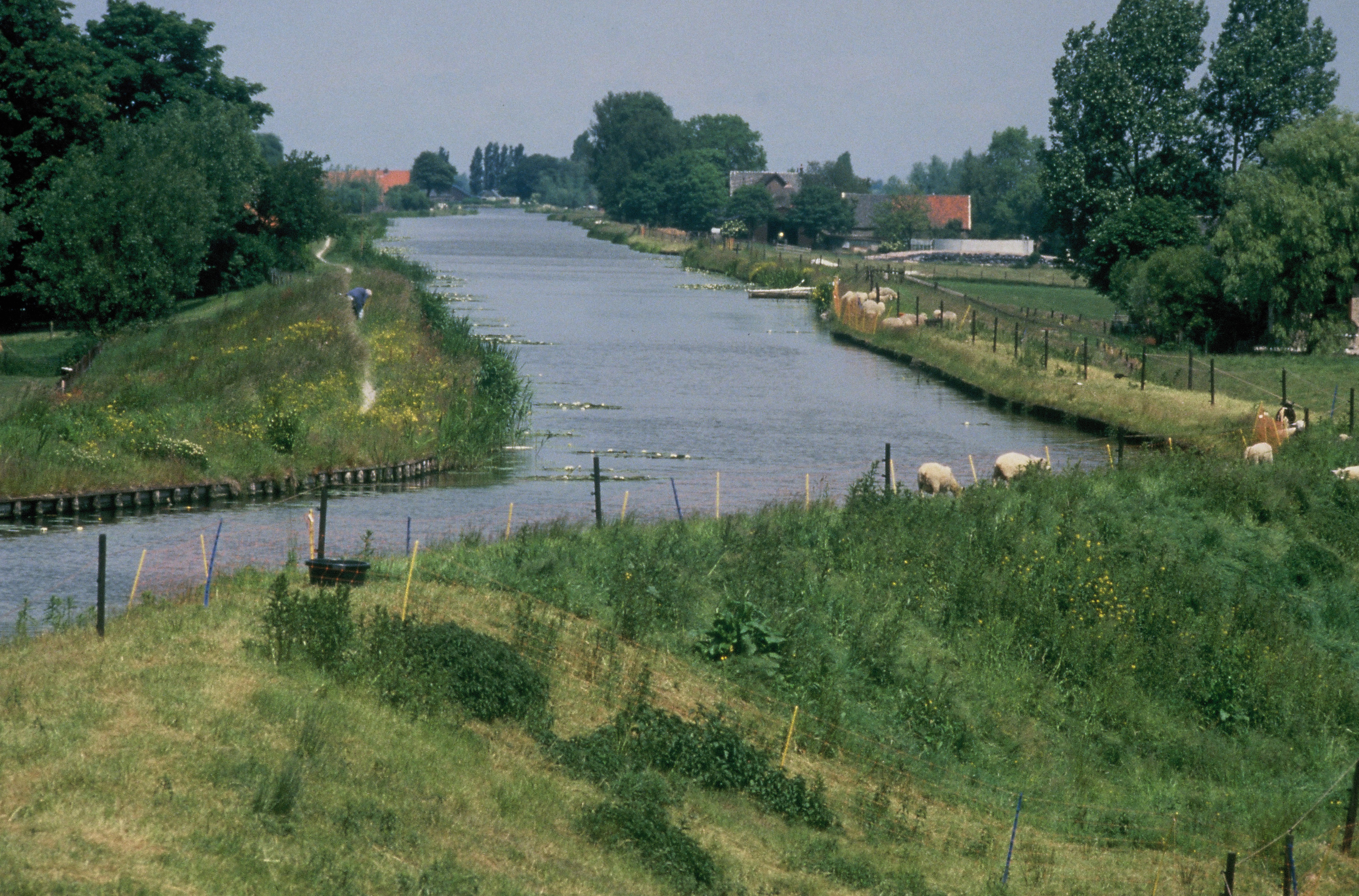
Polder drainage canal integrated in dike around polder

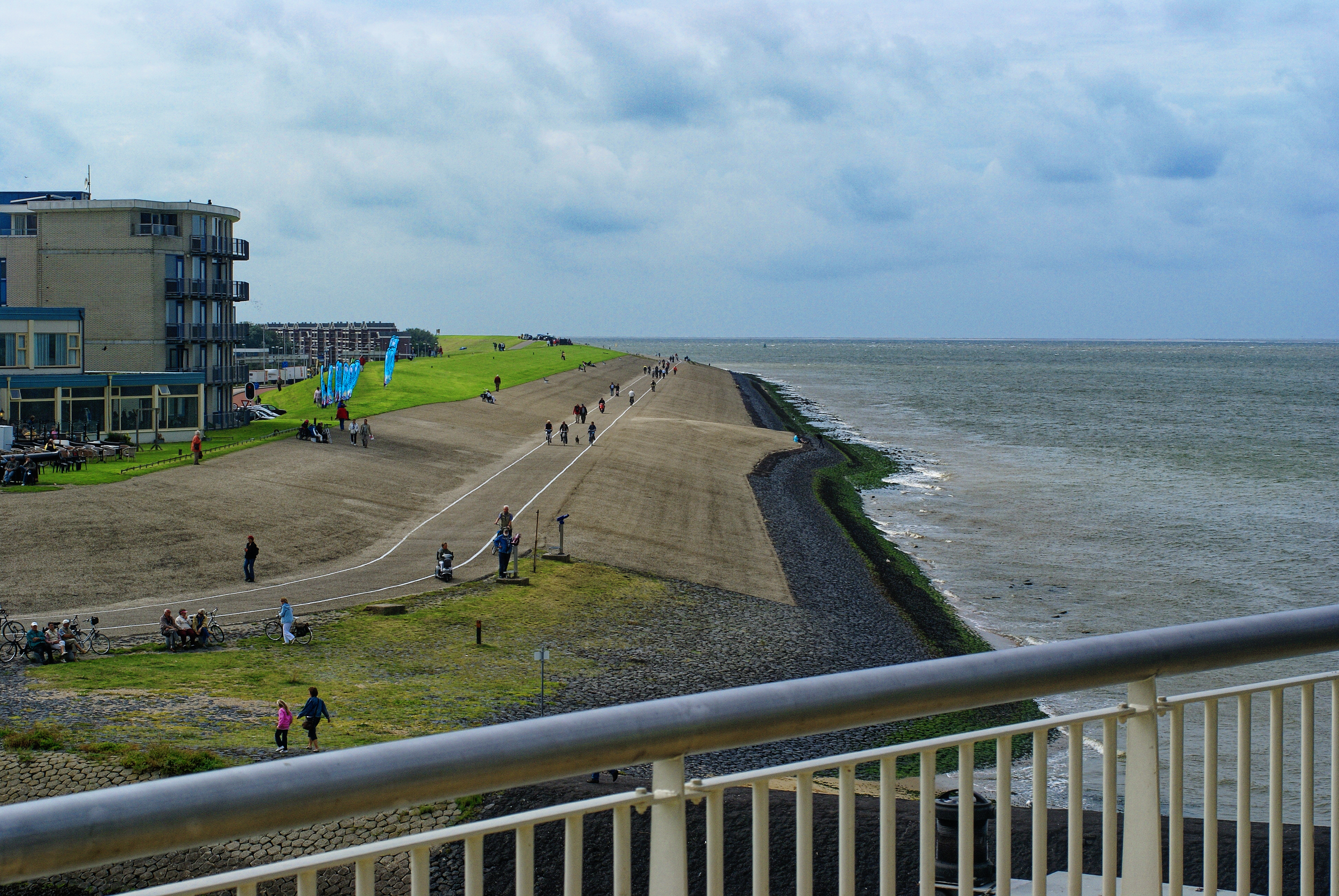
Den Helder, Seadike, View West

=== Historical terms ===
Historically, the name hoogheemraadschap was used for a large area comprising a number of smaller waterschappen within its jurisdiction. Hoogheemraadschap was also traditionally the word used for water boards located along the Rijn and the Vecht.

The term waterschap refers to the jurisdiction or to the administrative body. This also applies to hoogheemraadschap. In Dutch, the plural of waterschap is waterschappen. The plural of hoogheemraadschap is hoogheemraadschappen. In present-day usage, the official term is waterschap. However, the word hoogheemraadschap is still used by some Dutch water boards for historical reasons or when several waterschappen are grouped together into a larger regional body.

Officially there is no difference between a hoogheemraadschap and a waterschap. The Water Board Act (Waterschapswet), the Dutch statute that governs regional water authorities, only uses the word waterschap. A Dutch water board that still uses hoogheemraadschap in its name (e.g. the Hoogheemraadschap van Delfland) may have chosen to do so because hoogheemraadschap was part of the historical name. However, a waterschap that styles itself as a hoogheemraadschap no longer has its traditional structure with subordinate waterschappen, as these have been merged into the hoogheemraadschap itself. Some water boards chose the name hoogheemraadschap after a merger of a number of waterschappen into a larger one (e.g. Hoogheemraadschap De Stichtse Rijnlanden). When used in this sense, the word hoogheemraadschap refers to a large regional waterschap.

=== English translation ===
When referring to the administrative body, English translations of waterschap are "water board", "water council", "water control board", "district water board" or "regional water authority", the last word being recently adopted by the water boards as a preferred English translation on grounds that it is less ambiguous. The jurisdiction of a Dutch regional water authority is generally referred to as the "water board district" or "regional water authority district". These translations also apply to hoogheemraadschap, which is translated in the same way as waterschap.

The term "water board" or "regional water authority" may be confusing in the Dutch context, as water boards and regional water authorities in other countries are often responsible for water supply. A waterschap or hoogheemraadschap in the Netherlands is charged with the control and management of water as well as treatment of waste water, but not with water supply. In Canada (Vancouver) such a government body is also called a Regional Drainage and Sewerage District Authority with the authority often left out. Regional fresh water facilities are provided by a Regional Water District eg. Metro Vancouver Water District, Metro Vancouver Sewerage and Drainage District.

== Responsibilities ==
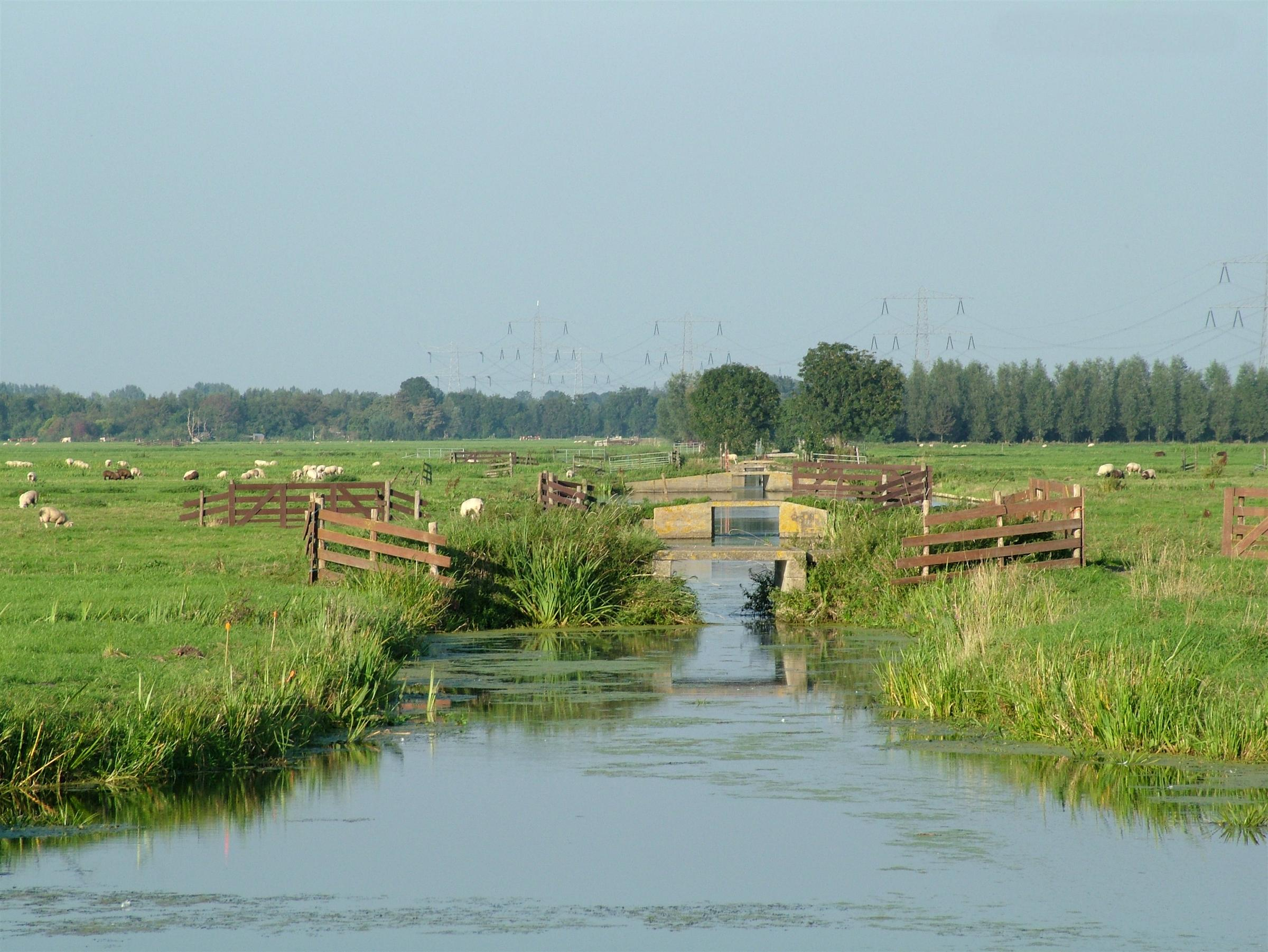
Polder landscape at 't Beijersche, southeast of Gouda

Water boards act independently from administrative governing bodies to manage the continuously needed control and improvement of the water household in the Netherlands. Water boards levy taxes to finance the work, they have the authority to penalize offenders through means of administrative measures. To control quality of surface water (canals, lakes, ponds and streams), water boards fulfill several tasks: policy making, planning and building of projects, maintenance, innovation, issuing permits (sewage discharge requires a permit) and treatment of sewage and by-products. The various municipalities within the geographic area covered by a water board are responsible for collecting sewage from households and industries, but water boards transport and treat the sewage.

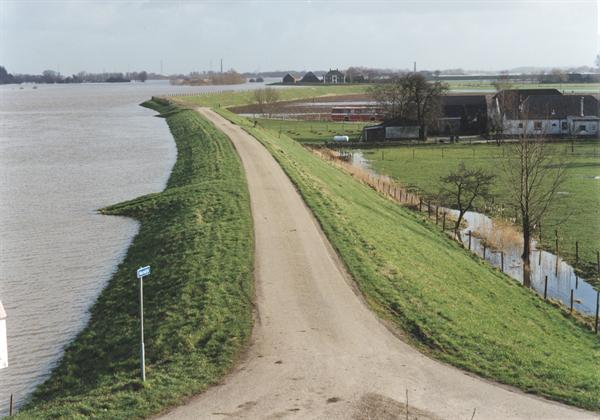
A dike along the Nederrijn between Kesteren and Opheusden. This 1995 photo was taken when river levels were high. Note the level difference to the low-lying ground behind the dike on the right.

In its territory a water board is responsible for:

- innovation, building, management and maintenance of water barriers: dunes, dikes, quays and levees;
- innovation, building, management and maintenance of water pumping systems, locks for the navigation of water;
- management and maintenance of waterways and water drainage systems;
- maintenance of a proper water level in polders and waterways;
- maintenance of surface water quality through prevention of waste-dumping and wastewater treatment.

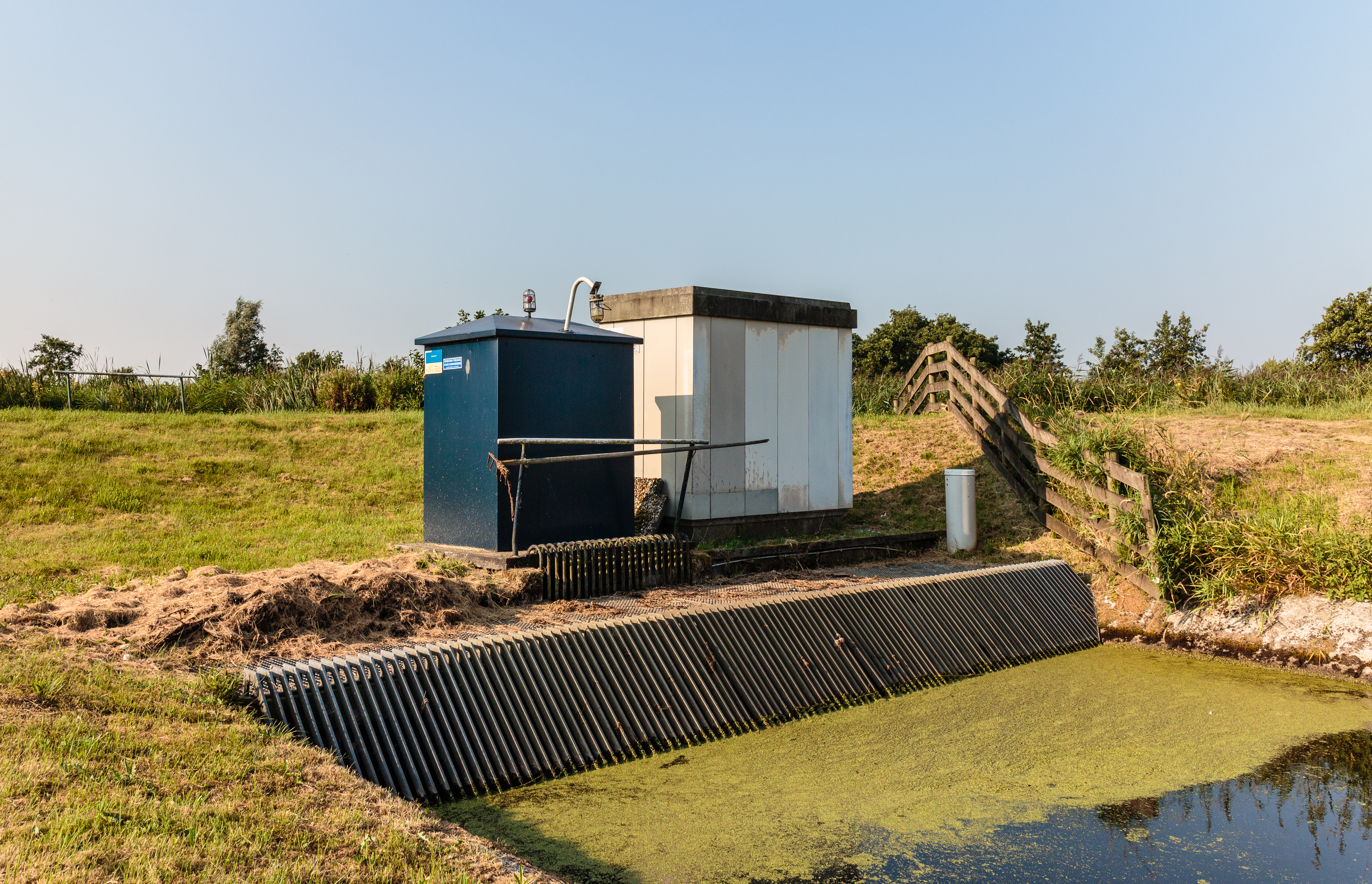
Gemaal Leijepolder, Friesland

Dutch water boards are not responsible for the water supply to the general public and are therefore not considered a utility.

In addition to taxes raised by water boards, central government contributes to their finances by paying construction and maintenance costs of water barriers and main waterways. The costs of waste water treatment are financed by a water pollution levy, which is based on the polluter pays principle.

== Governance ==
Water boards hold elections, levy taxes and function independently from other government bodies. Water board structures vary, but they each have an elected general administrative body, an executive board and a chair.

=== Hoofdingelanden ===
Most of the members of the general administrative body of the water boards (the hoofdingelanden) are elected democratically, although some stakeholders (e.g. agrarian interests) may have the power to appoint members. Members of the general administrative body are elected for a period of four years.

The constituencies of members of the general administrative body are the various categories of stakeholders: landholders, leaseholders, owners of buildings, companies and all residents. The nature of the interest and financial contribution are factors in determining how many representatives each category may have on the water board.

=== (Hoog)heemraden ===
The general administrative body elects some of its own members to sit on the executive board, called the college van dijkgraaf en heemraden. Except for the chairperson (the dijkgraaf, see below) these executive board members, called heemraden or hoogheemraden in Dutch, represent five types of stake holders: local residents, industry (factories and industrial buildings), municipalities (urban areas), farmers and land-owners of agricultural land, and natureconservation parks.

=== Dijkgraaf ===
Each water board is headed by a chair (dijkgraaf, literally: "dike count", but sometimes called "dike reeve" or "dike warden" in English). The chair is appointed by the king on the recommendation of the board for a period of six years. The chair presides over the executive board and the general administrative body and has certain ceremonial duties as well. The chair of a water board is at the same level as a mayor in municipality government and a king's commissioner in provincial government.

== List of water boards ==
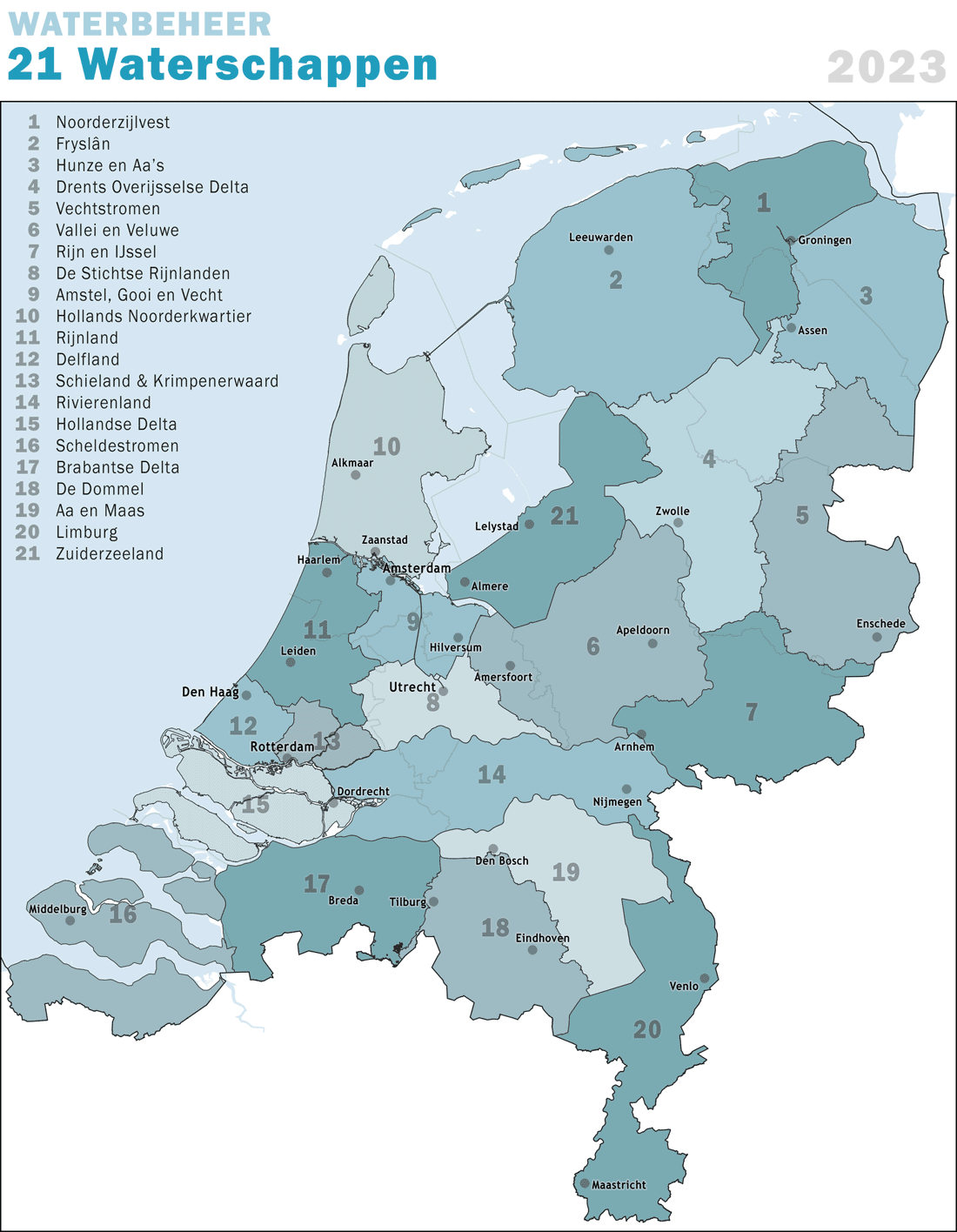
The 21 water boards in the Netherlands in 2023

Typically, a water board's territory is made up of one or more polders or watersheds. The territory of a water board generally covers several municipalities and may include areas located in two or more provinces. As of 2018, there are 21 water boards in the Netherlands.

1. Waterschap Noorderzijlvest (Groningen, Friesland and Drenthe)
2. Wetterskip Fryslân (Friesland and Groningen)
3. Waterschap Hunze en Aa's (Groningen and Drenthe)
4. Waterschap Drents Overijsselse Delta (Drenthe and Overijssel)
5. Waterschap Vechtstromen (Drenthe and Overijssel)
6. Waterschap Vallei en Veluwe (Utrecht and Gelderland)
7. Waterschap Rijn en IJssel (Gelderland)
8. Hoogheemraadschap De Stichtse Rijnlanden (Utrecht and South Holland)
9. Waterschap Amstel, Gooi en Vecht (North Holland, Utrecht and South Holland)
10. Hoogheemraadschap Hollands Noorderkwartier (North Holland)
11. Hoogheemraadschap van Rijnland (South Holland and North Holland)
12. Hoogheemraadschap van Delfland (South Holland)
13. Hoogheemraadschap van Schieland en de Krimpenerwaard (South Holland)
14. Waterschap Rivierenland (South Holland, Gelderland, Utrecht and North Brabant)
15. Waterschap Hollandse Delta (South Holland)
16. Waterschap Scheldestromen (Zeeland)
17. Waterschap Brabantse Delta (North Brabant)
18. Waterschap De Dommel (North Brabant)
19. Waterschap Aa en Maas (North Brabant)
20. Waterschap Limburg (Limburg)
21. Waterschap Zuiderzeeland (Flevoland)

== Elections ==
Anyone who is aged 18 or over and is registered with a local authority in the Netherlands can vote in the water board elections, which are held every four years on the same day as the provincial elections. Prior to the vote, the local council mails each voter a list of candidates, a ballot paper and details of their local polling stations.

== Unie van Waterschappen ==
The Unie van Waterschappen (the union of Dutch regional water authorities, referring to itself as Dutch Water Authorities) promotes the interests of Dutch water boards at a national and international level. All 21 water boards are member of this association. The Unie van Waterschappen acts collaboratively with other appropriate bodies or institutions to pursue the Association's objectives. It is a member of the European Union of Water Management Associations (EUWMA).

== See also ==
- Floods in the Netherlands
