= Design museum =

Type of museum

A design museum is a museum with a focus on product, industrial, graphic, fashion and architectural design. Many design museums were founded as museums for applied arts or decorative arts and started only in the late 20th century to collect design.

The first museum of this kind was the Victoria and Albert Museum in London. In Germany the first museum of decorative arts was the Deutsches-Gewerbe-Museum zu Berlin (now Kunstgewerbemuseum), founded in 1868 in Berlin.

Also some museums of contemporary or modern art have important design collections, such as the MoMA in New York and the Centre Pompidou in Paris. A special concept has been realised in the Pinakothek der Moderne in Munich, in which four independent museums cooperate, one of them being Die Neue Sammlung – the largest design museum in the world.

Today corporate museums like the Vitra Design Museum, Museo Alessi or Museo Kartell play an important role, both through purpose-built collections as well as the display of archival records, drawings, prototypes, samples, and other historical artefacts.

== List of design museums ==
- 21 21 Design Sight, Tokyo, Japan
- ADI Design Museum, Milan, Italy
- Architecture & Design Museum, Helsinki, Finland
- Archivo Diseño y Arquitectura, Mexico City
- Art, Design & Architecture Museum (AD&A), University of California, Santa Barbara, Goleta, California
- Bauhaus Archive, Berlin, Germany
- Bröhan Museum, Berlin, Germany
- Chicago Athenaeum, Galena, Illinois, USA
- Cooper Hewitt, Smithsonian Design Museum, New York, USA
- Danish Museum of Art & Design, Copenhagen, Denmark
- Design Exchange, Toronto, Canada
- Design Museum Brussels (former Art & Design Atomium Museum), Belgium
- Design Museum Dedel, Den Haag, Netherlands
- Design Museum Den Bosch, Netherlands
- Design Museum Dharavi, India
- Design Museum Gent, Belgium
- Design Museum Holon, Tel Aviv, Israel
- Design Museum, London, UK
- Design Museum of Barcelona, Spain
- Design Museum of Chicago, Chicago, USA
- Design Museum of Thessaloniki, Greece
- Die Neue Sammlung, Munich, Germany
- Dongdaemun Design Plaza, Seoul, South Korea
- Estonian Museum of Applied Art and Design, Tallinn, Estonia
- Het Nieuwe Instituut, Rotterdam, Netherlands
- HKDI Gallery (Hong Kong Design Institute), Hong Kong
- Icelandic Museum of Design and Applied Art, Garðabær, Iceland
- International Design Centre, Nagoya, Japan
- Kunstgewerbemuseum Berlin, Germany
- Kunstmuseen Krefeld, Krefeld, Germany
- Leipzig Museum of Applied Arts, Germany
- Ljubljana Museum of Architecture and Design, Slovenia
- M+ Museum, Hong Kong
- Mobile Phone Museum
- Montreal Museum of Fine Arts
- Musée Ariana, Geneva, Switzerland
- Musée des Arts Décoratifs, Paris, France
- Musée des Arts Décoratifs et du Design, Bordeaux, France
- Musée des Arts et Métiers, Paris, France
- Museo del Design del Friuli Venezia Giulia (MuDeFri), Italy (online only)
- Museo del Objeto del Objeto, Mexico City
- Museo Nacional de Artes Decorativas, Madrid, Spain
- Museum dan Rumah Desain Runa, Bali, Indonesia
- Museum für angewandte Kunst (MAK), Frankfurt, Germany
- Museum für angewandte Kunst Cologne (MAKK), Germany
- Museum für angewandte Kunst (MAK), Vienna, Austria
- Museum für Gestaltung Zürich, Switzerland
- Museum für Kunst und Gewerbe Hamburg, Germany
- Museum of Applied Arts, Belgrade, Serbia
- Museum of Applied Arts, Budapest, Hungary
- Museum of Art, Architecture and Technology (MAAT), Lisbon, Portugal
- Museum of Arts and Design (MAD), New York, USA
- Museum of Contemporary Design and Applied Arts (MUDAC), Lausanne, Switzerland
- Museum of Craft and Design (MCD), San Francisco, US
- Museum of Decorative Arts in Prague, Czech Republic
- Museum of Design Atlanta, Atlanta, Georgia, USA
- Museum of Design in Plastics (MoDiP), Arts University Bournemouth, Poole, UK
- Museum of Domestic Design and Architecture, London, UK
- Museum of Failure, travelling physical exhibition and online collection
- Museum of Furniture Studies (Möbeldesignmuseum), Älmhult, Sweden
- Museum of the American Arts & Crafts Movement, St. Petersburg, Florida, USA
- National Museum of Art, Architecture and Design, Oslo, Norway
- Powerhouse Museum, Sydney, Australia
- Red Dot Design Museum, Essen, Germany
- Red Dot Design Museum (Singapore)
- Röhsska Museum, Gothenburg, Sweden
- Singapore City Gallery, Singapore
- SONS Museum, a museum dedicated to shoe design, Kruishoutem, Belgium
- Staatliche Kunstsammlungen Dresden (SKD), Germany
- Stedelijk Museum, Amsterdam, Netherlands
- Stedelijk Museum, Breda, Netherlands
- Stieglitz Museum of Applied Arts, Saint Petersburg, Russia
- Swedish Centre for Architecture and Design, Stockholm, Sweden
- Swedish Design Museum, Sweden (online only)
- The National Centre for Craft & Design, Sleaford, Lincolnshire, UK
- Taiwan Design Museum, Taipei, Taiwan
- Triennale di Milano, Milan, Italy
- Victoria and Albert Museum (V&A), London, UK
- V&A Dundee, Dundee, Scotland, UK
- V&A East (V&A East Museum and V&A East Storehouse), London, UK
- V&A Wedgwood Collection in Barlaston, UK
- Vitra Design Museum, Weil am Rhein, Germany
- Wolfsonian-FIU, Miami Beach, Florida, USA
- Z33 House for Contemporary Art, Hasselt, Belgium
