= TDRI =

The initialism TDRI may refer to:

- Taiwan Design Research Institute, art organization
- Thailand Development Research Institute, non-profit non-government
- Total Drama: Revenge of the Island, fourth season of Total Drama
