= Weigh House (Leiden) =

Coordinates: 52.1594°N 4.4904°E

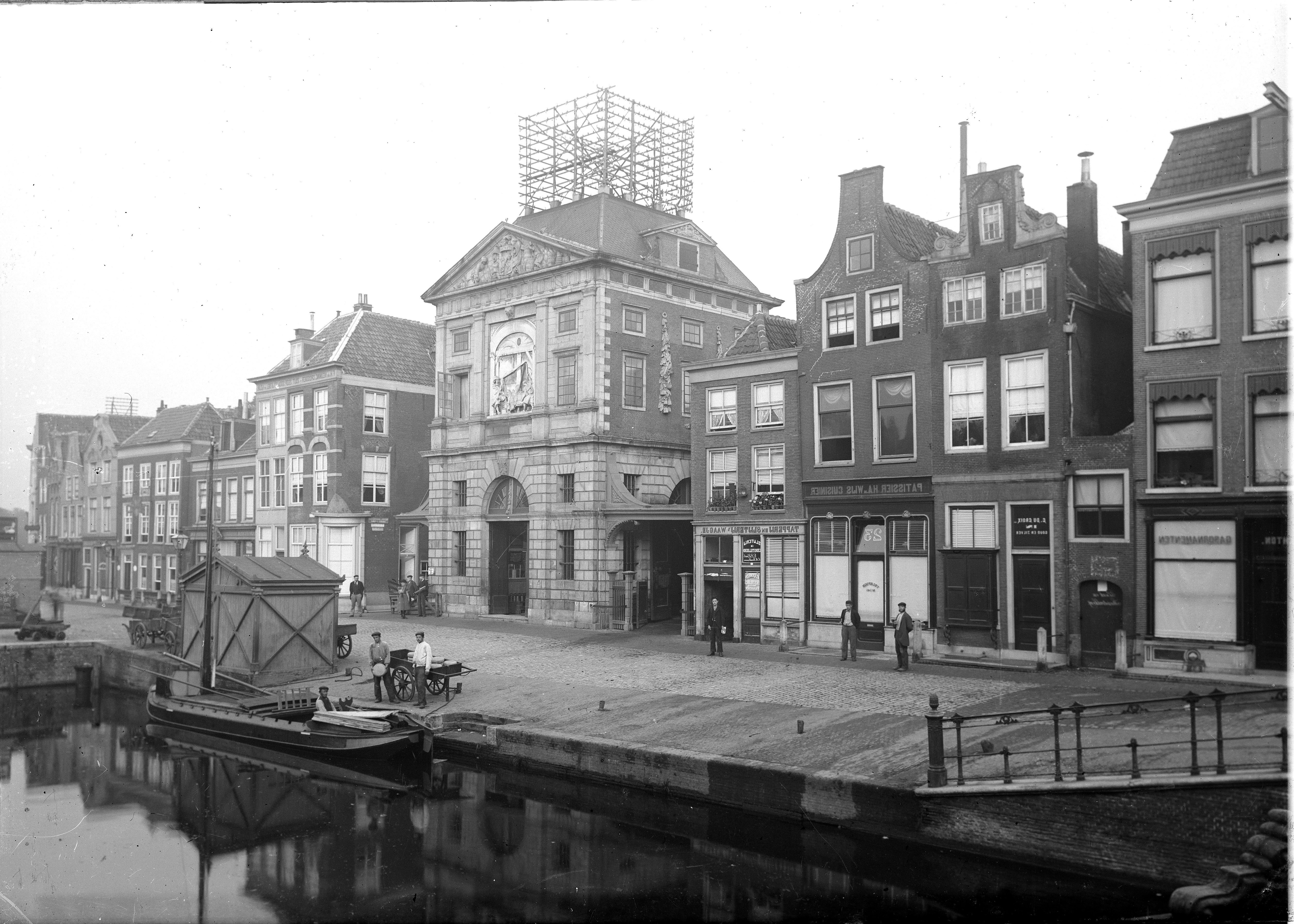
View of the Weigh House. Photo is mirror reversed.

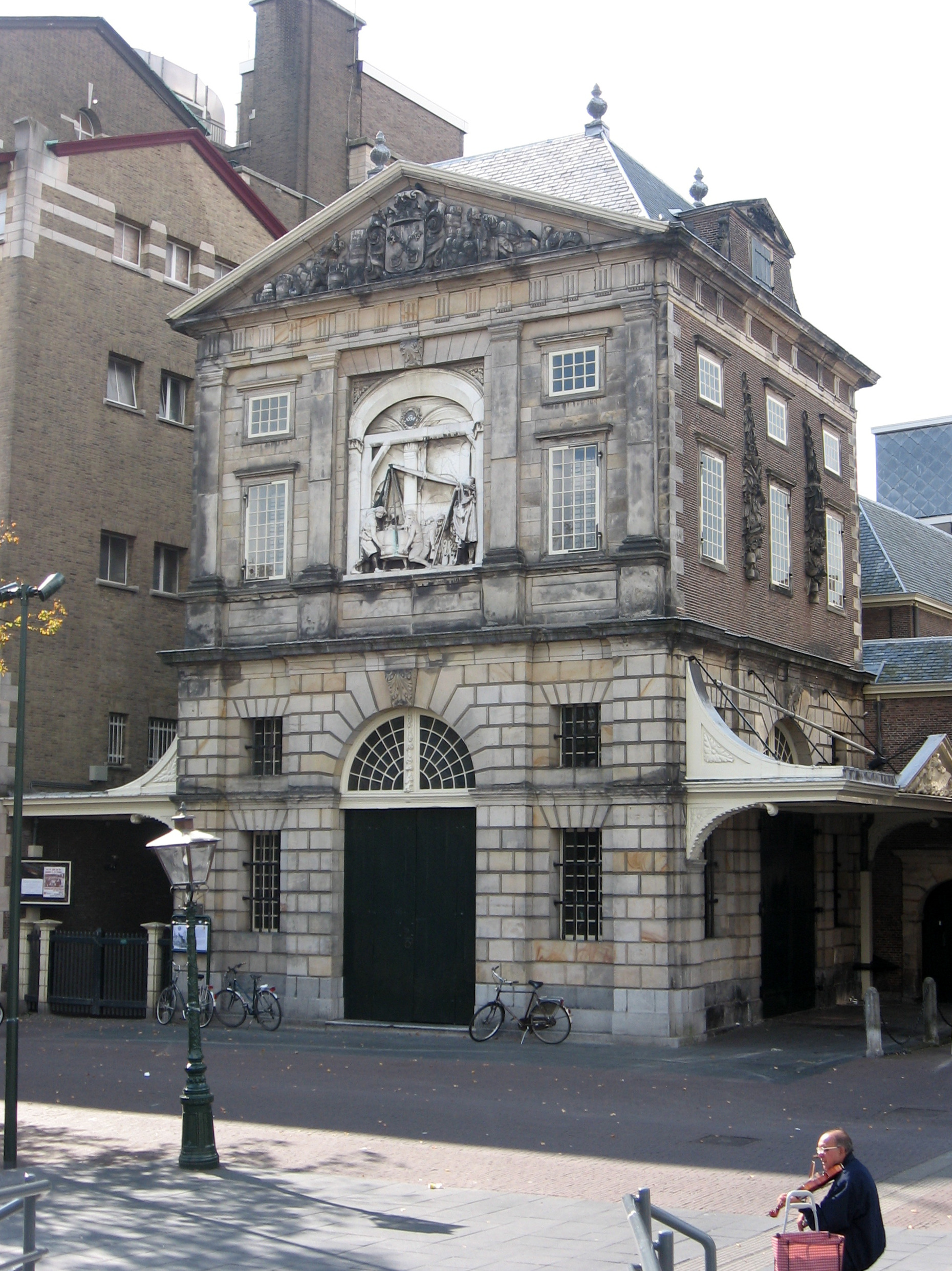
Leiden: De Waag

The Leiden Weigh House (De Waag in Dutch) is a Rijksmonument located on Aalmarkt street (nr. 21).

It was designed by Pieter Post around 1657 and opened in 1659. For centuries, merchants came here to weigh and trade a variety of goods. In addition to being a weigh house, the Leiden Weigh House has hosted a variety of engagements and stately celebrations over the centuries. Notably, Govert Bidloo converted an attic room into an autopsy room to study the human body.

The weigh house was in use as an actual weigh house until 1972, when the last unit of cheese was sold. Nowadays, the building serves as a cultural monument and also houses a bar and restaurant.
