= Songshan Cultural and Creative Park =

Event venue in Xinyi, Taipei, Taiwan

Coordinates: 25°02′37″N 121°33′45″E

- 松山文創園區
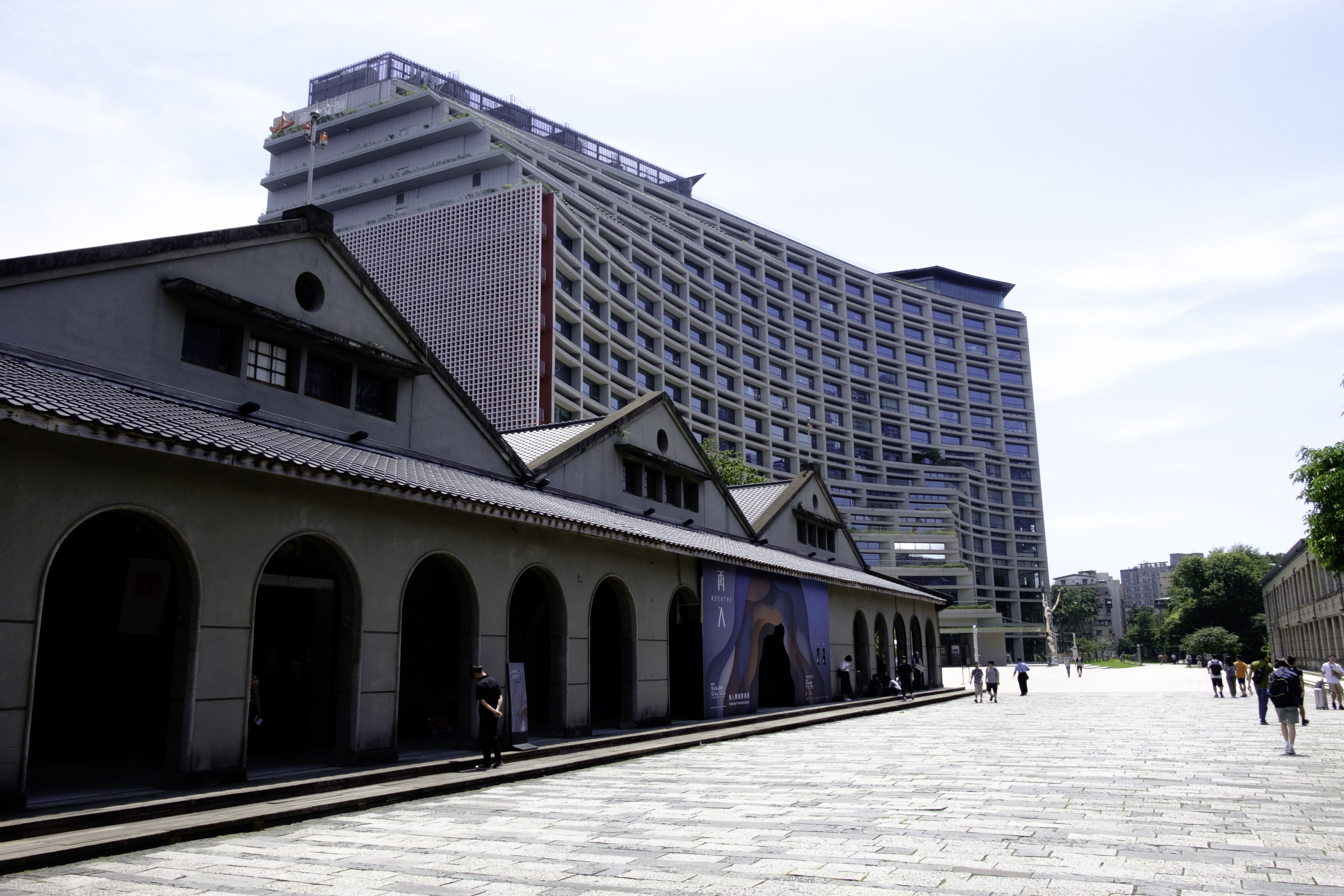

General information
- Location: Xinyi, Taipei, Taiwan
- Completed: 1937 (as Matsuyama Tobacco Plant); 2011 (as Songshan Cultural and Creative Park)

Technical details
- Floor area: 6.6 hectares

Other information
- Public transit: Taipei Metro: Sun Yat-sen Memorial Hall

Website
- Official website

The Songshan Cultural and Creative Park (SSCC; traditional Chinese: 松山文創園區; simplified Chinese: 松山文创园区; pinyin: Sōngshān Wénchuàng Yuánqū) is a multifunctional park in Xinyi District, Taipei, Taiwan.

== History ==
The park was initially constructed in 1937 as a tobacco factory under the name Matsuyama Tobacco Plant of the Monopoly Bureau of the Taiwan Governor's Office (臺灣總督府專賣局松山菸草工場) under the Japanese government. After Japan ceded Taiwan in 1945, the Taiwan Provincial Monopoly Bureau took over the factory and renamed it as the Songshan Tobacco Plant of the Taiwan Provincial Monopoly Bureau. In 1947, the plant was renamed again as Songshan Tobacco Plant of the Taiwan Tobacco and Wine Bureau.

The factory ceased to produce cigarettes in 1998 for concern over urban planning, tobacco and liquor marketing regulatory changes and the decline in tobacco demand.

In 2001, the Taipei City Government designated the defunct tobacco factory as Taipei's 99th historic site. Inspired with approaches like Shanghai's 50 Moganshan to turning industrial spaces into cultural centers, the city government converted the factory into a park comprising city-designated historic sites, historical structures and architectural highlights.

On November 15, 2011, the former factory was officially opened to the public as a creative park to provide venues for diverse cultural and creative exhibitions and performances. Together with Taipei Dome, the site is known as Taipei Cultural and Sporting Complex.

== Features ==
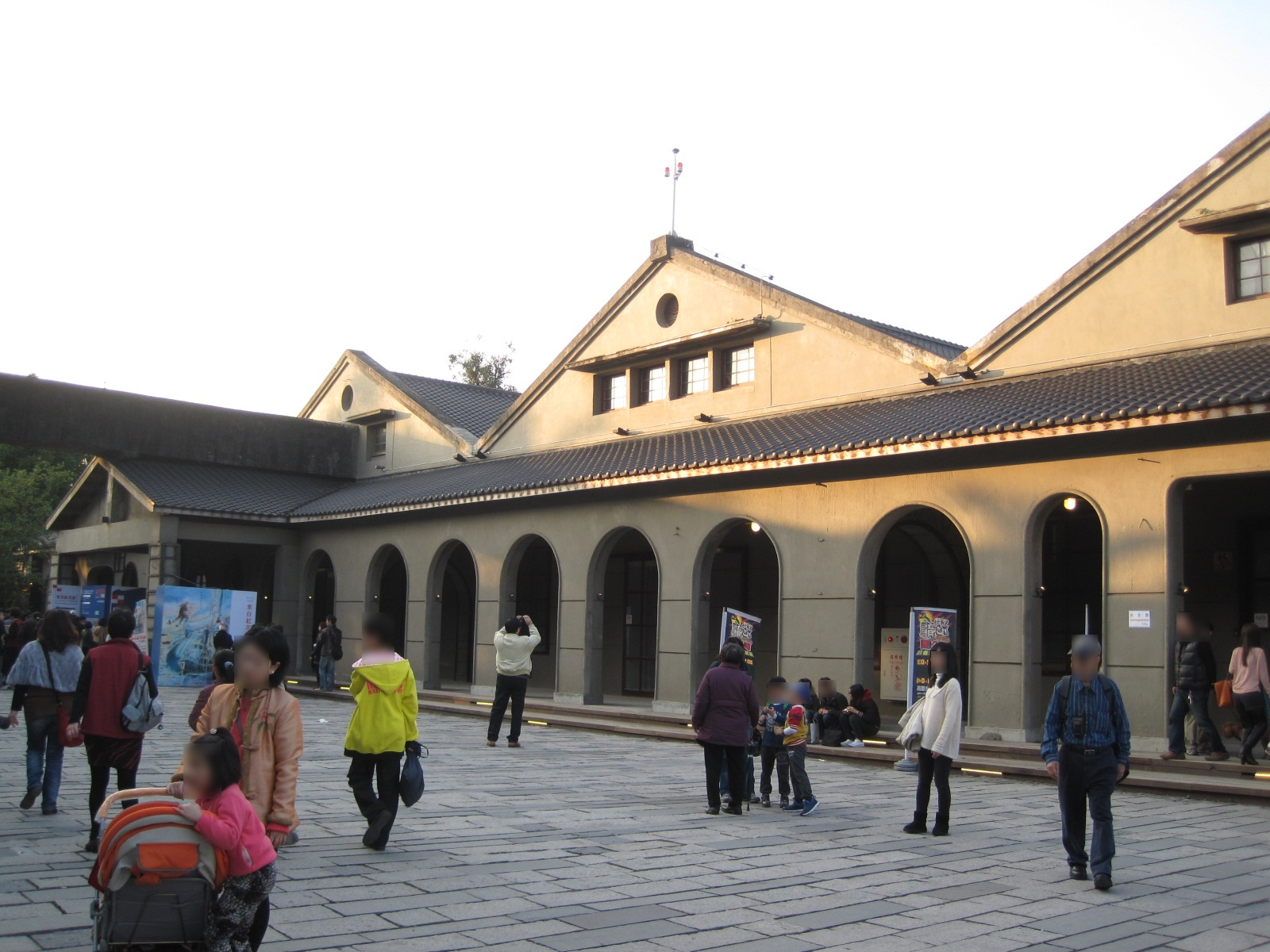
Warehouses (No. 1-5)

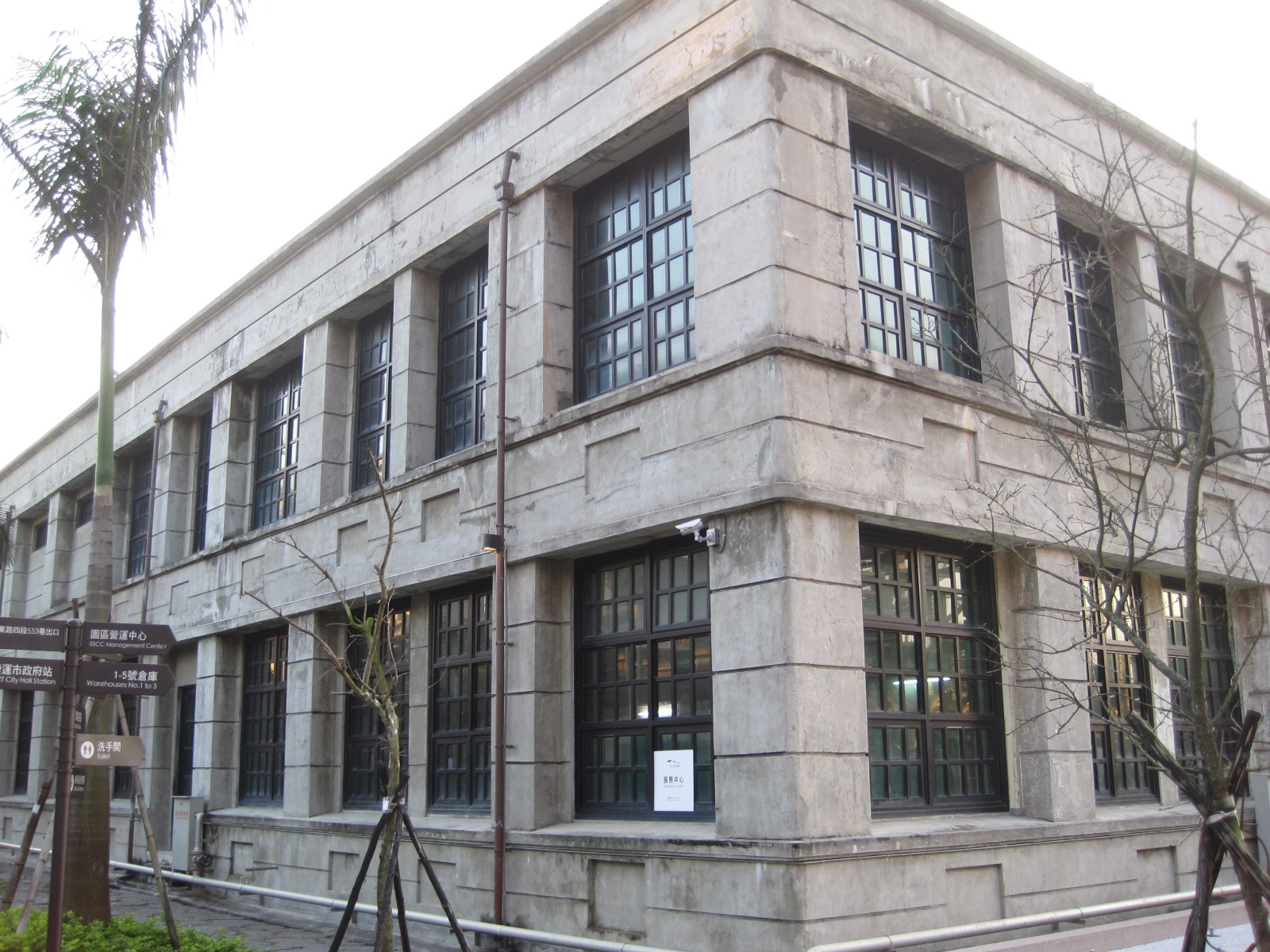
Tobacco Factory (North, South, East)

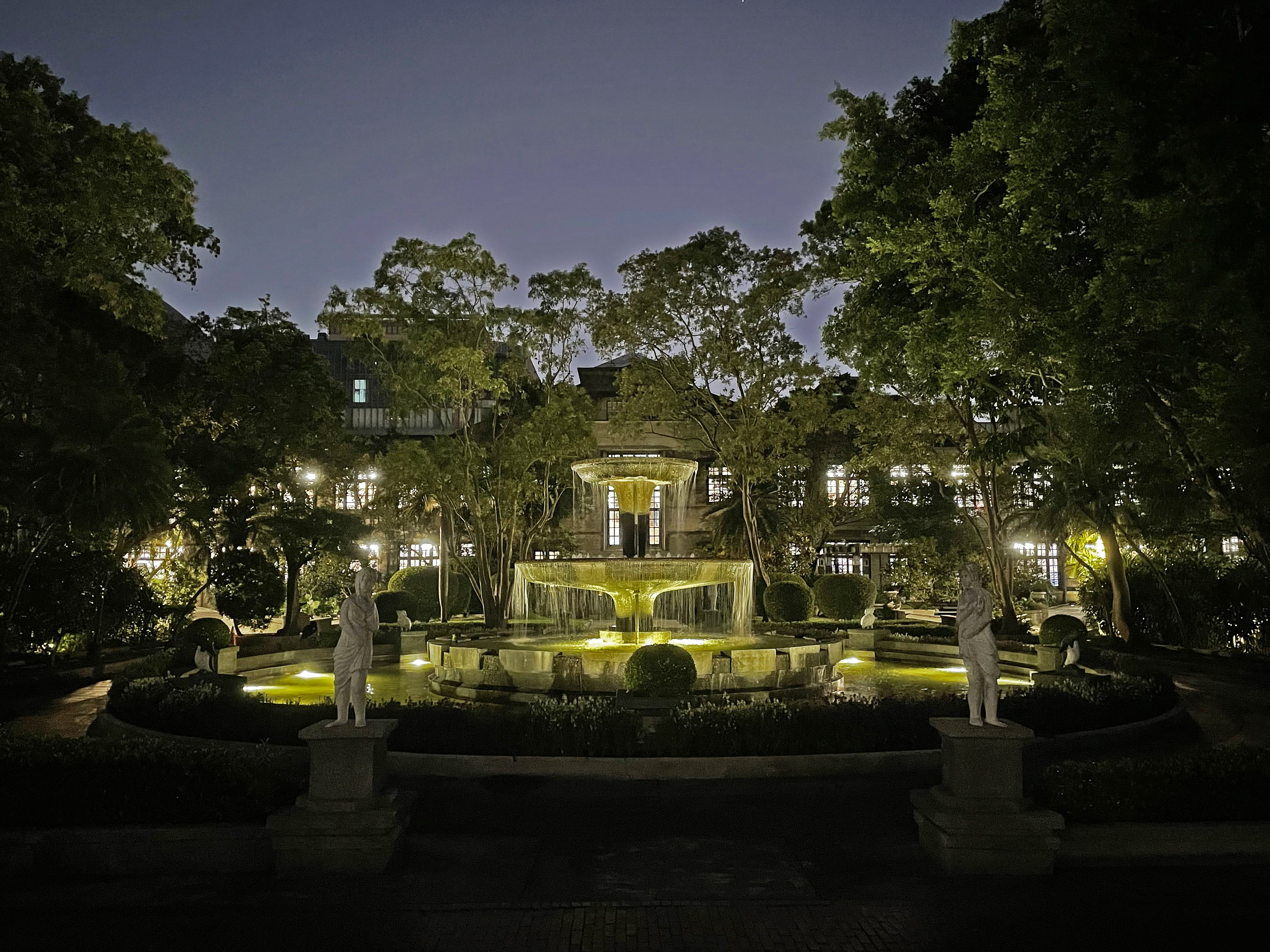
Baroque Garden

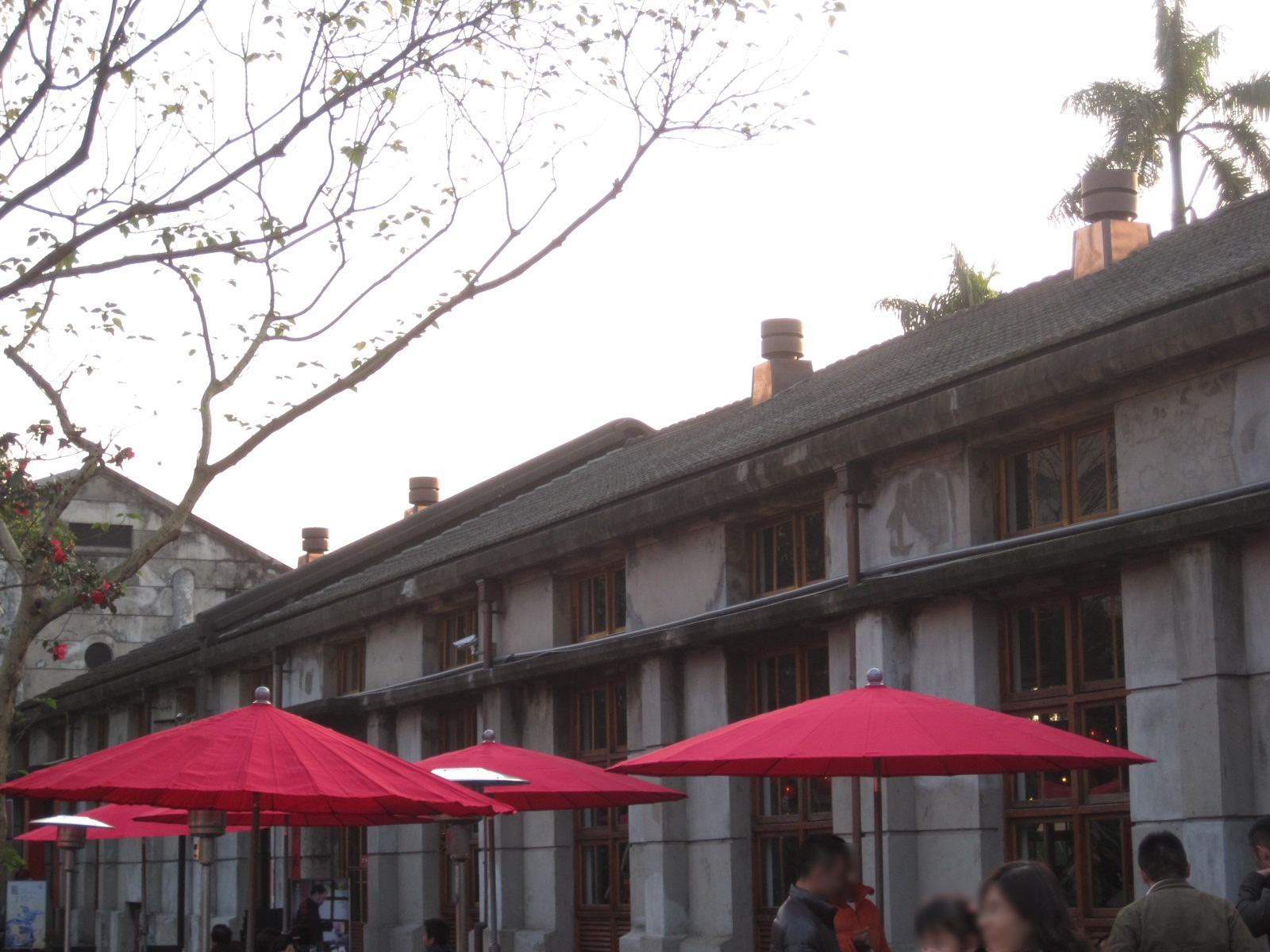
TMSK Restaurant

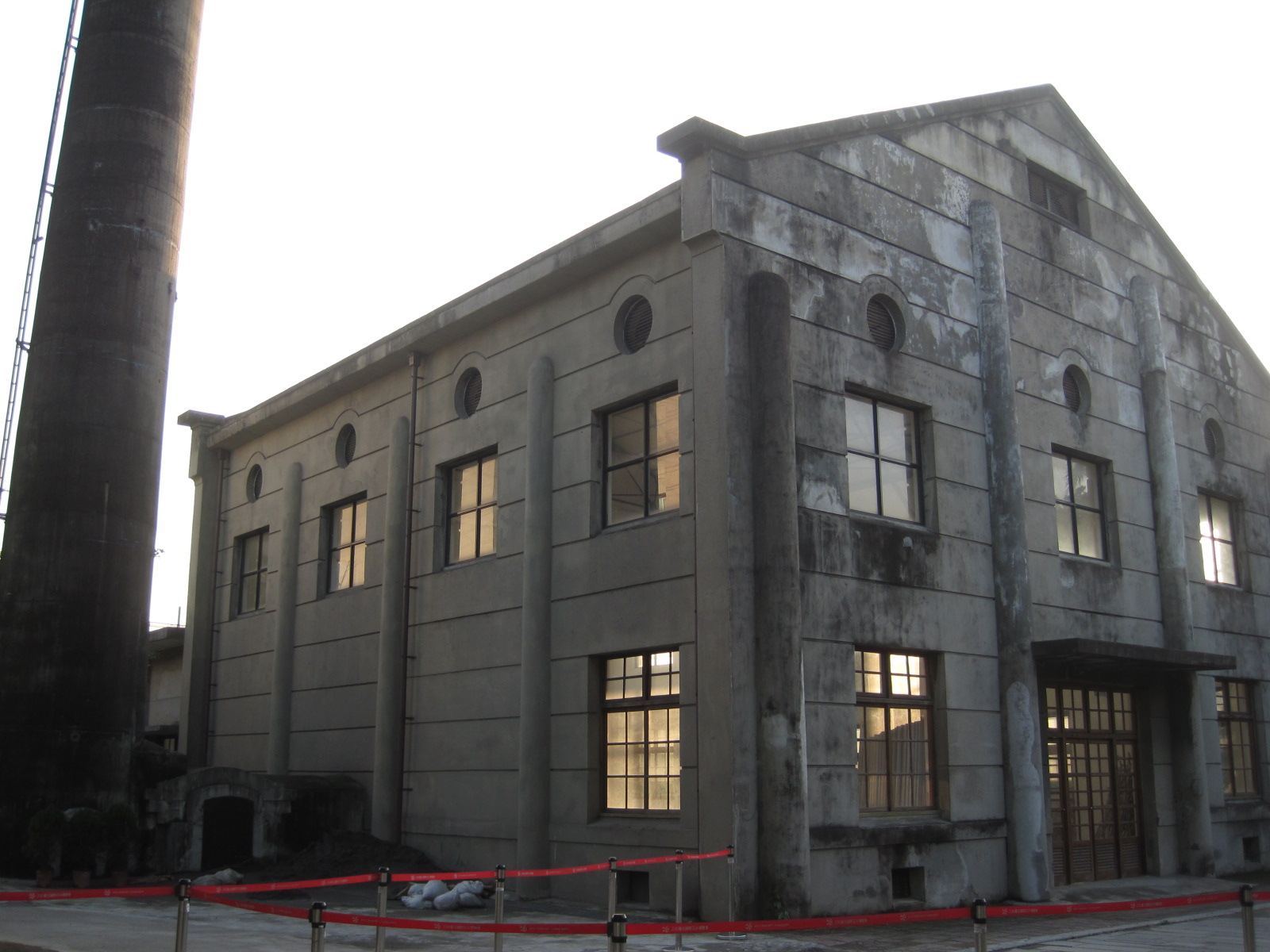
Boiler Room

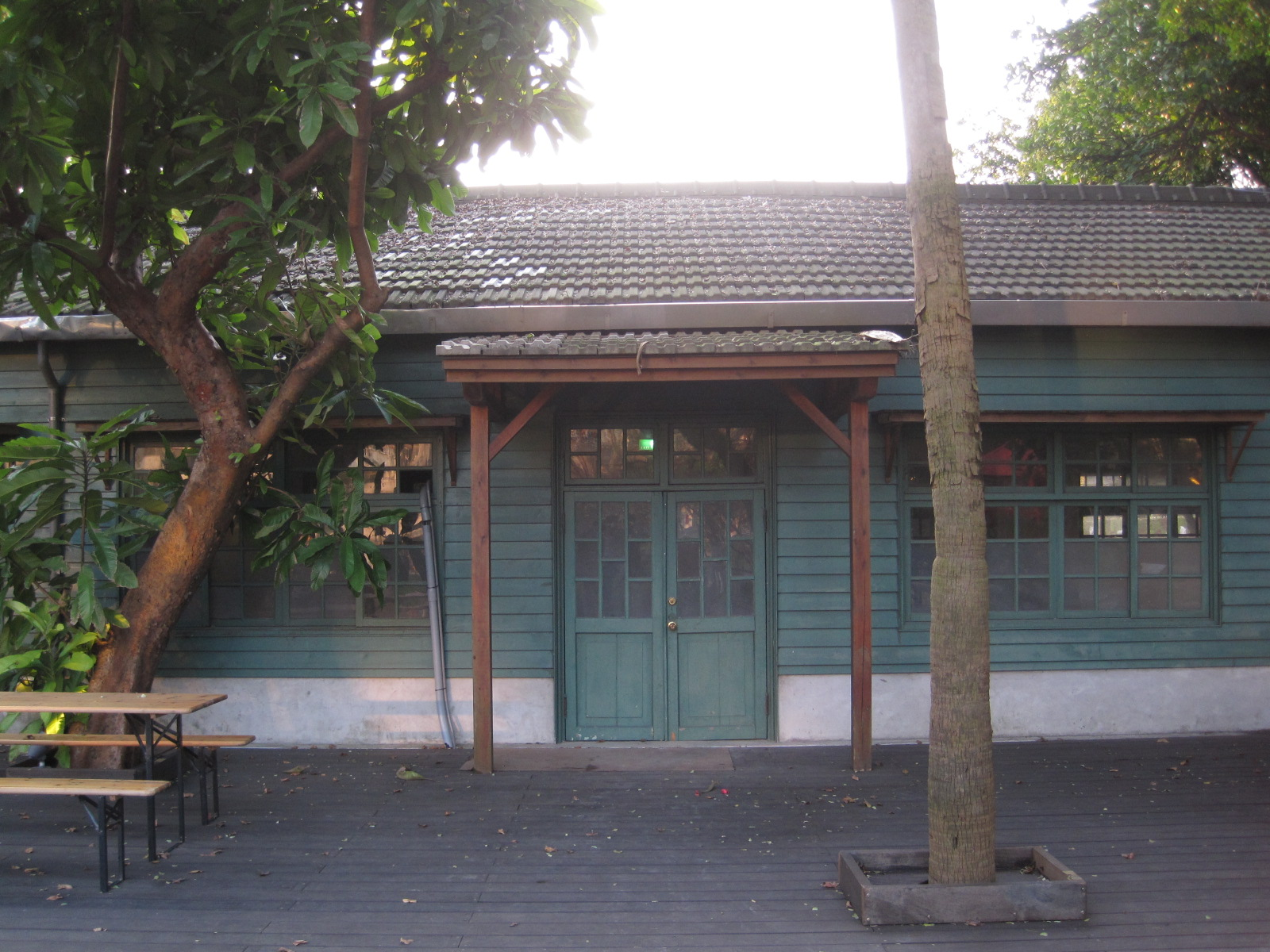
Nursery Room

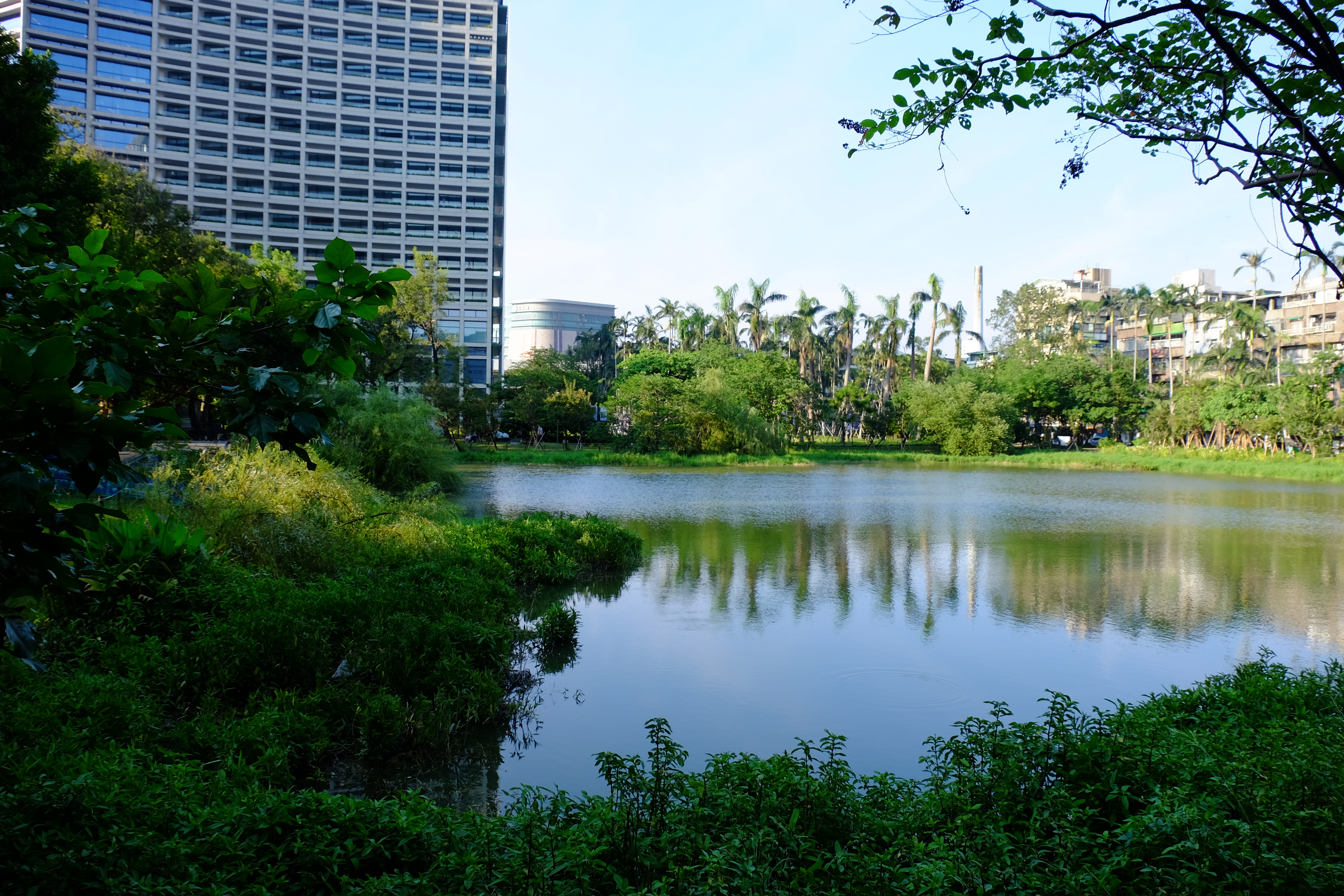
Ecology Pond

=== Warehouses ===
There are five warehouses, from number 1 until 5. The workers manufactured cigarettes on the second floor of the plant. After packaging the rolled cigarettes, the boxes were sent directly to warehouse no. 2 using conveyor channel, through the turntable, directed to the platforms for delivery, hence reducing manual labor.

=== Inspection room ===
In the inspection room, employees and officers passed through when reporting for or leaving work. It had stationed guards on duty.

=== Taiwan Design Museum ===
The Taiwan Design Museum building used to house the office for supervisors and officers of the tobacco plant. The office had also conference rooms and rest areas for guests. Ordinary plant employees were not allowed to access the building.

=== Tobacco Factory ===
The tobacco factory consists of three segments, which are North, South and East. The building has characteristics of long open hallways with no dividing walls. The first floor mainly comprises columns to support the weight of the machines on the second floor.

=== Baroque Garden ===
Enclosed by the tobacco factory three sections, the garden has a fountain that is surrounded by sculptures of naked women emerging from their baths.

=== Machine Repair Plant ===
The machine repair plant building now houses the TMSK restaurant. The machine repair plant was exclusively responsible for the reparation and maintenance of the tobacco producing machines.

=== Boiler Room ===
The boiler room acted as the power source for the tobacco plant. Coal was burnt here to provide power for the plant. The chimneys were used to expel the smoke generated.

=== Nursery Room ===
There used to be 1,200 employees working at the plant at the same time. The tobacco plant had an industrial village concept, in which it included facilities such as cafeterias, shower facilities, dormitories, hospital, food mall, dining rooms, entertainment rooms and nursery. The nursery room served as a place for the infants of the employees to rest and play.

=== Ecology Pond ===
For fire extinguishing, ventilation and hydrosphere purposes, a large lotus pond was installed. It is now revamped as an ecology pond where children can enjoy the sounds of frogs and insects and experience the beauty of ecology.

=== Taiwan Design Research Institute ===
The Taiwan Design Research Institute is a national design center established to promote the development of the cultural and creative industry in which it acts as the integrated platform to promote creative design. It was established in 2003 and become officially operational in 2004.

The main mission of TDC is to upgrade original creativity of Taiwanese designers, promote international design exchange, upgrade market competitiveness of Taiwanese industries, help enterprises build up their own brand, raise value-added of such industries and tell the world that the era of Designed in Taiwan has come.

=== Eslite Spectrum Songyan ===
The Songyan branch of Eslite Bookstore started 24-hour operations in January 2024.

== Transportation ==
The park is accessible within walking distance northeast from Sun Yat-sen Memorial Hall metro station or North West from Taipei City Hall metro station of the Taipei Metro.

== See also ==
- List of parks in Taiwan
- List of tourist attractions in Taiwan
- Taiwan Design Museum
