= Design Museum of Thessaloniki =

Coordinates: 40.6322°N 22.9419°E

- Μουσείο Design Θεσσαλονίκης
- Established: 1993
- Location: Thessaloniki, Central Macedonia, Greece
- Type: Design museum
- Collection size: 2,000 objects
- Founder: Stergios Delialis

Design Museum of Thessaloniki was a design museum in Thessaloniki, Central Macedonia, Greece. It collects items of industrial and graphic design.

The Museum of Design was founded in 1993. It came about as a result of Stergios Delialis’ love of industrial design and useful objects which stand out because of their unique design. Until 1997 it was housed in ground floor premises on Mitropoleos Street. Then, it was meant to be moved to new premises in the Port of Thessaloniki, but the space was never granted to the museum, causing it to stop operating as a permanent museum space. Today it is still searching for a permanent home. It remains active by showcasing its collection in temporary exhibitions, film shows and lectures.

The Museum of Design was the first place in Greece with a systematic approach to design. The core of the museum was its permanent collection of 2,000 objects representing industrial design in the 20th century. Classified according to subject matter (furnishing, lighting, domestic appliances, office equipment, graphics, packaging) the collection attempts to illustrate developments in perception, use, form, aesthetics and technology in the products of industrial design. There is also a library of 5000 books, plus magazines and catalogues on the subject of design.
