= Pieter Post =

Dutch painter (1608–1669)

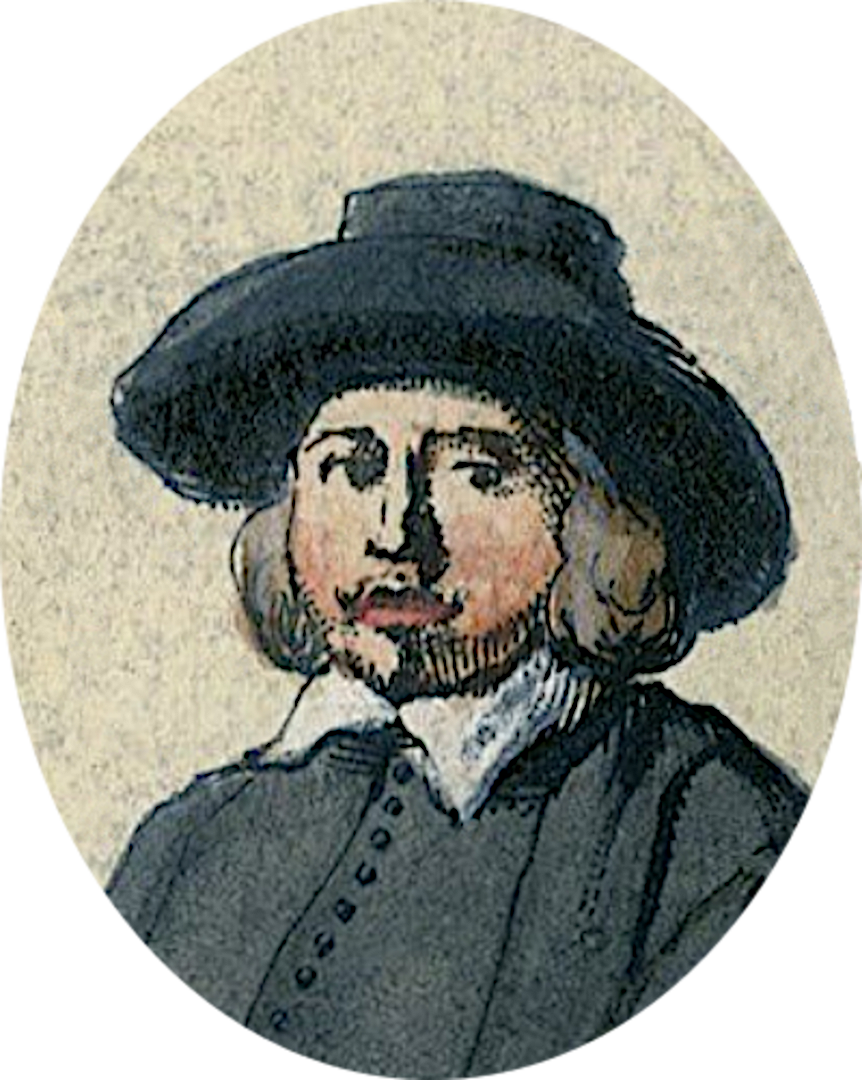
Pieter Post in 1651. Portrait by Pieter Nolpe, detail of a larger work

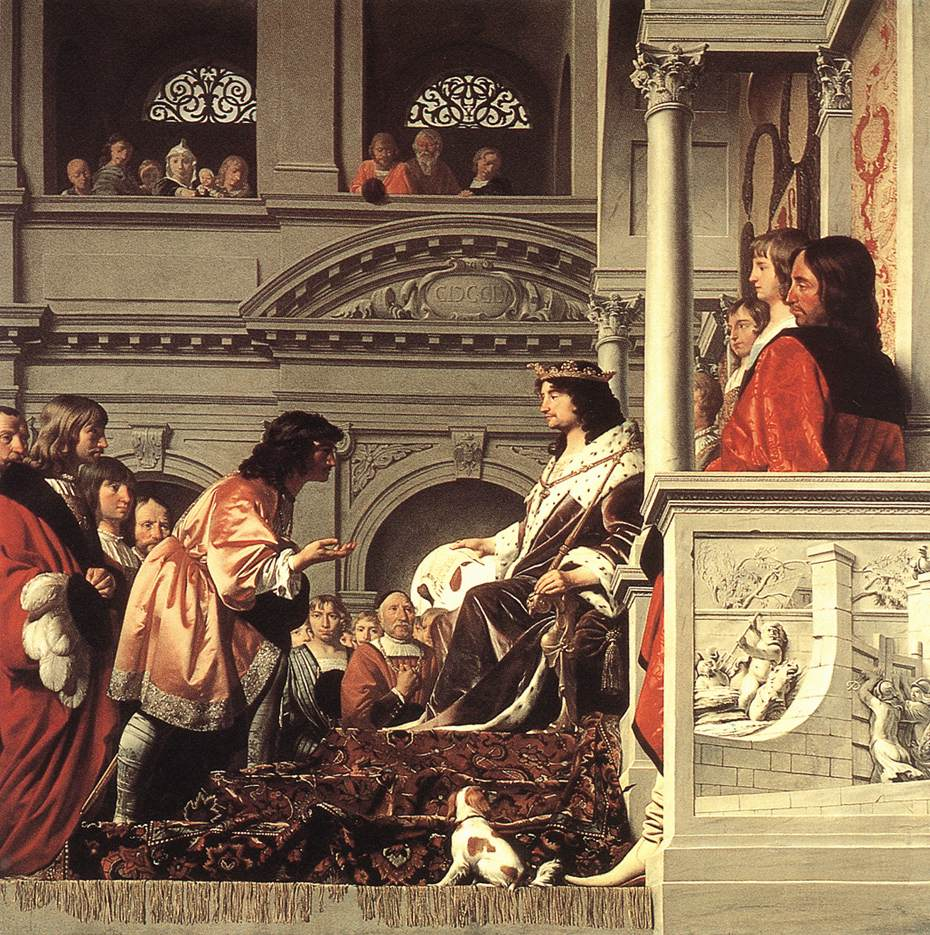
Count William II of Holland Granting Privileges to the Dike Wardens of Spaarndam in 1255 by Caesar van Everdingen (figures) and Pieter Post (architectural elements), 1654 (Gemeenlandshuis van Rijnland, Leiden)

Pieter Jansz Post (1 May 1608 – buried 8 May 1669) was a Dutch Golden Age architect, painter and printmaker.

== Biography ==
Post was baptised in Haarlem, the son of a stained-glass painter and the older brother of painter Frans Post. He is credited with the creation of the Dutch baroque style of architecture, along with his longtime collaborator Jacob van Campen. Together they designed the Mauritshuis in the Hague. According to Houbraken he was a famous architect who introduced his brother Frans to Maurice of Nassau, Prince of Orange, while he was working on plans for the Mauritshuis.

According to the RKD he became a member of the Haarlem Guild of St. Luke in 1623, and became painter and architect for Stadhouder Frederik Hendrik. He was the overseer from 1640 for the new additions to Paleis Noordeinde in The Hague. From 1645 he was the architect for Frederik Hendrik for Huis ten Bosch, where he worked together with Jacob van Campen. He died in The Hague, aged 61. His son Maurits became an architect, and his son Johan Post became a painter, and his daughter married the anatomist and collector Frederik Ruysch. His granddaughter Rachel Ruysch became a famous flower painter.

== Architectural work ==
- 1642 Design Museum Dedel, The Hague
- 1643 Huis Prinsessegracht 4 (the Hague)
- 1645-1650 Huis ten Bosch (the Hague)
- 1645-1648 Gemeenlandshuis Zwanenburg, Halfweg
- 1649-1653 Huis De Onbeschaamde, Dordrecht
- 1652-1657 Gebouw van de Staten van Holland, (the Hague)
- 1655 Johan de Witt Huis, (the Hague)
- 1657-1658 De Waag, Leiden
- 1659-1685 Maastricht City Hall, Maastricht
- 1659-1662 Kruithuis, Delft
- 1660 Hofje van Nieuwkoop (Den Haag),
- 1661-1662 Torendeel van Lambertuskerk in Buren
- 1662-1665 Heeze Castle, Heeze
- 1662-1680 Hervormde Kerk, Bennebroek
- 1663 Kerk van Stompetoren
- 1667 Oostkerk, Middelburg, Middelburg, Zeeland
- 1668- Kaaswaag, Gouda

== Gallery ==
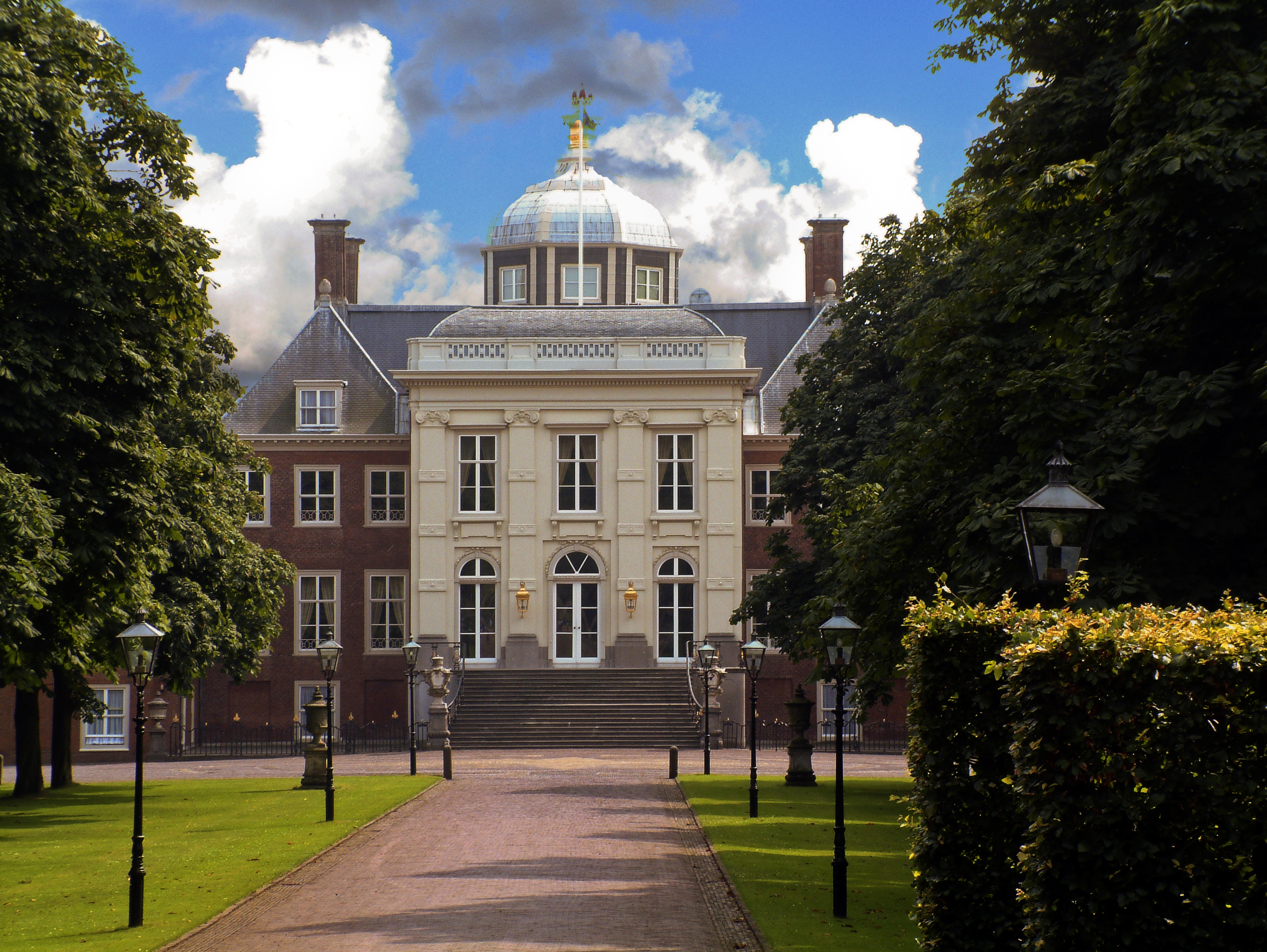
Huis ten Bosch (the Hague), built 1645-1650

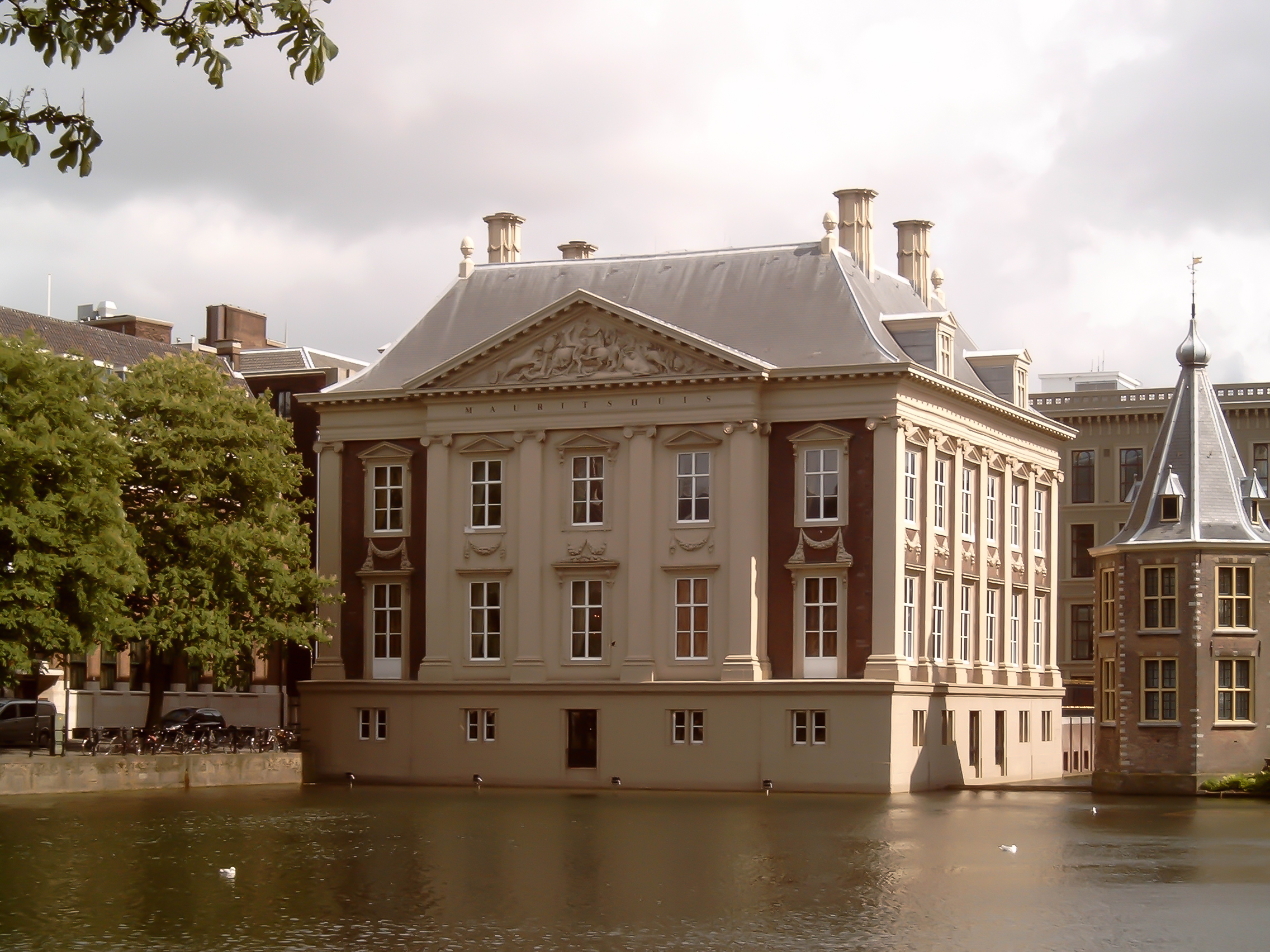
Mauritshuis (The Hague)

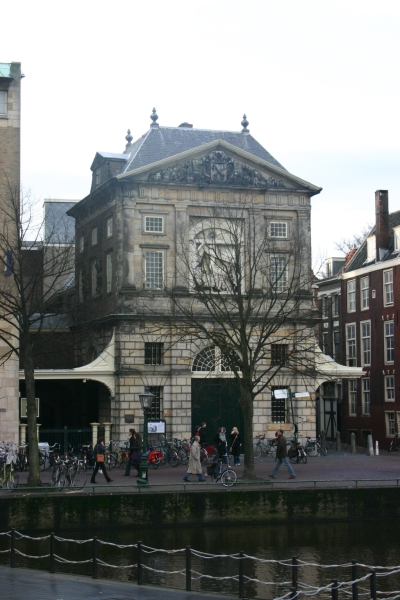
De Waag Leiden

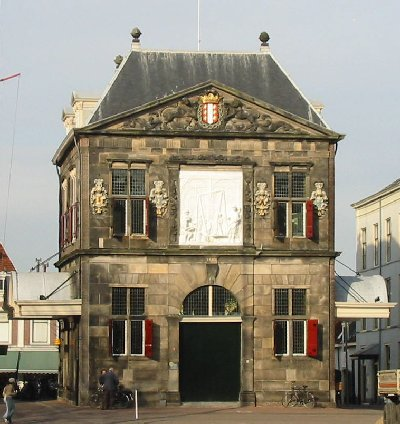
Kaaswaag Gouda

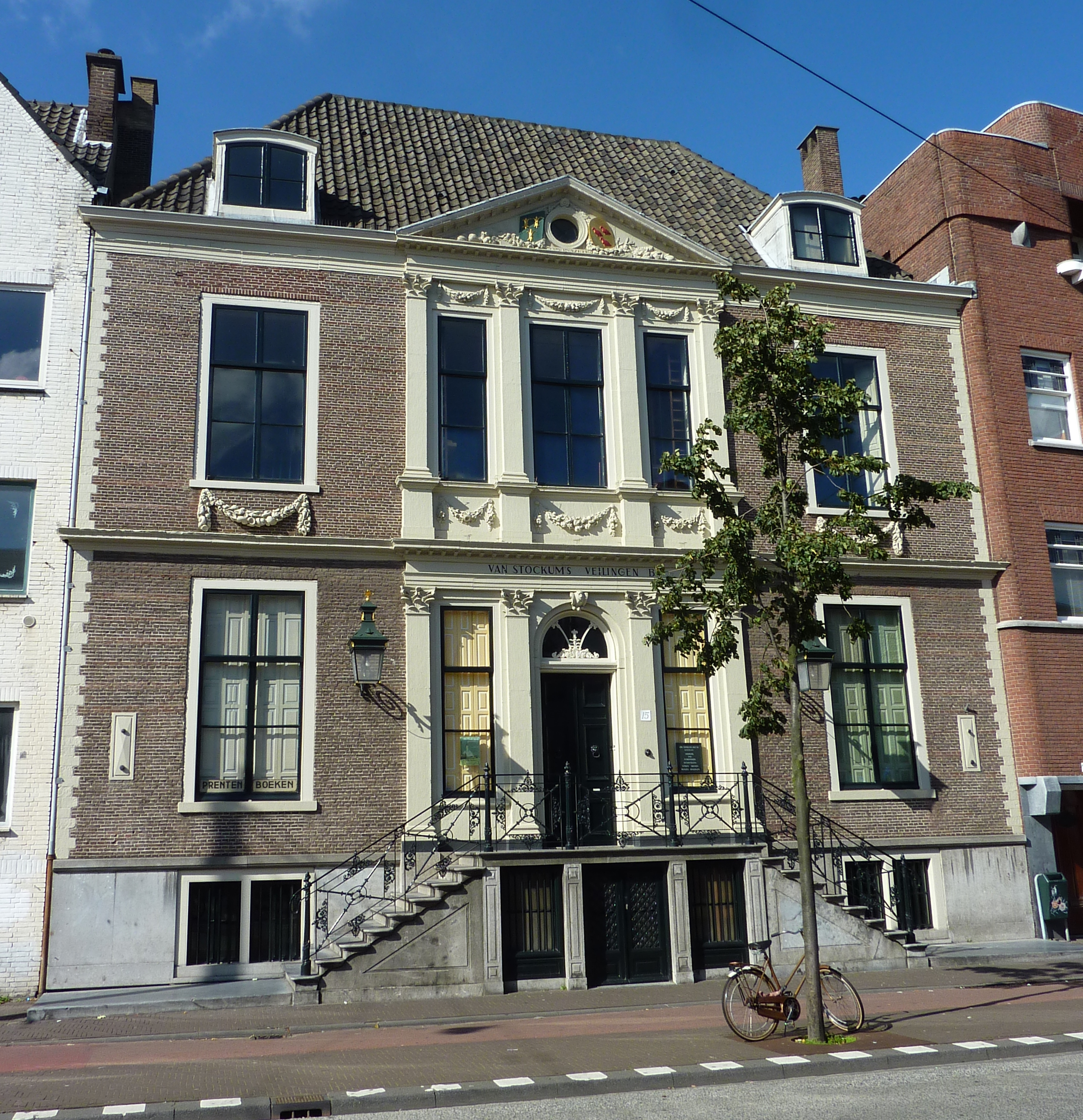
Dedel House (Huis Dedel) at Prinsegracht 15 in The Hague

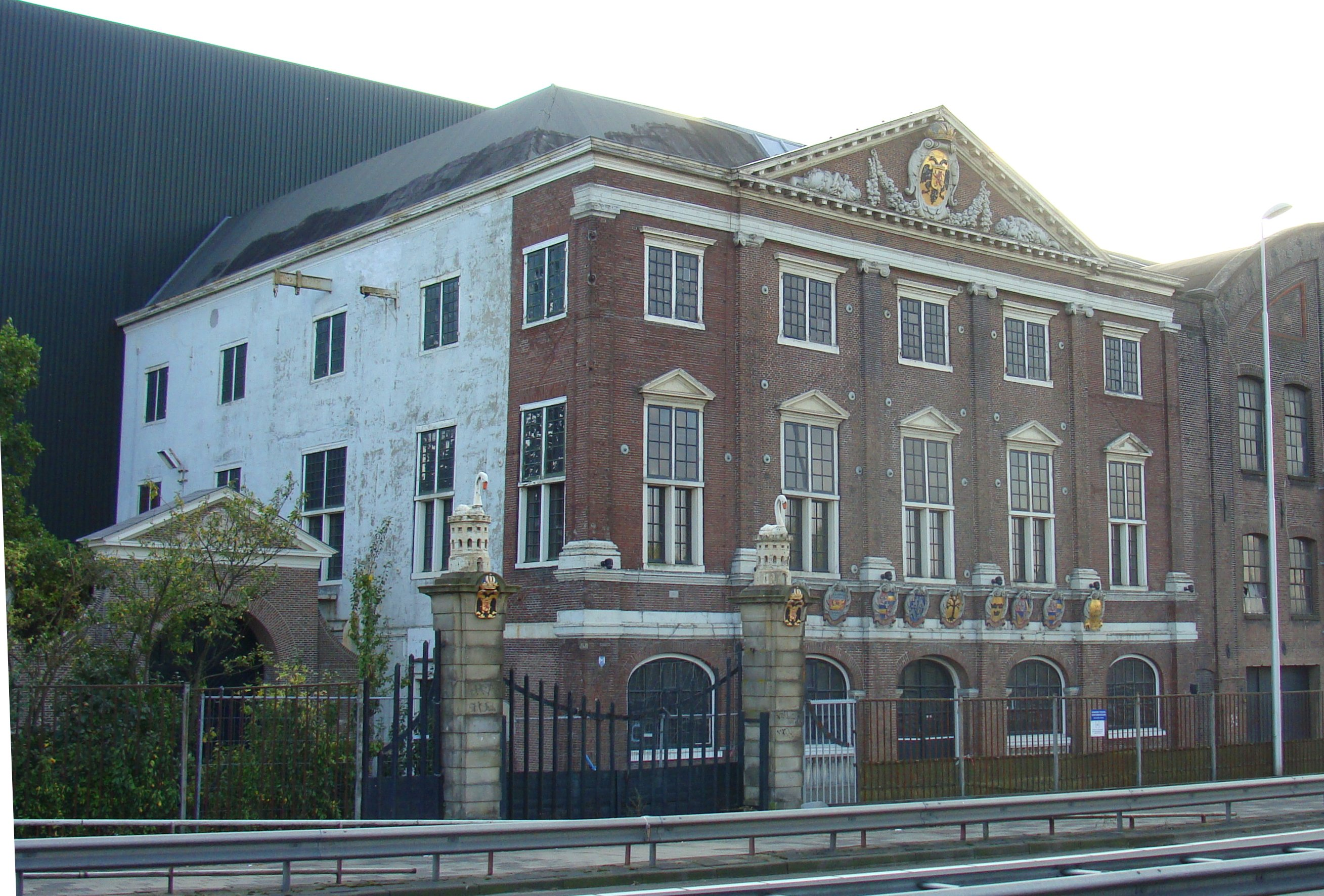
Gemeenlandshuis Zwanenburg, former seat of the Hoogheemraadschap van Rijnland waterboard, in Halfweg

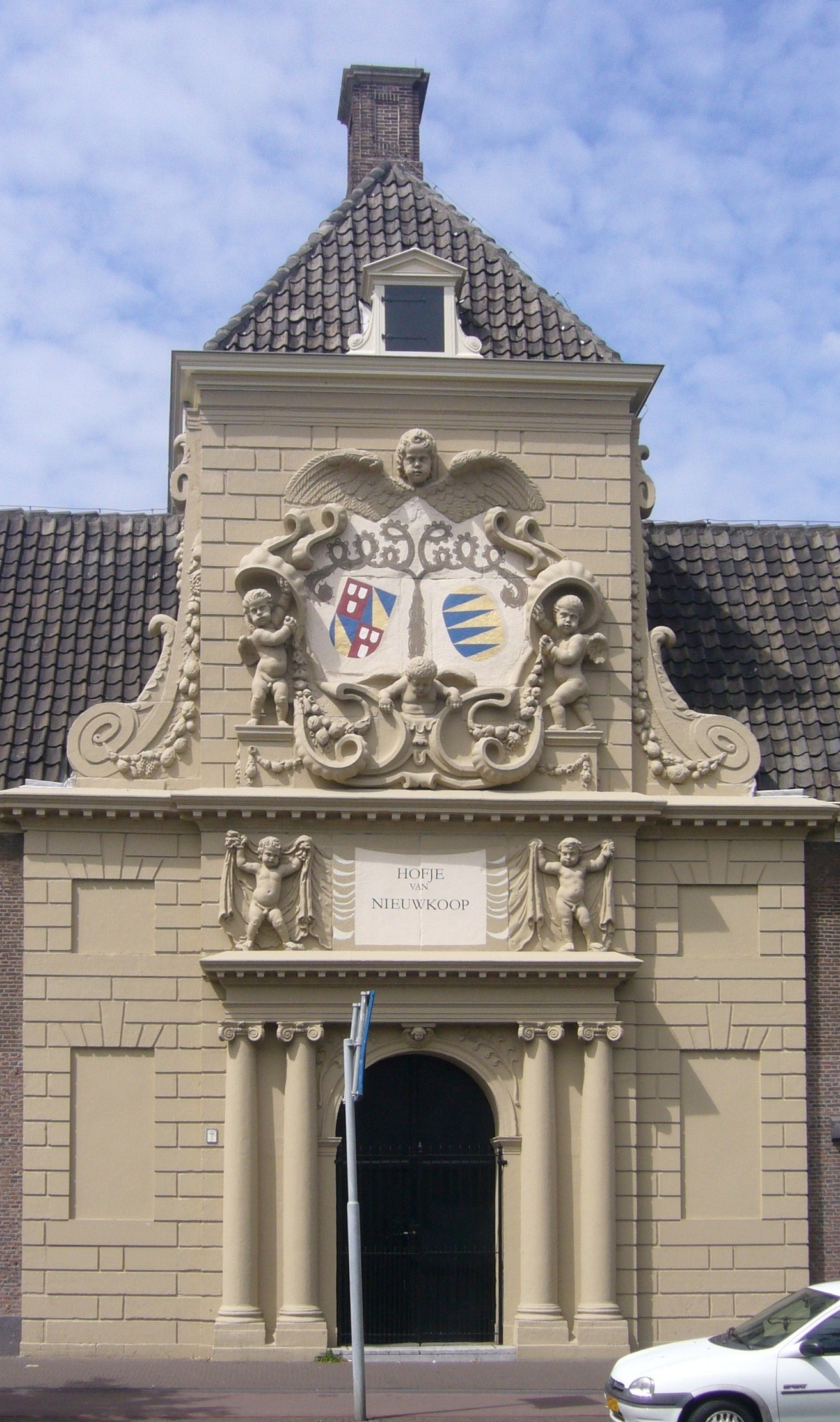
Hofje van Nieuwkoop (Den Haag)

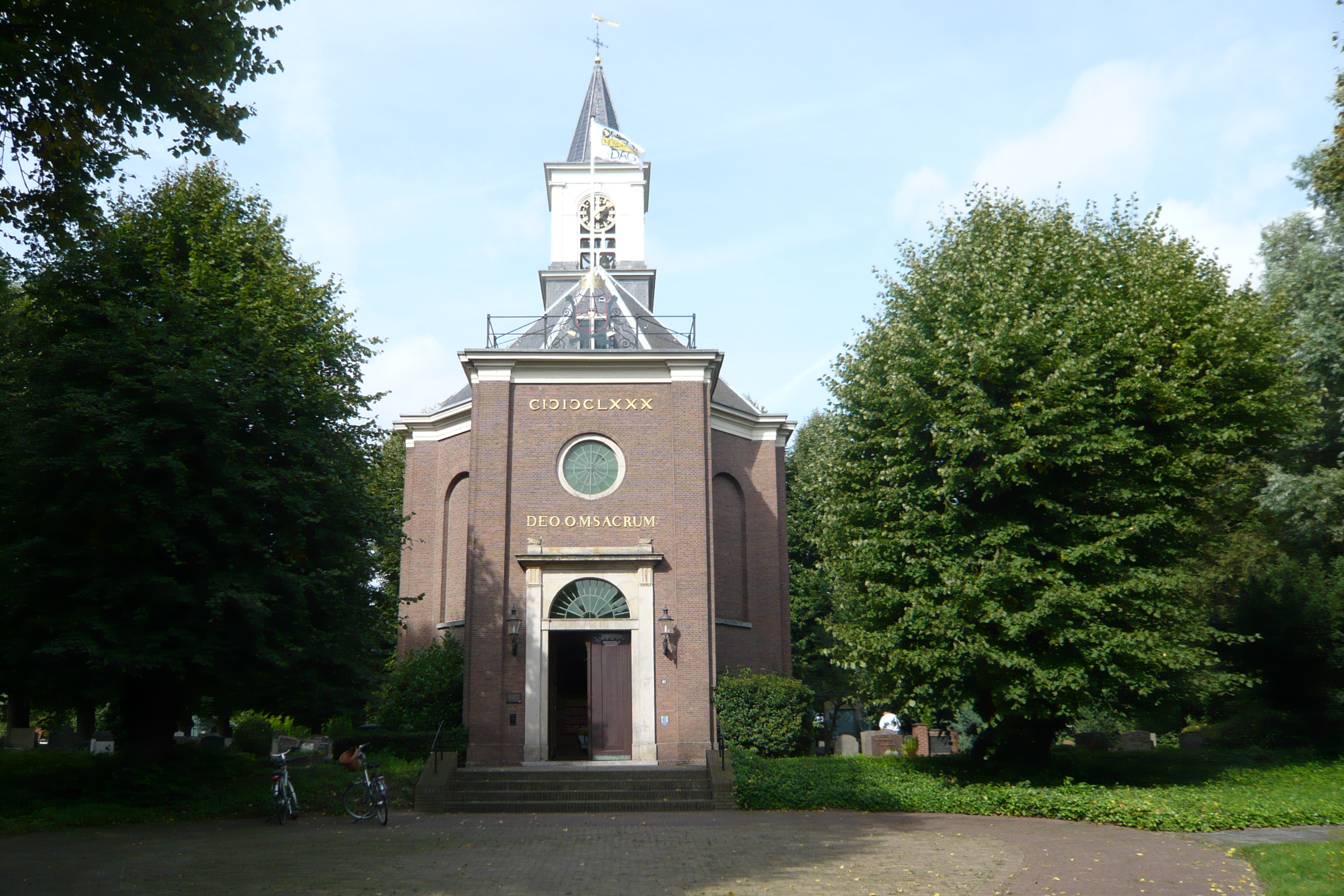
Dutch Reformed church of Bennebroek, which was finished posthumously in 1680.

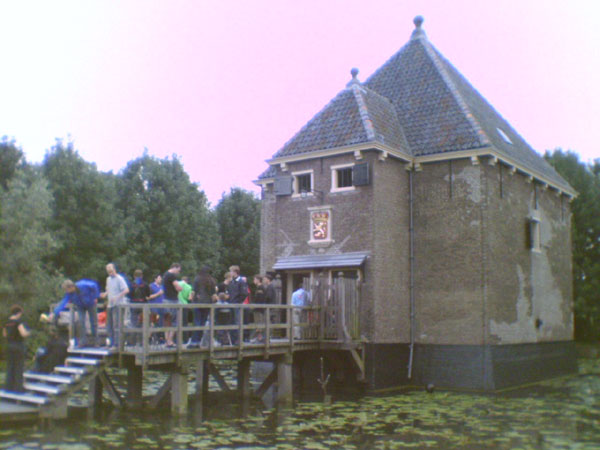
One of the "towers" of the "Kruithuis" in Delft

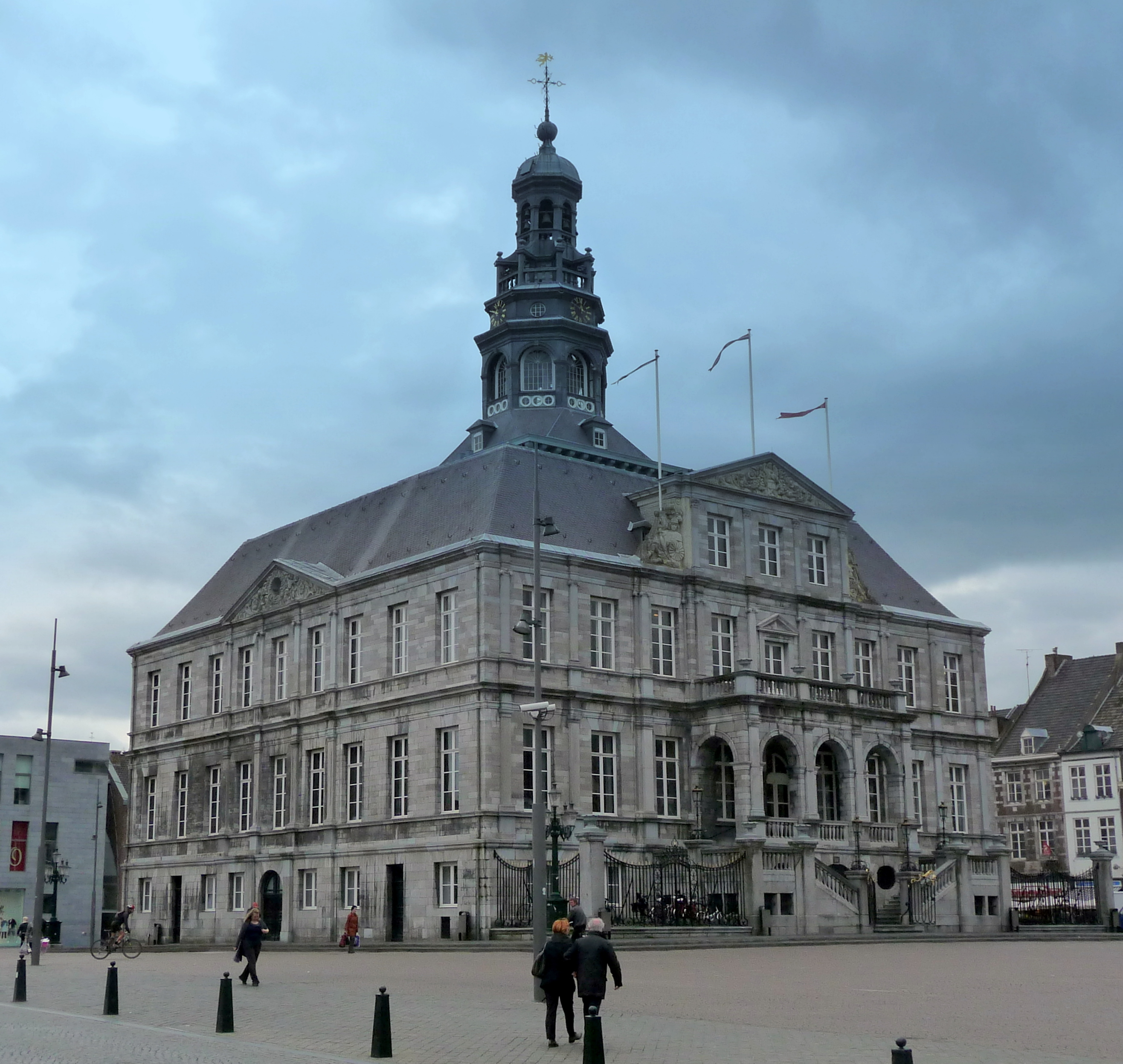
Maastricht city hall, considered Post's most accomplished work. After a drawing by Pieter Post
