= Taiwan Design Museum =

Museum in Xinyi, Taipei, Taiwan

- 台灣設計館
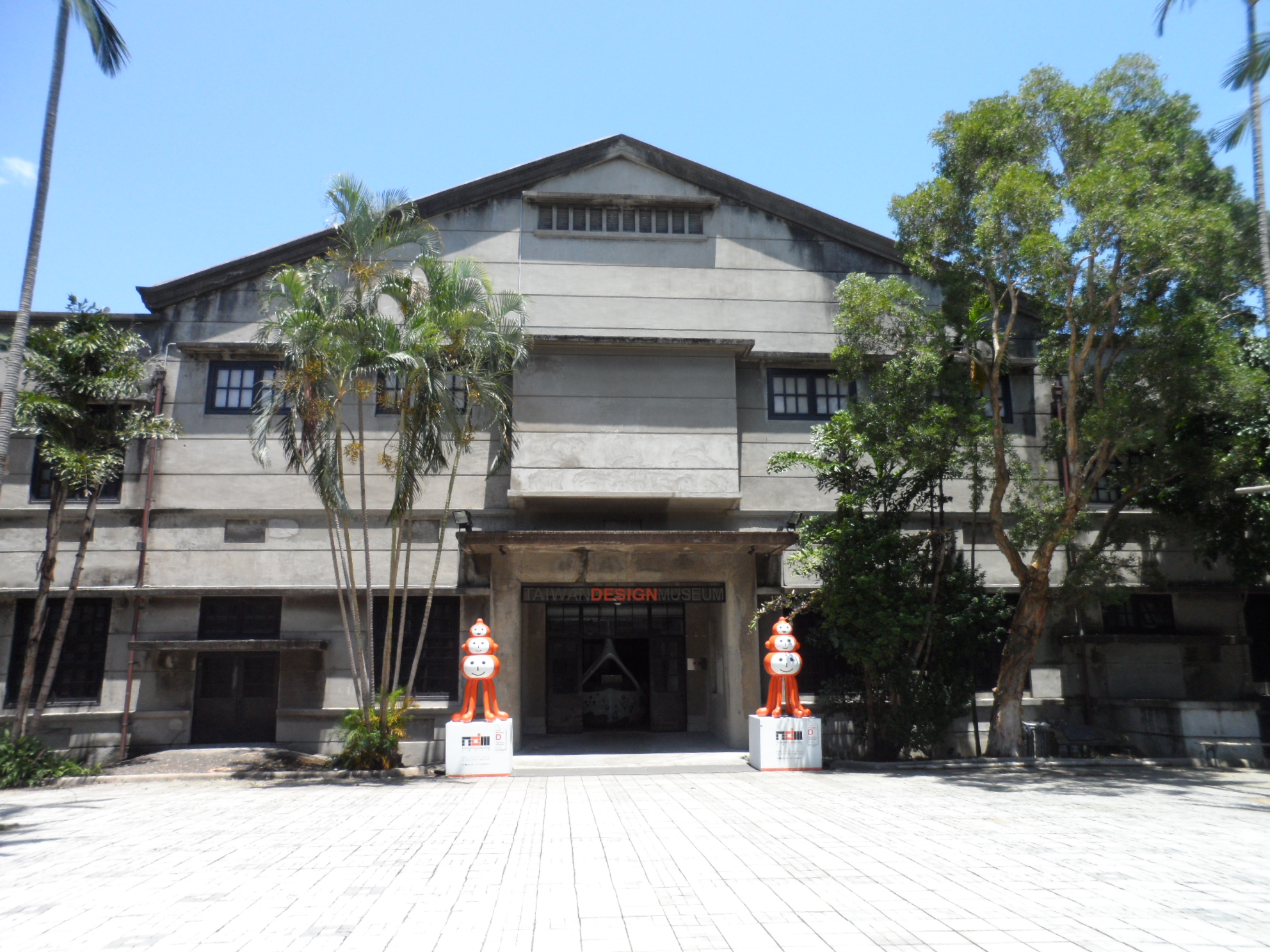
- Location: Xinyi, Taipei, Taiwan
- Coordinates: 25°02′39″N 121°33′38″E
- Type: museum
- Website: Official website (in Chinese)

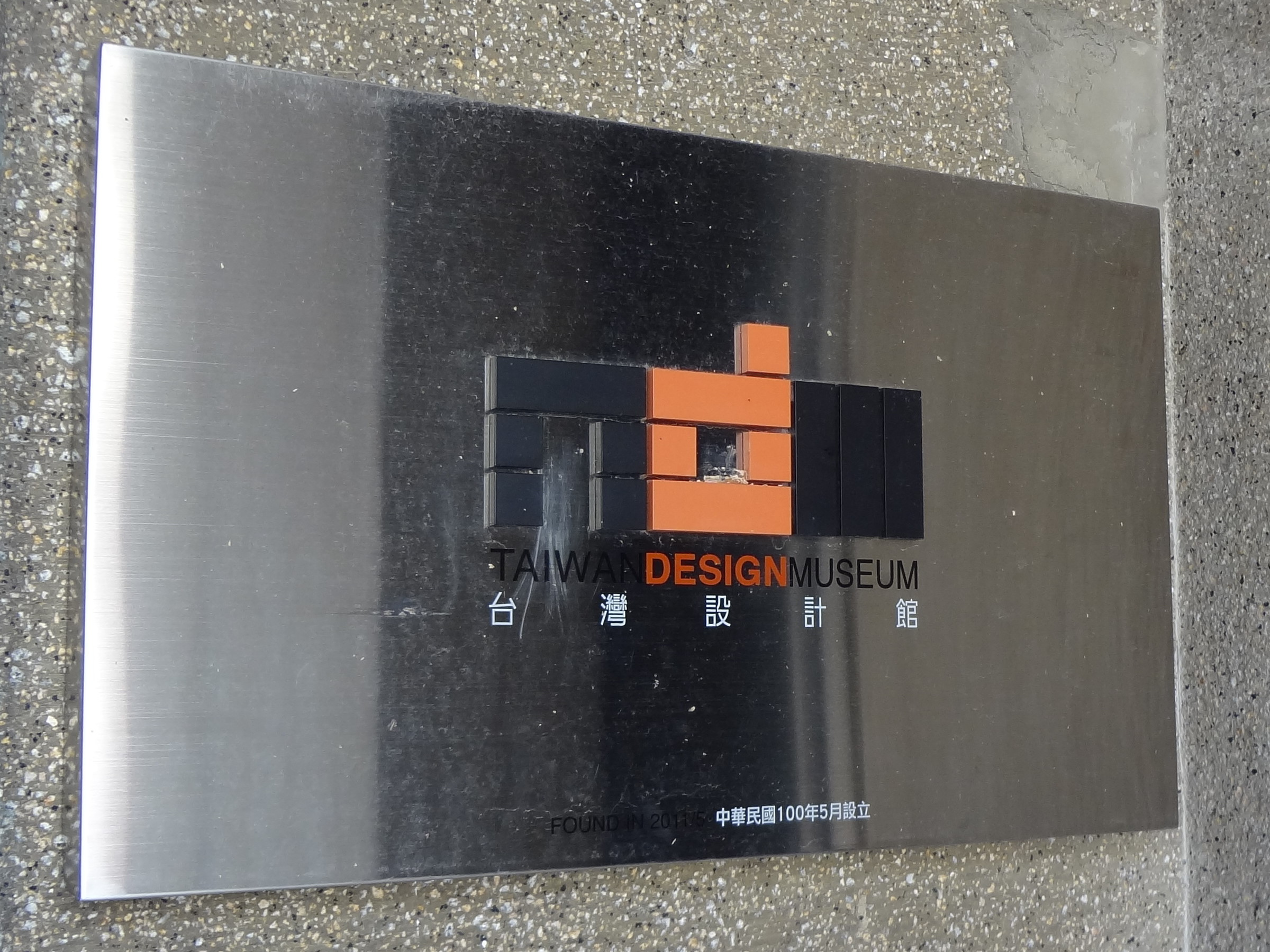
Taiwan Design Museum plate

The Taiwan Design Museum (traditional Chinese: 台灣設計館; simplified Chinese: 台湾设计馆; pinyin: Táiwān Shèjì Guǎn) is a museum about design in Xinyi District, Taipei, Taiwan. The museum is located at Songshan Cultural and Creative Park.

== Exhibitions ==
The museum exhibits various artifacts about design and its development in Taiwan. It also exhibits various temporary exhibitions from inside and outside Taiwan.

== Transportation ==
The museum is accessible within walking distance northeast from Sun Yat-sen Memorial Hall Station of the Taipei Metro.

== See also ==
- List of design museums
- List of museums in Taiwan
- Songshan Cultural and Creative Park
