= ReclameArsenaal =

ReclameArsenaal is a charitable foundation with the goal to manage the heritage of Dutch advertising. The collection of ReclameArsenaal has been in existence since 1975, brought together by various members of the advertising community and individual collections. It includes around 30,000 advertisements from 1850 onwards, mainly posters and printwork.

The ReclameArsenaal is an important creditor to the Design Museum Dedel in The Hague, Netherlands.

== International Advertising & Design Database ==
Items in the ReclameArsenaal can be found via the International Advertising & Design Database (IADDB). Many of the items on the database are drawn from the ReclameArsenaal collection. In total, it includes descriptions and images of around 100,000 items, mainly posters and printed material. There are also advertisements, radio and TV commercials, packaging.

The database also includes other collections which are now under the long-term curation of the ReclameArsenaal. This includes the historical collection of JC Decaux (previously known as Publex BV), the poster collection of the Royal Academy of Art (Koninklijke Academie van Beeldende Kunsten) in The Hague; and the poster collection of the council of Roermond.
