= Taiwan Design Research Institute =

Organization based in Xinyi, Taipei, Taiwan

- 台灣設計研究院
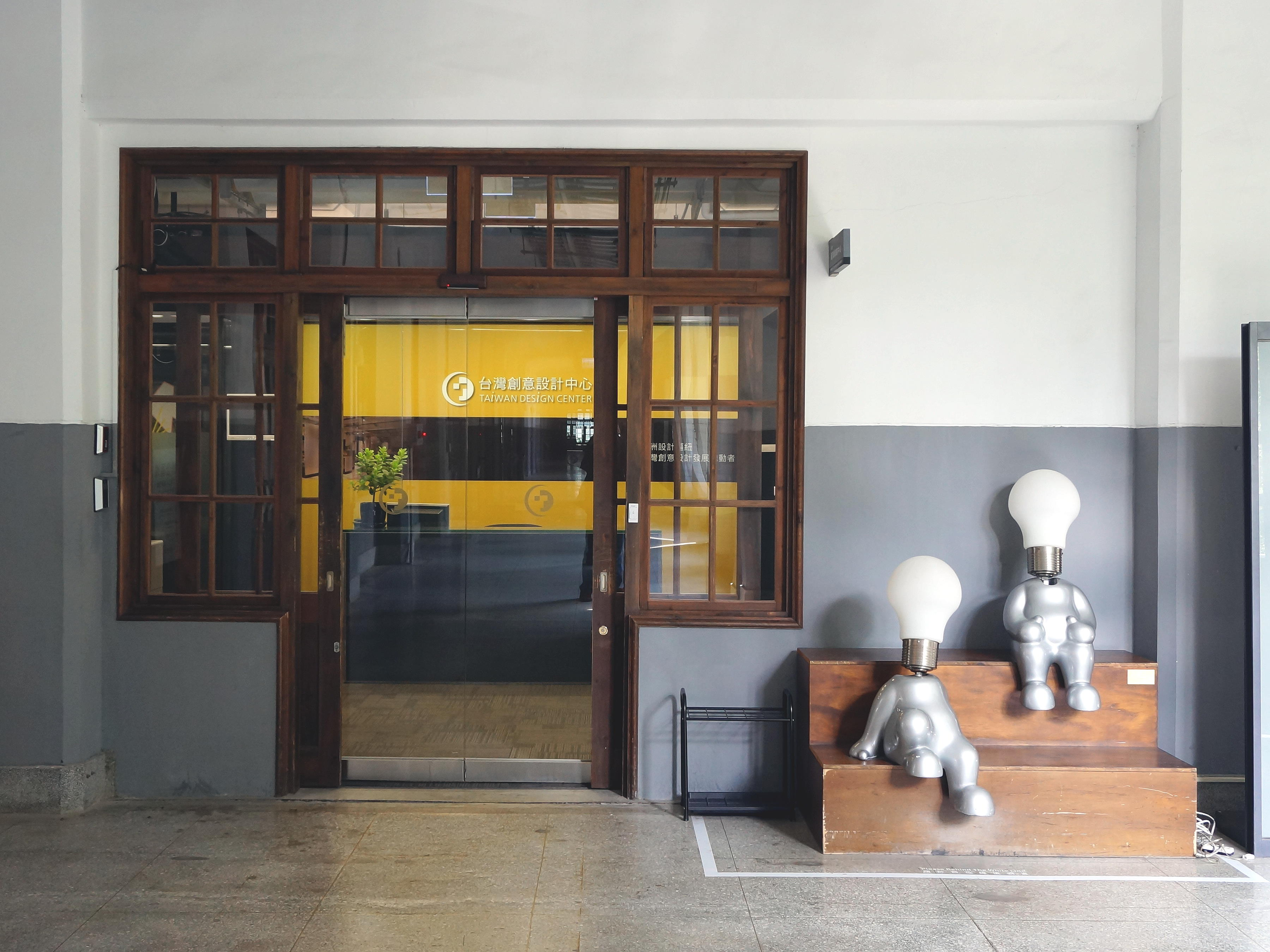
- Abbreviation: TDRI
- Predecessor: Taiwan Design Center
- Formation: 2003
- Type: Governmental
- Registration no.: 99330539
- Headquarters: Xinyi, Taipei, Taiwan
- Locations: Taipei, Taiwan; Kaohsiung, Taiwan
- Coordinates: 25°02′38.4″N 121°33′36.3″E
- Parent organization: Ministry of Economic Affairs (Taiwan)
- Budget: NT$424 million (2019)
- Website: Official website
- Formerly called: Taiwan Design Center

The Taiwan Design Research Institute (TDRI; Chinese: 台灣設計研究院; pinyin: Táiwān Shèjì Yánjiù Yuàn) is a governmental arts organization based in Songshan Cultural and Creative Park, Taipei, Taiwan.

TDRI manages and annually organizes:

- Taiwan Design Expo, an event collaborating with a local municipality to showcase design talent and local industries, with over 21 million total visitors over the first 20 years.
- Golden Pin Design Award, a prize established in 1981 with the Industrial Development Bureau. In 2020, it received over 5,000 entries.
- Young Designers' Exhibition (YODEX), an event to showcase student designs, often undergraduate capstones.

TDRI has worked with a wide range of governmental organizations; including, the Ministry of Culture on international pavilions, National Fire Agency on emergency signage standardization, and even the Central Election Commission on election information communication.

In 2019, TDRI had a budget of NT$424 million and received 41% of its funding from the Ministry of Economic Affairs, 40% from other governmental agencies like the Ministry of Education and Ministry of Transportation and Communications, and 19% from the private sector.

== History ==
- 1979: Taiwan's China External Trade Development Council (CETRA) established the Taiwan Industrial Design Promotion Center (IDPC; Chinese: 台灣工業設計推廣中心).
- 2003: The Ministry of Economic Affairs (MOEA) Industrial Development Bureau expanded CETRA's IDPC into the Taiwan Design Center (TDC; Chinese: 台灣設計中心), and organized the first annual Taiwan Design Expo.
- 2004: The TDC officially started operations, and took over execution of the GD-Mark/National Design Award.
- 2009: The GD-Mark/National Design Award was renamed Golden Pin Design Award for wider global recognition, echoing the brand of other prestigious Taiwan awards like the Golden Horse and Golden Bell.
- 2011: TDC and Taipei City Government cooperated to host multiple international design events, prompting President Ma Ying-jeou to call 2011 Taiwan's "Year of Design". TDC also moved from Nangang into the newly transformed Songshan Cultural and Creative Park.
- 2014: TDC and the American Institute in Taiwan jointly established the American Innovation Center.
- 2018: Golden Pin Design Award removed the requirement for entries to include a partner from Chinese-speaking regions.
- 2020: In February, Taiwan Design Center was renamed Taiwan Design Research Institute (TDRI) and received a budget increase to NT$530 million. It also received the Presidential Innovation Award.

== See also ==
- Culture of Taiwan
- Taiwan Design Expo website
- Golden Pin Design Award website
- YODEX website
