= Icelandic Museum of Design and Applied Art =

Art museum in Garðabær, Iceland

- Hönnunarsafn Íslands
- Established: 2010
- Location: Garðatorg 1, 210 Garðabær, Iceland
- Coordinates: 64.0891°N 21.9206°W
- Type: art museum
- Website: honnunarsafn.is

The Icelandic Museum of Design and Applied Art (Icelandic: Hönnunarsafn Íslands) is a museum of product and furniture design in the town Garðabær, near Reykjavík in Iceland. The collection was started in 1998, but the museum did not open until 2010. It has a permanent exhibition consisting mainly of Scandinavian design objects of the last hundred years. It also holds events and temporary exhibitions.

Most of the collection was acquired through donations.
