= Design Museum Dedel =

Museum in The Hague, the Netherlands

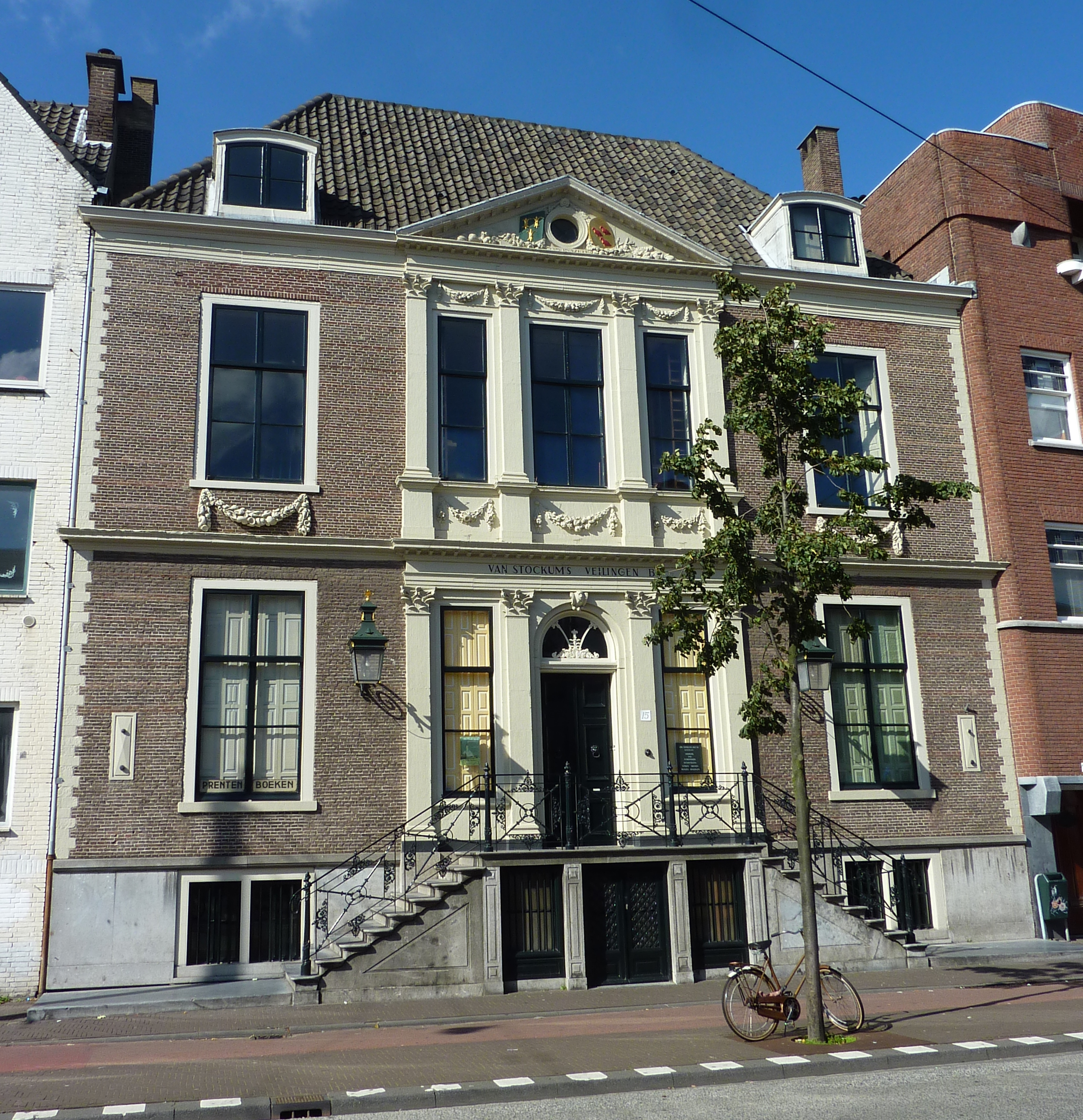
- Museum at the Prinsegracht 15

- Location in South Holland in the Netherlands
- Established: 2017
- Location: Den Haag, Zuid-Holland
- Coordinates: 52°4′30.59″N 4°18′27.61″E
- Type: Art museum
- Architect: Pieter Post
- Public transit access: HTM Tram 2,3,4 and 6. Stop Grote Markt
- Website: www.designmuseumdedel.nl

Design Museum Dedel is a museum located in The Hague.

The museum hosts thematic exhibitions of two-dimensional design, including graphic design, posters, wallpaper – and has included posters from the collection of the former Poster Museum in Hoorn and objects (including posters) from the collection of the ReclameArsenaal.

The museum was opened on July 1, 2019 by Mrs. Hedy d'Ancona with an exhibition dedicated to the work of two designers, Milton Glaser and Wim Crouwel, both of whom were 90 years old at the time. In the fall of 2019, the exhibition 'KLM, the First Century' with accompanying publication about KLM followed

Following the COVID-19 pandemic, the museum reopened in 2022. The museum is privately funded and works with a staff of volunteers.

== Dedel House ==
Dedel House was built in 1642, likely by the architect Pieter Post, and was commissioned by Willem Willemszn Dedel. In the 17th and 18th centuries it belonged to the family Dedel. In 2018, with the support of the Province of South Holland, an extensive restoration of the building was started. The restoration of the outside of the building was completed in 2020. The house is a Dutch grade A listed building.

The interior includes 19th-century wallpaper, including imitation Japanese gold leather wallpaper, the so-called kinkarakawakami. The rococo-style staircase dates from 1735 and has a cupola and stucco. The plaster was likely designed by the Italian Joseph Bollina, who employed an inventive play of light.

Interior decoration incorporates the story of Magdalena Dedel (born Muijssart), who died in 1733. On the day of her death (September 3), the sun shines exactly on her image at 4:10 p.m. On the longest day (June 21) at 4:10 p.m., the face of a man appears, probably the mayor Jan Hudde Dedel, Magdalena's grieving husband.

The interior consists of seven ceiling paintings by Jacob de Wit, at least five upper door pieces and fourteen grisailles by the same artist. There are also tapestries by the firm Leyniers from Brussels, panelling, gold leather wall covering, a mirror with decoration by Jacob de Wit representing an allegory of inheritance, fireplaces, crystal chandeliers, most with representations of Ovid's Metamorphoses. These interior decorations were sold shortly after 1871 by the then owner, the noble family Melort, to the Viennese branch of the Rothschild family, for ƒl 25,200.00 (with The Hague antiques dealer Léon Sarluis probably acting as an intermediary).

After the Anschluss in 1938 by the Nazi's, the interior was destined for the Führermuseum in Linz (not realized) and stored in salt mines in Altaussee (Austria). After the war, most of it was restituted to the family and then spread over the world. A reconstruction of the interior is being worked on in collaboration with the Rothschild family. The Dedel House Foundation, owner of the building, already acquired some tapestries. A ceiling painting by Jacob de Wit, twice enlarged, from the Dedel House is located in Waddesdon Manor and chandeliers are hanging in the Neue Burg in Vienna.

== Museum Collection ==
Design Museum Dedel does not have a collection, but uses loans from the collection of the ReclameArsenaal foundation, and various public and private collections, including a collection of more than 40,000 wallpaper samples from the period of 1880–2000. The collection of the ReclameArsenaal consists of more than 70,000 posters from the period 1880–1980.

As the Dedel House retains the original wallpaper from the 19th century on many of these walls, the Design Museum has started collecting historical wallpaper. The collections are archived in a separate storage.

The wallpaper library can be accessed primarily at the International Institute of Social History in Amsterdam and partly in Dedel House. The collection can also be accessed through the sister institution, the International Advertising & Design Database (IADDB), which contains literature on art and design, including various art magazines, such as De Stijl, Wendingen, das Plakat, die Form, Merz, der Gebrauchsgraphik, Cercle et Carré, Bauhausbücher, Vendre and others.
